= List of the busiest airports in Romania =

This is a list of the busiest airports in Romania.

== 2025 ==
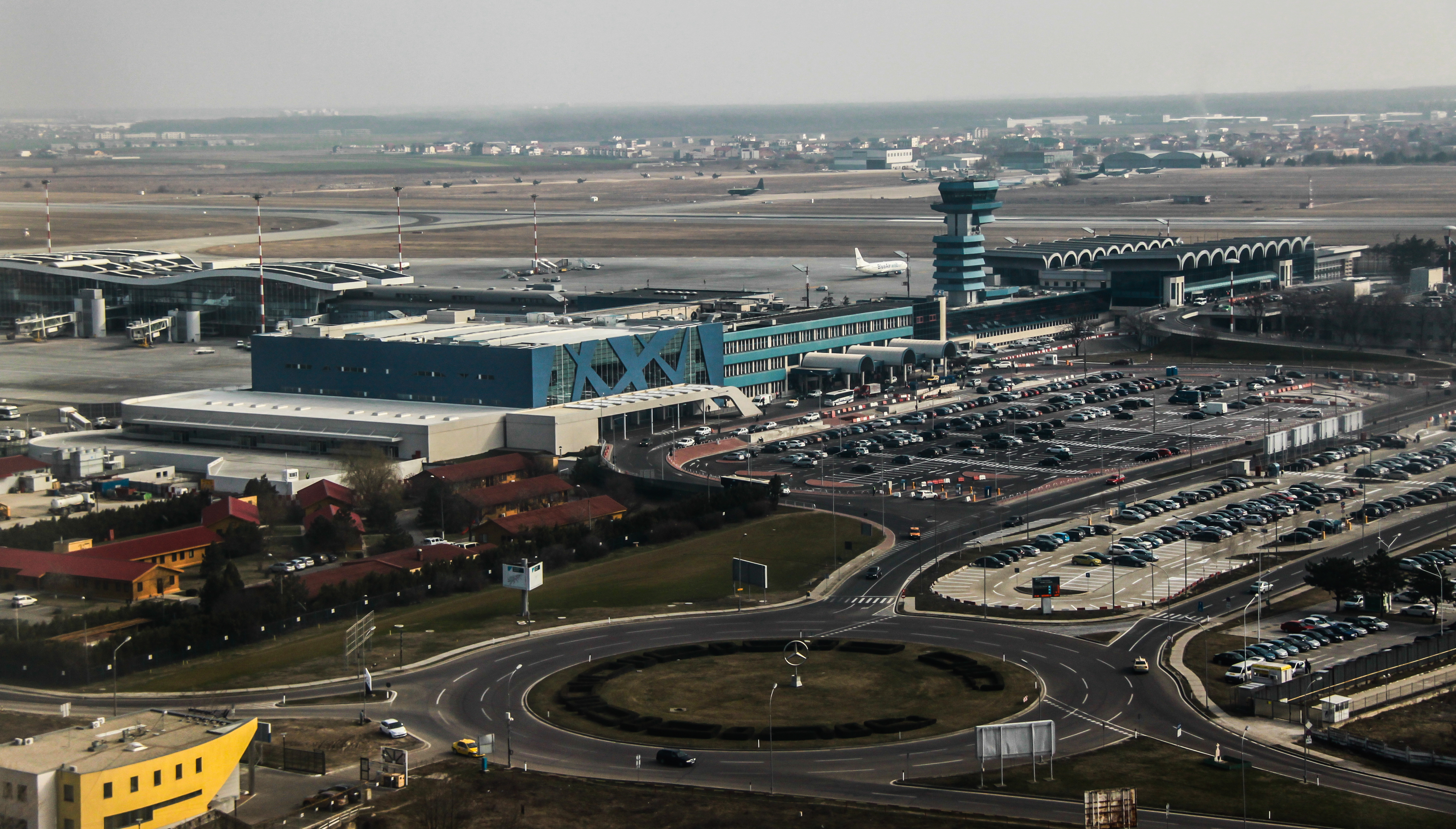
Henri Coandă International Airport is the busiest airport in Romania.

Rank	Airport	City	Code (IATA/ICAO)	Passengers	Annual change	Rank change
1.	Henri Coandă International Airport	Bucharest	OTP/LROP	17,001,578	▲6.7%	Steady
2.	Cluj Avram Iancu International Airport	Cluj-Napoca	CLJ/LRCL	3,582,134	▲9.7%	Steady
3.	Iași International Airport	Iași	IAS/LRIA	2,244,156	▲2.2%	Steady
4.	Traian Vuia International Airport	Timișoara	TSR/LRTR	1,458,098	▲10.2%	Steady
5.	Ștefan cel Mare International Airport	Suceava	SCV/LRSV	769,408	▲3.1%	Steady
6.	Sibiu International Airport	Sibiu	SBZ/LRSB	694,805	▲21.1%	Steady
7.	Aurel Vlaicu International Airport	Bucharest	BBU/LRBS	694,718	▲548.7%	▲6
8.	Craiova International Airport	Craiova	CRA/LRCV	578,401	▲36.2%	Steady
9.	George Enescu International Airport	Bacău	BCM/LRBC	451,036	▼19.2%	▼2
10.	Brașov Airport	Brașov	GHV/LRBV	337,353	▲48%	▼1
11.	Oradea Airport	Oradea	OMR/LROD	256,945	▲51.9%	Steady
12.	Transilvania Airport	Târgu Mureș	TGM/LRTM	153,264	▼28.2%	▼2
13.	Mihail Kogălniceanu International Airport	Constanța	CND/LRCK	119,426	▲9.2%	▼1
14.	Baia Mare Airport	Baia Mare	BAY/LRBM	94,226	▲8.4%	Steady
15.	Satu Mare International Airport	Satu Mare	SUJ/LRSM	94,110	▲34%	Steady
16.	Arad International Airport	Arad	ARW/LRAR	15,270	▼41.6%	Steady
17.	Danube Delta Tulcea Airport	Tulcea	TCE/LRTC	8,173	▲404.2%	Steady
Total				28,547,056	▲9.66%	

== 2024 ==
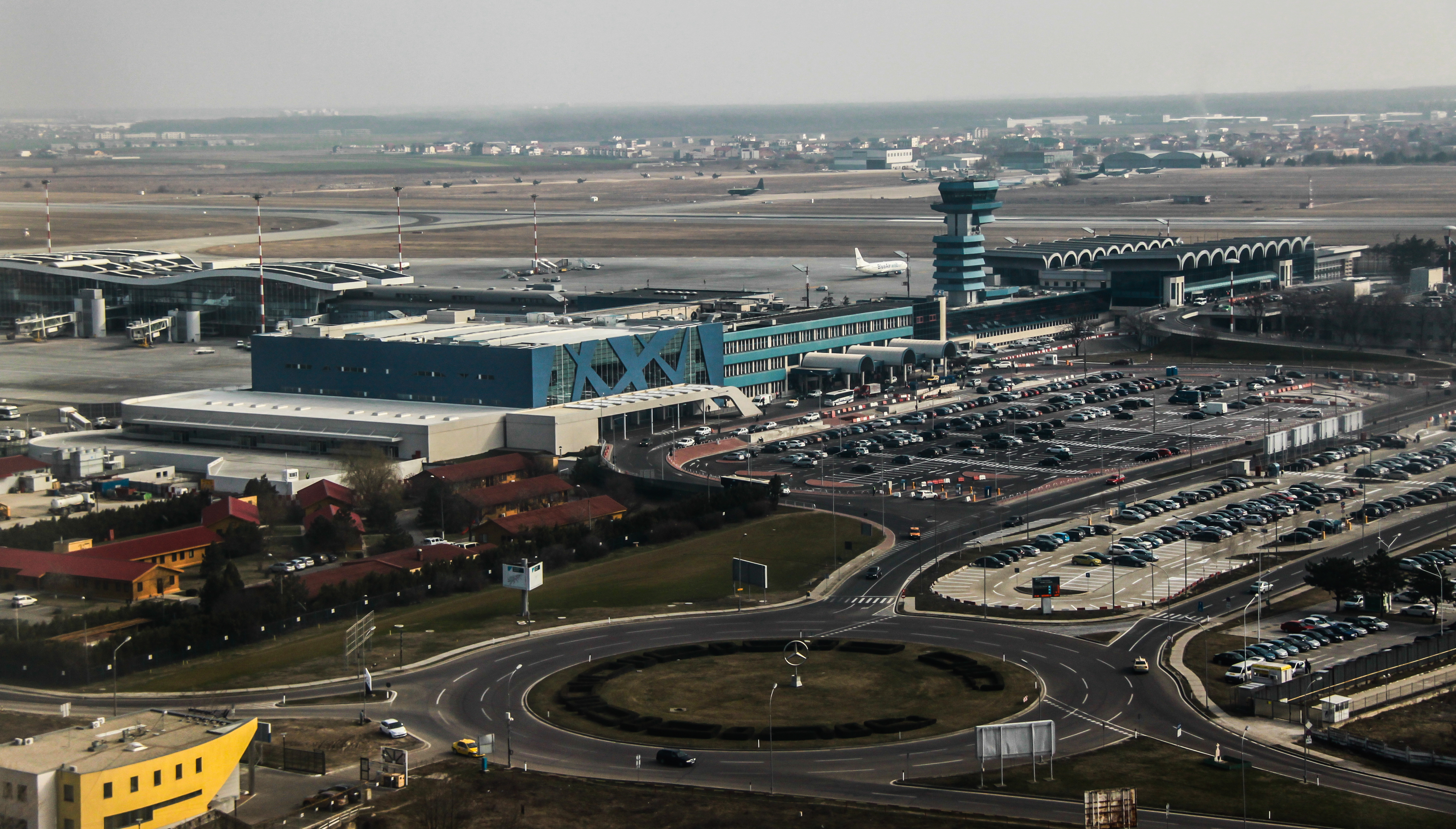
Henri Coandă International Airport is the busiest airport in Romania.

Rank	Airport	City	Code (IATA/ICAO)	Passengers	Annual change	Rank change
1.	Henri Coandă International Airport	Bucharest	OTP/LROP	15,940,443	▲9.0%	Steady
2.	Cluj Avram Iancu International Airport	Cluj-Napoca	CLJ/LRCL	3,266,447	▲0.8%	Steady
3.	Iași International Airport	Iași	IAS/LRIA	2,196,793	▼6.1%	Steady
4.	Traian Vuia International Airport	Timișoara	TSR/LRTR	1,323,690	▼2.3%	Steady
5.	Ștefan cel Mare International Airport	Suceava	SCV/LRSV	746,600	▼6.9%	Steady
6.	Sibiu International Airport	Sibiu	SBZ/LRSB	573,918	▲4.3%	▲1
7.	George Enescu International Airport	Bacău	BCM/LRBC	559,644	▲124.0%	▲2
8.	Craiova International Airport	Craiova	CRA/LRCV	424,976	▼28.9%	▼2
9.	Brașov Airport	Brașov	GHV/LRBV	227,900	▲188.4%	▲4
10.	Transilvania Airport	Târgu Mureș	TGM/LRTM	213,312	▼18.9%	▼2
11.	Oradea Airport	Oradea	OMR/LROD	169,166	▲10.9%	▼1
12.	Mihail Kogălniceanu International Airport	Constanța	CND/LRCK	109,371	▲3.7%	▼1
13.	Aurel Vlaicu International Airport	Bucharest	BBU/LRBS	107,087	▲57.2%	▲1
14.	Baia Mare Airport	Baia Mare	BAY/LRBM	86,928	▼3.3%	▼2
15.	Satu Mare International Airport	Satu Mare	SUJ/LRSM	70,206	▲24.5%	Steady
16.	Arad International Airport	Arad	ARW/LRAR	15,270	▲6.3%	Steady
17.	Danube Delta Tulcea Airport	Tulcea	TCE/LRTC	1,621	▲440.3%	Steady
Total				26,033,372	▲5.9%	

== 2023 ==
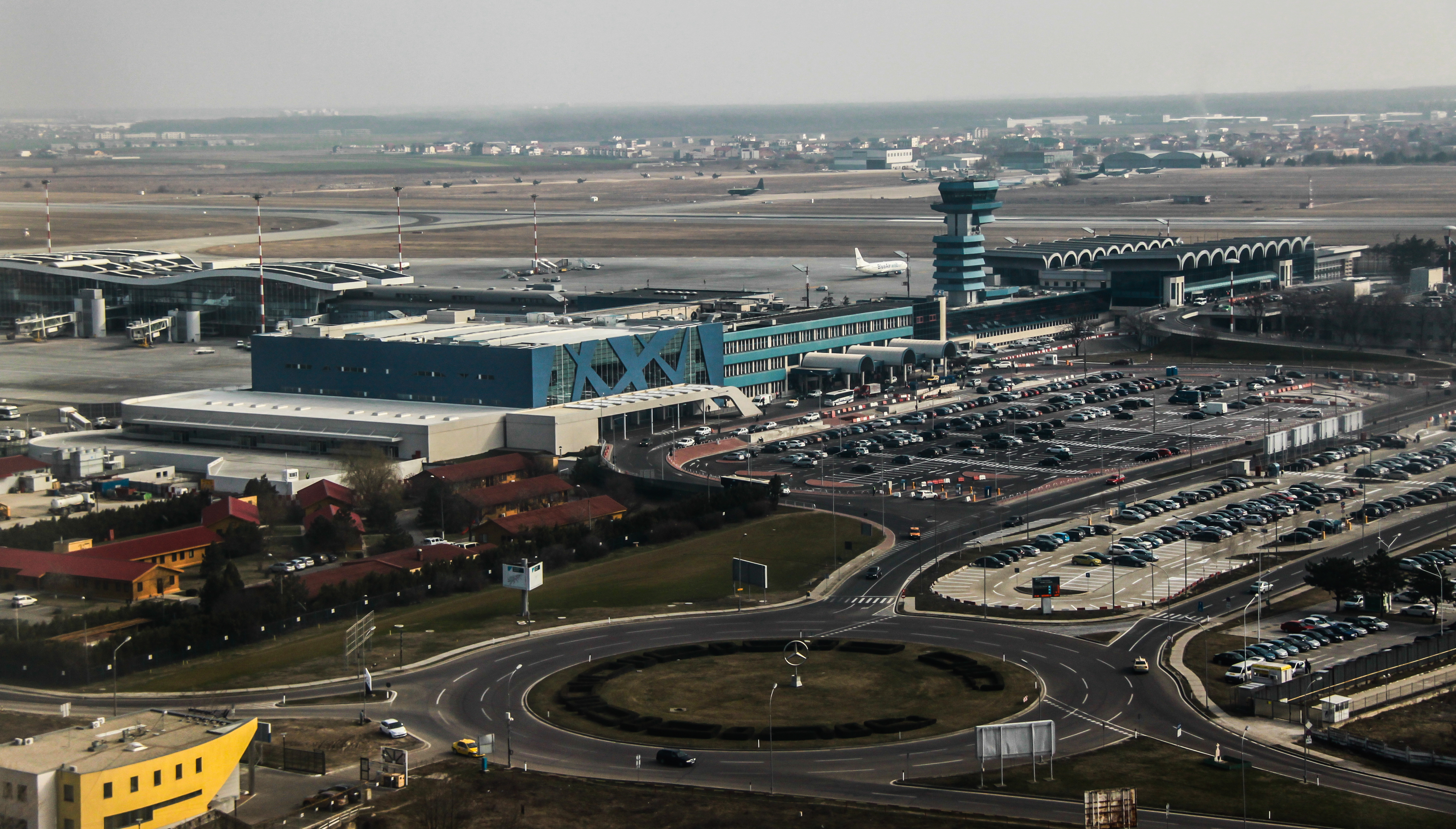
Henri Coandă International Airport is the busiest airport in Romania.

Rank	Airport	City	Code (IATA/ICAO)	Passengers	Annual change	Rank change
1.	Henri Coandă International Airport	Bucharest	OTP/LROP	14,622,263	▲16.1%	Steady
2.	Cluj Avram Iancu International Airport	Cluj-Napoca	CLJ/LRCL	3,240,750	▲22.5%	Steady
3.	Iași International Airport	Iași	IAS/LRIA	2,338,377	▲51.9%	Steady
4.	Traian Vuia International Airport	Timișoara	TSR/LRTR	1,354,859	▲13.5%	Steady
5.	Ștefan cel Mare International Airport	Suceava	SCV/LRSV	801,617	▲4.9%	Steady
6.	Craiova International Airport	Craiova	CRA/LRCV	597,990	▲25.5%	▲2
7.	Sibiu International Airport	Sibiu	SBZ/LRSB	550,397	▼11.4%	▼1
8.	Transilvania Airport	Târgu Mureș	TGM/LRTM	262,997	▲48.3%	▲2
9.	George Enescu International Airport	Bacău	BCM/LRBC	249,802	▼55.1%	▼2
10.	Oradea Airport	Oradea	OMR/LROD	152,543	▼26.8%	▼1
11.	Mihail Kogălniceanu International Airport	Constanța	CND/LRCK	113,544	▲44.2%	Steady
12.	Baia Mare Airport	Baia Mare	BAY/LRBM	89,940	▲17.8%	Steady
13.	Brașov-Ghimbav International Airport (Note: Brașov Airport became operational in June 2023.)	Brașov	GHV/LRBV	79,011	—	New entry
14.	Aurel Vlaicu International Airport	Bucharest	BBU/LRBS	68,130	▲607.9%	▲1
15.	Satu Mare International Airport	Satu Mare	SUJ/LRSM	56,396	▼6.9%	▼2
16.	Arad International Airport	Arad	ARW/LRAR	14,365	▼13.6%	▼2
17.	Danube Delta Tulcea Airport	Tulcea	TCE/LRTC	300	▼16.7%	▼1
Total				24,593,281	▲17.0%	

== 2022 ==
Rank	Airport	City	Code (IATA/ICAO)	Passengers	Annual change	Rank change
1.	Henri Coandă International Airport	Bucharest	OTP/LROP	12,591,905	▲82.7%	Steady
2.	Cluj Avram Iancu International Airport	Cluj-Napoca	CLJ/LRCL	2,644,968	▲81.2%	Steady
3.	Iași International Airport	Iași	IAS/LRIA	1,538,585	▲140.6%	Steady
4.	Traian Vuia International Airport	Timișoara	TSR/LRTR	1,193,923	▲89.7%	Steady
5.	Ștefan cel Mare International Airport	Suceava	SCV/LRSV	763,969	▲120.7%	▲1
6.	Sibiu International Airport	Sibiu	SBZ/LRSB	621,514	▲121.5%	▲1
7.	George Enescu International Airport	Bacău	BCM/LRBC	556,327	▲46.4%	▼2
8.	Craiova International Airport	Craiova	CRA/LRCV	476,613	▲148.9%	Steady
9.	Oradea Airport	Oradea	OMR/LROD	208,541	▲55.0%	Steady
10.	Transilvania Airport	Târgu Mureș	TGM/LRTM	177,342	▲95.7%	Steady
11.	Mihail Kogălniceanu International Airport	Constanța	CND/LRCK	78,713	▲50.0%	Steady
12.	Baia Mare Airport	Baia Mare	BAY/LRBM	76,363	▲72.5%	▲1
13.	Satu Mare International Airport	Satu Mare	SUJ/LRSM	60,568	▲28.1%	▼1
14.	Arad International Airport	Arad	ARW/LRAR	16,633	▲42.5%	Steady
15.	Aurel Vlaicu International Airport	Bucharest	BBU/LRBS	9,624	▲25.3%	Steady
16.	Danube Delta Tulcea Airport	Tulcea	TCE/LRTC	360	▲393.1%	Steady
Total				21,015,948	▲87.5%	

== 2021 ==
Rank	Airport	City	Code (IATA/ICAO)	Passengers	Annual change	Rank change
1.	Henri Coandă International Airport	Bucharest	OTP/LROP	6,891,449	▲54.6%	Steady
2.	Cluj Avram Iancu International Airport	Cluj-Napoca	CLJ/LRCL	1,459,255	▲62.3%	Steady
3.	Iași International Airport	Iași	IAS/LRIA	639,532	▲37.0%	▲1
4.	Traian Vuia International Airport	Timișoara	TSR/LRTR	629,353	▲33.7%	▼1
5.	George Enescu International Airport	Bacău	BCM/LRBC	379,947	▲208.8%	▲3
6.	Ștefan cel Mare International Airport	Suceava	SCV/LRSV	346,210	▲82.9%	Steady
7.	Sibiu International Airport	Sibiu	SBZ/LRSB	280,644	▲23.2%	▼2
8.	Craiova International Airport	Craiova	CRA/LRCV	191,510	▲20.0%	▼1
9.	Oradea Airport	Oradea	OMR/LROD	134,519	▲254.8%	▲2
10.	Transilvania Airport	Târgu Mureș	TGM/LRTM	90,626	▲6.5%	▼1
11.	Mihail Kogălniceanu International Airport	Constanța	CND/LRCK	52,465	▲22.3%	▼1
12.	Satu Mare International Airport	Satu Mare	SUJ/LRSM	47,280	▲85.1%	Steady
13.	Baia Mare Airport	Baia Mare	BAY/LRBM	44,266	▲155.2%	Steady
14.	Arad International Airport	Arad	ARW/LRAR	11,671	▲584.1%	▲1
15.	Aurel Vlaicu International Airport	Bucharest	BBU/LRBS	7,681	▼37.7%	▼1
16.	Danube Delta Tulcea Airport	Tulcea	TCE/LRTC	73	▲142.3%	Steady
Total				11,206,481	▲55.3%	

== 2020 ==
Rank	Airport	City	Code (IATA/ICAO)	Passengers	Annual change	Rank change
1.	Henri Coandă International Airport	Bucharest	OTP/LROP	4,456,577	▼69.7%	Steady
2.	Cluj Avram Iancu International Airport	Cluj-Napoca	CLJ/LRCL	899,311	▼69.2%	Steady
3.	Traian Vuia International Airport	Timișoara	TSR/LRTR	470,631	▼70.5%	Steady
4.	Iași International Airport	Iași	IAS/LRIA	466,708	▼64.5%	Steady
5.	Sibiu International Airport	Sibiu	SBZ/LRSB	227,838	▼68.7%	Steady
6.	Ștefan cel Mare International Airport	Suceava	SCV/LRSV	189,199	▼56.0%	▲2
7.	Craiova International Airport	Craiova	CRA/LRCV	159,552	▼68.9%	▼1
8.	George Enescu International Airport	Bacău	BCM/LRBC	123,019	▼73.7%	▼1
9.	Transilvania Airport	Târgu Mureș	TGM/LRTM	85,092	▼52.5%	Steady
10.	Mihail Kogălniceanu International Airport	Constanța	CND/LRCK	42,879	▼66.3%	Steady
11.	Oradea Airport	Oradea	OMR/LROD	37,911	▼ -60.1%	Steady
12.	Satu Mare International Airport	Satu Mare	SUJ/LRSM	25,547	▼69.6%	Steady
13.	Baia Mare Airport	Baia Mare	BAY/LRBM	17,344	▼57.6%	Steady
14.	Aurel Vlaicu International Airport	Bucharest	BBU/LRBS	12,329	▲76.7%	▲1
15.	Arad International Airport	Arad	ARW/LRAR	1,706	▼90.9%	▼1
16.	Danube Delta Tulcea Airport	Tulcea	TCE/LRTC	30	▼69.7%	Steady
Total				7,215,673	▼68.9%	

== 2019 ==
Rank	Airport	City	Code (IATA/ICAO)	Passengers	Annual change	Rank change
1.	Henri Coandă International Airport	Bucharest	OTP/LROP	14,697,239	▲6.3%	Steady
2.	Cluj Avram Iancu International Airport	Cluj-Napoca	CLJ/LRCL	2,921,392	▲5.0%	Steady
3.	Traian Vuia International Airport	Timișoara	TSR/LRTR	1,595,012	▲5.1%	Steady
4.	Iași International Airport	Iași	IAS/LRIA	1,313,921	▲4.6%	Steady
5.	Sibiu International Airport	Sibiu	SBZ/LRSB	729,160	▲10.1%	Steady
6.	Craiova International Airport	Craiova	CRA/LRCV	514,544	▲4.4%	Steady
7.	George Enescu International Airport	Bacău	BCM/LRBC	468,455	▲4.7%	Steady
8.	Ștefan cel Mare International Airport	Suceava	SCV/LRSV	430,064	▲21.8%	Steady
9.	Transilvania Airport	Târgu Mureș	TGM/LRTM	179,066	▲181.0%	▲3
10.	Mihail Kogălniceanu International Airport	Constanța	CND/LRCK	127,302	▼ -1.5%	Steady
11.	Oradea Airport	Oradea	OMR/LROD	94,977	▼ -56.8%	▼2
12.	Satu Mare International Airport	Satu Mare	SUJ/LRSM	84,171	▲11.2%	▼1
13.	Baia Mare Airport	Baia Mare	BAY/LRBM	40,902	▲1461.0%	▲2
14.	Arad International Airport	Arad	ARW/LRAR	18,739	▲64.8%	▼1
15.	Aurel Vlaicu International Airport	Bucharest	BBU/LRBS	6,975	▲22.6%	▼1
16.	Danube Delta Tulcea Airport	Tulcea	TCE/LRTC	99	▼ -37.3%	Steady
Total				23,222,018	▲6.2%	

== 2018 ==
Rank	Airport	City	Code (IATA/ICAO)	Passengers	Annual change	Rank change
1.	Henri Coandă International Airport	Bucharest	OTP/LROP	13,820,428	▲7.9%	Steady
2.	Cluj Avram Iancu International Airport	Cluj-Napoca	CLJ/LRCL	2,782,401	▲3.5%	Steady
3.	Traian Vuia International Airport	Timișoara	TSR/LRTR	1,517,309	▼6.4%	Steady
4.	Iași International Airport	Iași	IAS/LRIA	1,256,640	▲9.6%	Steady
5.	Sibiu International Airport	Sibiu	SBZ/LRSB	662,468	▲31.5%	Steady
6.	Craiova International Airport	Craiova	CRA/LRCV	493,056	▲10.2%	Steady
7.	George Enescu International Airport	Bacău	BCM/LRBC	447,531	▲5.1%	Steady
8.	Ștefan cel Mare International Airport	Suceava	SCV/LRSV	352,991	▲34.7%	Steady
9.	Oradea Airport	Oradea	OMR/LROD	220,012	▲35.1%	Steady
10.	Mihail Kogălniceanu International Airport	Constanța	CND/LRCK	129,235	▲1.3%	Steady
11.	Satu Mare International Airport	Satu Mare	SUJ/LRSM	75,692	▲24.5%	Steady
12.	Transilvania Airport	Târgu Mureș	TGM/LRTM	63,794	▲11,270%	▲3
13.	Arad International Airport	Arad	ARW/LRAR	11,367	▲5.1%	▼1
14.	Aurel Vlaicu International Airport	Bucharest	BBU/LRBS	5,690	▲0.8%	▼1
15.	Baia Mare Airport	Baia Mare	BAY/LRBM	2,621	▲	▲1
16.	Danube Delta Tulcea Airport	Tulcea	TCE/LRTC	158	▼86.6%	▼1
Total				21,858,724	▲7.8%	

== 2017 ==
Rank	Airport	City	Code (IATA/ICAO)	Passengers	Annual change	Rank change
1.	Henri Coandă International Airport	Bucharest	OTP/LROP	12,804,191	▲16.6%	Steady
2.	Cluj Avram Iancu International Airport	Cluj-Napoca	CLJ/LRCL	2,688,388	▲42.6%	Steady
3.	Traian Vuia International Airport	Timișoara	TSR/LRTR	1,621,529	▲39.7%	Steady
4.	Iași International Airport	Iași	IAS/LRIA	1,146,218	▲30.1%	Steady
5.	Sibiu International Airport	Sibiu	SBZ/LRSB	503,906	▲37.6%	▲1
6.	Craiova International Airport	Craiova	CRA/LRCV	447,227	▲101.1%	▲2
7.	George Enescu International Airport	Bacău	BCM/LRBC	425,733	▲2.7%	▼2
8.	Ștefan cel Mare Airport	Suceava	SCV/LRSV	262,165	▲359.4%	▲2
9.	Oradea Airport	Oradea	OMR/LROD	162,902	▲289.1%	▲2
10.	Mihail Kogălniceanu International Airport	Constanța	CND/LRCK	127,635	▲34.9%	▼1
11.	Satu Mare International Airport	Satu Mare	SUJ/LRSM	60,795	▲155.5%	▲1
12.	Arad International Airport	Arad	ARW/LRAR	10,817	▲	▲3
13.	Aurel Vlaicu International Airport	Bucharest	BBU/LRBS	5,645	▲5.0%	Steady
14.	Danube Delta Tulcea Airport	Tulcea	TCE/LRTC	4,232	▲300.4%	Steady
15.	Transilvania Airport	Târgu Mureș	TGM/LRTM	566	▼99.8%	▼8
16.	Baia Mare Airport	Baia Mare	BAY/LRBM	(closed for reconstruction)	Steady	Steady
Total				20,271,383	▲23.2%	

== 2016 ==
Rank	Airport	City	Code (IATA/ICAO)	Passengers	Annual change	Rank change
1.	Henri Coandă International Airport	Bucharest	OTP/LROP	10,982,967	▲18.3%	Steady
2.	Cluj Avram Iancu International Airport	Cluj-Napoca	CLJ/LRCL	1,884,645	▲26.7%	Steady
3.	Traian Vuia International Airport	Timișoara	TSR/LRTR	1,161,612	▲25.7%	Steady
4.	Iași International Airport	Iași	IAS/LRIA	881,157	▲133.8%	Steady
5.	George Enescu International Airport	Bacău	BCM/LRBC	414,676	▲13.8%	Steady
6.	Sibiu International Airport	Sibiu	SBZ/LRSB	366,065	▲32.3%	▲1
7.	Transilvania Airport	Târgu Mureș	TGM/LRTM	287,412	▼14.6%	▼1
8.	Craiova International Airport	Craiova	CRA/LRCV	222,320	▲90.1%	Steady
9.	Mihail Kogălniceanu International Airport	Constanța	CND/LRCK	94,594	▲49.4%	Steady
10.	Ștefan cel Mare Airport	Suceava	SCV/LRSV	57,063	▲2,419%	▲5
11.	Oradea Airport	Oradea	OMR/LROD	41,867	▲415.7%	▲3
12.	Satu Mare International Airport	Satu Mare	SUJ/LRSM	23,796	▲38.3%	▼2
13.	Aurel Vlaicu International Airport	Bucharest	BBU/LRBS	5,375	▼58,4%	▼1
14.	Danube Delta Tulcea Airport	Tulcea	TCE/LRTC	1,057	▲268.3%	▲2
15.	Arad International Airport	Arad	ARW/LRAR	-	▼	▼2
16.	Baia Mare Airport	Baia Mare	BAY/LRBM	0 (closed for reconstruction)	▼100%	▼5
Total				16,449,229	▲23.8%	

== 2015 ==
Rank	Airport	City	Code (IATA/ICAO)	Passengers (Note: Airport operating authority figures.)	Annual change	Passengers (Note: INSSE figures.)	Annual change	Rank change
1.	Henri Coandă International Airport	Bucharest	OTP/LROP	9,274,629	▲11.5%	9,274,287		Steady
2.	Cluj Avram Iancu International Airport	Cluj-Napoca	CLJ/LRCL	1,485,652	▲25.6%	1,485,634		Steady
3.	Traian Vuia International Airport	Timișoara	TSR/LRTR	924,459	▲25.6%	922,685		Steady
4.	Iași International Airport	Iași	IAS/LRIA	381,000	▲39.5%	381,709		▲2
5.	George Enescu International Airport	Bacău	BCM/LRBC	364,492	▲16.3%	363,166		Steady
6.	Transilvania Airport	Târgu Mureș	TGM/LRTM	336,694	▼1.9%	336,125		▼2
7.	Sibiu International Airport	Sibiu	SBZ/LRSB	276,533	▲28.1%	-		Steady
8.	Craiova International Airport	Craiova	CRA/LRCV	116,947	▼15.8%	-		Steady
9.	Mihail Kogălniceanu International Airport	Constanța	CND/LRCK	63,329	▲66.9%	-		Steady
10.	Satu Mare International Airport	Satu Mare	SUJ/LRSM	17,212	▲36.1%	-		▲3
11.	Baia Mare Airport	Baia Mare	BAY/LRBM	17,169	▼16.1%	-		▲1
12.	Aurel Vlaicu International Airport	Bucharest	BBU/LRBS	12,925	▲160.5%	-		▲2
13.	Arad International Airport	Arad	ARW/LRAR	8,530	▼69.8%	-		▼2
14.	Oradea Airport	Oradea	OMR/LROD	8,118	▼77.7%	-		▼4
15.	Ștefan cel Mare Airport	Suceava	SCV/LRSV	2,359	▲977%	-		▲1
16.	Danube Delta Tulcea Airport	Tulcea	TCE/LRTC	394	▼67.7%	-		▼1
Total				13,290,442	▲14%	13,272,745	▲14.5%	

== 2014 ==
Rank	Airport	City	Code (IATA/ICAO)	Passengers	Annual change	Rank change
1.	Henri Coandă International Airport	Bucharest	OTP/LROP	8,317,168	▲8.8%	Steady
2.	Cluj Avram Iancu International Airport	Cluj-Napoca	CLJ/LRCL	1,182,047	▲14.0%	Steady
3.	Traian Vuia International Airport	Timișoara	TSR/LRTR	735,469	▼13.7%	Steady
4.	Transilvania Airport	Târgu Mureș	TGM/LRTM	343,521	▼3.4%	Steady
5.	George Enescu International Airport	Bacău	BCM/LRBC	313,376	▼1.9%	Steady
6.	Iași International Airport	Iași	IAS/LRIA	273,047	▲17.7%	Steady
7.	Sibiu International Airport	Sibiu	SBZ/LRSB	215,952	▲12.3%	Steady
8.	Craiova International Airport	Craiova	CRA/LRCV	138,886	▲36.0%	▲1
9.	Mihail Kogălniceanu International Airport	Constanța	CND/LRCK	37,939	▼48.2%	▼1
10.	Oradea Airport	Oradea	OMR/LROD	36,501	▼7.4%	▲1
11.	Arad International Airport	Arad	ARW/LRAR	28,280	▼29.2%	▼1
12.	Baia Mare Airport	Baia Mare	BAY/LRBM	20,465	▲17.9%	▲1
13.	Satu Mare International Airport	Satu Mare	SUJ/LRSM	12,644	▼16.1%	▲1
14.	Aurel Vlaicu International Airport	Bucharest	BBU/LRBS	4,960	▼17.8%	▲1
15.	Danube Delta Tulcea Airport	Tulcea	TCE/LRTC	1,221	▼35.2%	▲1
16.	Ștefan cel Mare Airport	Suceava	SCV/LRSV	219	▼98.9%	▼4
Total				11,661,696		

== 2013 ==
Rank	Airport	City	Code (IATA/ICAO)	Passengers	Annual change	Rank change
1.	Henri Coandă International Airport	Bucharest	OTP/LROP	7,643,467	▲7.6%	Steady
2.	Cluj Avram Iancu International Airport	Cluj-Napoca	CLJ/LRCL	1,035,438	▲11.1%	▲1
3.	Traian Vuia International Airport	Timișoara	TSR/LRTR	757,096	▼27.1%	▼1
4.	Transilvania Airport	Târgu Mureș	TGM/LRTM	363,389	▲20.9%	▲2
5.	George Enescu International Airport	Bacău	BCM/LRBC	307,488	▼21.8%	Steady
6.	Iași International Airport	Iași	IAS/LRIA	231,933	▲33.9%	▲2
7.	Sibiu International Airport	Sibiu	SBZ/LRSB	189,152	▲7.1%	Steady
8.	Mihail Kogălniceanu International Airport	Constanța	CND/LRCK	73,301	▼22.5%	▲1
9.	Craiova International Airport	Craiova	CRA/LRCV	40,291	▲36.0%	▲2
10.	Arad International Airport	Arad	ARW/LRAR	39,901	▲168.8%	▲5
11.	Oradea Airport	Oradea	OMR/LROD	39,440	▼2.2%	▼1
12.	Ștefan cel Mare Airport	Suceava	SCV/LRSV	20,054	▼20.2%	Steady
13.	Baia Mare Airport	Baia Mare	BAY/LRBM	16,798	▼4.1%	▲1
14.	Satu Mare International Airport	Satu Mare	SUJ/LRSM	16,192	▼16.1%	▼1
15.	Aurel Vlaicu International Airport	Bucharest	BBU/LRBS	6,036	▼98.6%	▼11
16.	Danube Delta Tulcea Airport	Tulcea	TCE/LRTC	1,887	▲141.3%	Steady
Total				10,781,863		

== 2012 ==
Rank	Airport	City	Code (IATA/ICAO)	Passengers	Annual change	Rank change
1.	Henri Coandă International Airport	Bucharest	OTP/LROP	7,101,712	▲40.6%	Steady
2.	Traian Vuia International Airport	Timișoara	TSR/LRTR	1,039,109	▼13.5%	▲1
3.	Cluj Avram Iancu International Airport	Cluj-Napoca	CLJ/LRCL	931,999	▼7.2%	▲1
4.	Aurel Vlaicu International Airport	Bucharest	BBU/LRBS	424,016	▼82.3%	▼2
5.	George Enescu International Airport	Bacău	BCM/LRBC	393,340	▲16.7%	Steady
6.	Transilvania Airport	Târgu Mureș	TGM/LRTM	300,427	▲16.7%	Steady
7.	Sibiu International Airport	Sibiu	SBZ/LRSB	176,503	▼0.2%	▲1
8.	Iași International Airport	Iași	IAS/LRIA	173,248	▼5.9%	▼1
9.	Mihail Kogălniceanu International Airport	Constanța	CND/LRCK	94,641	▼28.4%	Steady
10.	Oradea Airport	Oradea	OMR/LROD	40,357	▲10.6% ('12-'10)	Steady
11.	Craiova International Airport	Craiova	CRA/LRCV	29,626	▲25.3% ('12-'10)	▲1
12.	Ștefan cel Mare Airport	Suceava	SCV/LRSV	25,143	▼7.5%	▼1
13.	Satu Mare International Airport	Satu Mare	SUJ/LRSM	19,289	▼17.8%	Steady
14.	Baia Mare Airport	Baia Mare	BAY/LRBM	17,523	▼21.9%	Steady
15.	Arad International Airport	Arad	ARW/LRAR	14,844	▲1220.6%	Steady
16.	Danube Delta Tulcea Airport	Tulcea	TCE/LRTC	782	▲83.1% ('12-'10)	Steady
Total				10,782,559		

== 2011 ==
Rank	Airport	City	Code (IATA/ICAO)	Passengers	Annual change	Rank change
1.	Henri Coandă International Airport	Bucharest	OTP/LROP	5,049,443	▲5.1%	Steady
2.	Aurel Vlaicu International Airport	Bucharest	BBU/LRBS	2,398,911	▲27.5%	Steady
3.	Traian Vuia International Airport	Timișoara	TSR/LRTR	1,202,925	▲5.9%	Steady
4.	Cluj Avram Iancu International Airport	Cluj-Napoca	CLJ/LRCL	1,004,855	▼2.3%	Steady
5.	George Enescu International Airport	Bacău	BCM/LRBC	336,961	▲39.9%	Steady
6.	Transilvania Airport	Târgu Mureș	TGM/LRTM	257,303	▲246%	▲3
7.	Iași International Airport	Iași	IAS/LRIA	184,225	▲15.4%	Steady
8.	Sibiu International Airport	Sibiu	SBZ/LRSB	176,908	▼11%	▼2
9.	Mihail Kogălniceanu International Airport	Constanța	CND/LRCK	73,713	▼1.1%	▼1
10.	Oradea Airport	Oradea	OMR/LROD	-	-	Steady
11.	Ștefan cel Mare Airport	Suceava	SCV/LRSV	27,208	▼21%	Steady
12.	Craiova International Airport	Craiova	CRA/LRCV	-	-	Steady
13.	Satu Mare International Airport	Satu Mare	SUJ/LRSM	23,469	▲24.4%	▲1
14.	Baia Mare Airport	Baia Mare	BAY/LRBM	22,462	▲18.1%	▼1
15.	Arad International Airport	Arad	ARW/LRAR	1,124	▼86.5%	Steady
16.	Danube Delta Tulcea Airport	Tulcea	TCE/LRTC	-	-	Steady
Total				10,759,507		

== 2010 ==
Rank	Airport	City	Code (IATA/ICAO)	Passengers	Annual change	Rank change
1.	Henri Coandă International Airport	Bucharest	OTP/LROP	4,802,510	▲7.2%	Steady
2.	Aurel Vlaicu International Airport	Bucharest	BBU/LRBS	1,881,509	▼4.7%	Steady
3.	Traian Vuia International Airport	Timișoara	TSR/LRTR	1,136,064	▲14.5%	Steady
4.	Cluj Avram Iancu International Airport	Cluj-Napoca	CLJ/LRCL	1,028,907	▲23.3%	Steady
5.	George Enescu International Airport	Bacău	BCM/LRBC	240,735	▲22.9%	Steady
6.	Sibiu International Airport	Sibiu	SBZ/LRSB	198,753	▲33.8%	▲1
7.	Iași International Airport	Iași	IAS/LRIA	159,615	▲7.4%	▼1
8.	Mihail Kogălniceanu International Airport	Constanța	CND/LRCK	74,587	▲8.6%	▲1
9.	Transilvania Airport	Târgu Mureș	TGM/LRTM	74,353	▼11.5%	▼1
10.	Oradea Airport	Oradea	OMR/LROD	36,477	▼12.5%	▲1
11.	Ștefan cel Mare Airport	Suceava	SCV/LRSV	34,437	▲5.7%	▲1
12.	Craiova International Airport	Craiova	CRA/LRCV	23,629	▲56.2%	▲2
13.	Baia Mare Airport	Baia Mare	BAY/LRBM	19,020	▼20.1%	Steady
14.	Satu Mare International Airport	Satu Mare	SUJ/LRSM	18,859	▲69.9%	▲1
15.	Arad International Airport	Arad	ARW/LRAR	8,359	▼81.3%	▼5
16.	Danube Delta Tulcea Airport	Tulcea	TCE/LRTC	427	▼50%	Steady
Total				9,738,241		

== 2009 ==
Rank	Airport	City	Code (IATA/ICAO)	Passengers	Annual change	Rank change
1.	Henri Coandă International Airport	Bucharest	OTP/LROP	4,480,765	▼11.5%	Steady
2.	Aurel Vlaicu International Airport	Bucharest	BBU/LRBS	1,974,337	▲14.4%	Steady
3.	Traian Vuia International Airport	Timișoara	TSR/LRTR	991,737	▲11.9%	Steady
4.	Cluj Avram Iancu International Airport	Cluj-Napoca	CLJ/LRCL	834,400	▲10.9%	Steady
5.	George Enescu International Airport	Bacău	BCM/LRBC	195,772	▲68%	▲2
6.	Iași International Airport	Iași	IAS/LRIA	148,538	▲3.1%	▼1
7.	Sibiu International Airport	Sibiu	SBZ/LRSB	148,527	▲5.3%	▼1
8.	Transilvania Airport	Târgu Mureș	TGM/LRTM	84,062	▲20.2%	▲1
9.	Mihail Kogălniceanu International Airport	Constanța	CND/LRCK	68,690	▲13.6%	▲1
10.	Arad International Airport	Arad	ARW/LRAR	44,743	▼42.6%	▼2
11.	Oradea Airport	Oradea	OMR/LROD	41,692	▲7.3%	Steady
12.	Ștefan cel Mare Airport	Suceava	SCV/LRSV	32,561	▲39.1%	Steady
13.	Baia Mare Airport	Baia Mare	BAY/LRBM	23,818	▲6.7%	Steady
14.	Craiova International Airport	Craiova	CRA/LRCV	15,130	▲16.5%	Steady
15.	Satu Mare International Airport	Satu Mare	SUJ/LRSM	11,101	▲52.1%	Steady
16.	Danube Delta Tulcea Airport	Tulcea	TCE/LRTC	854	▲8.3%	Steady
Total				9,096,199		

== 2008 ==
Rank	Airport	City	Code (IATA/ICAO)	Passengers	Annual change
1.	Henri Coandă International Airport	Bucharest	OTP/LROP	5,063,555	▲2.5%
2.	Aurel Vlaicu International Airport	Bucharest	BBU/LRBS	1,724,633	▲78.1%
3.	Traian Vuia International Airport	Timișoara	TSR/LRTR	886,083	▲3.1%
4.	Cluj Avram Iancu International Airport	Cluj-Napoca	CLJ/LRCL	752,181	▲92.6%
5.	Iași International Airport	Iași	IAS/LRIA	144,043	▲14%
6.	Sibiu International Airport	Sibiu	SBZ/LRSB	141,032	▲33.4%
7.	George Enescu International Airport	Bacău	BCM/LRBC	116,492	▲3.2%
8.	Arad International Airport	Arad	ARW/LRAR	78,047	-
9.	Transilvania Airport	Târgu Mureș	TGM/LRTM	69,945	▼55%
10.	Mihail Kogălniceanu International Airport	Constanța	CND/LRCK	60,477	▲42.8%
11.	Oradea Airport	Oradea	OMR/LROD	38,843	
12.	Ștefan cel Mare Airport	Suceava	SCV/LRSV	23,398	▲12.9%
13.	Baia Mare Airport	Baia Mare	BAY/LRBM	22,307	-
14.	Craiova International Airport	Craiova	CRA/LRCV	12,988	-
15.	Satu Mare International Airport	Satu Mare	SUJ/LRSM	7,298	-
16.	Danube Delta Tulcea Airport	Tulcea	TCE/LRTC	788	-
Total				9,142,110	

== See also ==
- Aviation in Romania
- List of airports in Romania
- List of the busiest airports in Europe
- Wikipedia:WikiProject Aviation/Airline destination lists: Europe#Romania
