= Direct Aero Services =

Romanian charter airline

| IATA | ICAO | Call sign |
|---|---|---|
| - | DSV | - |
- Founded: March 2007
- Ceased operations: March 2013
- Hubs: Aurel Vlaicu International Airport
- Fleet size: 8
- Destinations: 4
- Headquarters: Bucharest, Romania
- Website: http://www.aeroservices.ro/

Direct Aero Services was a charter airline based in Bucharest, Romania. Its main base was Aurel Vlaicu International Airport. In 2012, it changed its name to Romstrade Logistic Expres.

Romstrade Logistic Expres has suspended operations and its air operator certificate has been revoked on 7 March 2013.

== Destinations ==
| ^{Hub} | Hub |
| ^{*} | Focus city |
| ^{+} | Future destination |
| ^{Ø} | Charter |
| ^{#} | Terminated destination |

| City | Country | IATA | ICAO | Airport | Refs |
|---|---|---|---|---|---|
| Arad | Romania | ARW | LRAR | Arad Airport | |
| Bucharest | Romania | BBU | LRBS | Aurel Vlaicu International Airport ^{[hub]} | |
| Craiova | Romania | CRA | LRCV | Craiova Airport | |
| Tulcea | Romania | TCE | LRTC | Tulcea Airport | |

== Fleet ==
The Direct Aero Services fleet included the following aircraft (as of 30 November 2010):

| Aircraft type | Number of | Notes |
|---|---|---|
| SAAB 340A | 3 | |
| EC120B | 1 | |
| EC135P2+ | 1 | |
| Cessna Citation 510 | 2 | |
| Cessna T206H | 1 | |
Airbus A321
