= ARW =

ARW may refer to:

- American Revolutionary War
- Arad International Airport, Romania (IATA code: ARW)
- Arawak language of South America (ISO 639-2 and ISO 639-3 codes: arw)
- Army Ranger Wing, the special forces of the Irish military
- ARW, a raw image format used by Sony
- An Air Refueling Wing of the US Air Force
- Yes Featuring Jon Anderson, Trevor Rabin, Rick Wakeman, also abbreviated ARW
