= Remote and virtual tower =

Air traffic service not based at an airport

Remote and virtual tower (RVT) is a modern concept where the air traffic service (ATS) at an airport is performed somewhere other than in the local control tower. Although it was initially developed for airports with low traffic levels, such as Ornskoldsvik Airport, in 2021 it was implemented at a major international airport, London City Airport (84,260 aircraft movements in 2019).

The first remote tower implementation providing aerodrome ATS was approved and introduced into operations in Sweden in April 2015, with further implementations in other European Aviation Safety Agency Member States well underway. In 2019, Scandinavian Mountains Airport in Dalarna, Sweden, has been the world's first airport built without a traditional tower, to be controlled remotely.

The concept is also considered as contingency measures for major airports or for apron control only.

== Concept ==
Instead of being located in an airport tower, the air traffic control officer (ATCO) or aerodrome flight information services officer (AFISO) work at a remote tower centre (RTC) from where they provide the ATS. The data comes from airport cameras and sensors rather than from an out-of-window view, which is reconstructed as a high-resolution video panorama on a large screen or series of screens.

The RVT concept is aiming at providing:

- Remote tower services at small and medium size airports, by personnel located at a remote tower centre somewhere else.
- Contingency services at major airports, in the case of fire or other events which could take place at the control tower building. The contingency facility should be at safe, nearby, but different physical location.
- Synthetic augmentation of vision to increase situational awareness at airports during poor visibility conditions at the local airport control tower facilities.

The full range of air traffic services defined in International Civil Aviation Organization Documents 4444, 9426 and Eurocontrol's Manual for AFIS will still be provided remotely by an ATCO or AFISO. The airspace users should be provided with the appropriate level of services as if the ATS were provided locally at the airport.

The SESAR Joint Undertaking projects are looking at RVT concepts, based on either one person controlling one airport, or one person controlling multiple airports.

== Modes of operation ==
- Single remote tower: air traffic controller(s) control a single aerodrome.
- Multiple remote tower operations (MRTO): one or more operators are controlling more than one aerodrome at the same time (simultaneously) or in sequence.
- Contingency tower: to be used in case the traditional airport tower is unserviceable (e.g. fire), to provide basic level of service. A world's first, Heathrow's Virtual Contingency facility (VCF), unveiled in 2009, housed away from the airfield in a windowless room, can operate at up to 70% of its flights.
- Supplementary remote tower: an extra tower in to provide an unobstructed view for a new runway in case of airport expansion.

== Beginnings ==
In 1996, at a scientific colloquium of the DLR Institute of Flight Guidance, Kraiss and Kuhlen proposed a "Virtual Holography" concept for ATC with a projected virtual workbench showing the aerodrome traffic in 3D that could be observed at any angle by the air traffic controller.

In 2001, a "Virtual Tower (ViTo)" concept won the DLR's first Visionary Projects (Wettbewerb der Visionen, WdV) competition with €200,000 awarded for the first two years of research, beginning in 2002. The idea described a remote ATC control room with video-sensor based surveillance instead of 'out-of-the-window' view from a real tower. The initial trials of remote ATS, for low and medium-density airports, have been based on optical sensors (cameras), providing the ATCOs at the RTC with a high-quality real-time image of the runway, the airport apron (ramp) and the very nearby airspace. These real-time images are displayed at large monitors providing up to 360-degree view.

Beside the live video feed from the airport, the ATCOs have available the same air traffic management computer systems as they would have in a local control tower building, being voice communication systems, meteorological systems, flight plan systems, and Surveillance display systems. The level of equipage might depend on whether it is a controlled TWR service, or a Flight Information Service being provided at the specific airport. Depending on the complexity of the airport, the traffic densities, and weather conditions, it might be preferable to complement the optical images with an advanced surface movement guidance and control system (A-SMGCS) with signal inputs from surface movement radar (SMR) and/or Local Area Multilateration (LAM).

== Development and validation ==
The RVT concept is under development, besides of other former research & development initiatives (e.g. by DLR, DFS, LFV, Searidge Technologies, SAAB, FREQUENTIS, Indra Sistemas or the FP6 EU project ART, etc.), as part of the SESAR Joint Undertaking (SJU), where Work Package 6 develops the operational concepts, while Work Package 12 develops the corresponding technology to enable the RVT functionality. Live validation trials were planned at a few selected airports in Germany, Spain (ENAIRE), Norway (Avinor) and Sweden (LFV) as part of SESAR Joint Undertaking Projects 06.08.04 and 06.09.03 during the years 2012–2015.

Airservices Australia intended to evaluate RVT technology from Saab Group at Alice Springs airport in Central Australia from late 2012, with the control centre placed in Adelaide. In 2019, Airservices Australia selected Searidge as the provider for Digital Aerodrome Services Program at Sydney Airport (SYD) and possibly other Australian aerodromes, to start digital tower trials in 2020.

In March 2009, Saab Group and LFV carried out a live shadow mode demonstration of their existing remote tower concept. This demonstration took place at a remote tower centre facility established at Malmö air traffic control centre (ATCC), controlling a flight in and out of Ängelholm airport (ICAO:ESTA) in southern Sweden. As a contingency mechanism during this trial, the local control tower at Ängelholm was staffed by ATCOs.

In 2010 DLR carried out the first human in the loop remote tower center simulation, whereas a remote controller operated traffic at two different low frequented airports simultaneously. Despite several biases the controllers' situation awareness was over-average and their workload remained in average range and operational feasibility could be shown the first time.

DLR Institute of Flight Guidance, Saab Group, LVF, Indra and DFS have been the major driving forces behind the Remote Tower development, and are all represented in the SESAR Joint Undertaking projects, SAAB through North European ATM Industry Group (NATMIG) and LFV NORACON.

During ATC Global in Amsterdam in 8–10 March 2011, SESAR Joint Undertaking had a ceremony where Project 6.9.3 'Remote & Virtual Tower' was given the award for 'most advanced for deployment'. The prize was presented by executive director of SESAR Joint Undertaking, Mr Patrick Ky, and received by Project 6.9.3 Project Manager Mr Göran Lindqvist, NORACON.

In June 2016, Irish Aviation Authority was granted SESAR Joint Undertaking funding for remote tower demonstration. Upon validating single mode operations, the project tested multiple remote tower operations (MRTO) to provide services for Shannon and Cork simultaneously. The Dublin-based centre used SAAB-engineered technology.

In Scotland, Highlands and Islands Airports Limited (HIAL) planned to relocate 5 of their 11 towers (Inverness, 31,338 aircraft movements in 2019; Dundee, 43,354 a/c movements; Sumburgh, 18,056 a/c movements; Kirkwall, 14,247 a/c movements; Stornoway, 9444 a/c movements in 2019) to a remote tower centre in Inverness. The Combined Surveillance Centre (CSC) £34 million project was the largest in the UK. The first airport was expected to be operational in 2023, the last in 2027. However, due to staff protests and subsequent reduction in funding, with almost £10 million spent, the project was cancelled on 24 August 2022.

== Operation and implementation ==
As of 21 April 2015 12:00 am, the airport of Örnsköldsvik/Gideå (OER/ESNO) is run using remote ATC services from Sundsvall/Midlanda (SDL/ESNN). This is reported to be the first production deployment of RVT in the world. The system was tested at Leesburg Executive Airport in summer 2015.

In December 2019, a new airport (Scandinavian Mountains Airport, SCR/ESKS) was opened in Sweden without any traditional tower, being the first airport with only virtual tower (operated from Sundsvall).

On 1 October 2015 the FAA announced Northern Colorado Regional Airport (FNL/KFNL) (formerly known as Fort Collins-Loveland Municipal Airport) as the first official FAA approved Virtual Air Traffic Control Tower test site in the United States. The equipment and Searidge Technologies Remote Tower System were installed at the airport in 2018–2019, with initial testing and assessments of the new virtual technology commencing shortly thereafter. Plans for certification and opening of the remote tower in 2023 have been delayed due to COVID-19.

To provide efficient workforce coverage and lower airport operating costs, German air navigation provider DFS decided to shift all Saarbrücken, Erfurt, and Dresden air traffic operations to a Remote Tower Control Center in Leipzig. On 4 December 2018, a Luxair regional airliner arriving at Saarbrücken Airport was the first aircraft remotely cleared for landing from the Deutsche Flugsicherung (DFS) Remote Tower Control Center 450 kilometers (280 miles) east in Leipzig. Airport Erfurt followed in 2022, Airport Dresden is planned to go operationally in 2024. DFS developed its remote tower system together with the Austrian technology company Frequentis, while the video and infrared sensors come from the German group Rheinmetall Defence Electronics. DLR supported the development and validation phase with a prototype test installation at Airport Erfurt and concept validations via real-time simulations in its Remote Tower Laboratory at DLR, Braunschweig (2012-2016).

On 13 December 2018, the first in the UK remote tower at Digital Air Traffic Control Centre opened at Cranfield Airport (EGTC). The technology was supplied by SAAB and air traffic controllers were located in a building 400 yards away from the old tower.

On 20 October 2020, Avinor opened a remote control tower center situated in Bodø, Norway, as a cost effective solution intended for STOLports in Norway with little traffic. The remote tower technology is planned to be rolled out to a total of 15 airports in Norway by the end of 2022. The first airport to be controlled from there was Vardø Airport (750 km away) on 7 October 2020. As of October 2022, 8 airports were remotely controlled from this center, having about a year delayed plan.

London City Airport (LCY/EGLC) switched to remote ATC provided by NATS from their centre in Swanwick in early 2021.

In Romania, Brașov-Ghimbav International Airport, which commenced flights on 15 June 2023, has a fully remote system, operated from 400 km (250 mi) away at Arad International Airport.

In Germany the development of a remote tower system was conducted at DLR Institute of Flight Guidance in Braunschweig. Since 2018 a remote tower operation center is operated by Deutsche Flugsicherung at Leipzig Airport. Starting with a provision of remote air traffic services to Saarbrücken Airport over a distance of 450 kilometres. Later the system was extended to cover also Dresden Airport and Erfurt–Weimar Airport.

Since 2024, DFS Aviation Services GmbH (DAS), an affiliate of Deutsche Flugsicherung, is providing air navigation services at the Braunschweig-Wolfsburg and Emden airports centrally from Braunschweig. This remote tower system was manufactured by FREQUENTIS.

In 2026, the newly opened Western Sydney Airport commenced passenger services on 25 October 2026. The flights are controlled by an remote air traffic control base, located in a data centre at Eastern Creek, Sydney. The hardware monitoring devices at the airport are located on a 45-metre tall tower, equipped with over 20 high-definition, thermal and pan-tilt cameras that are all onsite. At the control centre, air traffic controllers receive 360 video feeds, night vision, and infrared data through a high speed network that uses Transgrid's Lumea fibre-optic lines.

The following list contains all airports that use, test, trial or have cancelled plans for remote air traffic control.

Site/airport	Type	ICAO	Vendor	Status	Notes
Buenos Aires Ezeiza International Airport	Remote tower	SAEZ	Frequentis	Planned	
Airservices Adelaide Centre	Remote tower centre	N/A	Saab	Cancelled	2012 remote tower trial hub
Alice Springs Airport	Remote tower	YBAS	Saab	Cancelled	2012 remote tower trial
Sydney Airport	Test/Validation Site	YSSY	Searidge	Trial	
Western Sydney Airport	Remote tower	YSWS	Frequentis	Operational	Airservices Australia Digital Aerodrome Service Centre, Eastern Creek held for testing/trial
Charleroi Airport	Remote tower	EBCI	Saab	Planned	
[icon]					
...					

== Standardisation ==
In 2014 the European Organisation for Civil Aviation Equipment founded the Working Group (WG) 100 "Remote and Virtual Tower". The WG-100 was launched under the Chair of the German Aerospace Center – DLR and Eurocontrol in the Secretary role. WG-100 further consists of active contributors (air navigation service manufacturers & service providers) from more than 30 companies worldwide and acts in close coordination with European Aviation Safety Agency, International Civil Aviation Organization, SESAR, and the most recent SESAR2020 project "PJ05 Remote Tower". The group was tasked as a first step to develop standards for remote towers optical systems. In September 2016 the ED-240 Minimum Aviation System Performance Specification for Remote Tower Optical Systems document was published. These MASPS are applicable to all optical sensor configurations (visible, as well as infrared spectrum) to be used for the implementation of the remote provision of ATS to an aerodrome, encompassing the whole chain from sensor to display. This standard should help vendors and customers to quantify an optimal operational system performance and to verify it in a standardised way.

Subsequently, the WG-100 work focused on an extension of the previous MASPS (revision A) to include 'visual tracking' and automatic Pan-Tilt-Zoom (PTZ) camera object following technologies. 'Visual tracking' is understood as the augmentation of the display of objects on the visual presentation by using information obtained only by image processing of the video from the optical sensors for the purpose of increasing the operator's situation awareness. The PTZ Object Following function attaches the PTZ camera to a moving target and persistently follows and displays it automatically. The MASPS ED-240A have been published on 13 November 2018.

In February 2019, the European Aviation Safety Agency published Guidance Material on remote aerodrome air traffic services, outlining operational context, single and multiple modes of operation, system and training considerations, management of change, and possible impact on airspace users. The material includes checklists for implementation and operational use.

In January 2021, the Civil Air Navigation Services Organisation (CANSO) published CANSO Guidance Material for Remote and Digital Towers, containing definitions, background and technology information, challenges and benefits, four case studies and guidance on starting remote tower operations. An updated second edition was published in August 2023, including new sections on “Centralisation of services and information”, “Digital Towers Interdependencies”, “Lifecycle Management”, “Advanced Concept Applications”, “Drone Management and Detection” and new implementation case studies.

== Possible benefits ==
The main benefit of RVT is expected to be cost efficiency.

The cost savings originate from the following factors:

- No need to build and maintain control tower buildings and facilities at the local airports. The building and operational costs of a remote tower and facilities are much lower compared to a traditional tower.
- More efficient use of human resources (ATCOs and AFISOs), especially by serving multiple airports with medium to low traffic levels from a centralised location.
- Reduced need to establish and maintain ATM systems locally at the airports. By using data communication networks from the local airport to the remote tower centre, several technical systems can be centralised, hence costs savings are possible. Over 75% of regional airports with fewer than 1 million passengers a year are making a loss. These costs could be shared, saving 1.3 million euro per year (in case of Shannon and Cork airports being controlled from Dublin).

Remote air traffic control enables airports to cost efficiently serve flights which either are scheduled outside the core opening hours of the airport, or by being able to serve non-scheduled traffic (ambulance flights and search-and-rescue helicopters) with an air traffic service during night time when a smaller airports would normally be closed.

In comparison to early cost-benefit calculations (e.g. by LFV-ROT in 2008), improvements in technology made the concept even more feasible, e.g. video adopted the HD standard and the cost of high-resolution cameras decreased from over €10,000 to less than €5,000 circa 2018.

Airports with low traffic levels can be controlled simultaneously (Multiple Remote Tower Operations – MRTO), like at the Remote Tower Centre concept at Dublin Airport to provide air traffic services for located over 100 miles away Cork (21,442 aircraft movements in 2019) and Shannon (13,151 movements in 2019). In 2016, total movements were 50,242. Compared to a traditional tower, MRTO for Shannon and Cork in Ireland was anticipated to provide savings of four air traffic control officer's (ATCO) salaries (£400,000/year) and lower maintenance and build costs (saving £800,000/year).

== Controversy ==
Savings expressed in terms of controller salaries raise redundancy concerns. In Scotland, HIAL's air traffic staff at 4 affected airports were expected to relocate from the islands to the new remote centre in Inverness, but only 11% (6 out of 54 received survey responses) or 7% (6 out of expected 90 responses) of employees wanted to take up employment at the new centre, with some of those considering daily commuting instead of relocation. The Prospect trade union representing air traffic controllers in the UK assessed the plans as having "very significant negative impacts" on the local economy if the centralisation plans go ahead, with 48 staff at the risk of redundancy (£2.2 million gross annual salaries) at "very significant expense to the taxpayer" (£9.9 million spent until August 2022). On 24 August 2022, HIAL decided to close the project due to significant reduction in government funding.

The International Federation of Air Traffic Controllers' Associations (IFATCA) is critical of the multiple simultaneous mode of operation due to limitations of trials: all simulated scenarios are selected samples of reality with possible blind spots, and present incoherent results. The workload study is also missing, and the savings for aerodromes and airlines are uncertain.

In 2020, European Cockpit Association (ECA) did not support multiple mode of operations for similar reasons, citing more research required "of human factors, operational and technical implications and adequate mitigation measures". Since very few air traffic controllers held ratings for more than one tower, the impact of changing airports, procedures and weather conditions in one shift on situational awareness had not been adequately studied, and such frequent changes might cause errors and decrease safety of operations.
