= Animawings =

Airline of Romania

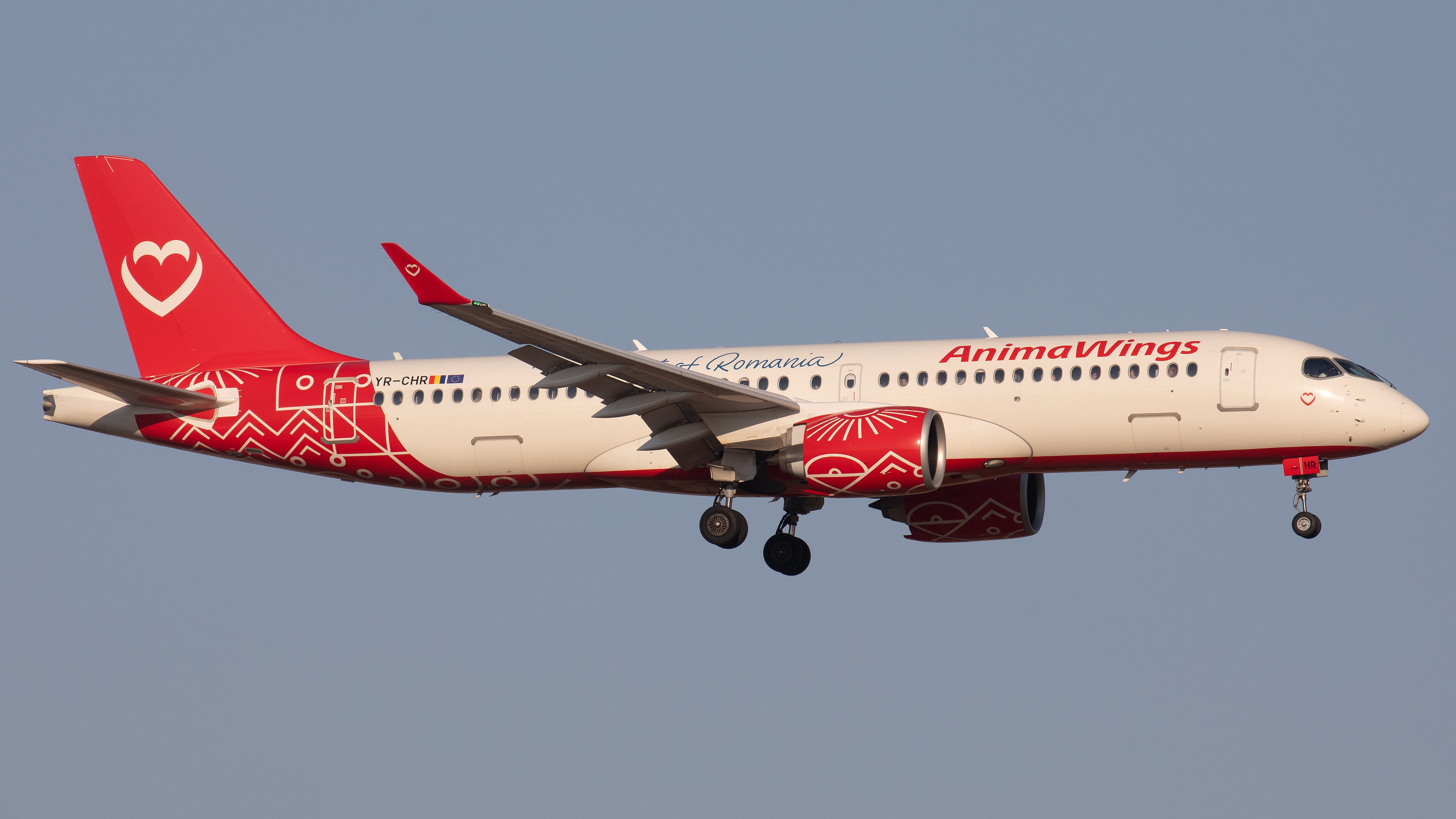
- Former Animawings Airbus A220-300
IATA	ICAO	Call sign
A2	AWG	ANIMA WINGS
- Founded: 2019; 7 years ago
- AOC #: RO-067
- Operating bases: Bucharest–Otopeni, Timișoara
- Fleet size: 2
- Parent company: Memento Group
- Headquarters: Otopeni, Ilfov County, Romania
- Key people: Antonio Stoian (CEO)
- Website: www.animawings.com

Animawings (stylised as AnimaWings) is a Romanian airline headquartered in Otopeni, Romania. It is based at Henri Coandă International Airport in Bucharest and operates regular and charter commercial flights. From summer of 2024, the airline began serving business and leisure destinations from ten cities across Romania.

In September 2026, the airline filed for insolvency, paused all operations, and withdrew six Airbus A220 aircraft from its fleet.

== History ==
In March 2020, it was announced that Aegean Airlines had taken a 25% stake in the airline. The major part of the airline (75%) is owned by the Memento Group, a tour operator. In July 2020, the airline secured its Air Operator's Certificate (AOC) and launched operations operating charter flights. In January 2021, the airline began selling tickets on its own website from 11 airports in Romania to destinations in Africa, Europe and Middle East.

In October 2021, Aegean Airlines increased its stake to 51%.

In February 2024, after eight months of negotiations, the Romanian Competition Council approved Memento Group's purchase of the shares back from Aegean, now owning 100% of the airline.

In April 2026, a consortium of BT Asset Management, Winners Holding Investments, and Evergent Investments bid to acquire a combined 50% stake of the airline. Despite pre-clearances by regulatory institutions, the deal had not been executed as it had some conditional agreements that were not fulfilled.

In September 2026, Animawings filed for protected insolvency with the last flights operating on 2 October.

It also disposed of its six Airbus A220 aircraft and paused all operations. On 4 November 2026, the Romanian Civil Aeronautical Authority officially suspended the airline's air operator's certificate.

== Destinations ==
Prior to pausing all operations in September 2026, Animawings operated scheduled flights to the following destinations:

Country	City	Airport	Notes	Ref.
Cyprus	Larnaca	Larnaca International Airport		
Czech Republic	Prague	Václav Havel Airport		
Finland	Kittilä	Kittilä Airport	Seasonal	
France	Nice	Nice Côte d'Azur Airport	Seasonal	
France	Paris	Charles de Gaulle Airport		
Germany	Munich	Munich Airport		
Greece	Athens	Athens International Airport		
Greece	Corfu	Corfu International Airport	Seasonal	
Greece	Heraklion	Heraklion International Airport	Seasonal	
Greece	Kavala	Kavala International Airport	Seasonal	
Greece	Kefalonia	Kefalonia International Airport	Seasonal	
Greece	Rhodes	Rhodes International Airport	Seasonal	
Greece	Thessaloniki	Thessaloniki International Airport	Seasonal	
Greece	Zakynthos	Zakynthos International Airport	Seasonal	
Israel	Tel Aviv	David Ben Gurion Airport		
Italy	Milan	Milan Malpensa Airport		
Italy	Olbia	Olbia Costa Smeralda Airport	Seasonal	
Morocco	Marrakesh	Marrakesh Menara Airport	Seasonal	
Netherlands	Rotterdam	Rotterdam The Hague Airport	Seasonal	
Portugal	Faro	Faro International Airport	Seasonal	
Romania	Brașov	Brașov-Ghimbav International Airport	Seasonal	
Romania	Bucharest	Henri Coandă International Airport	Hub	
Romania	Cluj-Napoca	Cluj International Airport		
Romania	Craiova	Craiova International Airport		
Romania	Iași	Iași International Airport		
Romania	Oradea	Oradea International Airport		
Romania	Suceava	Suceava Ștefan cel Mare International Airport		
Romania	Timișoara	Timișoara Traian Vuia International Airport	Operational base	
Spain	Gran Canaria	Gran Canaria Airport	Seasonal	
Spain	Ibiza	Ibiza Airport	Seasonal	
Spain	Palma de Mallorca	Palma de Mallorca Airport	Seasonal	
Spain	Tenerife	Tenerife South Airport	Seasonal	
Sweden	Stockholm	Stockholm Arlanda Airport		
Switzerland	Geneva	Geneva Airport		
United Arab Emirates	Abu Dhabi	Zayed International Airport	Seasonal	
United Arab Emirates	Dubai	Al Maktoum International Airport		
United Kingdom	London	London Gatwick Airport		
Turkey	Istanbul	Istanbul Airport		

=== Codeshare and interline agreements ===
Animawings has a codeshare agreement with Aegean Airlines and a Interline agreement with Hahn Air.

== Fleet ==
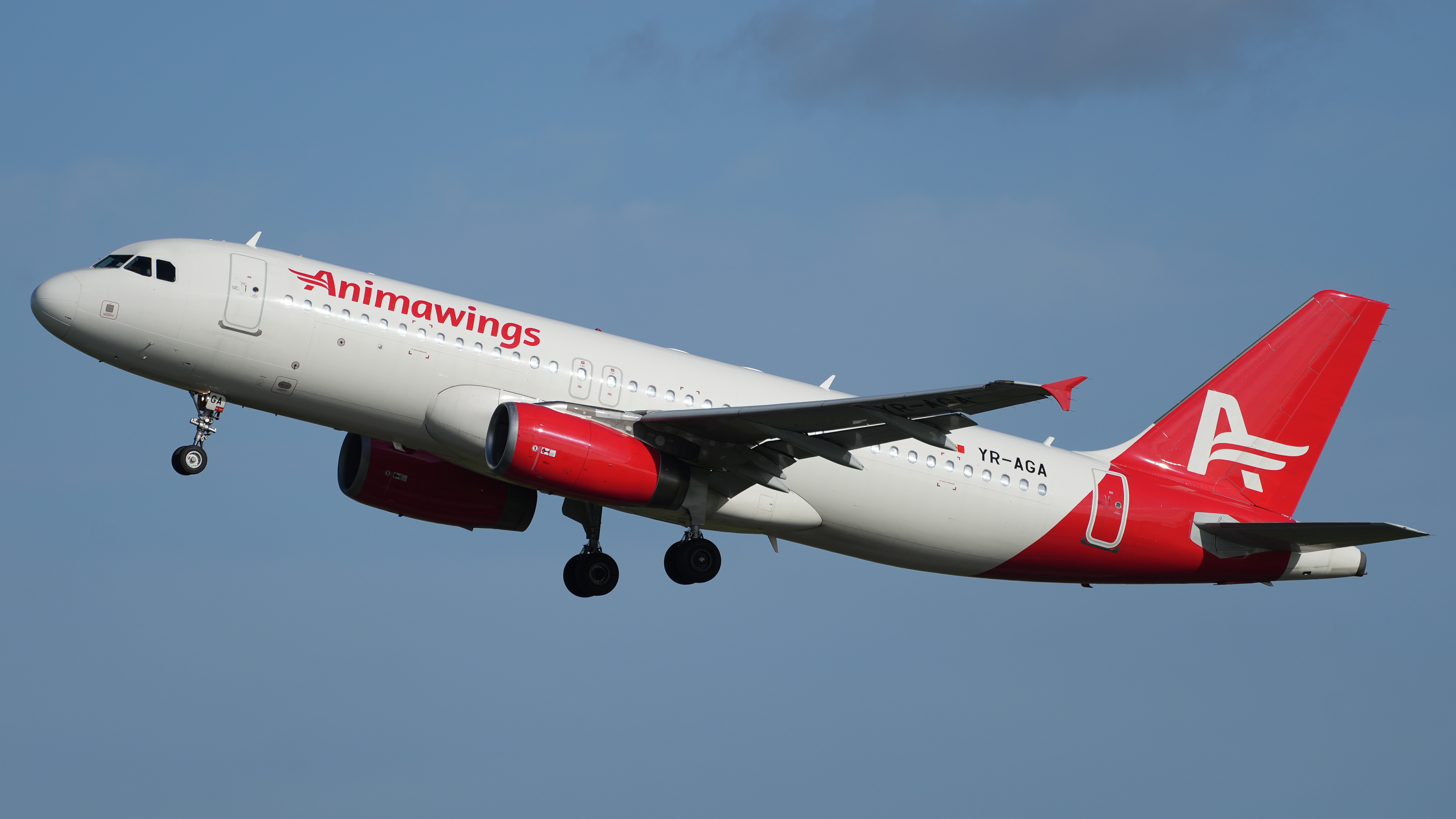
Animawings A320 in the former livery

=== Current fleet ===
As of October 2026, Animawings operates the following aircraft:

Animawings fleet
Aircraft	In service	Orders	Passengers			Notes
Aircraft	In service	Orders	C	Y	Total	Notes
Airbus A320-200	2	—	—	180	180	
Total	2					

=== Former fleet ===
Animawings retired fleet
Aircraft	Number	Introduced	Retired	Notes
Airbus A220-300	6	2024–2026	2026	Disposed of when the airline filed for insolvency.
