= Târgu Mureș International Airport =

Târgu Mureș Transylvania Airport Aeroportul Transilvania Târgu Mureș

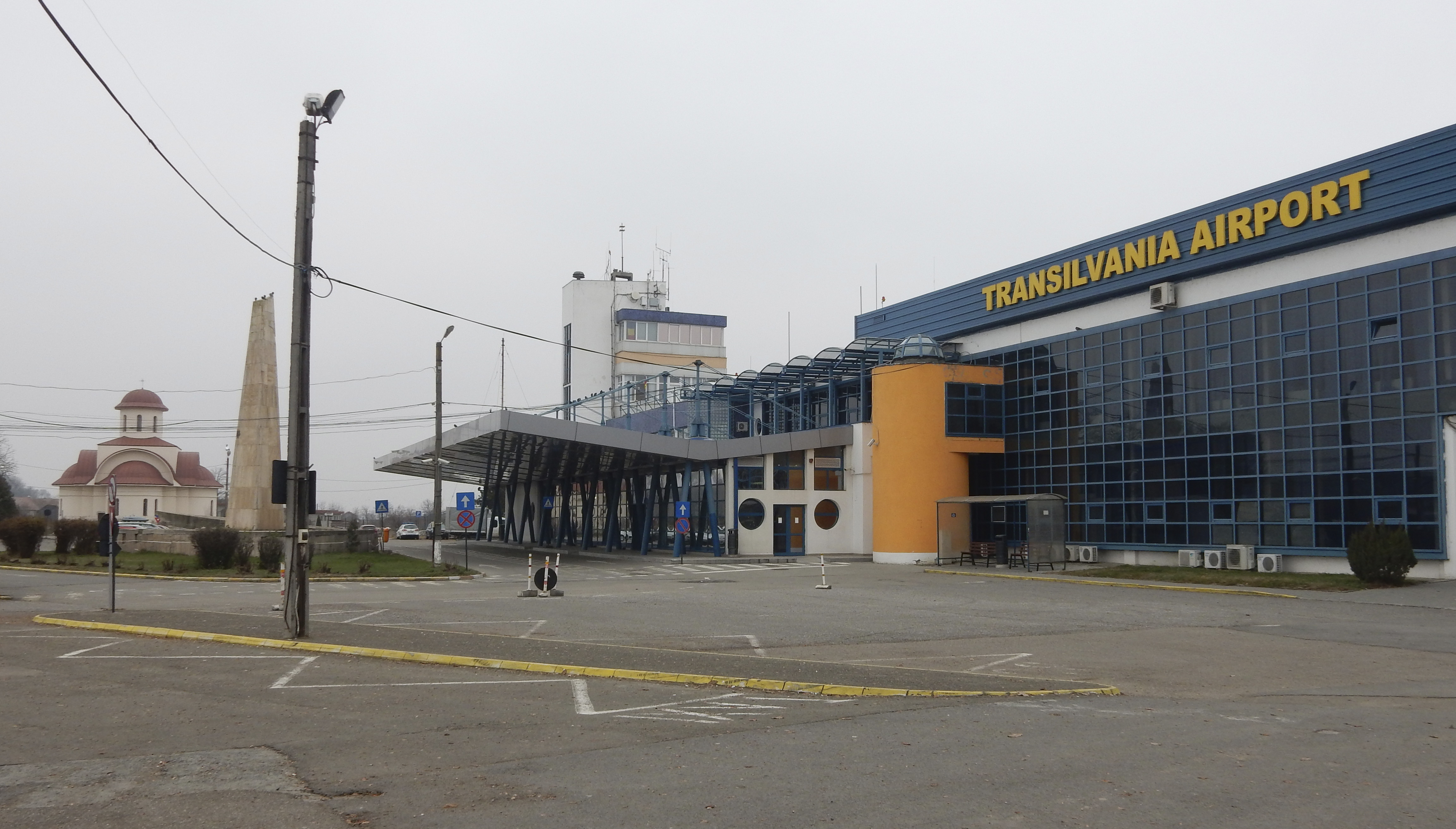
- IATA: TGM; ICAO: LRTM

Summary
- Airport type: Public
- Owner: Mureș County Council
- Serves: Târgu Mureș
- Location: Vidrasău, Mureș County
- Opened: 1969
- Focus city for: Wizz Air
- Elevation AMSL: 963 ft (294 m)
- Coordinates: 46°28′04″N 024°24′45″E
- Website: aeroportultransilvania.ro

Map
- The airport's location in Romania

Runways
Direction	Length		Surface
Direction	m	ft	Surface
07/25	2,000	6,562	Asphalt

Statistics (2025)
- Passengers: 153,264 ▼
- Aircraft movements: 1,513 ▼
- Source: AIP at the Romanian Airports Association (RAA)

Târgu Mureș Transilvania Airport (Romanian: Aeroportul Transilvania Târgu Mureș; Hungarian: Marosvásárhelyi Transilvania Repülőtér) (IATA: TGM, ICAO: LRTM) is an international airport located 14 km (8.7 mi) southwest of Târgu Mureș, Mureș County, in central Romania. Until May 2006, the official name was Târgu Mureș Vidrasău Airport (for the village 17 km (11 mi) outside of Târgu Mureș where it is located).

== History ==
Opened in 1936, Târgu Mureș's first airport was built 2.5 kilometers away from the city centre. The airport was rebuilt in its current location in the 1960s, and inaugurated in 1969. The old location continues to serve recreational aviation, under the name "Aeroportul Sportiv Elie Carafoli" and ICAO code LRMS.

In December 2016, the county council administrator started a new modernization program. The project involved the refurbishment of the runway and the apron (an estimated RON77 million investment). The auction was won by the Porr-Geiger Association, while construction began in early October 2017 and ended in June 2018. On 25 June 2018, the new runway went into operation.

== Airlines and destinations ==
The following airlines operate regular scheduled and charter flights at Târgu Mureș Airport:

Airlines	Destinations
Sky Express	Seasonal charter: Heraklion
Wizz Air	Alicante (begins 14 January 2027), Basel/Mulhouse, Beauvais, Bergamo (ends 15 December 2026), Budapest, Charleroi, Dortmund, Larnaca (ends 16 December 2026), London–Luton, Memmingen, Nuremberg (begins 20 December 2026), Rome–Fiumicino

== Statistics ==
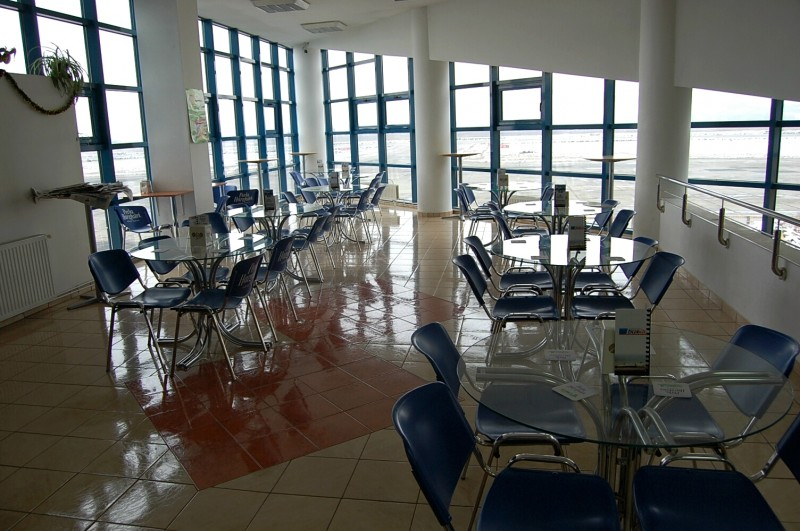
Departure area

Year	Passengers	Change	Movements	Change
2005	12,408	▲67%		
2006	46,882	▲278%		
2007	156,929	▲235%		
2008	69,945	▼55%		
2009	84,062	▲20%		
2010	74,353	▼12%		
2011	257,303	▲246%		
2012	300,427	▲17%		
2013	356,656	▲19%	3,301	
2014	343,521	▼3.4%	3,139	▼4.9%
2015	336,694	▼1.9%	3,068	▼2.3%
2016	287,412	▼14.7%		
2017	566	▼407.8%		
2018	63,794	▲11.3%	435	
2019	179,066	▲181%		
2020	85,949	▼52%		
2021	90,626	▲5.4%		
2022	177,342	▲95.7%	1,877	
2023	261,402	▲47.4%	2,152	▲14.6%
2024	213,312	▼18.9%	1,802	▼16.3%
2024	153,264	▼28.2%	1,513	▼16.0%

== Future developments ==
In April 2025, local authorities announced plans for a major expansion project called "Transilvania 2", aiming to increase passenger capacity and modernize the airport facilities.

== See also ==
- List of the busiest airports in Romania
- List of airports in Romania
- Aviation in Romania
- Transport in Romania
