= Brașov Airport =

Airport in Brașov, Romania

Brașov-Ghimbav International Airport Aeroportul Internațional Brașov-Ghimbav
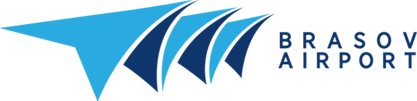

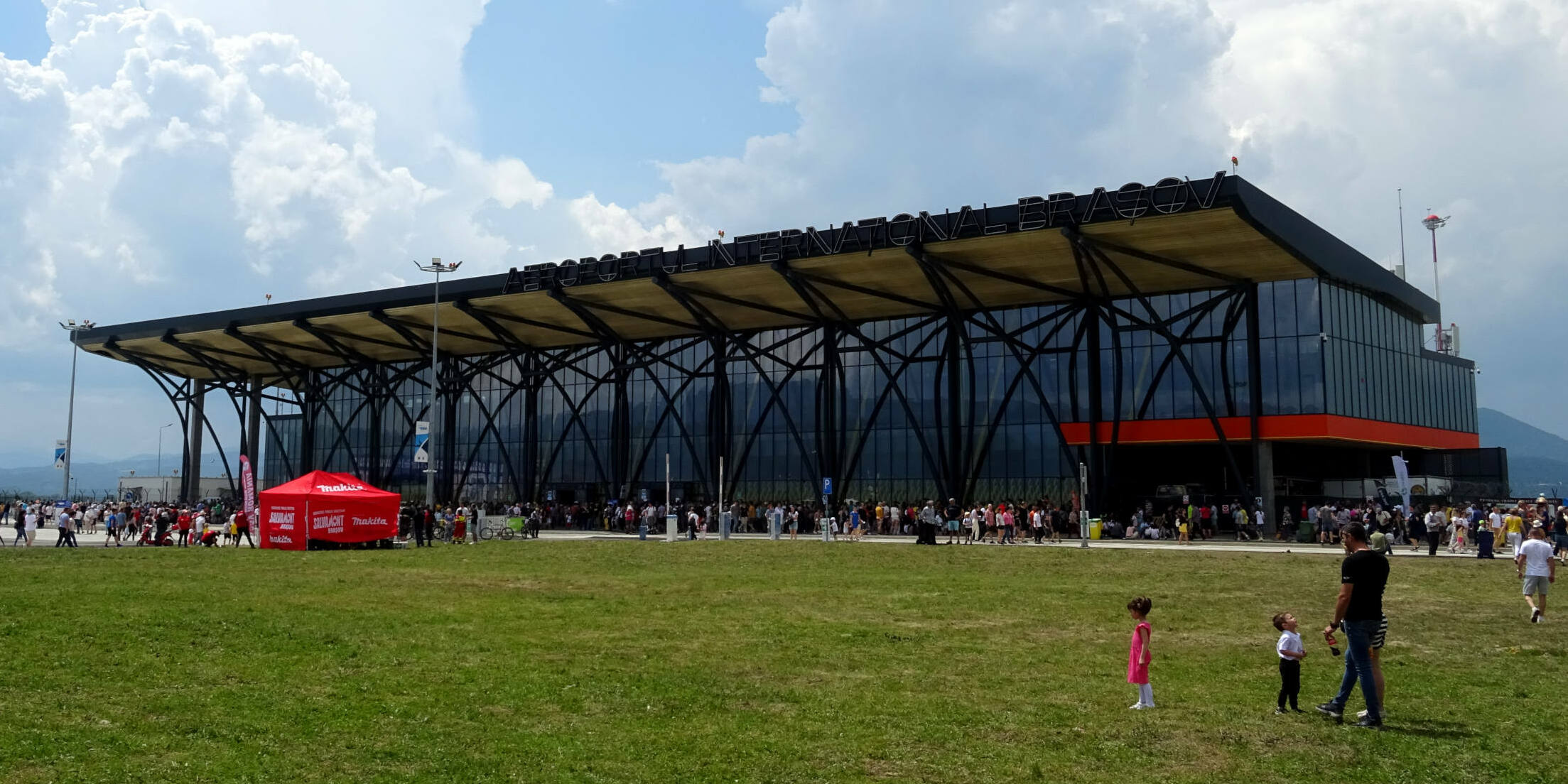
- IATA: GHV; ICAO: LRBV

Summary
- Airport type: Public
- Operator: Brașov County Council
- Serves: Brașov
- Location: Ghimbav, Brașov County
- Opened: 15 June 2023; 3 years ago
- Operating base for: Wizz Air (begins 17 December 2026)
- Elevation AMSL: 1,740 ft (530 m)
- Coordinates: 45°42′06″N 25°31′12″E
- Website: brasovairport.ro

Map
- Location within Romania

Runways
Direction	Length		Surface
Direction	m	ft	Surface
03/21	2,820	9,252	Concrete

Statistics (2025)
- Passengers: 337,353 ▲
- Aircraft movements: 3,496 ▲
- Source: AIP at the Romanian Airports Association (RAA)

Brașov-Ghimbav International Airport (Romanian: Aeroportul Internațional Brașov-Ghimbav, IATA: GHV, ICAO: LRBV) is an airport located in Ghimbav, near Brașov, Romania. It is the first airport to be built in Romania in the last 50 years, and the 17th commercial airport in the country. Flights commenced on 15 June 2023.

== History ==
=== Planning ===
The project has been widely supported by the local population and some businesses in the area have announced plans to switch to air freight services. It is expected that the airport will create 4,000 jobs and reach 1 million passengers in 8 years, with a further 6,000 jobs being generated indirectly. Planned costs of the project were originally estimated at €87 million.

In 2006, the Romanian State Domain Agency transferred 110 hectares of land to Brașov County. Intelcan Canada was to develop and build the airport in coordination with Brașov, Harghita, and Covasna counties as well as the Ghimbav city. The airport's charter was officially signed on 14 November 2005. Intelcan inaugurated the construction of the airport on 15 April 2008. The initial target for completion was twenty-four to thirty months. However, due to legal matters and a lack of funds, the construction works had stopped and Intelcan left the project, being replaced by the local authorities.

=== Construction ===
On 18 November 2012, the Brașov County authorities signed a €12.7 million (VAT excluded) contract with Vectra Service, a local construction company, for building the runway. Eventually, construction of the airport restarted in April 2013 with the works at the 2,820 m (9,252 ft) runway. On 3 October 2014, the runway was officially inaugurated.

The contract for the construction of the main terminal building, with a total area of 11,780 m^{2} (126,800 sq ft), was awarded to the Romanian contractor Bog'Art Bucharest and was signed on 21 August 2019. Construction works for the passenger terminal started on 17 March 2020 and were completed by March 2021. The construction works on the entire site were finally completed in May 2023, with the total costs raising to approximately €140 million.

Air traffic control is provided by a remote virtual tower operated from 400 km (250 mi) away, in Arad.

=== Opening ===
In the first year of operations, the airport is expected to service 300,000 passengers. It is expected that the traffic at the airport will reach one million passengers by 2026, and the construction of a second terminal, or more likely an extension of the already existing building, is envisioned for 2027–2033.

The airport opened on 15 June 2023. The first flight was a TAROM flight from Bucharest, operated by a Boeing 737-700 registered YR-BGG (TAROM's retrojet) which touched down at 08:10 in the morning. The first international flight was Dan Air flight 234 from Stuttgart, operated by an Airbus A320 registered YR-DSE.

=== Operations ===
Upon the airport starting operating, the Romanian authority for air traffic control only allowed flights on the site between 7:00 AM and 7:00 PM, due to the limited number of trained staff able to handle the work. Because of this situation, some carriers operating at the airport rerouted their flights that had been delayed outside these working hours to other airports, such as Bucharest or Sibiu. From January 2024, the airport has extended its operating schedule to 11:00 PM.

The then new Romanian airline Dan Air had been the most active carrier upon the airport's opening, with a large number of routes served, yet from November 2023, they decided to move all their flights to the Bacău airport, because of the tight operating schedule. In December 2024, Fly Lili announced the termination of all scheduled operations from Brașov by January 2025, citing insufficient business figures. The airline's withdrawal would negatively impact the airport, which would barely surpass the 200,000 passenger mark, and the terminal expansion projected for 2027-2029 was put on hold.

In 2025 and 2026, Wizz Air delivered a major boost for Brasov by adding ten new routes and increasing frequencies in an expansion that marks a decisive shift from their earlier focus on Sibiu, allocating an Airbus A321neo to the airport. The airline's substantial new investment in Brasov is expected to put the airport firmly back on a growth trajectory, restoring confidence in its long-term ambitions.

== Airlines and destinations ==
The following airlines operate flights at Brașov-Ghimbav International Airport:

Airlines	Destinations
Animawings	Seasonal: Heraklion; Seasonal charter: Antalya, Hurghada, Monastir
HiSky	Seasonal charter: Antalya, Heraklion, Hurghada
Sky Express	Seasonal charter: Heraklion
Tailwind Airlines	Seasonal charter: Antalya
Wizz Air	Barcelona (begins 18 December 2026), Budapest, Chișinău (begins 17 December 2026), Dortmund, Karlsruhe/Baden-Baden (begins 18 December 2026), Katowice, London–Luton, Madrid (begins 20 December 2026), Memmingen, Milan–Malpensa, Naples, Nuremberg, Rome–Fiumicino, Valencia (begins 3 November 2026), Warsaw–Chopin

== Statistics ==
Monthly traffic figures
Month	2023	YTD (2023)	2024	YTD (2024)	2025	YTD (2025)
January			8,249	8,249	20,877	20,877
February			9,544	17,793	16,165	37,042
March			10,092	27,885	19,855	56,897
April			9,369	37,254	18,368	75,265
May			11,170	48,424	20,849	96,114
June	4,358	4,358	19,382	67,806	32,057	128,171
July	9,913	14,271	27,014	94,820	34,390	162,561
August	16,486	30,757	34,038	128,858	36,354	198,915
September	17,907	48,664	30,121	158,979	31,887	230,802
October	13,253	61,917	25,071	184,050	31,794	262,596
November	9,819	71,736	21,566	205,616	36,301	298,897
December	7,790	79,526	22,284	227,900	38,456	337,353

== Ground transportation ==
Brașov-Ghimbav Airport is connected to Brașov city center and the main railway station via the A1 express bus line, operated by RATBV. The route runs from Brașov railway station to the airport, with scheduled departures synchronized with flight arrivals and departures. Buses operate daily at 30 to 60 minute intervals, with an average travel time of 20 to 25 minutes.

== See also ==
- Aviation in Romania
- Transport in Romania
- List of airports in Europe
