= Ghimbav =

- Town
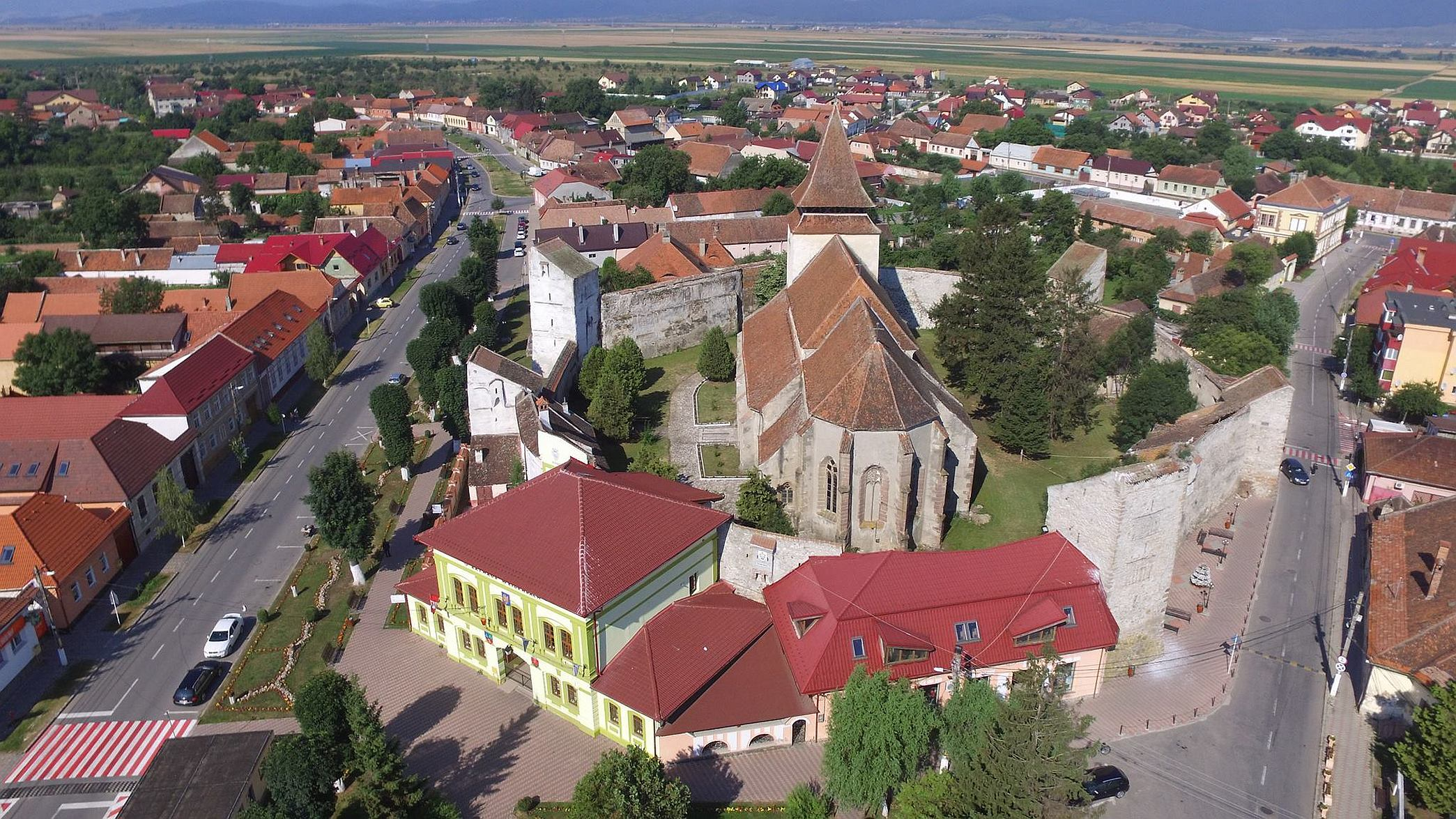
- Fortified church of Ghimbav

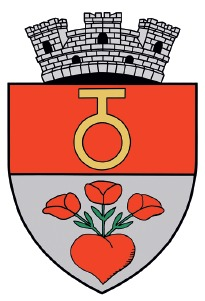
- Coat of arms

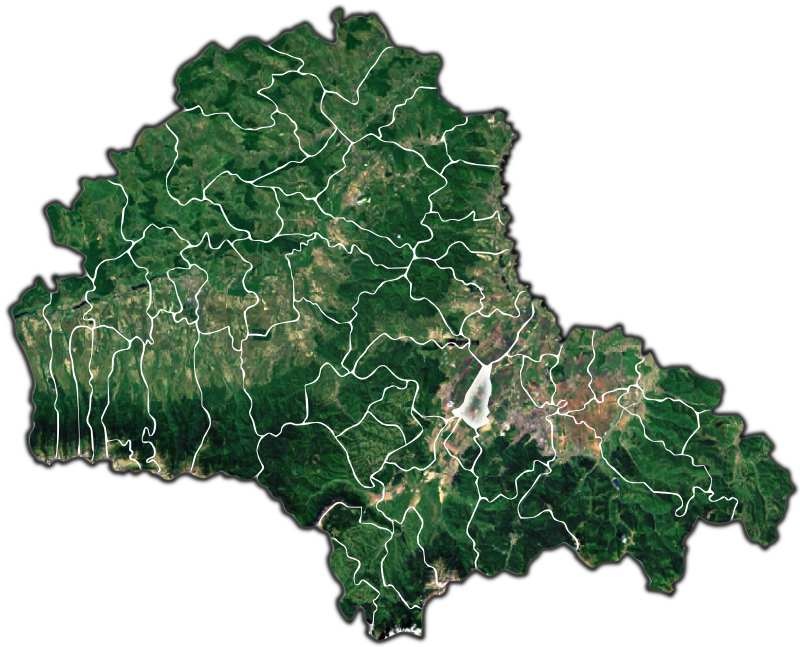
- Location in Brașov County

- Location in Romania
- Coordinates: 45°39′46″N 25°30′22″E
- Country: Romania
- County: Brașov

Government
  - Mayor (2024–2028): Ionel Fliundra (PNL)
- Area: 28.08 km^{2} (10.84 sq mi)
- Elevation: 559 m (1,834 ft)
- Population (2021-12-01): 7,208
  - Density: 256.7/km^{2} (664.8/sq mi)
- Time zone: UTC+02:00 (EET)
  - Summer (DST): UTC+03:00 (EEST)
- Postal code: 507075
- Area code: (+40) 02 68
- Vehicle reg.: BV
- Website: www.primaria-ghimbav.ro

Ghimbav (German: Weidenbach; Hungarian: Vidombák) is a town in Brașov County, Transylvania, central Romania.

== Geography ==
The town is situated in the southern part of the Transylvanian Plateau, at an altitude of 559 m (1,834 ft), on the banks of the river Ghimbășel. It is located in the Burzenland ethnographic area, in the central part of Brașov County, just 8 kilometres (5 mi) west of the county seat, Brașov.

== History ==
The town was first mentioned in a letter written in 1420 by King Sigismund of Hungary. He advised the inhabitants of Weidenbach/Ghimbav to join their forces together with the people living in three other neighboring Saxon villages (Petersberg/Sânpetru, Honigberg/Hărman and Brenndorf/Bod) and contribute to the construction of the stone fortress of Brașov.

The Ottomans invaded Ghimbav in 1422. In 1469 a major fire damaged the town. In 1611 the Hungarian prince Gabriel Báthory set fire to several villages in Burzenland (Țara Bârsei); Ghimbav was one of them.

The local church and the bell tower were built around 1300. In the 15th century a fortress was built around the church. It was hit by lightning in 1642 and suffered major damages. In 1666 the city hall was moved inside the fortress as well as several other houses. These houses were demolished in 1940. The defensive walls were partially ruined in the 20th century.

== Demographics ==
Historical population
Year	Pop.	±%
2002	5,112	—
2011	4,698	−8.1%
2021	7,208	+53.4%
Source: Census data

At the 2021 census, Ghimbav had a population of 7,208; of those, 84.56% were ethnic Romanians and 1.96% Hungarians.

== Industry ==
IAR, a Romanian builder of helicopters and small planes, is located in Ghimbav. Among other aircraft, it builds the Eurocopter/IAR Puma military transport helicopter.

Premium AEROTEC, a subsidiary of EADS, has also built a factory in Ghimbav.

== Transportation ==
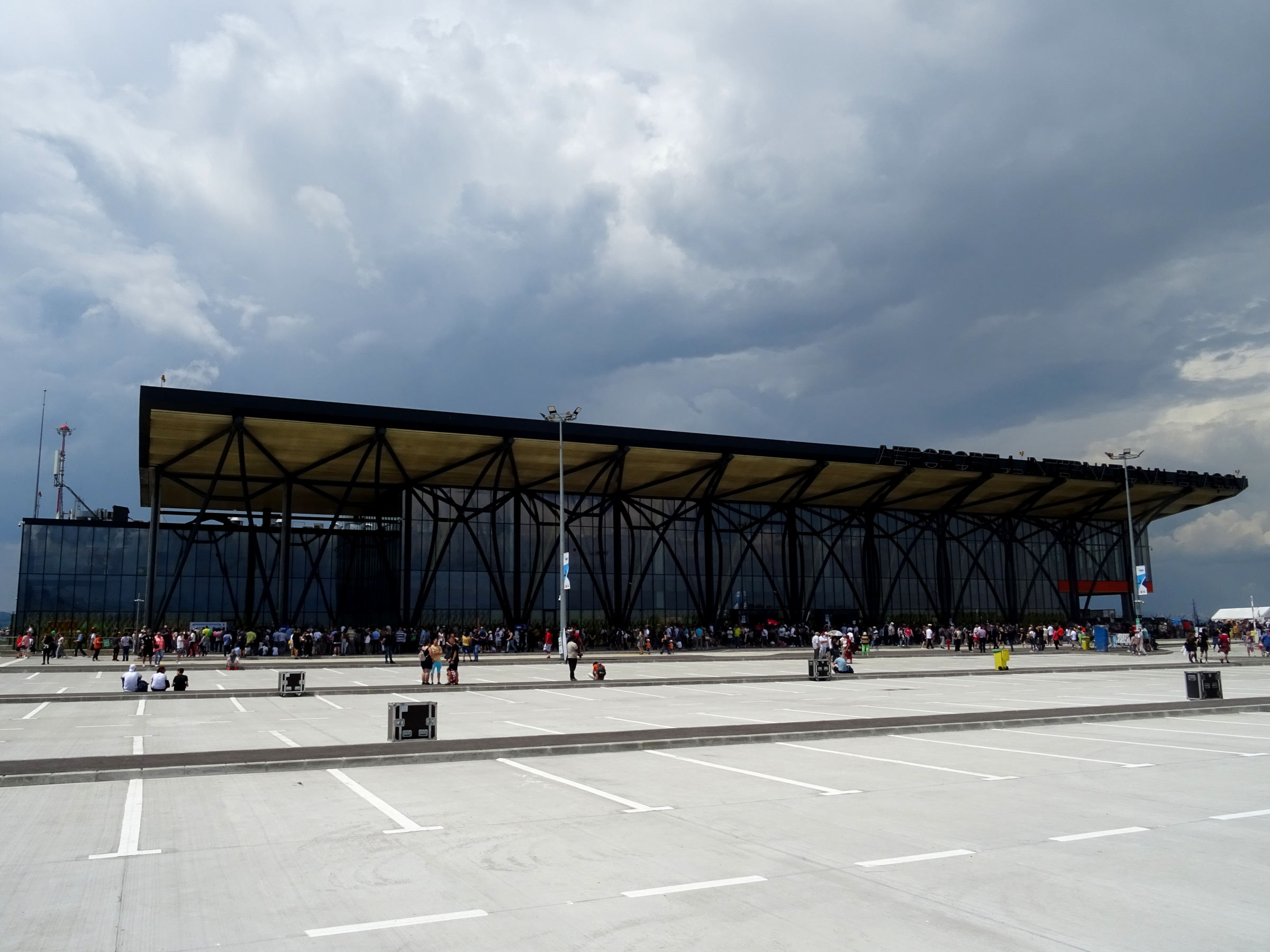
The Brașov-Ghimbav Airport

Ghimbav lies at the intersection of several major national roads:

- DN1 (on this section, part of European route E68), which links Bucharest with the northwestern part of the country and the Hungary–Romania border near Oradea.
- DN73, which connects Brașov to Pitești through the Rucăr–Bran Pass.
- DN73B, which connects Ghimbav to Cristian, 5 km (3.1 mi) to the south.

The Ghimbav train station serves the CFR Main Line 200, which connects Brașov to Timișoara and the border with Hungary at Curtici.

The Brașov-Ghimbav International Airport, opened on June 15, 2023, is located on the northern side of the town.

== Other ==
The 206th Artillery Battalion "General Mihail Lăcătușu" of the 2nd Mountain Troops Brigade is garrisoned in Ghimbav. The Henri Coandă Air Force Academy operates an airfield in Ghimbav.

== Climate ==
Ghimbav has a warm-summer humid continental climate (Dfb in the Köppen climate classification).

Climate data for Ghimbav
Month	Jan	Feb	Mar	Apr	May	Jun	Jul	Aug	Sep	Oct	Nov	Dec	Year
Mean daily maximum °C (°F)	0.7 (33.3)	2.8 (37.0)	7.6 (45.7)	13.7 (56.7)	18.5 (65.3)	21.7 (71.1)	23.6 (74.5)	24 (75)	18.9 (66.0)	13.6 (56.5)	8.4 (47.1)	2.3 (36.1)	13.0 (55.4)
Daily mean °C (°F)	−3.6 (25.5)	−1.9 (28.6)	2.7 (36.9)	8.5 (47.3)	13.6 (56.5)	17.2 (63.0)	19 (66)	19 (66)	14.1 (57.4)	8.6 (47.5)	3.9 (39.0)	−1.7 (28.9)	8.3 (46.9)
Mean daily minimum °C (°F)	−8 (18)	−6.4 (20.5)	−2.3 (27.9)	2.7 (36.9)	7.9 (46.2)	12 (54)	13.8 (56.8)	13.8 (56.8)	9.4 (48.9)	4.1 (39.4)	0.2 (32.4)	−5.3 (22.5)	3.5 (38.4)
Average precipitation mm (inches)	45 (1.8)	42 (1.7)	56 (2.2)	73 (2.9)	95 (3.7)	100 (3.9)	95 (3.7)	78 (3.1)	61 (2.4)	53 (2.1)	47 (1.9)	49 (1.9)	794 (31.3)
Source: https://en.climate-data.org/europe/romania/brasov/ghimbav-15426/
