= Satu Mare International Airport =

Satu Mare International Airport Aeroportul Internațional Satu Mare
- IATA: SUJ; ICAO: LRSM

Summary
- Airport type: Public
- Owner: Ministry of Transport and Infrastructure
- Operator: Consiliul Județean Satu Mare
- Serves: Satu Mare County
- Location: Satu Mare
- Opened: 1936
- Elevation AMSL: 414 ft (126 m)
- Coordinates: 47°42′12″N 022°53′08″E
- Website: Aeroportul Satu Mare website

Map
- Location of airport in Romania

Runways
Direction	Length		Surface
Direction	m	ft	Surface
01/19	2,500	8,202	Concrete

Statistics (2025)
- Passengers: 94,110 ▲
- Aircraft movements: 1,198 ▲
- Source: AIP at the Romanian Airports Association (RAA)

Satu Mare Airport (IATA: SUJ, ICAO: LRSM) is an international airport located in northwest Romania, 14 km (8.7 mi) south of Satu Mare municipality, the capital of Satu Mare County.

== History ==
Satu Mare Airport is one of the first airports in Romania, founded on 15 October 1936. In 1938, a Junkers 34 operating the Cluj – Satu Mare – Oradea – Cluj route became the first plane to arrive at the airfield. The current runway was inaugurated in 1975. In 1996, the facility was designated as an international airport. TAROM launched a direct flight to New York City in June 1998. The service originated in Bucharest and was operated by Airbus A310s.

== Airlines and destinations ==
The following airlines operate regular scheduled and charter flights at Satu Mare Airport:

Airlines	Destinations
TAROM	Bucharest–Otopeni
Wizz Air	London–Luton

== Statistics ==
Year	Passengers	Changes
2008	7,298	Steady
2009	11,101	▲52.1%
2010	18,859	▲69.9%
2011	23,469	▲24.4%
2012	19,289	▼17.8%
2013	16,192	▼16.1%
2014	12,644	▼16.1%
2015	17,212	▲36.1%
2016	23,796	▲38.3%
2017	60,795	▲155.8%
2018	75,692	▲24.5%
2019	84,172	▲11.2%
2020	25,547	▼69.6%
2021	47,280	▲85.5%
2022	60,568	▲28.1%
2023	56,396	▼6.9%
2024	70,206	▲24.5%
2025	94,110	▲34.0%

== See also ==
- Aviation in Romania
- List of the busiest airports in Romania
- Transport in Romania
