= Maramureș Airport =

Airport in Tăuții-Măgherăuș, Romania

Maramureș International Airport Aeroportul Internațional Maramureș
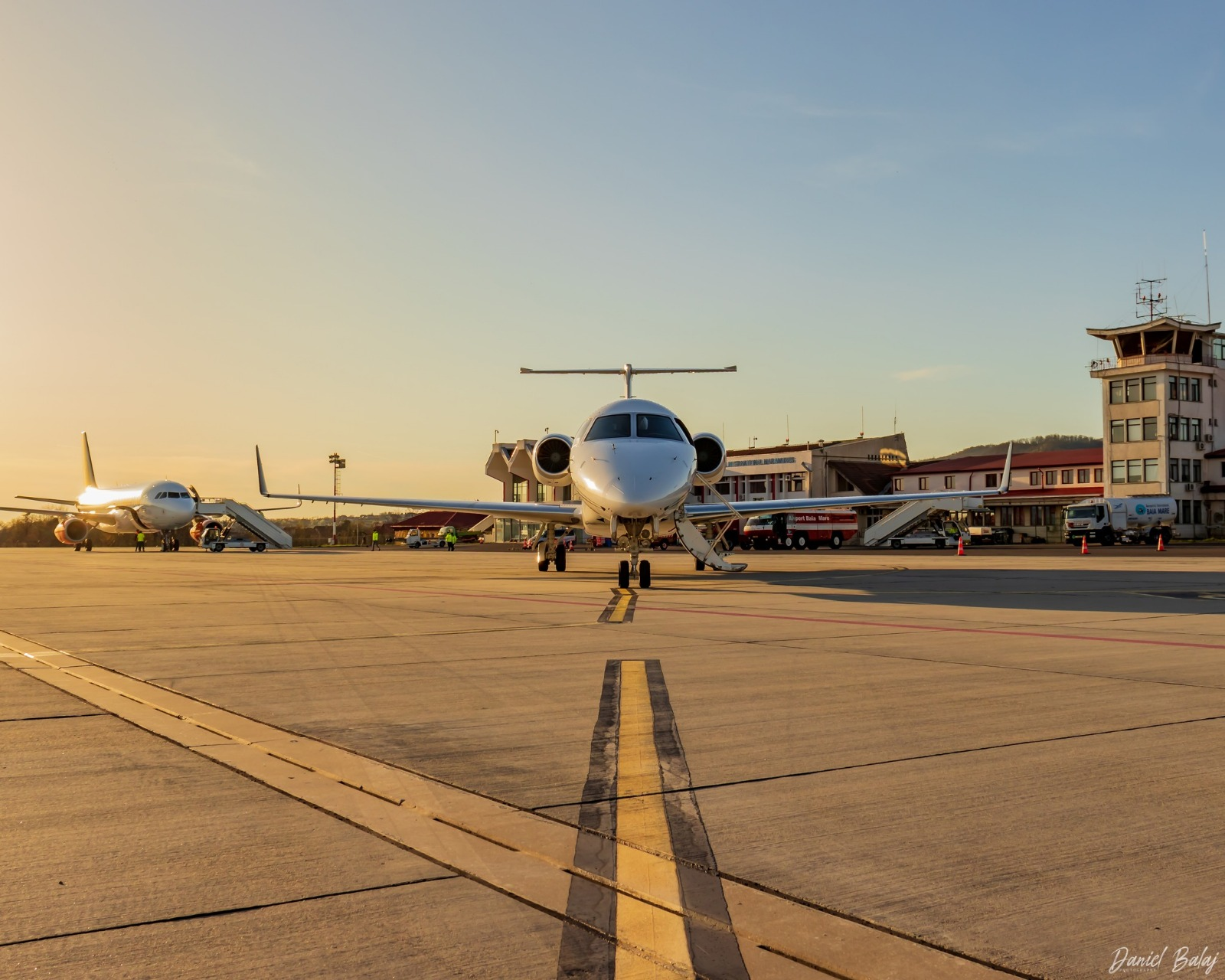
- IATA: BAY; ICAO: LRBM

Summary
- Airport type: Public
- Operator: Maramureș County Council
- Serves: Baia Mare, Romania
- Location: Tăuții-Măgherăuș
- Opened: 1951
- Elevation AMSL: 605 ft (184 m)
- Coordinates: 47°39′30″N 23°27′59″E
- Website: www.aimm.eu

Map
- Location of airport in Romania

Runways
Direction	Length		Surface
Direction	m	ft	Surface
09/27	2,150	7,054	Asphalt

Statistics (2025)
- Passengers: 94,226 ▲
- Aircraft movements: 1,223 ▲
- Source: AIP at the Romanian Airports Association (RAA)

Maramureș International Airport (IATA: BAY, ICAO: LRBM) is a minor international airport in northwest Romania, located in Tăuții-Măgherăuș, 10 km (6.2 mi) west of Baia Mare municipality and in the historic region of Maramureș.

On 28 June 2026, Maramureș International Airport inaugurated its new passenger terminal. Spanning over 12,000 square meters across two floors, the facility was the result of an approximately €65 million investment by the Maramureș County Council, carried out between August 2023 and June 2026.

== Airlines and destinations ==
The following airlines operate regular scheduled and charter flights at Maramureș Airport:

Airlines	Destinations
HiSky	Beauvais
TAROM	Bucharest–Otopeni

== Statistics ==
Annual revenue passenger and aircraft movements
Year	Passengers (% change from prior year)	Movements (% change from prior year)
2001	6,940	706
2002	4,285(-38.5%)	482(-31.7%)
2003	6,362(+48.5%)	712(+47.7%)
2004	4,471(-29.7%)	504(-29.2%)
2005	7,657(+71.2%)	747(+48.2%)
2006	4,917(-35.8%)	395(-47.1%)
2007	13,370(+171.9%)	732(+85.3%)
2008	22,546(+68.6%)	1,092(+49.2%)
2009	25,101(+11.3%)	1,310(+19,9%)
2010	19,229(-23.4%)	834(-36.3%)
2011	24,462(+16.8%)	822(-1.4%)
2012	17,571(-21.8%)	1,256(+52.8%)
2013	16,862(-4.0%)	996(-20.7%)
2014	21,608(+28.1%)	1,126(+13.0%)
2015	19,228(-11.0%)	1,304(+15.8%)
2016	44(-99.8%*)	12(-99.1%*)
2017	44(0.0%*)	36(+200.0%*)
2018	2,621(+5,686.8%*)	134(+272.2%*)
2019	40,925(+1,461.4%)	913(+581.3%)
2020	17,344(-57.6%**)	519(-43.1%**)
2021	44,266(+155.2%)	833(+60.5%)

Note - From January 2016 until July 2018 the airport was under upgrade works.

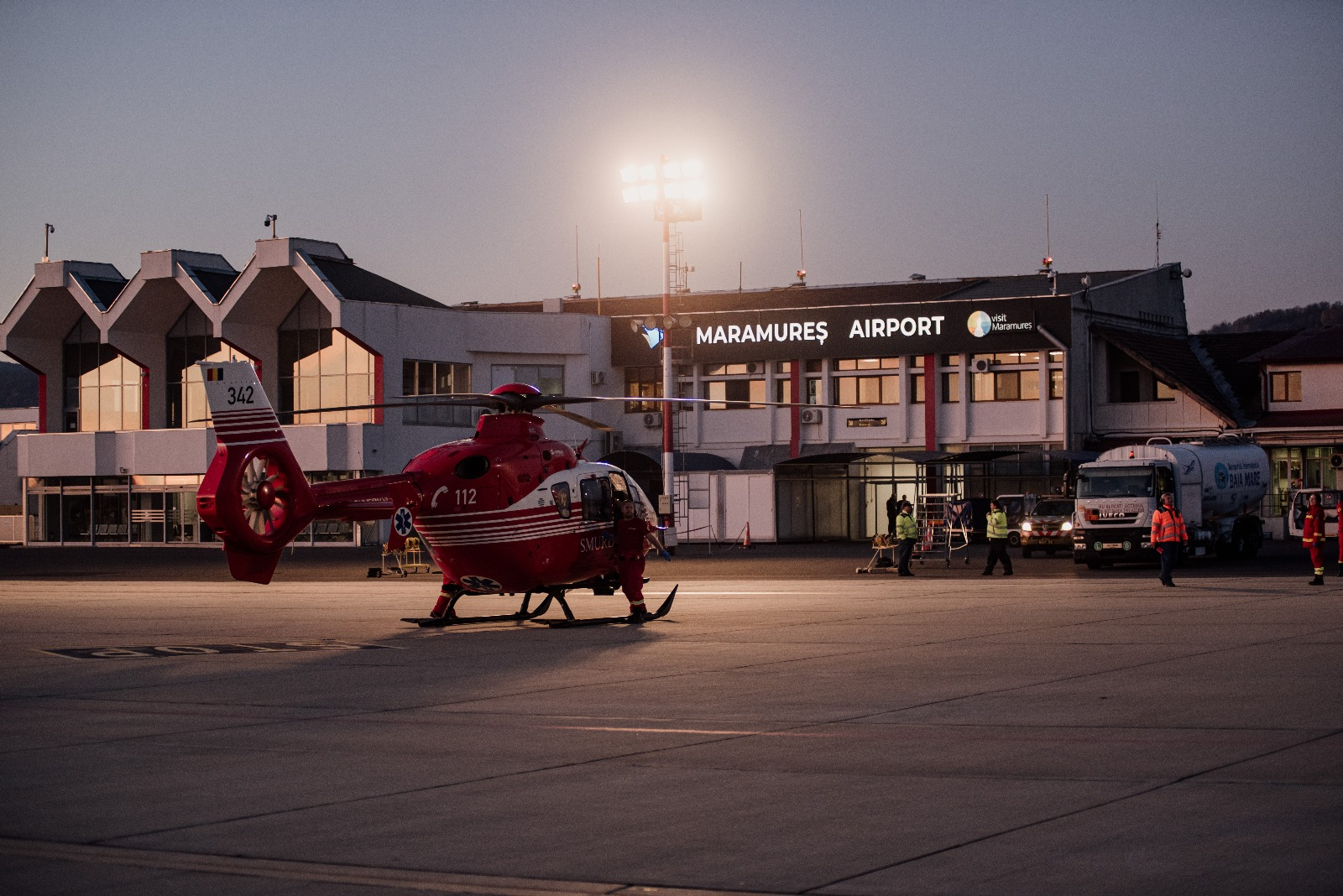
Apron, Aeroportul International Maramures

== See also ==
- Aviation in Romania
- Transport in Romania

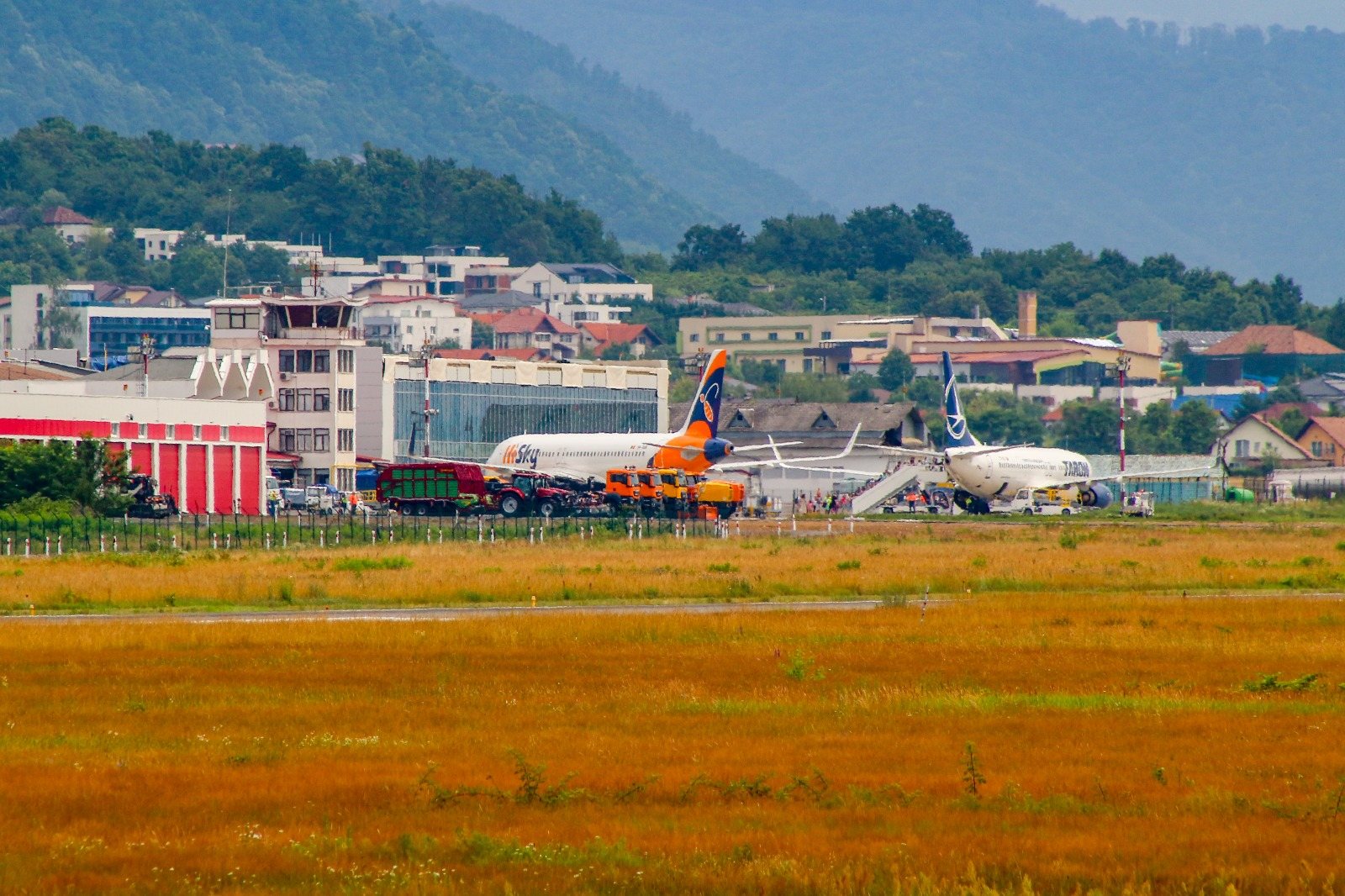
Apron, Aeroportul International Maramures
