= Tulcea Airport =

Tulcea Danube Delta Airport Aeroportul Delta Dunării Tulcea
- IATA: TCE; ICAO: LRTC

Summary
- Airport type: Public
- Operator: Consiliul Județean Tulcea
- Serves: Tulcea
- Location: Tulcea, Danube Delta, Romania
- Opened: 1952
- Elevation AMSL: 200 ft (61 m)
- Coordinates: 45°03′46″N 28°42′52″E

Map
- Location within Romania

Runways
Direction	Length		Surface
Direction	m	ft	Surface
16/34	2,120	6,758	Concrete

Statistics (2013)
- Passengers: 1,887
- Aircraft movements: 996
- Source: Romanian AIP at EUROCONTROL, Statistics

Tulcea Danube Delta Airport (IATA: TCE, ICAO: LRTC) (also known as Cataloi Airport) is located in south-eastern Romania, 16 km (9.9 mi) south of the city of Tulcea, on the Danube bank and close to the Danube Delta. It is Northern Dobruja's second airport after Mihail Kogălniceanu International Airport, which serves Constanța.

Image of LRTC Airport - Delta Dunarii - Tulcea - Romania - Europe - 2025

== History ==
Romanian flag carrier TAROM flew between its hub Henri Coanda International Airport and Tulcea until June 2008 but the route was cancelled due to poor ticket sales. Since Fly Romania's departure in August 2014, there have been no scheduled flights to and from the airport. This was said to change in June 2023, when HiSky was meant to start full charter services from Tulcea to Antalya and therefore mark the resumption of scheduled flights. However, there were no such flights in the summer of 2023.

On 24 April 2024, a new terminal building with an area of 8,600 m^{2} (92,570 sq ft) was inaugurated.

== Airlines and destinations ==
There are no regular commercial passenger flights to/from Tulcea.

== See also ==
- Aviation in Romania
- Transport in Romania
