= Craiova International Airport =

Craiova International Airport Aeroportul Internaţional Craiova
- IATA: CRA; ICAO: LRCV

Summary
- Airport type: Public
- Operator: Consiliul Judeţean Dolj
- Serves: Craiova, Romania
- Opened: 1938
- Focus city for: Wizz Air
- Elevation AMSL: 626 ft (191 m)
- Coordinates: 44°19′05″N 023°53′19″E
- Website: www.aeroportcraiova.ro

Map
- Location of airport in Romania

Runways
Direction	Length		Surface
Direction	m	ft	Surface
09/27	2,500	8,203	Asphalt

Statistics (2025)
- Passengers: 578,701 ▲
- Aircraft movements: 7,320 ▲
- Source: AIP at the Romanian Airports Association (RAA)

Craiova International Airport (IATA: CRA, ICAO: LRCV) is located in the south-western part of Romania, 7 km (4.3 mi) east of Craiova municipality, one of Romania's largest cities. The airport area is the headquarters of Avioane Craiova (formerly known as IRAv Craiova), the company which built the Romanian IAR-93 and IAR-99 aircraft.

== History ==
The airport was established in 1938 following a decree issued by King Carol II. Through the decree, the airport was meant to be used both as a public airport and a military one in case of war. The airport had a dirt runway with dimensions of 1000×200 m. Between 1950 and 1952, a 2,000 m (6,600 ft) concrete runway, as well as the first airport facilities were constructed. On 6 May 1957, Li-2 aircraft began flying on the Craiova - Bucharest route. The control tower was built in 1959, and between 1959 and 1972 the runway was extended to 2,500 m (8,200 ft). Between 1972 and 1989, other airport facilities were built.

From 1995, the airport was opened to domestic and international traffic, serving only charter flights. A new terminal was opened at Craiova airport in December 2010. Runway renovation works took place in summer 2015. Since July 2014, Craiova Airport is the base for Wizz Air which serves 14 destinations in 7 countries. In March 2018, Ryanair announced it would terminate all services at Craiova by October 2018 which had operated since November 2016 and consisted of a single route to Valencia.

== Airlines and destinations ==
The following airlines operate regular scheduled and charter flights at Craiova Airport:

Airlines	Destinations
AlbaStar	Seasonal charter: Palma de Mallorca
Nesma Airlines	Seasonal charter: Hurghada
Animawings	Istanbul; Seasonal: Heraklion; Seasonal charter: Antalya; Monastir; Hurghada
Cyprus Airways	Seasonal charter: Larnaca
HiSky	Seasonal charter: Heraklion; Antalya
Nouvelair	Seasonal charter: Monastir
Sky Express	Seasonal charter: Heraklion
SkyUp MT	Seasonal charter: Heraklion
Wizz Air	Athens, Barcelona , Bari, Beauvais, Bergamo, Birmingham, Bologna, Charleroi, Dortmund, London–Luton, Madrid, Memmingen, Naples, Rome–Fiumicino, Venice

== Statistics ==
=== Passengers ===
Year	Passengers	Change	Aircraft movements	Change
2007	5,133	Steady	Steady	Steady
2008	12,988	153% ▲	Steady	Steady
2009	15,130	16.4% ▲	Steady	Steady
2010	23,629	56.1% ▲	Steady	Steady
2011	32,006	35.4% ▲	Steady	Steady
2012	29,626	7.4% ▼	3,394	Steady
2013	40,291	35.9% ▲	2,246	33.9% ▼
2014	138,886	244.7% ▲	3,506	56.1% ▲
2015	116,947	15.8% ▼	2,999	14.5% ▼
2016	222,320	90.1% ▲	4,018	33.9% ▲
2017	447,227	101.1% ▲	5,960	48.3% ▲
2018	493,056	10.2% ▲	6,793	14% ▲
2019	514,544	4.3% ▲	6,779	0.2% ▼
2020	159,552	68.9% ▼	3,758	44.5% ▼
2021	191,510	20.0% ▲	5,260	39.6% ▲
2022	476,613	148.9% ▲	6,459	22.8% ▲
2023	597,990	25.5% ▲	7,604	17.7% ▲
2024	424,976	28.9% ▼	6,722	11.6% ▼
2025	578,701	36.2% ▲	7,320	8.9% ▲

=== Routes ===
Busiest routes from Craiova International Airport (2019)
Rank	Airport	Passengers
1	London - Luton	142,678
2	Bergamo	84,970
3	Rome - Ciampino Airport	43,856
4	Madrid	40,183
5	Bologna	35,368

== Military use ==
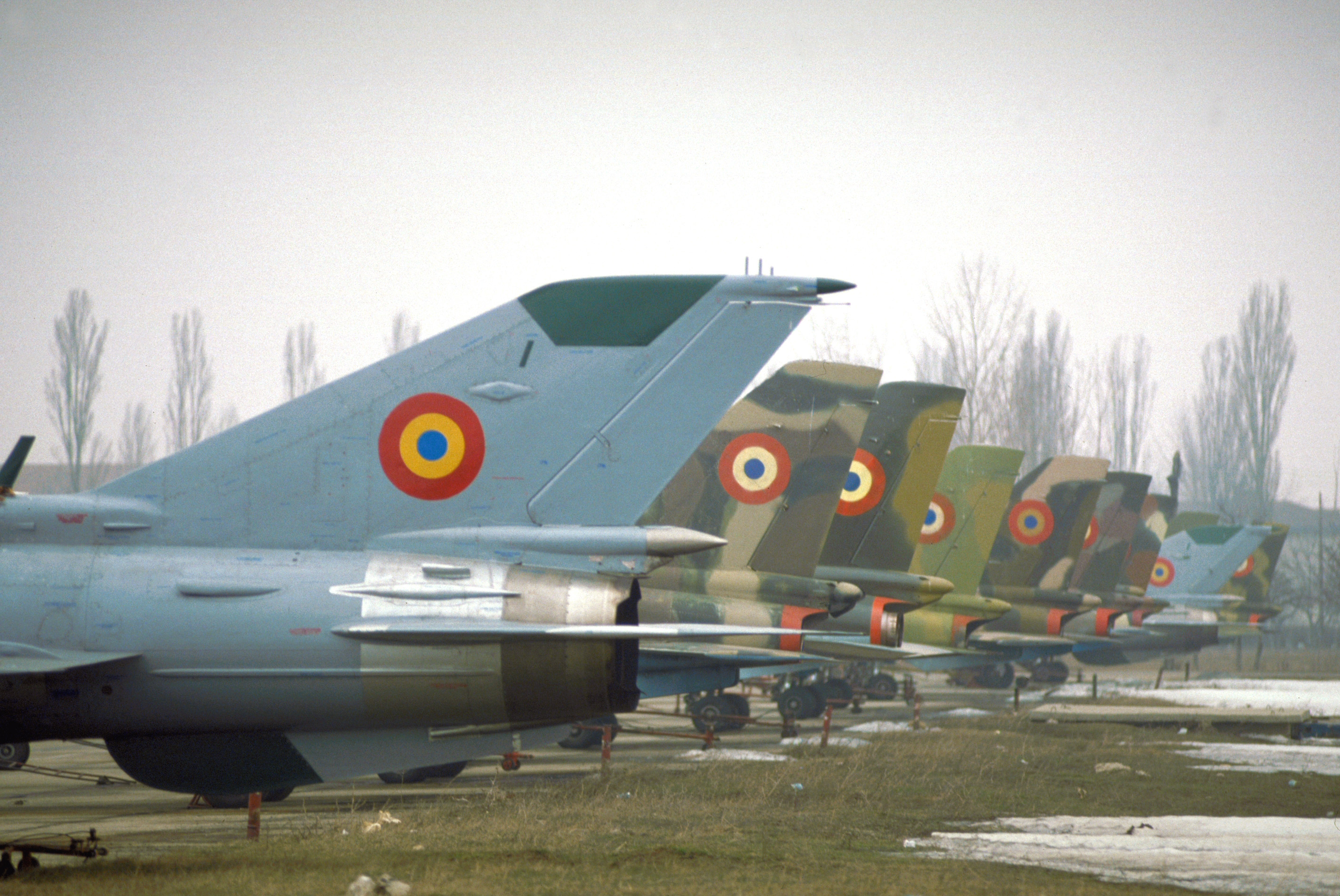
Retired MiG-21 and IAR-93 aircraft at the base in 1996

Between 1940 and 2004 the airport was used as a military air base. During the Cold War, the 67th Fighter Aviation Regiment was headquartered at Craiova. It was equipped with MiG-15 and MiG-17 fighters, as well as IAR 93 ground attack aircraft. From 1991, the MiG-15s and 17s were replaced with MiG-21s. The 322nd Aviation Maintenance Centre also functioned at the base between 1970 and 2004.

== Ground transportation ==
The airport is connected to the city via bus route 9 (Metro-Central Market-Craiovița Nouă) of the public transport company RAT Craiova. There is a station in front of the airport with all-day service time.

== See also ==
- Aviation in Romania
- Transport in Romania
