= Arad International Airport =

Airport in Romania

Arad International Airport Aeroportul Internațional Arad
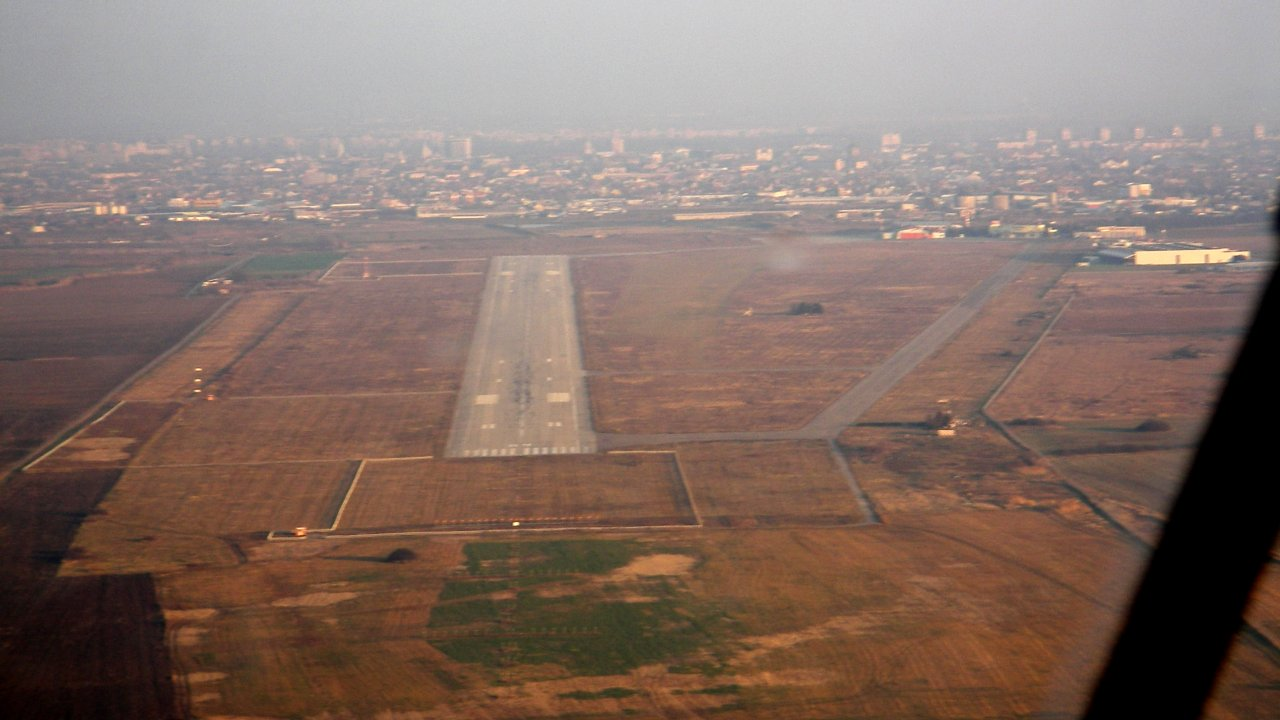
- IATA: ARW; ICAO: LRAR

Summary
- Airport type: Public
- Operator: Arad County Council
- Serves: Arad, Romania
- Opened: 14 November 1937
- Elevation AMSL: 352 ft / 107 m
- Coordinates: 46°10′36″N 21°15′43″E
- Website: aeroportularad.ro

Map
- Location within Romania

Runways
Direction	Length		Surface
Direction	m	ft	Surface
09/27	2,000	6,561	Concrete

Statistics (2019)
- Passengers: 8,925 ▲64.8%
- Aircraft movements: 750
- Source: AIP at the Romanian Airports Association (RAA)

Arad International Airport (IATA: ARW, ICAO: LRAR) is located 4 km (2.5 mi) west of Arad, in western Romania, in the historical region of Crișana. The airport is located only 60 km (37 mi) north of Timișoara Airport. Arad International Airport also has a cargo terminal, the largest and most modern in western Romania. It is located 250 km from Budapest and 300 km from Belgrade. It is located near the border with Hungary, only 30 km from the closest point for crossing the border - Turnu and 20 km away from the closest railway point for crossing the border - Curtici. The airport also serves as the SMURD regional air ambulance base for the five western counties that form the region (Arad, Bihor, Timis, Hunedoara and Caras-Severin). SMURD Arad operates 1 Eurocopter EC135 converted for the air ambulance role. Arad Airport is directly connected to the A1 motorway (part of the Pan-European Corridor IV), one of the most important and heavily used motorways in Romania.

== History ==
=== Early years ===
On the land of the Gai suburb there already was an infrastructure with a runway, hangar and a terminal, from the military campaign from 1917. Here, on 14 July 1912, a big meeting took place when Aurel Vlaicu, a pioneer in Romanian aviation, returned from Aspen Vienna and he was seen by his fellow citizens as a national hero.

As a result of some negotiations that took place in order to build a new airport, on 30 May 1935 the civil municipal aviation give the land from the Ceala suburb where the constructions will start for building the infrastructure. The construction work ended in 1936 and the official inauguration of the new airport took place on 14 November 1937. From that moment all the air traffic was conducted on this location and the landings and taking off happened on a grass runway. In 1953 a concrete runway, 2000 meters long, was built, as the increased traffic demanded it. The A and D taxiways were built at the same time as the runway. The lighting system was rebuilt in 1954 using Elba lamps.

The current runway is east–west, concrete, with dimensions of 2000 × 45 m, and is endowed with a state-of-the-art IDMAN lighting system consisting of marginal and axial light, threshold lights, approach lightings on both directions of operation and a Category II instrument landing system.

=== Future Development ===
A runway extension to 2500 m (8202 ft) has been proposed for the past couple of years, however no viable financial solution has been found. The extension would allow heavier cargo aircraft to operate, making better use of the cargo terminal's capabilities.

Recent projects have taken into consideration the conversion of an unused part of the cargo terminal into a passenger departures terminal to attract more airlines to the airport. A passenger terminal extension or overhaul is deemed absolutely necessary for the development of the airport.

In June 2014, a contract was signed for the extension and re-design of the passenger terminal, including the conversion of unused space in the cargo terminal in a designated departures terminal. Once completed, the extension will bring more than 4,200 square meters of space for departures use and allow an additional increase in passenger flow of over 200,000 passengers/year. The existing passenger terminal will be used only for arrivals, while the new space will be transformed in a departures terminal. The cargo terminal will thus be reduced to 700 square meters of space, but the operator declared there still is sufficient space in the surrounding areas for future growth. Construction works are estimated to last 12 months.

== Facilities ==
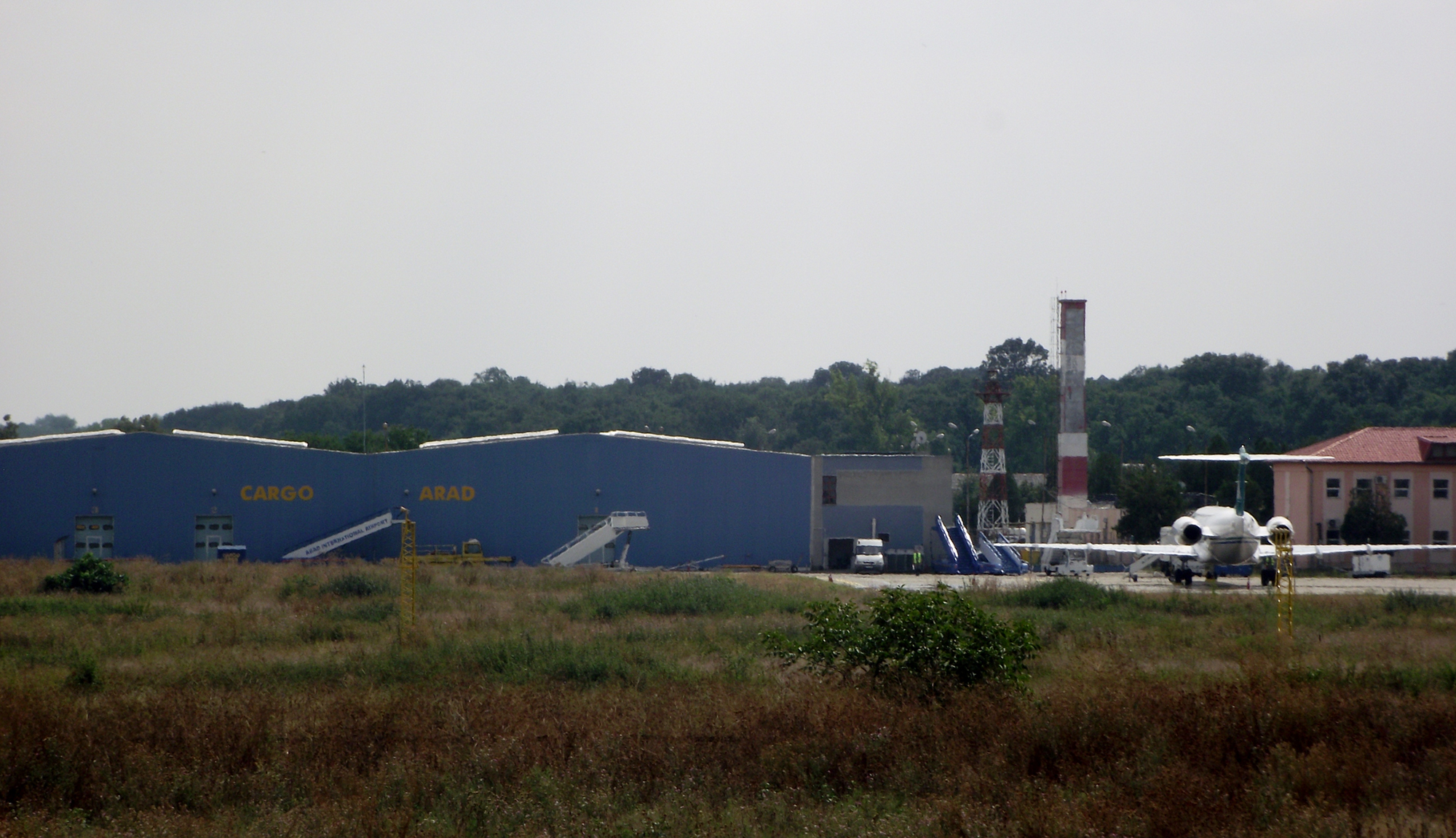
The Arad International Airport Cargo Terminal and platform seen from the A1 motorway.

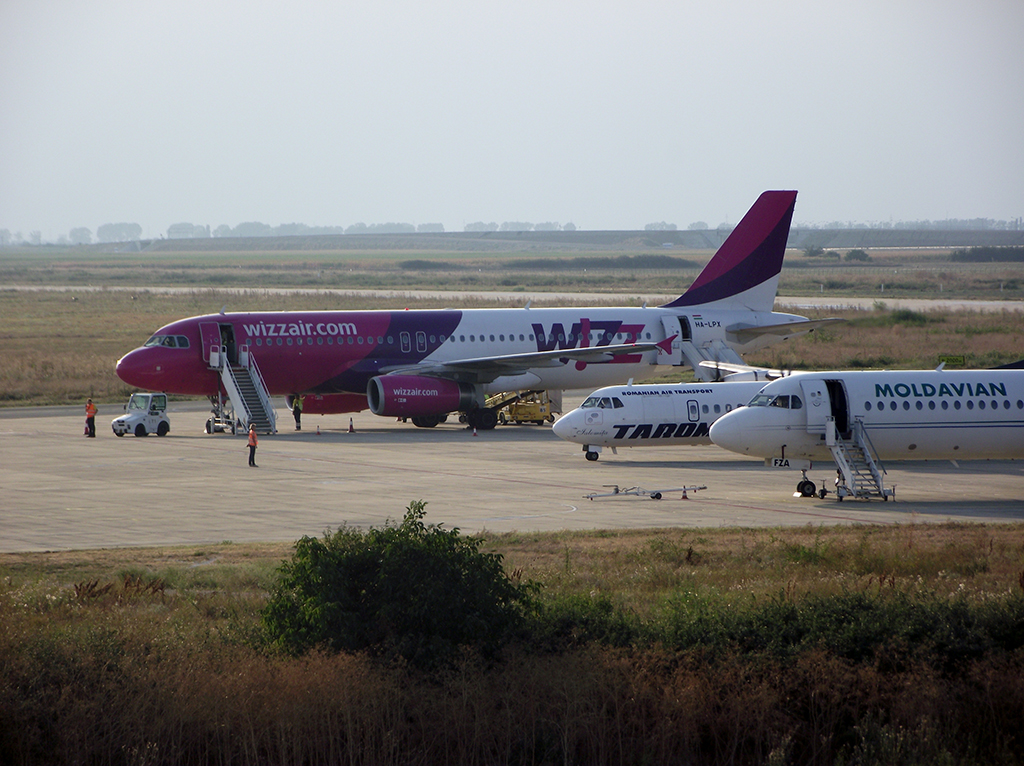
Arad Airport platform on a busy day, back in 2013: a Wizz Air Airbus A320, a TAROM ATR 72 and a Moldavian Fokker 100

=== Cargo Terminal ===
The Arad Airport Cargo Terminal, the largest of its kind in western Romania, is a major component of the Arad International Airport and is located nearby the Arad Free Zone, being able to take the air freight traffic that connects Western Europe to the Middle East. It is located close to the Hungarian border.

Its location permits easy access for the companies operating in the counties near Arad (Bihor, Alba, Hunedoara – Romania and Békés, Csongrád – Hungary) for transporting cargo.

This objective can take over the air freight traffic, with all the facilities on the air-road transport, by making use of the operating - parking Cargo type platforms, the covered area for depositing the cargo that permits also the customs checking, the parking platform for the airplanes, and it provides the specific units for both the air and land transporters. The apron is 16020sqm, 41/R/C/W/T and offers the possibility of parking 3 class "C" and "D" ICAO airplanes at the same time. The terminal has a total surface of 5000 sqm, 13 access gates to the auto loading/unloading ramp and 4 access gates to the airplane loading/unloading ramp. Its capacity for depositing (arrival, departure) is 300 to/day and the traffic capacity (arrival, departure) is 50 to/hour. The parking area of a surface of 8430 sqm can offer parking spaces for 32 cars and 5 cargo trucks, having also 2 oil separators.

== Airlines and destinations ==
The following airlines operate regular scheduled and charter flights at Arad Airport:

Airlines	Destinations
Corendon Airlines	Seasonal charter: Antalya

== Statistics ==
ARW traffic
Year	Passengers (total)	Change	Aircraft movements	Change	Cargo (tonnes)	Change
2008	128,835		3,383		537	
2009	88,174	▼31.6%	2,832	▼16.3%	673	▲25.3%
2010	21,878	▼75.2%	1,937	▼31.7%	754	▲12%
2011	11,174	▼49%	1,417	▼26.9%	883	▲17.1%
2012	14,844	▲32.8%	2,276	▲60.6%	772	▼12.6%
2013	39,901	▲168.8%	2,442	▲7.2%	1,004	▲30%
2014	28,280	▼29.2%	2,568	▲5.1%	1,079	▲7.4%
2015	8,530	▼69.8%				
2016	0	▼				
2017	10,817	▲				
2018	11,367	▲5.1%				
2019	18,739	▲64.8%				
2020	1,706	▼90.9%				
2021	11,671	▲584.1%				
2022	16,633	▲42.5%	3,993		60.3	

== See also ==
- Aviation in Romania
- Transport in Romania
