= Iași International Airport =

Iași International Airport Aeroportul Internațional Iași

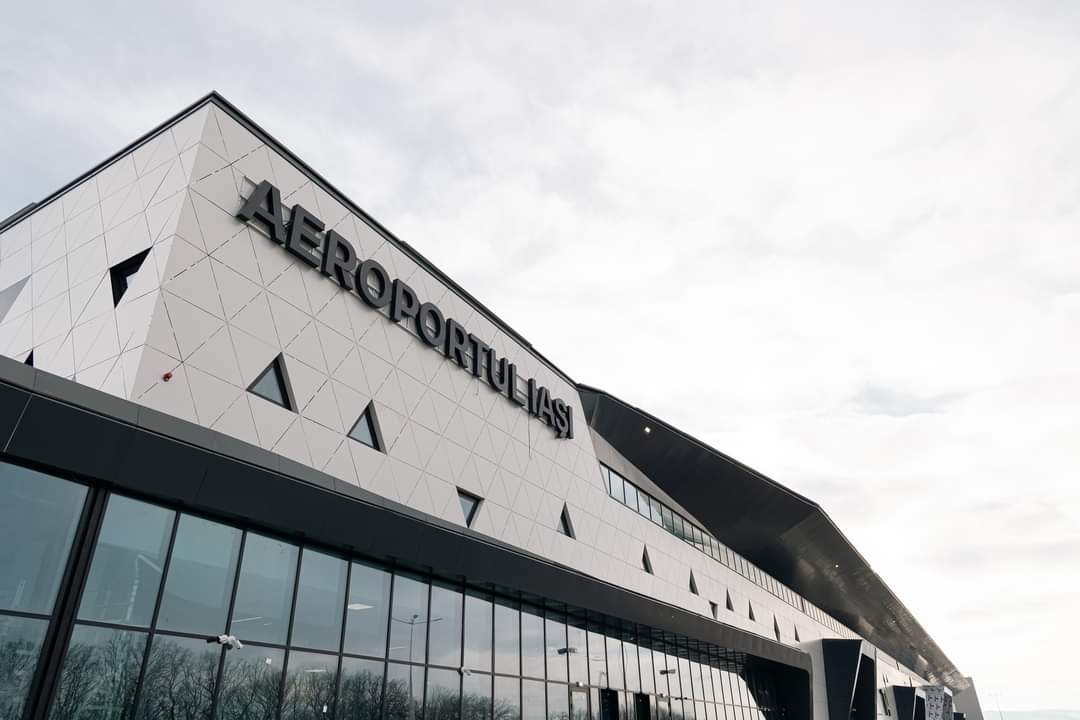
- IATA: IAS; ICAO: LRIA

Summary
- Airport type: Public
- Operator: Iași County Council
- Serves: Iași
- Location: Iași, Romania
- Opened: 1926
- Focus city for: Wizz Air
- Elevation AMSL: 411 ft (125 m)
- Coordinates: 47°10′44″N 027°37′12″E
- Website: aeroport-iasi.ro

Map
- Location of airport in Romania

Runways
Direction	Length		Surface
Direction	m	ft	Surface
14/32	2,400	7,874	Asphalt

Statistics (2025)
- Passengers: 2,244,156 ▲
- Aircraft movements: 17,095
- Source: AIP at the Romanian Airports Association (RAA)

Iași International Airport (IATA: IAS, ICAO: LRIA) is an international airport located in Iași, Romania, 8 km (5 mi) east of the city centre. One of the oldest accredited airports in Romania and the most important in the historical region of Moldavia, Iași Airport is the third-busiest airport in Romania in terms of passenger traffic.

== History ==
The Iași region earned its commercial representative status on 24 June 1926, when scheduled flights commenced on the route Bucharest – Galați – Iași – Chișinău. The flights were operated by Compagnie Franco-Roumaine de Navigation Aérienne - CFRNA, in 1930 renamed LARES (which became TARS in 1945, and TAROM in 1954).

In 1966, a north–south concrete runway, 15/33, with a total length of 1,800 m (5,906 ft), and a modern lighting system, were built, followed three years later by the construction of a passenger terminal. In 2001, the passenger terminal was upgraded to use separate flows for domestic and international flights.

In June 2012, a new passenger terminal, named T2, was added, increasing the total processing capacity to 215 pax/hour. The terminal was designated to be used for domestic flights. The old terminal was renamed T1.

In 2013, Iași International Airport started a long-term, multi-stage upgrade program. Module I of the project (an estimated €57 million investment) was completed in November 2015, and involved the construction of a new runway, a terminal building, and the extension of the apron. On 20 August 2014, the first 1,800 m (5,906 ft) of the new runway 14/32 went into operation, whilst the entire length of 2,400 m (7,874 ft) became fully operational on 16 October 2014. The old runway 15/33 was converted into a taxiway. On 17 October 2015, the third terminal building (T3) with a processing capacity of 320 pax/hour and two boarding gates, was inaugurated. A project which included the expansion of T2 (that would double the terminal's area) was also proposed, in October 2015.

On 13 November 2017, Iași Airport exceeded the 1,000,000 passenger mark.

In March 2021, an extension of the apron was completed and a new taxiway was inaugurated.

The airport experienced a surge in traffic in February 2022, as Moldova closed its airspace following the Russian Invasion of Ukraine. Due to the airport's proximity to the Romanian-Moldovan border, some airlines decided to reroute their flights from Chișinău Airport to Iași Airport, while other airlines announced plans to increase the number of destinations served from Iași.

On 9 May 2022, a contract of over €66 million was signed with Strabag for the design and execution of the T4 passenger terminal and the extension of the parking lot. Opened on 29 March 2024, T4 has an area of 31,210 m^{2} (335,942 sq ft), a processing capacity of 950 pax/hour, and seven gates (three jetways and four ground-level gates).

For the long term, the development project proposes other modules for the construction of a new apron, two rapid-exit taxiways, a cargo terminal, an aircraft fuel depot, a new access roadway, as well as of a 600-metre (2,000 ft) extension for the runway to a total length of 3,000 m (9,843 ft).

== Facilities ==
=== Terminal ===
The airport facilities consist of four terminals. Passenger operations take place in the main terminal T4, used for all domestic and Schengen flights, and T3, used for non-Schengen flights. The old terminal T1 functions as office/administrative and storage space, while there are plans for the former domestic terminal T2 to be converted into a cargo terminal.

=== Runway ===
Iași Airport sits at an elevation of 411 feet (125 m). There is one runway at the airport, aligned in the north–south direction.

Number	Length	Width	ILS	Notes
14/32	2,400 metres (7,874 ft)	45 metres (148 ft)	Cat. I (14)	Equipped at both ends with Approach Lighting Systems (ALSF II).

=== Other facilities ===
On the airport grounds, Aerostar provides aircraft maintenance services at its center opened in September 2020. In 2022, Heli Avia Service concessioned an area of 1.54 ha (4 acres) for the construction of a new hangar for helicopter maintenance.

== Airlines and destinations ==
The following airlines operate regular scheduled and charter flights at Iași Airport:

Airlines	Destinations
AJet	Istanbul–Sabiha Gökçen
Animawings	Bucharest–Otopeni; Seasonal: Heraklion, Thessaloniki
Austrian Airlines	Vienna
flydubai	Dubai–International, (begins 30 March 2027)
HiSky	Dublin, Hurghada
Ryanair	Brussels Charleroi, Dublin, Milan Bergamo, Paris Beauvais
Sky Express	Seasonal charter: Heraklion, Rhodes
SkyUp Airlines	Seasonal charter: Hurghada, Sharm El Sheikh
TAROM	Bucharest–Otopeni
Wizz Air	Barcelona, Basel/Mulhouse, Paris Beauvais, Billund, Bologna, Brussels Charleroi, Dortmund, Eindhoven, Istanbul, Larnaca, Liverpool, London–Luton, Maastricht, Madrid, Memmingen, Milan Bergamo, Pisa, Prague, Rome–Fiumicino, Suceava, Tel Aviv, Venice Treviso, Turin, Valencia

== Statistics ==
Annual passenger and aircraft statistics
Year	Passengers^{A} (% change from previous year)	Aircraft movements^{B}
2000	5,302(+?%)	499
2001	7,811(+47.3%)	510
2002	9,858(+26.2%)	880
2003	25,106(+154.7%)	1,291
2004	27,574(+9.8%)	1,405
2005	41,960(+52%)	1,796
2006	70,592(+68.2%)	2,377
2007	126,334(+79%)	3,442
2008	144,043(+14%)	3,860
2009	148,538(+3.1%)	4,961
2010	159,615(+7.5%)	4,755
2011	184,311(+15.4%)	–
2012	173,248(-6%)	4,800
2013	231,731(+33.8%)	4,723
2014	273,047(+17.7%)	4,851
2015	381,709(+39.5%)	6,088
2016	881,157(+131.2%)	10,269
2017	1,146,218(+30.1%)	11,752
2018	1,256,640(+9.6%)	12,749
2019	1,314,244(+4.6%)	12,493
2020	468,125(-64.4%)	–
2021	639,532(+36.6%)	–
2022	1,538,585(+140.6%)	12,652
2023	2,338,377(+52%)	15,435
2024	2,196,793(-6%)	–
2025	2,244,156(+2.2%)	17,095

Notes: A.Passengers data sources:
B.Aircraft movements data sources:

Month	Passengers						Change	Passengers cumulatively (YTD)	Change
Month	2017	2018	2019	2020	2021	2022	Change	Passengers cumulatively (YTD)	Change
January	76,781	83,323	95,452	93,224	19,180	53,756	▲180.3%	53,756	▲180.3%
February	73,783	74,070	90,687	85,025	12,457	44,901	▲260.4%	98,657	▲211.8%
March	82,009	81,707	95,003	39,528	14,063	119,387	▲748.9%	218,044	▲377.1%
April	87,850	92,522	102,211	6,631	23,868	139,187	▲483.2%	357,231	▲413.5%
May	89,796	95,304	111,247	5,103	34,308	159,813	▲365.8%	517,044	▲397.7%
June	101,615	100,930	122,409	9,576	53,726	173,719	▲223.3%	690,763	▲338.3%
July	118,362	131,917	132,721	48,600	89,292	177,642	▲98.9%	868.405	▲257.17%
August	125,605	142,839	134,975	61,128	116,390	181,400	▲55.9%	1,049,805	
September	114,954	132,800	124,593		96,444				
October	107,114	124,040	112,718		69,165				
November	85,354	102,035							
December	83,318	95,070							

Note: C.Data statistics: 2014, 2015

== Ground transportation ==
=== Bus ===
CTP, the public transit operator in Iași, provides non-stop service on route 50, to the city centre (Union Square) and the Iași railway station (also, nearby the main (Transbus Codreanu) coach station). The buses run every 30 minutes, and the journey time is approx. 20 minutes. As of December 2025, the fare is 4.00 lei (€0.79), for a ticket valid for 120 minutes with multiple trips on any route within the urban area.

Operator	Route	Destination	Main stops	Schedule
CTP Iași	50 Aeroport	Service from Iași railway station to Iași Airport	Gara Iași - Piața Unirii (city centre) - Tg.Cucu - Aeroport	Every 30 minutes 24/7 service

=== Taxi ===
Various taxis have access to and from the airport. The charges vary between 2.44 and 2.99 RON/km.

Being located near the border, the airport can also be reached from the Republic of Moldova by road.

== See also ==
- Aviation in Romania
- Transport in Romania
