= Dortmund Airport =

Airport in Dortmund, North Rhine-Westphalia, Germany

Dortmund Airport Flughafen Dortmund

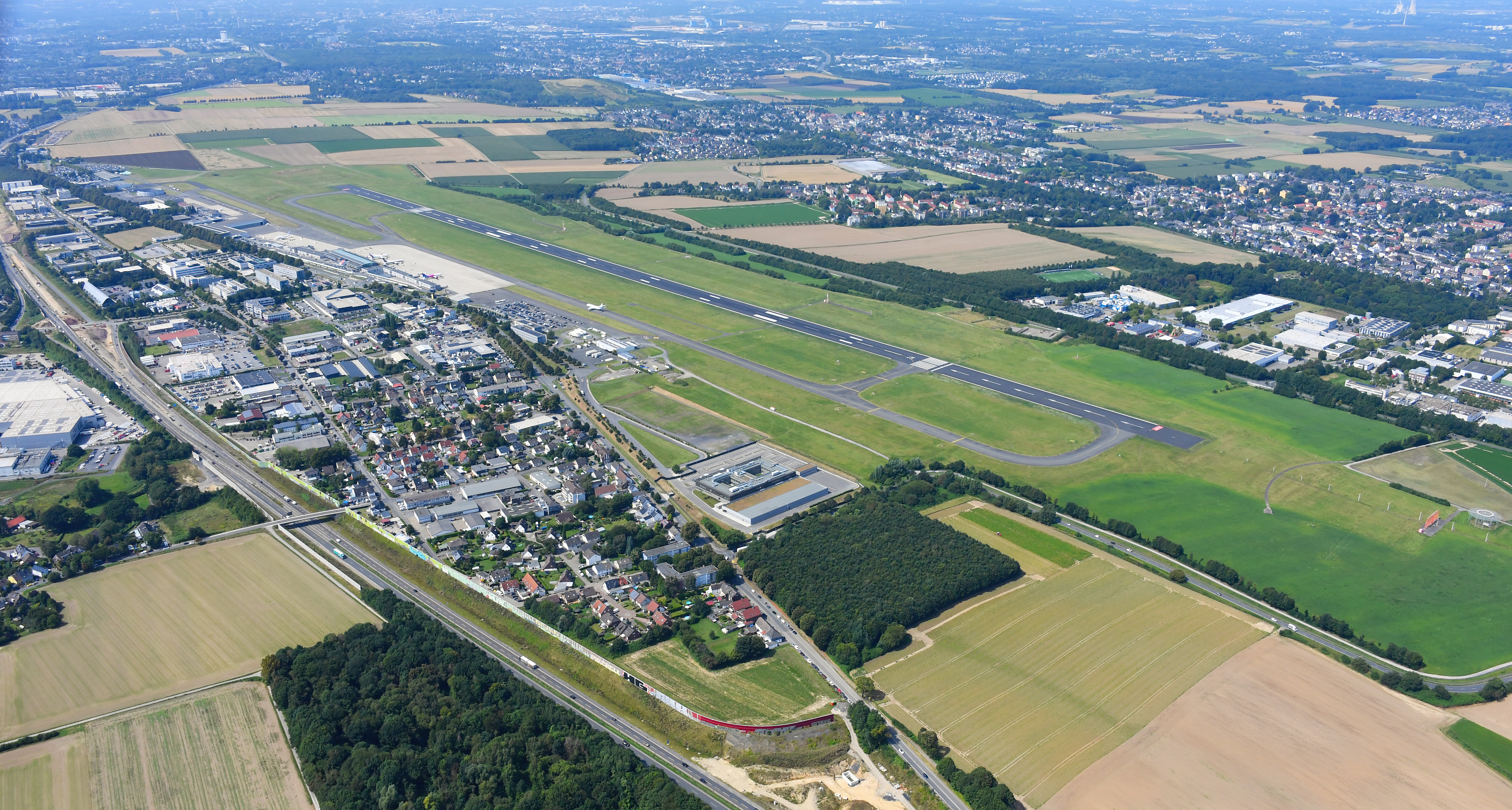
- IATA: DTM; ICAO: EDLW

Summary
- Airport type: Public
- Operator: Flughafen Dortmund GmbH
- Serves: Dortmund and the eastern Rhine-Ruhr area, Germany
- Focus city for: Wizz Air
- Elevation AMSL: 130 m (430 ft)
- Coordinates: 51°31′06″N 007°36′44″E
- Website: dortmund-airport.de

Map
- Location of airport in North Rhine-Westphalia

Runways
Direction	Length		Surface
Direction	m	ft	Surface
06/24	2,000	6,562	Asphalt

Statistics (2023)
- Passengers: 2,934,516 ▲13,5%
- Aircraft movements: 36,258 ▲25,3%
- Cargo (metric tons): 0 tonnes +/-0,0%
- Sources: Statistics at ADV., AIP at German air traffic control.

Dortmund Airport (IATA: DTM, ICAO: EDLW) is a minor international airport located 10 km (6.2 mi) east of Dortmund, North Rhine-Westphalia. It serves the eastern Rhine-Ruhr area, the largest urban agglomeration in Germany, and is mainly used for low-cost and leisure charter flights. In 2023 the airport served nearly 3 million passengers. The nearest major international airport is Düsseldorf Airport approx. 70 km (43 mi) to the southwest.

== History ==
=== Early years ===
The airport, originally located in the suburb of Brackel, was first served by commercial flights in 1925 by Aero Lloyd, which operated flights to Paris. By the business year 1927/1928, service had expanded to 2,589 commercial flights annually. During World War II the airport was used as a German air base, and was subsequently used by the British Royal Air Force. Service to Dortmund was not recommenced when German commercial air service was restarted in 1955. In 1960, the civil airfield was relocated to Dortmund-Wickede. The old airport was abandoned and occupied by British forces until the 1990s.

=== Little service ===
Over the next decades Düsseldorf Airport and Cologne Bonn Airport were the dominant commercial airports in the Rhine-Ruhr Area. Additionally Hannover Airport also covered some of the air travel needs of this region. Furthermore, the 257-km (160-mile) Sauerlandlinie opened in the late 1960s, connecting Dortmund with Frankfurt Airport in under two hours by car.

Commercial service was restored in 1979 with daily flights to Munich by Reise- und Industrieflug. Nuremberg and Stuttgart followed shortly afterwards. Following German Reunification in 1990, Dresden, Leipzig, Berlin, and London were added to the flight schedule. Reise- und Industrieflug and Nürnberger Flugdienst merged in 1990 and Eurowings was formed, which is still based in Dortmund.

Construction was started in 1998, and completed in 2000 on a new replacement terminal. This multi-level terminal prepared the airport for its resurgence.

=== Since 2000 ===
From late 2000 onwards, Dortmund Airport has experienced a drastic increase in air traffic. In the 1990s weekly service had been generally restricted to a few turboprop flights to destinations within Germany, as well as occasional charter flights to warm-weather destinations. Since 2000, several new airlines have commenced service to Dortmund, many with mainline jets since after the completation of the new terminal and the expansion of the runway of the airport. Most of the air traffic today is offered by low cost airlines operating Boeing 737 or Airbus A320 family series aircraft to warm-weather destinations and VFR-driven destinations in Eastern Europe.

The first larger carrier at Dortmund Airport was Air Berlin, which began flights to London, Milan, and Vienna in 2002, supplementing its leisure route portfolio to the Mediterranean. easyJet commenced services to Dortmund in 2004, and Germanwings followed in 2007. Air Berlin ceased most non-leisure routes from Dortmund again in 2005, while easyJet cancelled four out of its five destinations in 2012.

Since 2006 the airport has been carrying the name "Dortmund Airport 21", in reference to the fact that Dortmund's utility company, DSW21, is its major shareholder. The airport's master plan consists of the following elements: Increasing normal operating hours by one hour at night (to 23:00h), with an additional one-hour window in the morning and at night for exceptions, lengthening the runway to 2,800 m (9,200 ft), expanding the terminal and its infrastructure, improving the motorway connections and directly connecting the airport to mass transit.

At one time Eurowings had its headquarters, the Dortmund Administrative Center (Verwaltungsstandort Dortmund), at the airport. It has been relocated to Düsseldorf in 2010.

In October 2014, Air Berlin announced it was leaving Dortmund Airport entirely, cancelling their last remaining summer seasonal route to Palma de Mallorca. The airline had shut down several leisure routes from the airport in 2012.

As with easyJet in the 2000s, other low-cost carriers started opening routes from Dortmund Airport. Ryanair has progressively added new routes from Dortmund, mostly to destinations around the Mediterranean and the UK. From 2013 to 2015, Spanish low-cost airline Vueling offered a short-lived, four weekly service to Barcelona. However, Wizz Air has been the most significant contributor to the airport's resurgence. The Hungarian low-cost airline began servicing the airport in the mid 2000s by operating several routes to Eastern Europe, in large parts due to the Ruhr's significant Slavic community. In June 2020, in the midst of the COVID-19 pandemic, Wizzair announced that Dortmund Airport would become its 33rd base, being the first in Germany. However, only one year later, Wizz Air announced the closure of their Dortmund base which led to the termination of several routes.

In October 2024, Ryanair announced the termination of all routes at three German airports including Dortmund, citing high operational costs.

In December 2024, Eurowings also announced it would downsize its operations in Dortmund, terminating the year-round service to Munich as well as not resuming four seasonal destinations. In October 2025, Eurowings subsequently announced the immediate closure of its base at Dortmund Airport as of the same month, cutting four of five remaining destinations to and from the airport except Palma de Mallorca.

== Airlines and destinations ==
The following airlines offer regular scheduled and charter flights at Dortmund Airport:

Airlines	Destinations
Condor	Seasonal: Palma de Mallorca
Eurowings	Palma de Mallorca
Pegasus Airlines	Istanbul–Sabiha Gökçen; Seasonal: Antalya
SunExpress	Izmir; Seasonal: Antalya, Zonguldak
Wizz Air	Banja Luka, Belgrade, Brașov, Bratislava, Bucharest–Otopeni, Budapest, Chișinău, Cluj-Napoca, Craiova, Gdańsk, Iași, Katowice, Kutaisi, London–Luton, Milan-Malpensa (begins 25 October 2026), Niš, Ohrid, Olsztyn-Mazury, Oradea, Palermo, Podgorica, Pristina, Rome-Fiumicino (begins 25 October 2026), Sibiu, Skopje, Sofia, Suceava, Târgu Mureș, Timișoara, Tirana, Tuzla, Varna, Vilnius, Warsaw–Chopin, Wrocław, Yerevan

== Statistics ==
Direct flight destinations from Dortmund Airport (Apr 2026)

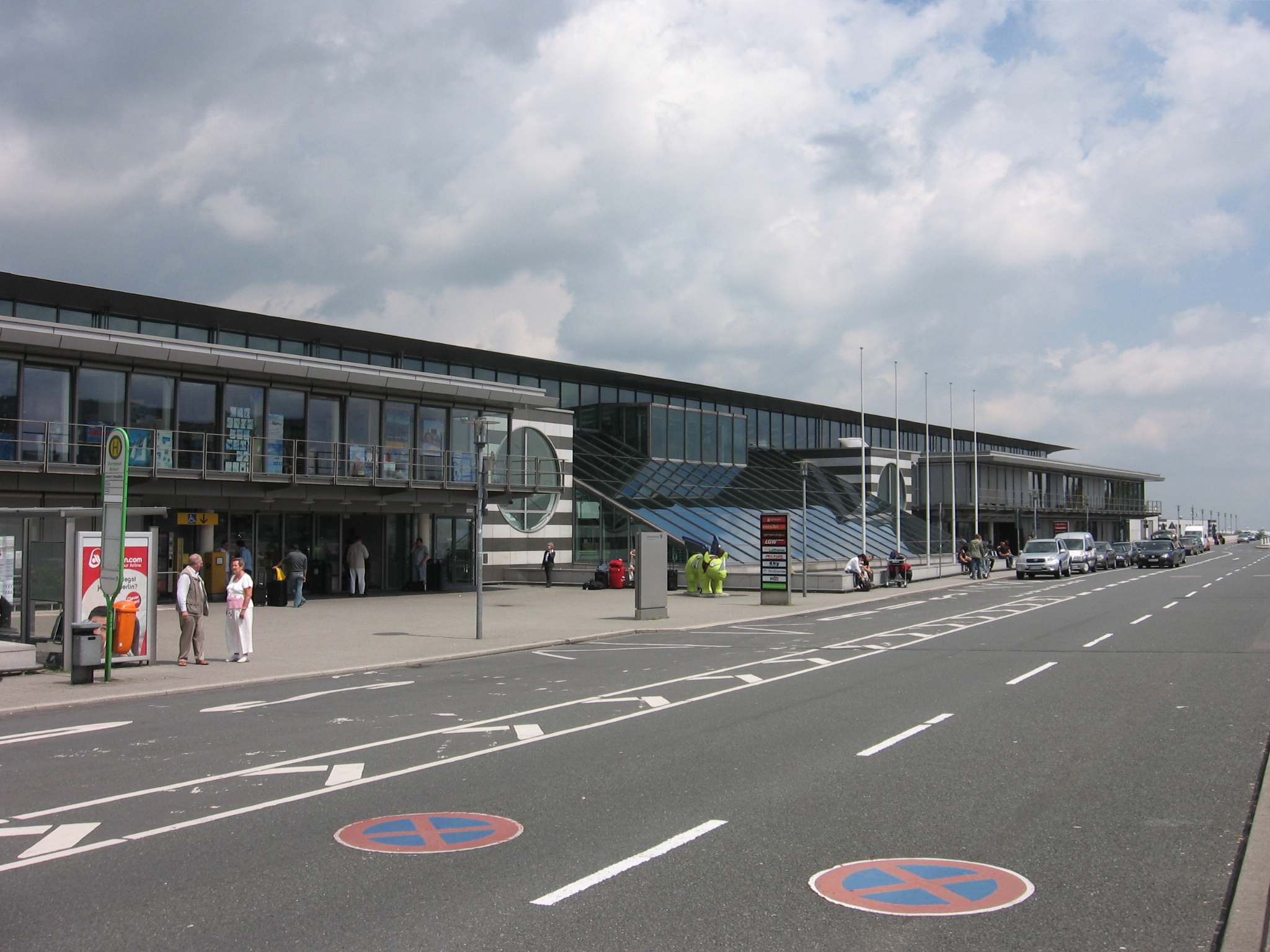
Terminal exterior

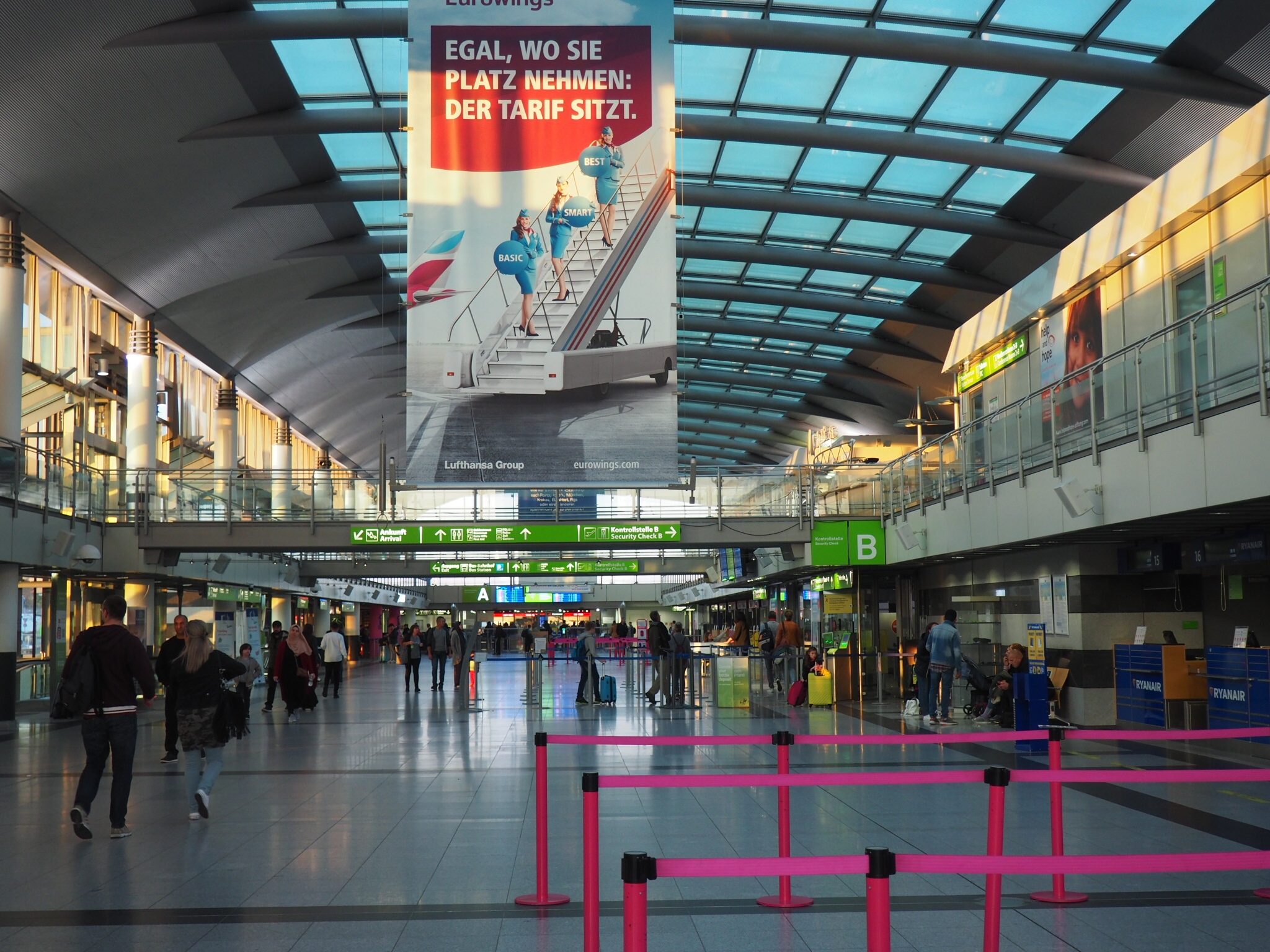
Terminal interior

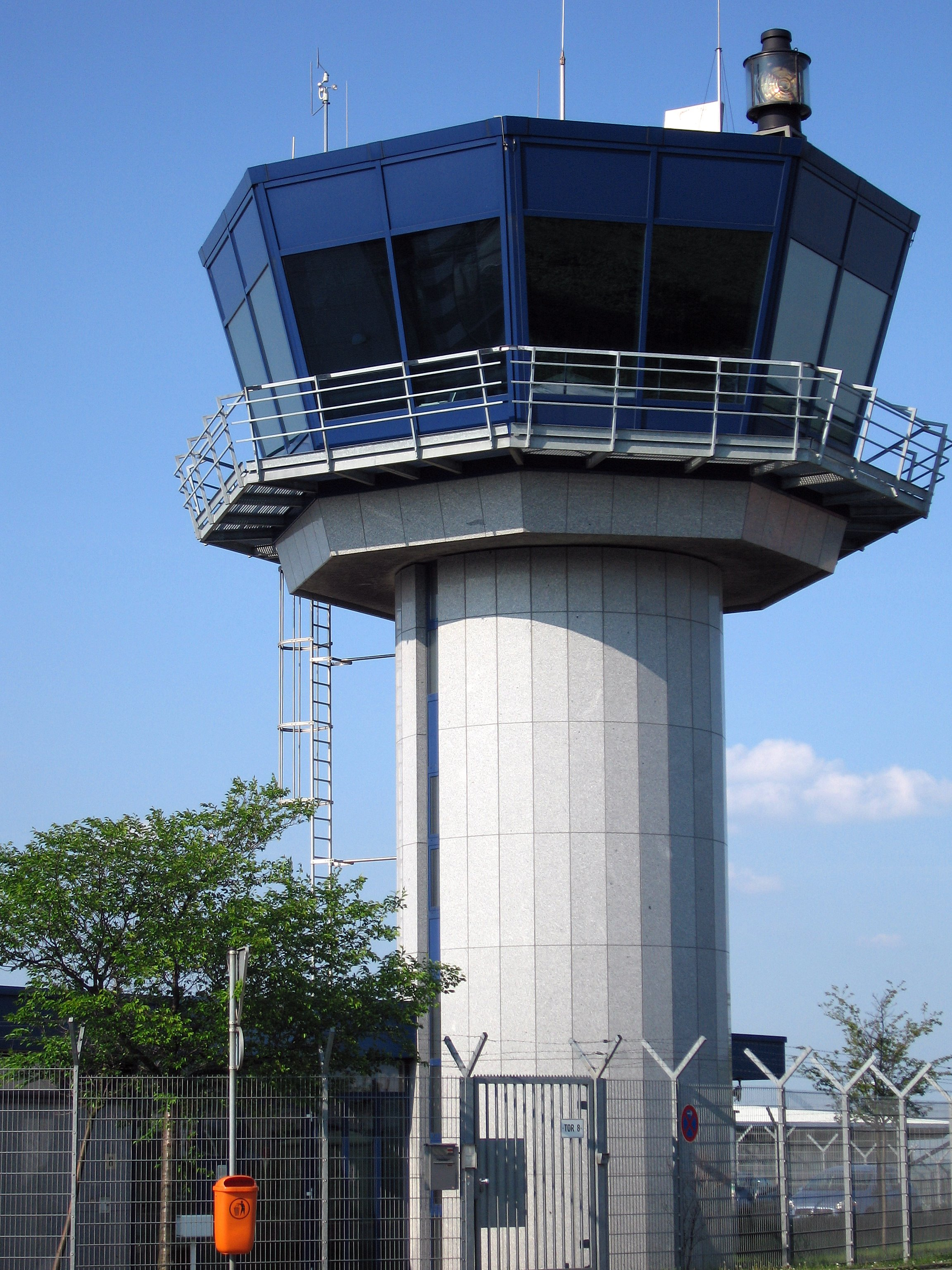
Air traffic control tower

	Passengers	Movements	Freight (in t)
2001	1,064,149	37,393	257
2002	▼994,478	▼33,812	▲289
2003	▲1,023,329	▼29,788	▼96
2004	▲1,179,028	▼25,743	▼75
2005	▲1,742,911	▲30,672	▼58
2006	▲2,019,651	▲32,785	▼37
2007	▲2,155,057	▼32,223	▲40
2008	▲2,329,440	▼29,555	▼35
2009	▼1,711,157	▼24,043	▼21
2010	▲1,747,731	▲24,232	▲33
2011	▲1,814,246	▲26,391	▼26
2012	▲1,896,885	▼22,634	▼4
2013	▲1,924,386	▲23,809	▼2
2014	▲1,964,625	▼22,202	▼0
2015	▲1,985,379	▲23,616	0
2016	▼1,918,845	▼21,719	0
2017	▲2,000,695	▲21,931	0
2018	▲2,284,202	▲25,523	0
2019	▲2,719,566	▲26,948	0
2020	▼1,220,624	▼18,983	▲4
2021	▲1,692,960	▲31,039	▼0
2022	▲2,586,238	▲36,258	0
2023	▲2,934,516		
^{Source: ADV German Airports Association}^{Dortmund Airport press release}

== Ground transportation ==
=== To Dortmund and the Ruhr area ===
Dortmund Airport is served by an express bus to Dortmund main station, a shuttle bus to the nearby railway station Holzwickede/Dortmund Flughafen, a bus to the city's metro line U47, as well as a bus to the city of Unna.

=== To Düsseldorf ===
There are two possibilities to go to Düsseldorf main station:

- Heading to Dortmund main station by the AirportExpress bus (or taking bus line 490 to Aplerbeck and then metro line U47). The direct connection from Dortmund central station to Düsseldorf is operated by frequent regional and long-distance trains.
- Catching the AirportShuttle bus to nearby Holzwickede station. The shuttle bus leaves every 20 minutes in front of the terminal building. From Holzwickede station taking the RE 13 (Maas-Wupper-Express) towards Venlo. The train runs once every hour and provides a direct connection to Düsseldorf, the travel time is approx. 60 minutes.

== Accidents and incidents ==
- On January 22, 1982, a Cessna 404 of RFG – Regionalflug on a ferry flight from Düsseldorf landing at Dortmund Airport veered off the runway, crashed into a hangar, and caught fire. The 58-year-old pilot, the sole occupant, was killed. At least four other aircraft in the hangar were destroyed or damaged. The altimeter was incorrectly set due to the pilot's visual impairment.
- On the evening of November 20, 1985, a private Cessna 421 coming from Vienna crashed about 1 kilometer short of the runway while attempting to land in bad weather. All four occupants were killed.
- On 3 January 2010, Air Berlin Flight 2450, operated by a Boeing 737-800 (D-ABKF) overran the end of the runway after an aborted take-off at high speed due to an airspeed discrepancy on the two pilots' instruments. There were no injuries among the 171 people on board.
- On 5 December 2022, a Ryanair Boeing 737 landing at Dortmund Airport overran the end of the runway, which was wet and slightly covered with snow. None of the 175 people on board were injured.

== See also ==
- Transport in Germany
- List of airports in Germany
