= Bucharest Henri Coandă International Airport =

Airport in Romania

Bucharest Henri Coandă International Airport Aeroportul Internațional Henri Coandă București

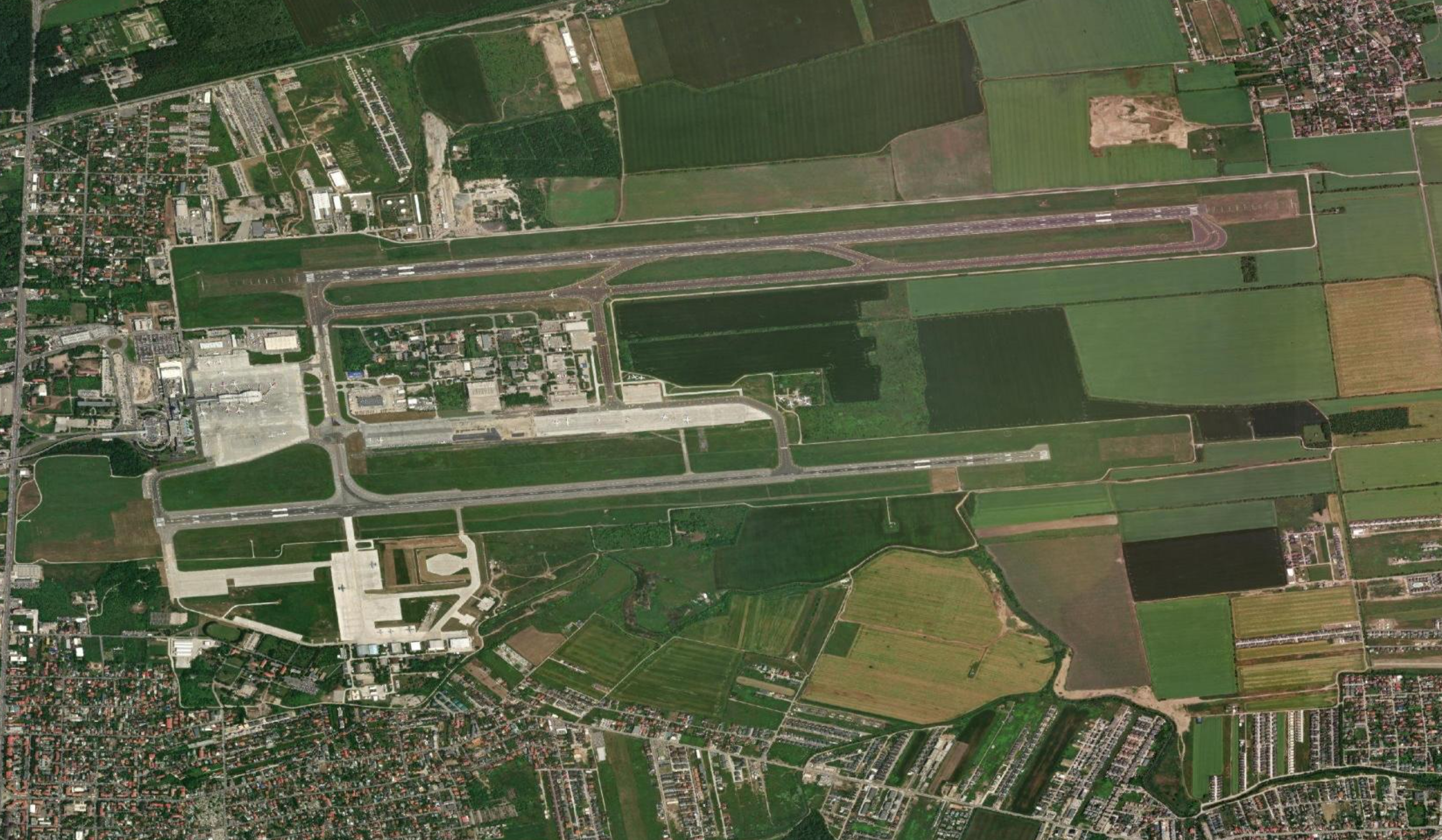
- Satellite view in June 2025
- IATA: OTP; ICAO: LROP

Summary
- Airport type: Public / Military
- Owner: Ministry of Transport and Infrastructure
- Operator: CNAB (National Company Bucharest Airports)
- Serves: Bucharest metropolitan area
- Location: Otopeni
- Opened: 1969
- Hub for: HiSky; TAROM
- Operating base for: AnimaWings; FlyOne; Ryanair; Wizz Air
- Elevation AMSL: 314 ft (96 m)
- Coordinates: 44°34′16″N 26°05′06″E
- Website: bucharestairports.ro

Maps
- Airport diagram

- Location within Romania

Runways
Direction	Length		Surface
Direction	m	ft	Surface
08R/26L	3,500	11,484	Asphalt
08L/26R	3,500	11,484	Asphalt

Helipads
Number	Length		Surface
Number	m	ft	Surface
H1	3.5	11	Concrete

Statistics (2025)
- Passengers: 17,001,578
- Passengers change 2024–25: ▲6.6%
- Aircraft movements: 127,736
- Sources: AIP at the Romanian Airports Association (RAA)

Bucharest Henri Coandă International Airport (Romanian: Aeroportul Internațional Henri Coandă București) (IATA: OTP, ICAO: LROP), also known as Bucharest Otopeni Airport, is Romania's busiest international airport, located in Otopeni, 16.5 km (10.3 mi) north of Bucharest's city centre. In 2025, the airport handled over 17 million passengers. It covers 605 hectares (1,490 acres) of land and contains two parallel runways, both 3,500 metres (11,500 ft) long. It is one of the two airports serving the capital of Romania, the other being the smaller Băneasa Aurel Vlaicu Airport, located within the city.

Originally intended as a civil aviation and military training centre, the airfield was used as a military base during World War II and remained a major military airfield until 1965, when its conversion into a commercial airport began. It opened to civilian traffic in 1969, with a new passenger terminal opening in April 1970. In 2004, the airport was renamed after Romanian flight pioneer Henri Coandă (1886–1972), builder of the Coandă-1910 aircraft and discoverer of the Coandă effect of fluidics.

Henri Coandă International Airport serves as headquarters and a hub for TAROM, Romania's flag carrier, as well as a hub for HiSky. It also serves as a base of operations for several other airlines, including Animawings, FlyOne, Ryanair and Wizz Air. It is managed by the National Company Bucharest Airports (Compania Națională Aeroporturi București S.A.). The military section of the airport is used as the 90th Airlift Base of the Romanian Air Force.

== History ==
=== Early years ===
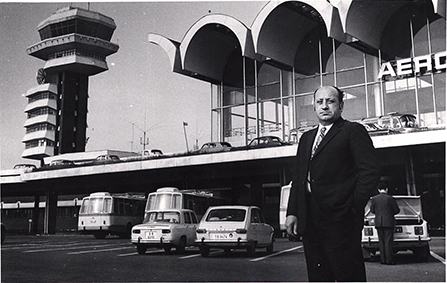
Architect Cezar Lăzărescu

Originally, the airport in Otopeni was intended to be used as a Romanian civil aviation and military training center. During World War II, it was used as an airbase by the Luftwaffe. It was further developed in 1943, becoming one of the principal Luftwaffe bases around Bucharest. By 1944, it featured a beam approach system and two concrete runways, one of 1,370 metres (4,490 ft) aligned North-South and one of 1,190 metres (3,900 ft) aligned East-West. After 23 August 1944, the airport was used to launch air raids on Bucharest in support of the German efforts to overthrow the new government. It was bombed by the USAAF on 26 August and taken over by the Romanian military in the aftermath.

Until 1965, it was a major airfield for the Romanian Air Force, with Băneasa Airport serving as Bucharest's commercial airport. In 1965, with the growth of air traffic, the Otopeni airbase was converted to a commercial airport. The runway was modernized and extended to 3,500 metres (11,500 ft) from the previous 1,200 metres (3,900 ft), making it one of the longest in Europe at that time.

In August 1969, when United States President Richard Nixon visited Romania, a VIP lounge was inaugurated. A new passenger terminal (designed by Cezar Lăzărescu), with a capacity of 1,200,000 passengers per year, was opened on 13 April 1970, for domestic and international flights. An improvement program added a second runway in 1986, expanding capacity to 35 aircraft movements per hour.

In 1992, Otopeni Airport became a regular member of Airports Council International (ACI).

=== Expansion since the 1990s ===
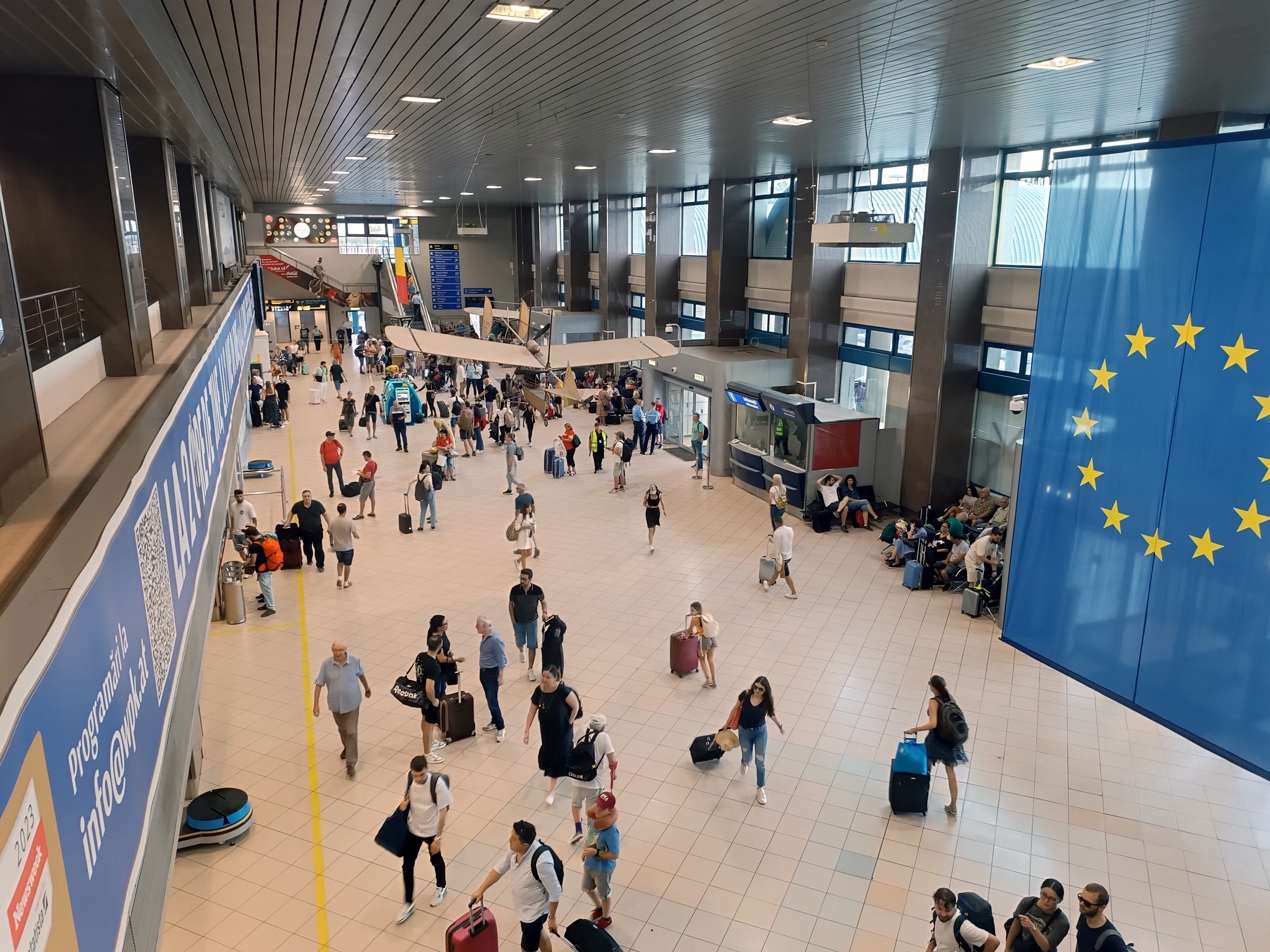
The older of the two check-in halls

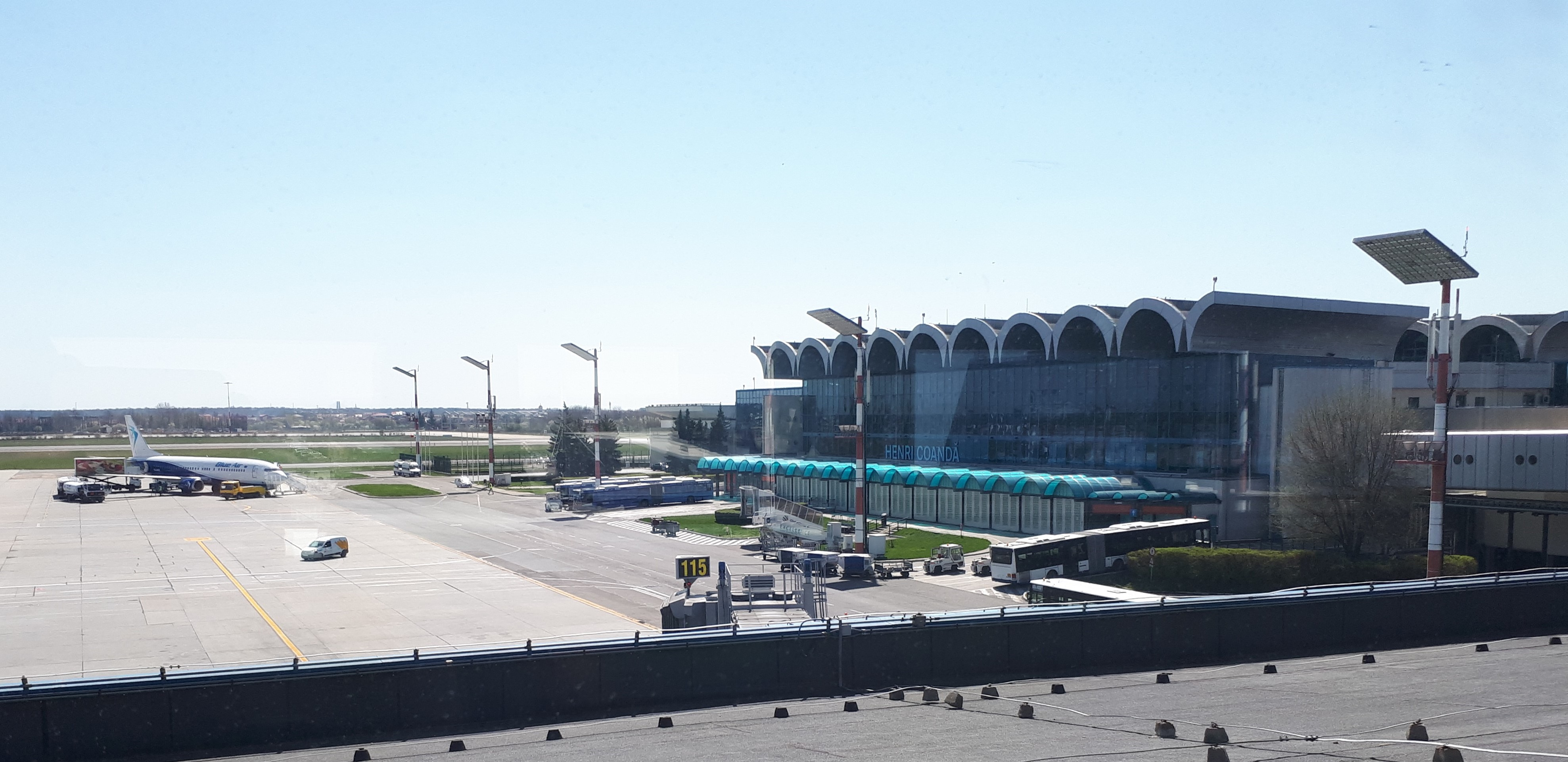
Arrivals hall

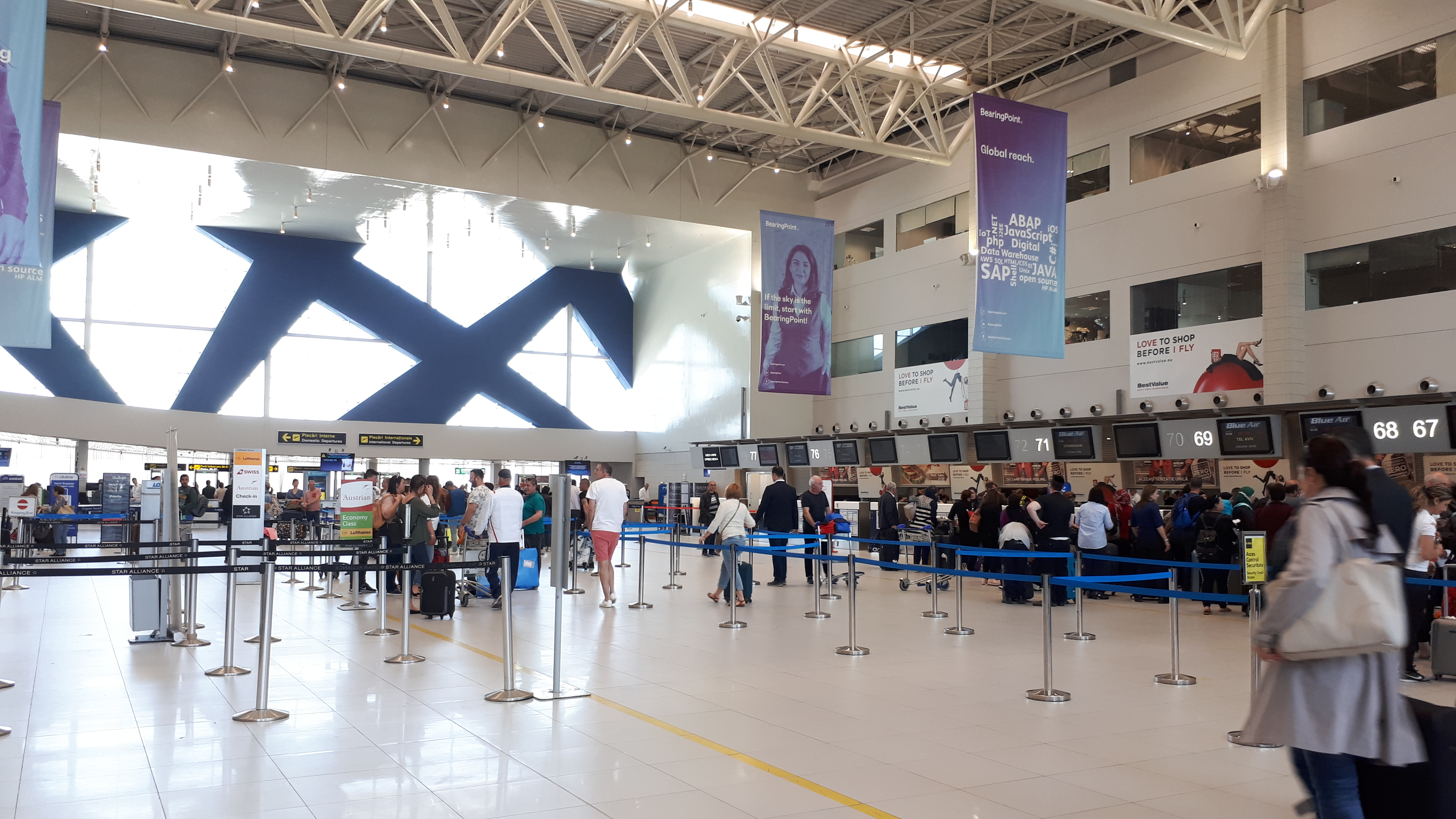
The newer check-in hall

The first stage of the plan (Phase I), taking place between 1994 and 1998, involved the construction of a new departures terminal and of a new airside concourse with five jetways and nine gates (referred to as 'the Finger') as well as the extension of airport ramps and of their associated taxiways.

The second phase (labeled Phase II/IIe) of the plan led to the construction of a terminal dedicated to domestic flights and of a multi-story car park (2003), the complete overhaul of the control tower (between 2005 and 2007) as well as the transformation of the old terminal building into a dedicated arrivals hall (in 2000). During the same phase, two high-speed taxiways (Victor and Whiskey) were constructed. Phase II was completed in 2007.

TAROM ended its unprofitable service to New York City in November 2003. In June 2007, Delta Air Lines began flying the same route with Boeing 767s. The company made the link seasonal in 2008. Delta terminated it in September 2009 due to the recession and difficulty competing with other airlines. In June 2024, HiSky commenced service to New York, reconnecting Bucharest to the United States.

The third stage of the plan (Phase III), which started in 2009, involved the extension of the airside concourse ('the Finger') with 15 new gates (nine of which have jetways), as well as the expansion of the Departure Hall (with 8 new gates). The airside concourse extension, designed by Studio Capelli Architettura & Associati, and measuring 17,000 square metres (200,000 ft^{2}), was inaugurated on 29 March 2011. It was followed, in November 2012, by the extension of the Departure Hall to a total area of 38,600 square metres (400,000 ft^{2}).

In March 2012, all air traffic except for business air traffic was transferred from Aurel Vlaicu International Airport (at that time Bucharest's low-cost hub) to Henri Coandă International Airport. Air Canada Rouge introduced seasonal routes to Toronto and Montreal in June 2018. The carrier operated the flights with Boeing 767s.

=== Future development ===
Beyond Phase III, a new terminal building (Henri Coandă 2) at the eastern end of the current location is envisaged. The new building is expected to include a large commercial space. Henri Coandă 2 will be of a modular design, consisting of four separate buildings, each capable of handling 5 million passengers annually. Each module will be built as traffic demands dictate. By 2030, Terminal 2 alone should be able to handle the expected volume of 20 million passengers per year. The terminal will be directly connected to the A3 motorway and to the railway system. However, the plans might get delayed due to funding problems.

On 18 January 2021, it has been announced that the airport purchased all the land it needs in order to begin the expansion. However, on 15 May 2023, the Minister of Transport and Infrastructure declared that a new terminal will not be built in the near future, because it is not necessary, a declaration which sparked criticism.

== Terminals ==
The airport's facilities consist of a single terminal with three main facilities (colloquially referred to as "Terminals"): the Departures Hall/Terminal, the Arrivals Hall/Terminal, and the Finger Terminal (the airside concourse). A walkway with shops connects the departures and arrivals buildings. The airside concourse is organized in two (domestic and international) passengers flows. The entire terminal has 104 check-in desks, 38 gates (of which 14 are equipped with jetways), and a total floor area of 86,000 square metres (930,000 sq ft).

== Airlines and destinations ==
=== Passenger ===
The following airlines operate regular scheduled and charter flights at Bucharest Henri Coandă Airport:

Airlines	Destinations
Aegean Airlines	Athens
airBaltic	Riga
Air China	Beijing–Capital, Zagreb
Air France	Paris–Charles de Gaulle
Air Serbia	Belgrade
AJet	Ankara
Animawings	Cluj-Napoca, Geneva, Iași, Istanbul, London–Gatwick, Munich, Oradea, Paris–Charles de Gaulle, Prague, Rotterdam, Stockholm–Arlanda, Timișoara (all flights suspended)
Austrian Airlines	Vienna
British Airways	London–Heathrow
Dan Air	Aleppo, Amman–Queen Alia (begins 27 June 2027), Damascus, Dublin, Tbilisi (begins 27 June 2027), Valencia (begins 27 June 2027) (all flights suspended)
El Al	Tel Aviv
Etihad Airways	Abu Dhabi (begins 16 December 2026)
Eurowings	Düsseldorf, Stuttgart
flydubai	Dubai–International
FlyOne	Larnaca
HiSky	Arad, Brussels, Chișinău, Cluj-Napoca, Dublin, New York–JFK, Oradea, Paris–Charles de Gaulle, Timișoara, Tel Aviv
Iberia	Seasonal: Madrid
KLM	Amsterdam
LOT Polish Airlines	Warsaw–Chopin; Charter: Podgorica
Lufthansa	Frankfurt, Munich
Lufthansa City Airlines	Frankfurt, Munich
Luxair	Luxembourg
Norwegian Air Shuttle	Helsinki, Oslo; Seasonal: Stockholm–Arlanda
Pegasus Airlines	Istanbul–Sabiha Gökçen; Seasonal: Antalya
Qatar Airways	Doha
Ryanair	Berlin, Birmingham, Bologna, Bristol, Brussels Charleroi, Catania, Crotone, Dublin, Edinburgh, Gdańsk, Lamezia Terme, Leeds/Bradford, London–Stansted, Madrid, Málaga, Malta, Manchester, Marseille, Milan-Bergamo, Milan–Malpensa, Naples, Paphos, Paris Beauvais, Pescara, Pisa, Rome–Ciampino, Thessaloniki, Tirana, Treviso, Vienna; Seasonal: Chania, Corfu, Genoa, Palma de Mallorca, Palermo, Perugia, Skiathos, Zadar
SkyUp	Hurghada, Sharm El Sheikh
Smartwings	Prague (resumes 4 March 2027)
SunExpress	Antalya; Seasonal: İzmir (begins 30 March 2027)
Swiss International Air Lines	Zurich
TAROM	Amman–Queen Alia, Amsterdam, Arad, Athens, Baia Mare, Beirut, Belgrade, Brussels, Budapest, Cairo, Chișinău, Cluj-Napoca, Frankfurt, Iași, Istanbul, Madrid, Oradea, Paris–Charles de Gaulle, Prague, Sharm El Sheikh, Sofia, Suceava, Timișoara, Tel Aviv; Seasonal: Nice, Rome–Fiumicino, Thessaloniki
Turkish Airlines	Istanbul
Wizz Air	Alicante, Almeria, Athens, Barcelona, Bari, Basel-Mulhouse, Berlin, Billund, Birmingham, Bologna, Bordeaux, Brindisi, Brussels Charleroi, Castellón, Catania, Chișinău, Cologne, Copenhagen, Dortmund, Dubai–International, Eindhoven, Gdańsk, Gran Canaria, Larnaca, Leeds/Bradford, Lisbon, Liverpool, London–Luton, Lyon, Madrid, Málaga, Malta, Milan-Bergamo, Nice, Nuremberg, Oslo-Sandefjord, Paris Beauvais, Pescara, Pisa, Porto, Prague, Rome–Fiumicino, Santander, Seville, Stuttgart, Tel Aviv, Tenerife–South, Turin, Turku, Valencia, Yerevan, Zaragoza; Seasonal: Alghero, Antalya, Corfu, Faro, Dubrovnik, Heraklion, Kefalonia, Marrakesh, Mykonos, Palma de Mallorca, Santorini, Venice Treviso, Zakynthos

=== Cargo ===
Airlines	Destinations
DHL Aviation	Leipzig/Halle, Milan–Malpensa
MSC Air Cargo	Hong Kong
Saudia Cargo	Dammam, Riyadh
Turkish Cargo	Istanbul
UPS Airlines	Cologne/Bonn

== Statistics ==
=== Passengers ===
In 2025, 17,001,578 passengers passed through the airport, an increase of 6.61% compared to 2024. In 2018, the airport handled 13.8 million passengers (63.3% of all the passengers carried by Romanian airports) and 39,534 tons of cargo (81.4% of the cargo handled by Romanian airports).

Annual traffic
Year	Passengers (total)	Change	Passengers (domestic flights)	Aircraft movements	Cargo (tonnes)
2005	2,972,799	-	-	49,593	16,887
2006	3,497,938	▲17.6%	-	55,056	18,089
2007	4,937,683	▲41.1%	410,916	67,372	17,423
2008	5,063,555	▲2.5%	497,208	69,916	22,464
2009	4,480,765	▼11.5%	496,391	69,692	21,585
2010	4,916,964	▲9.7%	-	71,481	-
2011	5,049,443	▲2.7%	-	-	-
2012	7,120,024	▲41%	-	98,600	26,493
2013	7,643,467	▲7.3%	-	86,730	28,432
2014	8,316,705	▲8.8%	-	91,788	29,193
2015	9,282,884	▲11.6%	502,928	97,218	31,421
2016	10,982,967	▲18.3%	872,915	108,285	34,125
2017	12,804,191	▲16.6%	1,289,596	116,718	37,415
2018	13,824,830	▲7.95%	-	122,966	-
2019	14,697,239	▲6.34%	-	-	-
2020	4,456,577	▼59.68%	-	-	-
2021	6,914,610	▲55.2%	-	-	-
2022	12,610,247	▲82.37%	-	102,134	-
2023	14,630,715	▲16.11%	-	111,820	-
2024	15,946,791	▲8.99%	-	118,693	-
2025	17,001,578	▲6.61%	998,892	127,736	42,211

=== Busiest routes ===
Busiest domestic routes from Henri Coandă International Airport
Rank	Airport	Passengers 2016	Passengers 2017	Passengers 2018	Carriers
1	Cluj Airport	289,665	493,956	489,757	TAROM, HiSky
2	Timișoara Airport	219,070	356,684	410,140	TAROM, HiSky
3	Iași Airport	285,085	297,879	286,728	TAROM
^{Sources:Eurostat, INSSE}

Busiest international routes to and from OTP (2024)
Rank	City
1	London
2	Istanbul
3	Rome
4	Bergamo
5	Vienna
6	Amsterdam
7	Tel Aviv
8	Frankfurt
9	Paris
10	Madrid

=== Busiest airlines ===
Busiest airlines to and from OTP (2024)
Rank	Airline	Alliance
1	Wizz Air	
2	Ryanair	
3	TAROM	SkyTeam
4	HiSky	
5	Lufthansa	Star Alliance
6	Turkish Airlines	Star Alliance
7	Austrian Airlines	Star Alliance
8	KLM Royal Dutch Airlines	SkyTeam
9	LOT Polish Airlines	Star Alliance
10	Air France	SkyTeam

== Ground transportation ==
=== Rail ===
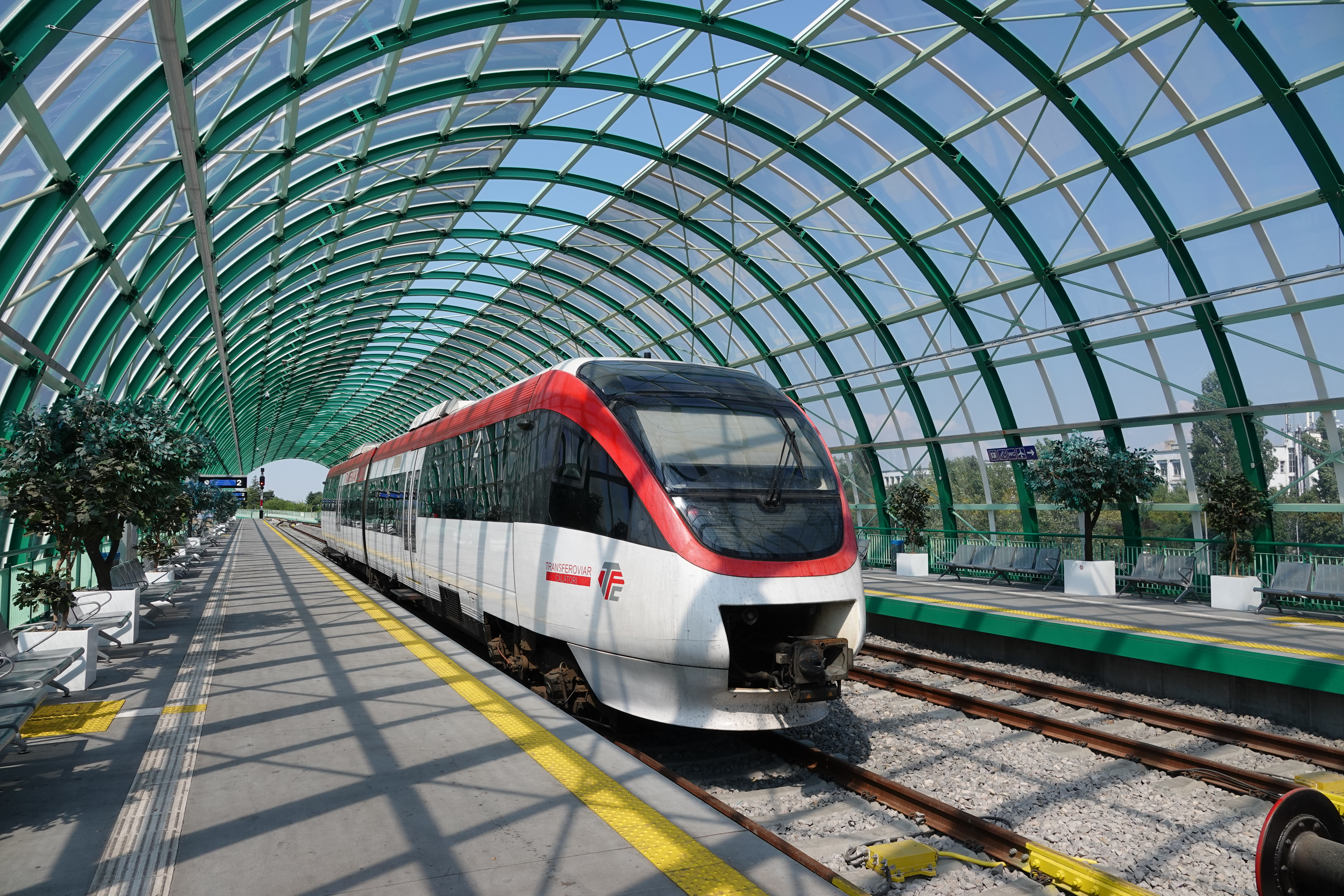
Transferoviar Călători train parked at the arport train station

An airport rail link service to the main railway station, Gara de Nord (Bucharest North), runs from the Henri Coandă Airport railway station, located near the parking lot of the Arrivals hall. Trains operated by CFR and Transferoviar Călători run 24 hours a day, every 40 minutes, and the journey takes about 20–25 minutes.

Metro Line M6, currently under construction, will connect the airport to Gara de Nord and integrate it into the Bucharest Metro network.

=== Bus ===
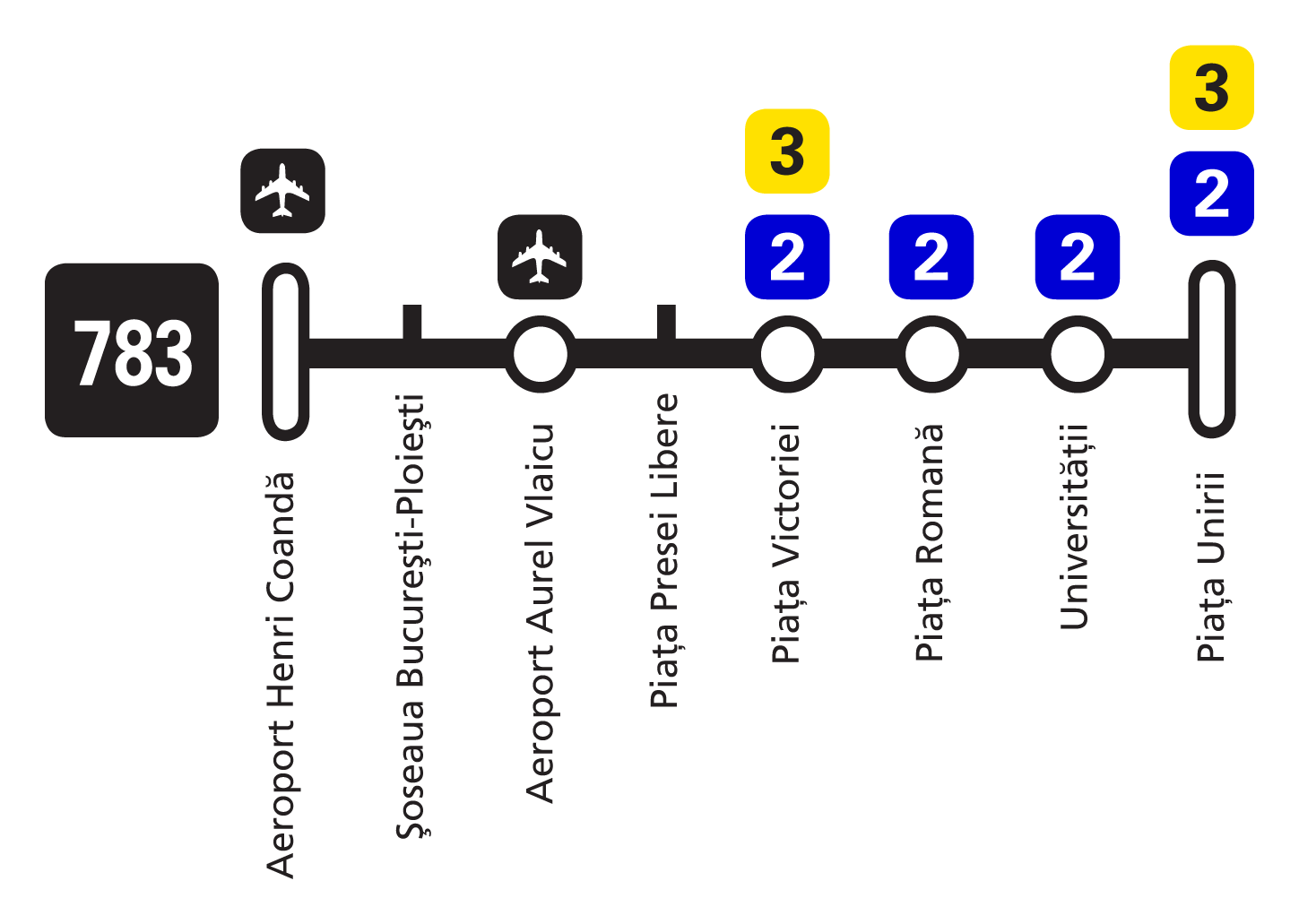
Former STB express route 783 (now 100) diagram, showing connections to Bucharest Metro lines and city airport

Henri Coandă Airport is served by Bucharest's public transport operator STB. Express bus line 100 connects the airport with the city centre (Piața Unirii) and operates 24 hours a day; buses run roughly every 15 minutes during the day (every 20 minutes at weekends) and every 30 minutes at night. Journey times typically range from about 35 to 50 minutes, depending on traffic, and can be significantly longer during peak periods, occasionally approaching 75 minutes.

Express bus line 442 also serves the airport, linking Piața Presei Liberei in northern Bucharest with Therme Bucharest via Henri Coandă Airport.

=== Car ===
The airport is 16.5 km (10.3 mi) north of central Bucharest, to which it is connected by the DN1 national road. DN1 also connects to the nearby A0 ring motorway and Bucharest Băneasa Aurel Vlaicu International Airport, located within the city.

Plans for the development of the airport include a new access road linking the proposed Terminal 2 to the A0 motorway ring, designed so that it can later be extended to the A3 motorway, providing an additional road connection to the city and the surrounding region.

=== Taxi and ride-share ===
Taxis serving Henri Coandă Airport can be ordered using touch-screen terminals in the arrivals hall, which connect passengers with licensed taxi companies. The system was introduced in 2013 as part of a reorganisation of taxi services at the airport, replacing an earlier phone-based ordering scheme and intended to simplify bookings and reduce problems with intermediaries and unauthorised drivers soliciting passengers and overcharging.

Ride-sharing services such as Uber and Bolt also operate at the airport, using authorised pick-up areas in a dedicated ride-sharing zone on the upper level of the multi-storey car park in front of the international arrivals terminal.

== Incidents and accidents ==
- On 9 February 1989, a TAROM Tupolev TU-154 crashed during a training flight following a simulated engine failure when a flight crew member raised the flaps too soon. All 5 occupants were killed.
- On 31 March 1995, TAROM Flight 371, an Airbus A310-324 registered as YR-LCC, simultaneously experienced asymmetric thrust during climb and one of the pilots being incapacitated. The plane crashed near Balotești just two minutes after takeoff. All 60 people aboard were killed.
- On 30 December 2007, a TAROM Boeing 737-300 (YR-BGC "Constanța"), flying Flight 3107 hit a beacon-maintenance vehicle on the runway while taking off for Sharm-el-Sheikh. The aircraft stopped beside the runway and was severely damaged.

== See also ==
- List of the busiest airports in Europe by passenger traffic
- List of the busiest airports in Romania
- List of airports in Romania
- Aviation in Romania
- Transportation in Romania
