= Oradea International Airport =

Airport in northwestern Romania

Oradea International Airport Aeroportul Internațional Oradea
- IATA: OMR; ICAO: LROD

Summary
- Airport type: Public
- Operator: Government
- Serves: Oradea, Romania
- Opened: 1938
- Elevation AMSL: 465 ft (142 m)
- Coordinates: 47°01′31″N 21°54′09″E
- Website: aeroportoradea.ro

Map
- Location of airport in Romania

Runways
Direction	Length		Surface
Direction	m	ft	Surface
01/19	2,520	8,268	Asphalt

Statistics (2025)
- Passengers: 256,945 ▲
- Aircraft movements: 4,283 ▲
- Source: AIP at the Romanian Airports Association (RAA)

Oradea Airport (IATA: OMR, ICAO: LROD) is an international airport located 5 km (3.1 mi) southwest of Oradea in northwestern Romania, Bihor County, near one of the main road and rail border crossings to Hungary. It is also located near the European route E60 and the future Transylvania motorway - has led to a double digit growth in passenger and cargo traffic for the past two years.

The airport competes with the neighboring Debrecen Airport in Hungary.

== Development and history ==
The civilian airport became operational in 1938. In 2009, Bihor County contracted consultancy services regarding the extension of the runway, the construction of a cargo terminal, and the renovation of the passenger terminal. The airport terminal is now renovated to European Union (and Schengen Area) standards, and offers various specific facilities and modern amenities such as car rental, exchange offices, various shops, etc.

Regarding the runway (and other connected facilities), the Bihor County Commission completed the final contractual formalities with the EU Commission representatives, as this type of infrastructure work was eligible for European funds. A €30 million financing agreement for the EU funds was signed on 7 February 2014. Works on the new 2,100 m (6,890 ft) runway, two rapid-exit taxiways and other facility buildings began on 20 October 2014. In May 2025, the new cargo terminal opened with 13.000 square meters of facilities.

The construction works for the runway modernization were completed on 30 October 2015. The runway was further extended to 2520m soon after.

In the summer of 2024, the county established a public company to subsidize international flights. As of August 2026, HiSky, LOT Polish Airlines, Wizz Air and Lufthansa have been approved.

== Airlines and destinations ==
The following airlines operate regular scheduled and charter flights at Oradea Airport:

Airlines	Destinations
Animawings	Bucharest–Otopeni; Seasonal: Heraklion
Corendon Airlines	Seasonal charter: Antalya
HiSky	Bucharest–Otopeni; Seasonal charter: Monastir
LOT Polish Airlines	Warsaw–Chopin
Lufthansa	Munich
Sky Express	Seasonal charter: Heraklion
TAROM	Bucharest–Otopeni
Wizz Air	Bergamo, Dortmund, Rome–Fiumicino

== Statistics ==
Year	Passengers	Annual change
2008	38,843	Steady
2009	41,692	▲7.3%
2010	36,477	▼12.5%
2011	Steady	Steady
2012	40,357	▲
2013	39,440	▼2.2%
2014	36,501	▼7.4%
2015	8,118	▼77.7%
2016	41,867	▲415.7%
2017	162,902	▲289.1%
2018	220,012	▲35.1%
2019	94,997	▼56.8%
2020	37,911	▼60.1%
2021	134,519	▲254.8%
2022	208,541	▲55.0%
2023	152,543	▼27.0%
2024	169,166	▲10.9%
2025	256,945	▲51.89%

== Other use ==
=== Military ===
Since April 2009, the NATO Centre of Excellence in Oradea is a member of NATO's Centres of Excellence (COE) network. All aircraft involved in Oradea's NATO Centre of Excellence activities utilize the Oradea International Airport.

=== Air ambulance ===
A MEDIVAC helicopter is based at Oradea International Airport. It is operated by the Pelican Hospital's Emergency Service. It serves Bihor, Sălaj, Satu Mare, Maramureș and Arad Counties Emergency Services. The air ambulance transports persons to Level I trauma centers located in Bucharest.

=== Cargo ===
In May 2025, a new cargo terminal opened at the airport, and was first serviced by an MNG Airlines Airbus A321 to Istanbul Airport . The terminal aims to serve strategic transport routes to Hungary. The following day, the airline repeated the service with an Airbus A300 Wide-body aircraft. The facility includes 13.000 square meters of space, with security, border and other services.

== Accidents and incidents ==
- On 4 February 1970, an Antonov 24B operated by TAROM crashed into the mountains near Oradea while inbound from Bucharest Otopeni International. 14 out of the 15 people on board died.
- On 27 May 1971, an Ilyushin 14 operated by TAROM was hijacked after departure from Oradea. The hijackers demanded to go to Austria where they surrendered.
- On 20 September 1994 an Antonov An-26 of the Romanian Air Force, registration 508 was written off in a takeoff accident at Oradea. During the takeoff roll, the flight engineer (student) retracted the landing gear before the captain's order.
- On 16 January 2009, a Gulfstream G200, operated by Ion Ţiriac Air was damaged after it overran the runway. The aircraft suffered damage to the nose and the landing gear was broken. All 12 occupants were reported as having survived and suffered no injuries. The aircraft came to a halt near the fence surrounding the airport

== Ground transportation ==
Oradea Transport Local provides a bus service (No. 28) between Oradea International Airport and the city centre of Oradea. The price of a ticket is 3 RON. The timetable of this route is adjusted to the arrivals and departures of the flights. Cabs/taxis are also available. The price of a ride to the city centre is about 30 RON.

== See also ==
- Aviation in Romania
- Transport in Romania
