= HiSky =

Airline of Moldova and Romania

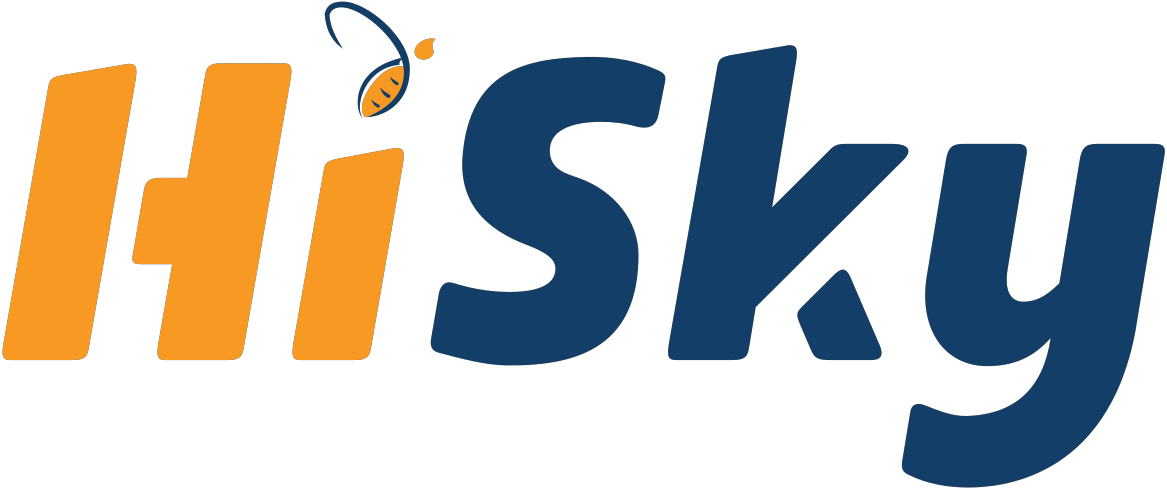

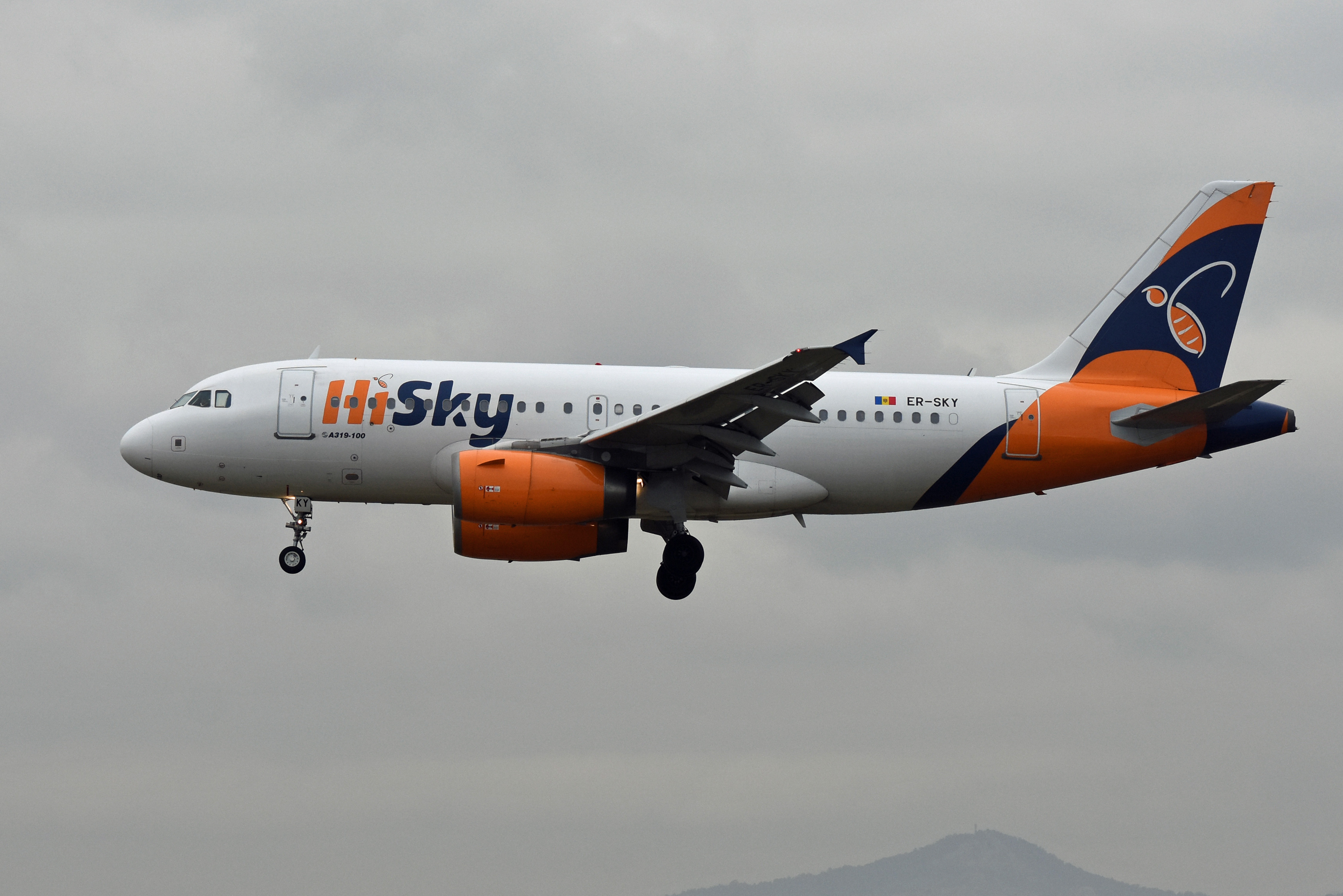
- HiSky Airbus A319
IATA	ICAO	Call sign
H7	HYM	SKY MOLDOVA
- Founded: 27 September 2019; 7 years ago
- Commenced operations: 5 March 2021; 5 years ago
- AOC #: MD 025
- Operating bases: Chișinău
- Focus cities: Beauvais
- Fleet size: 1
- Destinations: 4
- Headquarters: Chișinău, Moldova
- Key people: Iulian Scorpan (CEO)
- Website: www.hisky.aero

HiSky Europe

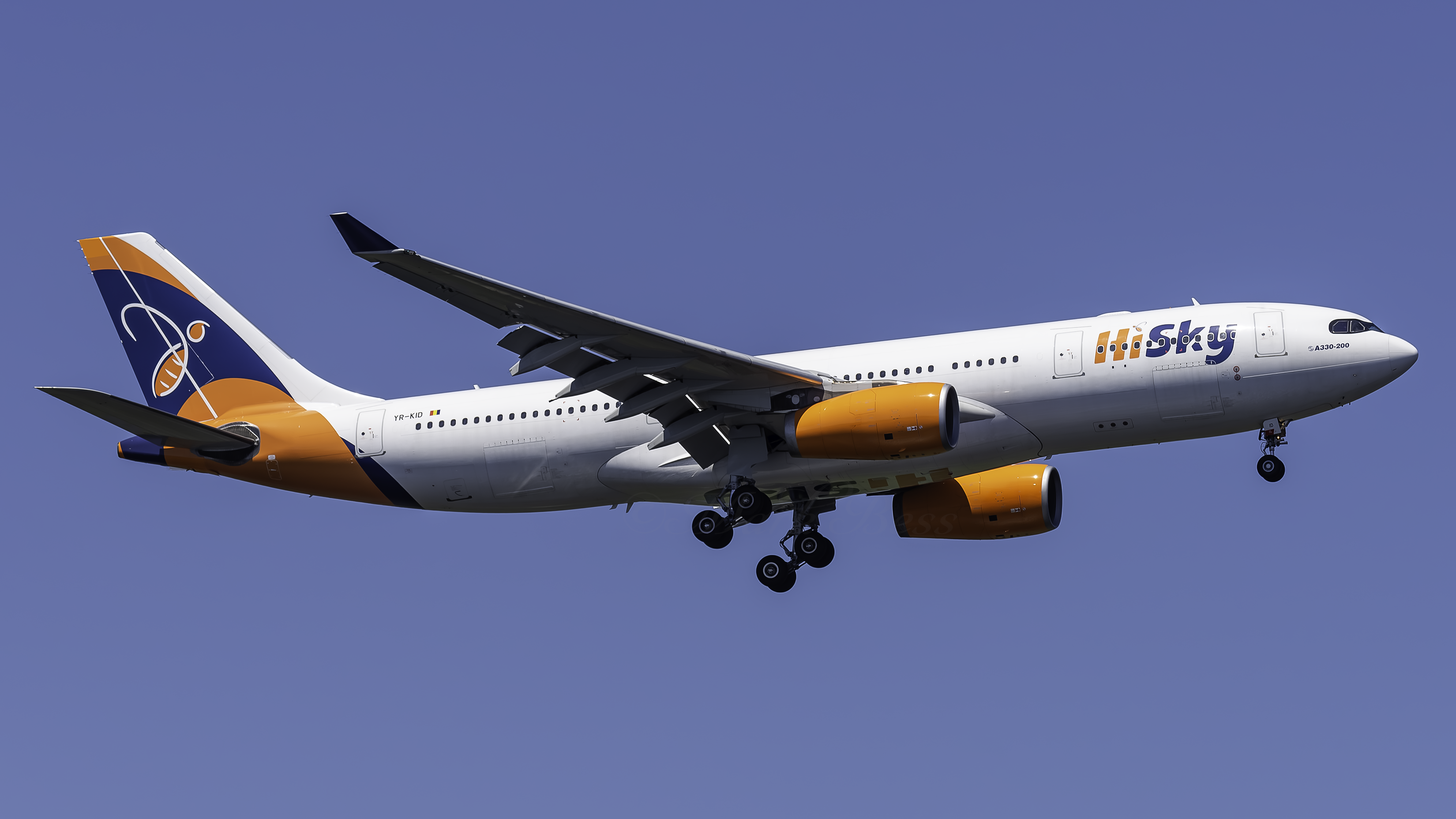
- HiSky Europe Airbus A330-243
IATA	ICAO	Call sign
H4	HYS	SKY EUROPE
- AOC #: RO-074
- Operating bases: Bucharest–Otopeni
- Focus cities: Dublin
- Fleet size: 8
- Destinations: 25
- Headquarters: Bucharest, Romania
- Website: www.hisky.aero

HiSky is a Moldovan low-cost airline group founded in 2019 in Chișinău, Moldova, operating through two affiliated entities: HiSky SRL, with its main base at Chișinău Eugen Doga International Airport, and HiSky Europe SRL, a Romanian carrier with its main base at Bucharest Henri Coandă International Airport.

== History ==
HiSky was founded in 2019 by CEO Iulian Scorpan, a former pilot and director of Air Moldova, alongside Victor Sula, a specialist in the financial and banking sector. HiSky Europe SRL, the Romanian affiliate established in 2020, is jointly owned by Scorpan and Tatiana Mihailiuc.

In February 2020, the Moldovan aviation authorities stated that HiSky had not been granted an air operator's certificate due to irregularities found during the certification process, and that an investigation had been launched. One of the issues noted was that Cobrex Trans, the airline which was supposed to operate Airbus A320 aircraft on behalf of HiSky, did not have this aircraft type in its fleet yet. As of 12 May 2020, HiSky was still not licensed for commercial operation, while already selling tickets on its website. The airline obtained its Romanian operating certificate in December 2020 and its Moldovan certificate on 19 February 2021.

On 22 February 2021, HiSky announced its first scheduled routes from Cluj-Napoca to Dublin and Lisbon.

HiSky operated its first commercial flight on 5 March 2021 between Chișinău and Hurghada, Egypt, having delayed its planned 2020 launch multiple times due to the COVID-19 pandemic. From April 2021, the airline expanded its scheduled network with new routes connecting Baia Mare, Chișinău, Frankfurt, Iași, Paris Beauvais and Satu Mare.

In June 2024, HiSky Europe launched a direct service between Bucharest and New York JFK using an Airbus A330, representing the airline's inaugural transatlantic service and the first direct Romania–United States flight in 21 years, after TAROM discontinued the route in 2003.

== Destinations ==
As of June 2026, HiSky operates to the following destinations:

Country	City	Airport	Notes	Refs
Belgium	Brussels	Brussels Airport		
Egypt	Hurghada	Hurghada International Airport	Seasonal Charter	
Egypt	Sharm El Sheikh	Sharm El Sheikh International Airport	Seasonal Charter	
France	Beauvais	Beauvais–Tillé Airport	Focus city	
France	Bordeaux	Bordeaux–Mérignac Airport	Terminated	
France	Paris	Charles de Gaulle Airport		
Germany	Düsseldorf	Düsseldorf Airport		
Germany	Frankfurt	Frankfurt Airport		
Germany	Hamburg	Hamburg Airport		
Ireland	Dublin	Dublin Airport	Focus city	
Israel	Tel Aviv	Ben Gurion Airport		
Italy	Bergamo	Milan Bergamo Airport		
Italy	Venice	Venice Marco Polo Airport		
Moldova	Chișinău	Chișinău Eugen Doga International Airport	Base	
Morocco	Agadir	Agadir–Al Massira Airport	Seasonal Charter	
Portugal	Funchal	Madeira Airport	Seasonal Charter	
Portugal	Lisbon	Lisbon Airport	Terminated	
Romania	Baia Mare	Maramureș Airport		
Romania	Brașov	Brașov-Ghimbav International Airport	Seasonal Charter	
Romania	Bucharest	Bucharest Henri Coandă International Airport	Base	
Romania	Cluj-Napoca	Cluj International Airport		
Romania	Constanța	Mihail Kogălniceanu International Airport	Seasonal Charter	
Romania	Iași	Iași International Airport		
Romania	Oradea	Oradea International Airport		
Romania	Satu Mare	Satu Mare International Airport	Seasonal Charter	
Romania	Târgu Mureș	Târgu Mureș International Airport	Terminated	
Romania	Timișoara	Timișoara Traian Vuia International Airport		
Russia	Moscow	Moscow Domodedovo Airport	Terminated	
Russia	Saint Petersburg	Pulkovo Airport	Terminated	
Spain	Barcelona	Barcelona–El Prat Airport		
Spain	Málaga	Málaga Airport	Terminated	
Spain	Palma de Mallorca	Palma de Mallorca Airport	Seasonal Charter	
Spain	Tenerife	Tenerife South Airport	Seasonal Charter	
Tunisia	Monastir	Habib Bourguiba International Airport	Seasonal Charter	
Turkey	Antalya	Antalya Airport	Seasonal Charter	
Turkey	Istanbul	Istanbul Airport		
United Kingdom	London	London Stansted Airport		
United States	New York City	John F. Kennedy International Airport		

== Fleet ==
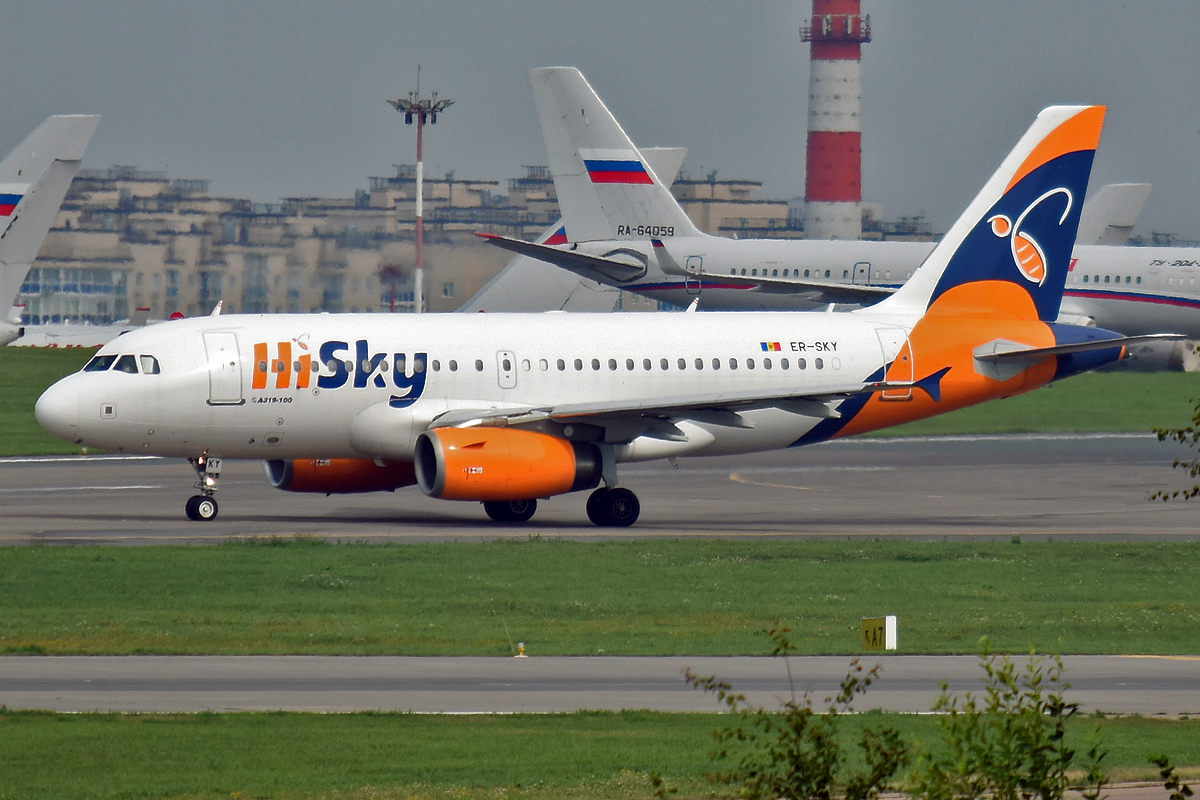
HiSky Airbus A319-100

As of August 2025, HiSky operates an all-Airbus fleet composed of the following aircraft:

HiSky fleet
Aircraft	In service	Orders	Passengers			Notes
Aircraft	In service	Orders	C	Y	Total	Notes
Airbus A319-100	1	—	—	144	144	
Total	1	—				

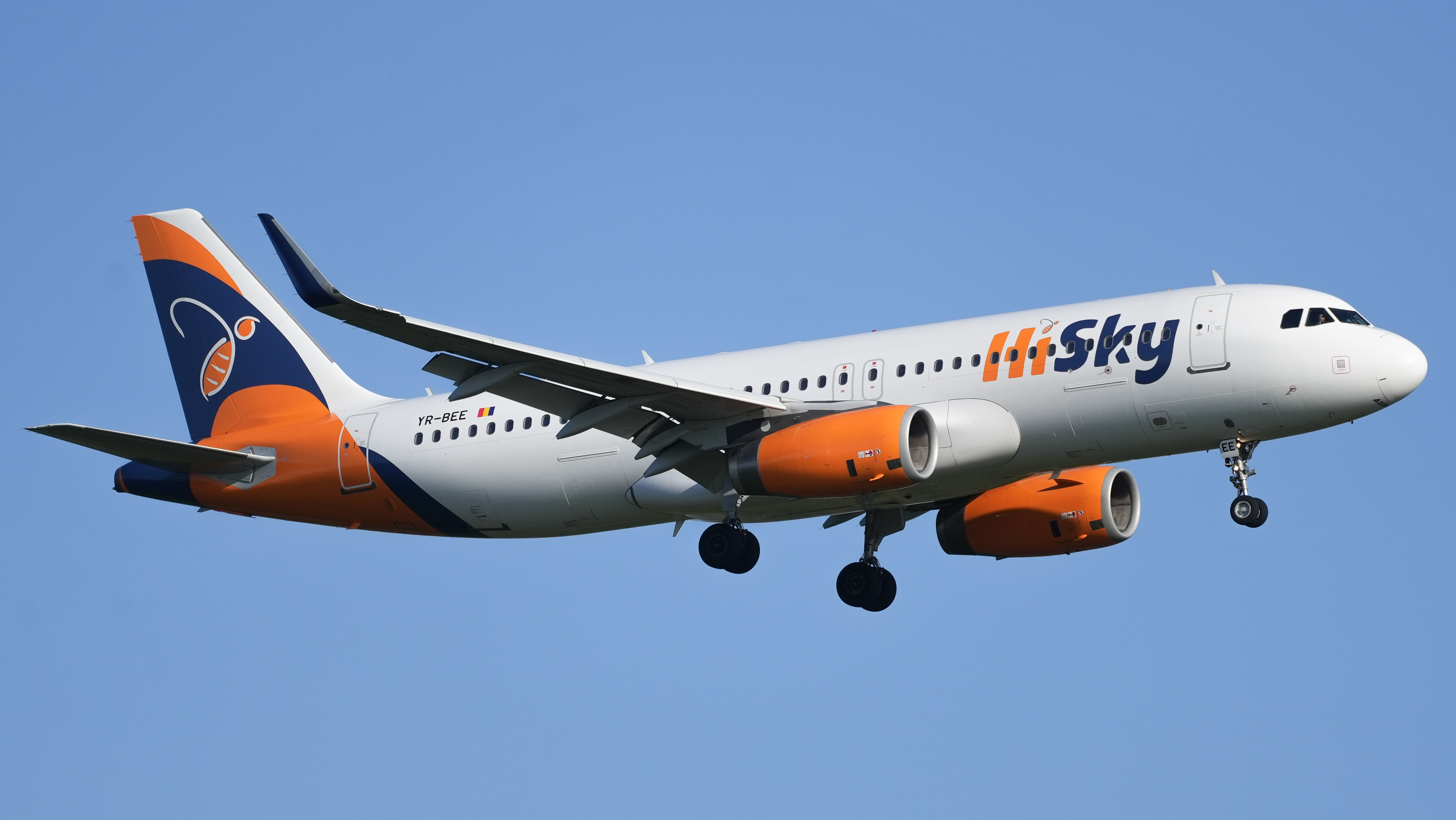
HiSky Europe Airbus A320-200

As of August 2025, HiSky Europe operates an all-Airbus fleet composed of the following aircraft:

HiSky Europe fleet
Aircraft	In service	Orders	Passengers			Notes
Aircraft	In service	Orders	C	Y	Total	Notes
Airbus A320-200	4	—	—	180	180	
Airbus A321LR	2	—	—	220	220	
Airbus A330-200	1	—	24	250	274	
Total	7	—				
