= Timișoara Traian Vuia International Airport =

Timișoara Traian Vuia International Airport Aeroportul Internațional „Traian Vuia” Timișoara

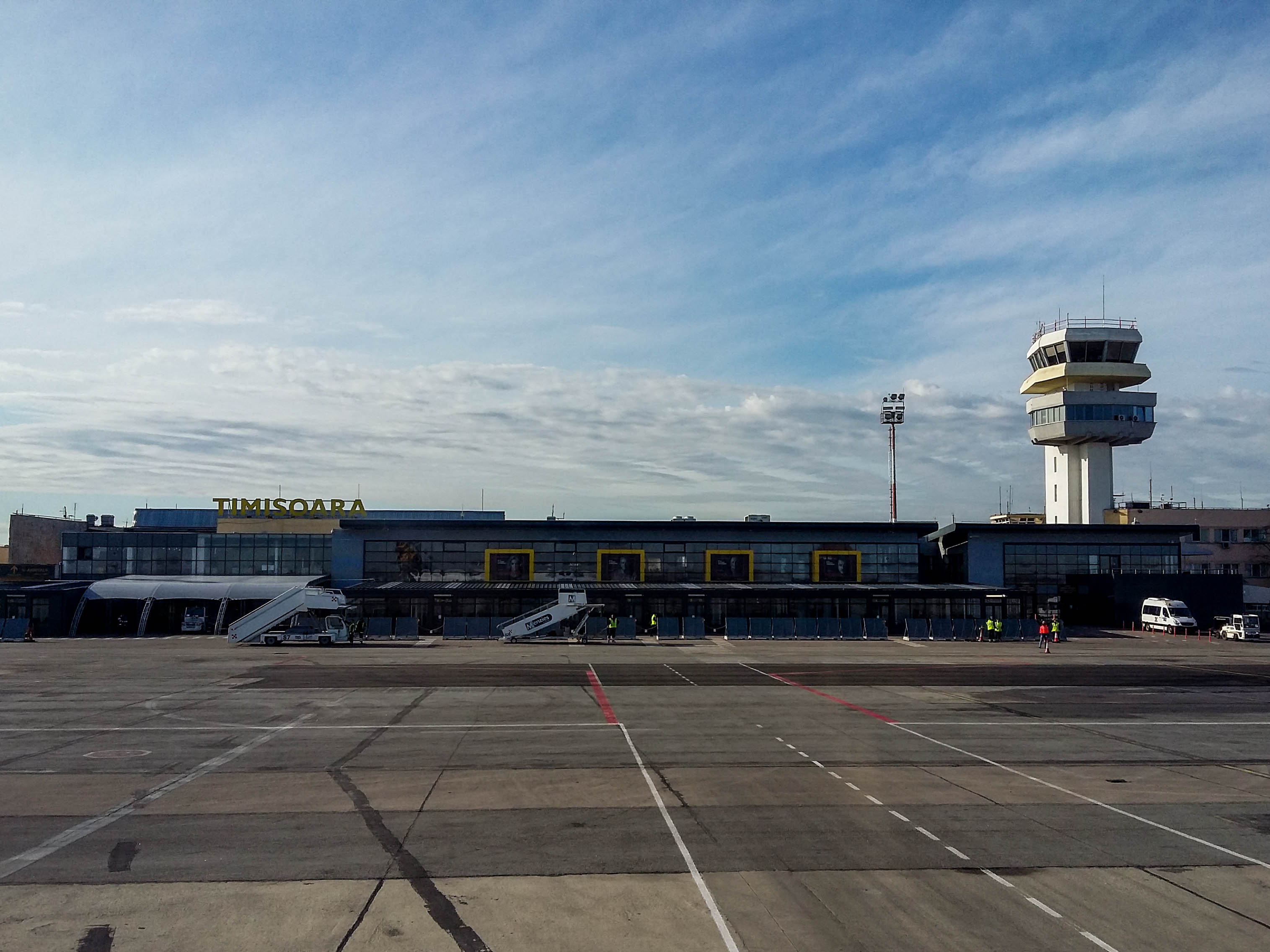
- IATA: TSR; ICAO: LRTR

Summary
- Airport type: Public
- Owner: Ministry of Transport and Infrastructure
- Operator: Romanian Civil Aeronautical Authority
- Serves: Timișoara
- Location: Ghiroda, Timiș County
- Opened: 28 February 1964
- Hub for: Animawings; Wizz Air
- Time zone: EET (+2)
  - Summer (DST): EEST (+3)
- Elevation AMSL: 106 m (348 ft)
- Coordinates: 45°48′36″N 21°20′17″E
- Website: aerotim.ro

Map
- Location within Romania Location within Europe

Runways
| Direction | Length | | Surface |
| Direction | m | ft | Surface |
|---|---|---|---|
| 11/29 | 3,500 | 11,483 | Asphalt |

Statistics (2025)
- Passengers: 1,458,098 ▲
- Aircraft movements: 16,332 ▲
- Cargo: 6,405 t ▼
- Source: AIP at the Romanian Airports Association (RAA)

Timișoara Traian Vuia International Airport (IATA: TSR, ICAO: LRTR) is an international airport serving Timișoara, Romania. Located in the historical region of Banat, the airport is named in honor of Traian Vuia, a Romanian flight pioneer and a Timiș County native. It is the fourth-busiest Romanian airport in terms of air traffic and the main air transportation hub for the western part of Romania and for the Danube–Criș–Mureș–Tisa Euroregion.

Timișoara Airport is one of the four airports in Romania that has a runway longer than 3 km (the other three are Henri Coandă Intl. and Aurel Vlaicu Intl. in Bucharest and Mihail Kogălniceanu Intl. in Constanța). It serves as an operating base for Wizz Air and is considered a backup airport for Belgrade (BEG), Bucharest (OTP) and Budapest (BUD).

== Name ==
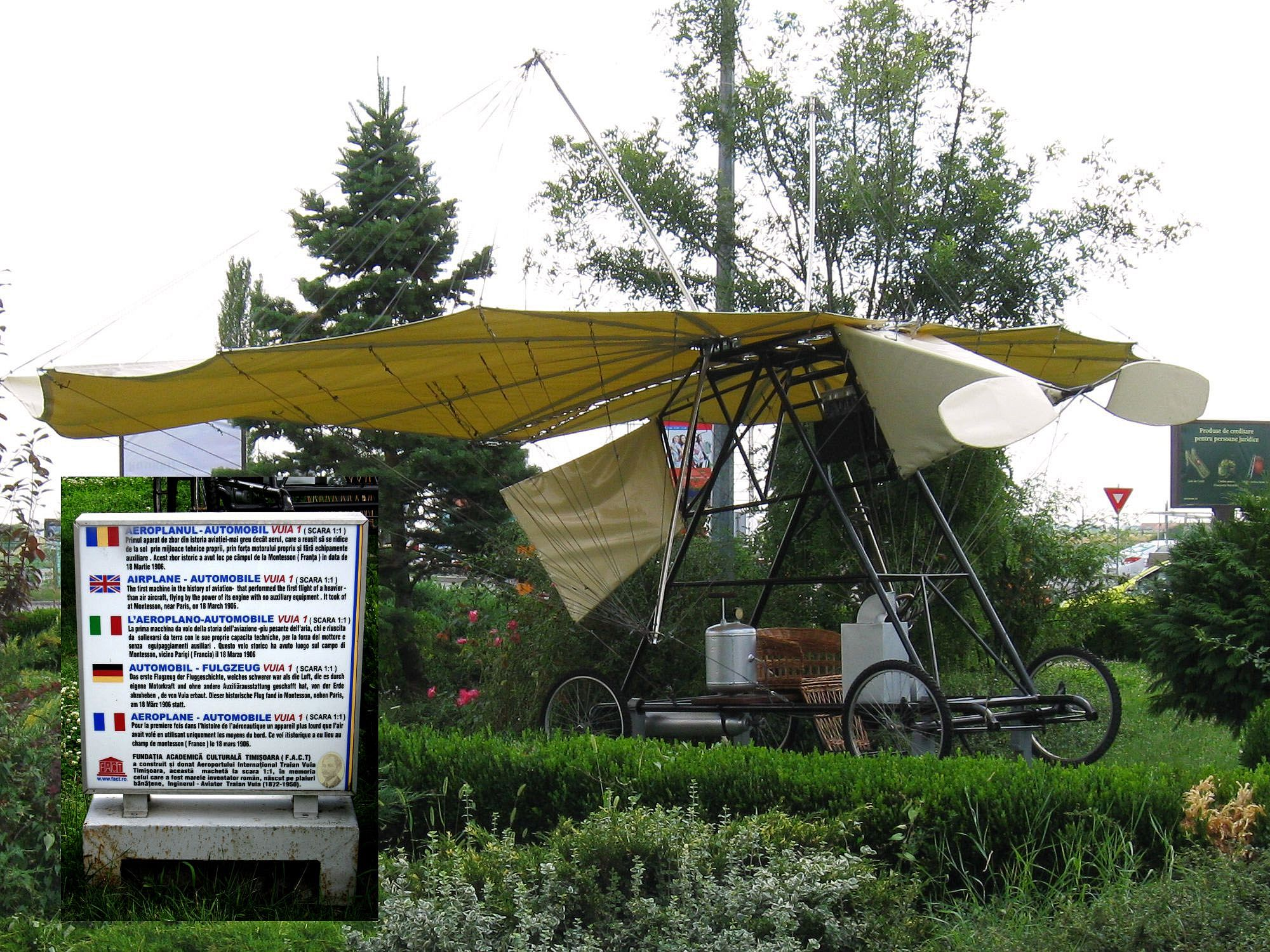
Timișoara Airport is named after Romanian flight pioneer Traian Vuia (1872–1950). A model of his airplane-automobile Vuia 1 is on display at the airport.

Timișoara Airport has had several names over time. At its beginnings it was called Timișoara Communal Airport. During the communist period, it was called Giarmata Airport, after the name of the village with which it borders. It received its current name on 6 February 2003.

== Location ==
The airport is located 12 km northeast of the center of Timișoara, located in the homonymous district (Aeroport) and borders Giarmata-Vii, a component village of the commune of Ghiroda. Access to the airport is made on European route E70.

== History ==
=== 1915–1917: Base for German zeppelins ===
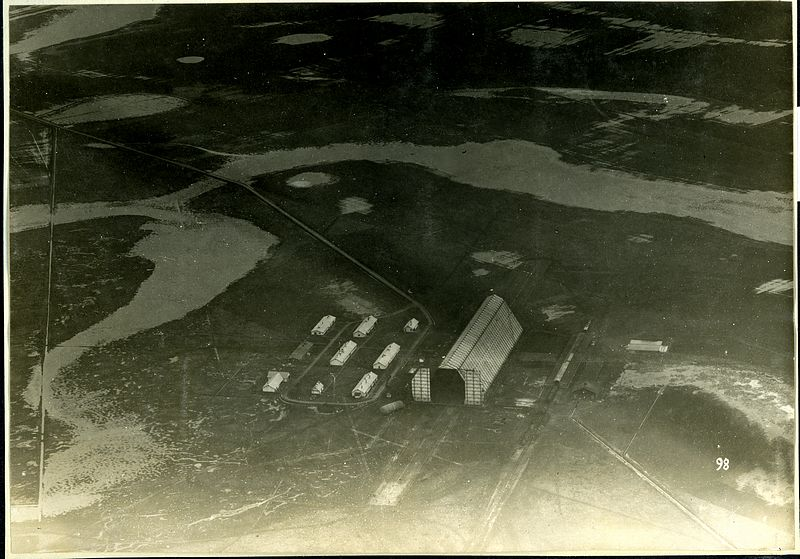
Zeppelin base near Dudeștii Noi and Sânandrei c. 1916

The first air base in Timiș County was operational between November 1915 and April 1917, on the communal grassland of Dudeștii Noi and Sânandrei. It was a German military air base, used for stationing, loading and repairing zeppelins. It featured access roads and railway lines for transport to the base, barracks for technical and navigational staff, a Telefunken radio station, a hydrogen production facility, and a massive hangar measuring 180 meters in length and 34 meters in width. The hangar was constructed on a metal frame with a triangular cross-section.

During World War I, zeppelins erected from the base in Dudeștii Noi bombed Bucharest, Ploiești, Chișinău and Thessaloniki. After the closure of this air base, in 1919, the villagers tried to dismantle it piece by piece, but the metal framework of the hall that once housed the German zeppelins collapsed on them, and five people died.

=== 1935: First civil airport ===
Timișoara's first civil airport was put into use on 10 July 1935, based on a telegraphic order of the Ministry of Interior. It was located on the training ground of the Military Garrison, approximately on the current site of Iulius Town. The first aircraft landed here on 17 July 1935. The official inauguration of the temporary airport took place on 20 July 1935. At the time of its establishment, it had no material endowment. The airport's technical building was made of planks and tarred cardboard and had three rooms and a stove. One room was for the commander, another for the traffic and administrative offices, and the third room served as a waiting room.

On 27 July 1936, following a protocol concluded between the authorities and the airport commander, it was decided to allocate a fund of approximately 5 million lei for the construction of a definitive airport. The money was destined for the construction of a terminal, a hangar and two other buildings that were to serve as radio and telegraph stations, located in the Cioca plainfield. The winner of the auction was the firm of architectural engineer August Schmiedigen from Bucharest, for the amount of 4.5 million lei. During the project, flights to and from Timișoara were further taken over by the temporary airport. On 23 September 1936, the first excavations were carried out at the foundations. The construction of the terminal was completed in 1938, lacking the connections to electricity, telephone, water, sewage, etc. The construction of radio and telegraph stations was completed in the same period, lacking only the necessary equipment. The auction was deemed suspicious, reason why the Superior Administrative Court annulled its adjudication and, consequently, decided to suspend the works.

In 1941, the airport administration relocated to the Cioca plainfield, and flights also took place here. Until its dissolution in 1864–1865, the village of Cioca, known in Hungarian as Csoka, was located on the site of the airport. Due to difficulties in financing the works and the improper soil (clay soil, standing water), the project of relocating the airport was abandoned, and the structures already built were ceded to the Central Meteorological Institute. The Cioca Airfield is used today by owners of recreational aircraft, as well as by utility aviation.

Since 1942, the airport has operated on a 91-hectare plot of land in Moșnița Nouă. The land was used by the airport based on a protocol declaring it an area of military interest. The runway had a maximum length of 1,200 m and a width of 600 m. As of 1944, there was a 9 × 5-meter plank cabin with three rooms: a commander's office, a weather office and a registry, administration and archive office. There were also a plank shed covered with makeshift tiles and a 20 × 8-meter shack, brought from Deta. It had no radio or telephone, and the lighting consisted of 27 oil lamps.

=== 1976–1989: First external flights ===
Between 1952 and 1953, the construction and commissioning of the runway for the needs of the Military Aviation Unit near Giarmata-Vii took place. In the 1960s, Timișoara became an increasingly important economic center, so the decision was made to build a large civil airport on its current location, between the communes of Giarmata, Ghiroda and Remetea Mare. The domestic terminal was inaugurated on 28 February 1964. Between 1964 and 1965, the runway was extended by 500 m (from 2,000 m to 2,500 m).

In the mid-1970s, the Bucharest administration decided to modernize the Timișoara Airport. As the airport at that time could not meet the strategic military needs (its location at the western border of Romania), but also the increase in the number of passengers and civil air traffic (the introduction of international flights was desired), the decision was made to modernize and expand the airport by a state decree in 1976. Between 1977 and 1979, during the works, the air traffic in the area was taken over by Arad Airport, the transport of passengers from Arad to Timișoara and back being carried out with Timișoara Airport's own means. During this period, the runway was extended from 2,500 m to 3,500 m, and the international terminal, the control tower, the official lounge and the administrative building were inaugurated. Passenger and cargo flights began on 20 September 1979. International flights began a year later, on 1 November 1980. In the 1980s, passengers had six weekly flights to Bucharest and two weekly flights to Constanța and back. Between 1986 and 1989 there were two weekly flights to and from Frankfurt. During certain periods of this decade, Timișoara was connected by direct flights to Chicago and New York, one flight per week. Timișoara Airport was the first commercial destination of flights made with the only passenger jet aircraft produced in Romania, ROMBAC 1-11. This flight took place on 28 January 1983, on the Bucharest–Timișoara route.

Timișoara Airport was under siege during the 1989 Revolution. TABs were placed at each gate, and buses carrying passengers or employees were carefully checked by militiamen. The airport became an extremely important spot, with a large deployment of forces. During the days of the Revolution, generals, ministers and delegates sent here from Bucharest by the presidential couple Nicolae and Elena Ceaușescu to repress the Revolution passed through here.

=== After 1989: Extension and modernization works ===
The gradual economic liberalization after the revolution and the commencement of some external flights, towards the West, opened new opportunities both for the population in the area and the foreign investors. Between 1993 and 1995, major repairs were made to the runway. In 1998, the storage hall for cargo and express courier services was inaugurated, Timișoara Airport thus becoming a freight transport hub.

Between 2000 and 2001, major repairs were carried out to the movement surfaces (runway, apron and taxiway) and the lighting system. The domestic terminal was modernized in 2002, and the transit terminal was inaugurated on 19 May 2003, connecting important cities in Romania with cities in Italy and Germany. In November 2003, however, TAROM ended its route from Bucharest to New York via Timișoara. The international terminal was expanded and modernized in 2004. Between 2005 and 2009, a third runway was built, and the apron was expanded by about 30%. Between 2007 and 2008, works were carried out to extend the terminal for domestic and international flights, the airport area increasing by 30%.

In 2017, Timișoara International Airport became the first Romanian airport to be certified by the European Aviation Safety Agency.

In July 2021, a new external arrivals terminal was inaugurated, followed by a new departures terminal in March 2024, with the goal being to support a flow of about three million passengers per year.

=== Future developments ===
An 8-kilometer road connecting the Timișoara Airport and A1 will be built to shorten the distance between the airport and the motorway and reduce heavy traffic in Ghiroda and Remetea Mare. In 2021, Timiș County Council took over an area of about 46 ha of land for the construction of an intermodal freight center at Timișoara Airport and its subsequent connection to the regional intermodal freight center in Remetea Mare. There are plans for an airport city through which will be built, in addition to air transport facilities, connecting road and rail transport infrastructure, hotels, restaurants, shops, conference centers and exhibition halls. It is planned to be financed with both public and private funds.

== Military use ==
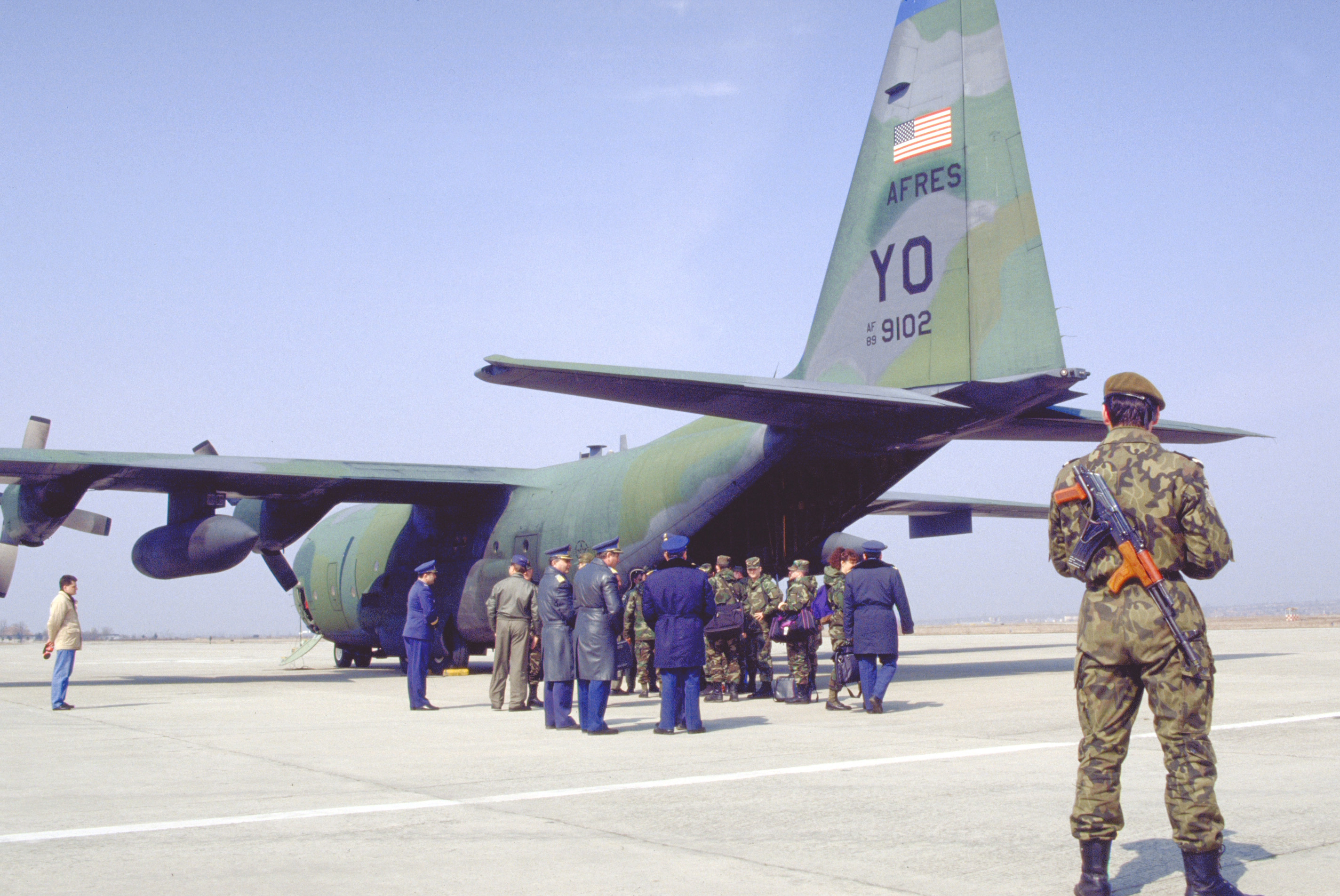
A C-130 Hercules of the US Air Force Reserve at the Timișoara Air Base in 1996

Giarmata Airport was home to the Romanian Air Force 93rd Air Base, founded in 1953. The 93rd Air Base was disbanded in September 2004 with the MiG-21 Lancers and IAR 330 moving to Câmpia Turzii for reassignment to the 71st Air Base. Buildings and land belonging to the former 93rd Air Base, totaling 240 ha, were transferred to Timișoara Airport in 2006. The air base also operated the MiG-23 Flogger, which was retired in early 2002. Over 30 MiG-23s are in storage at Timișoara Airport. Nowadays, the military section of the airport is an annex of the 71st Air Base.

== Terminals ==
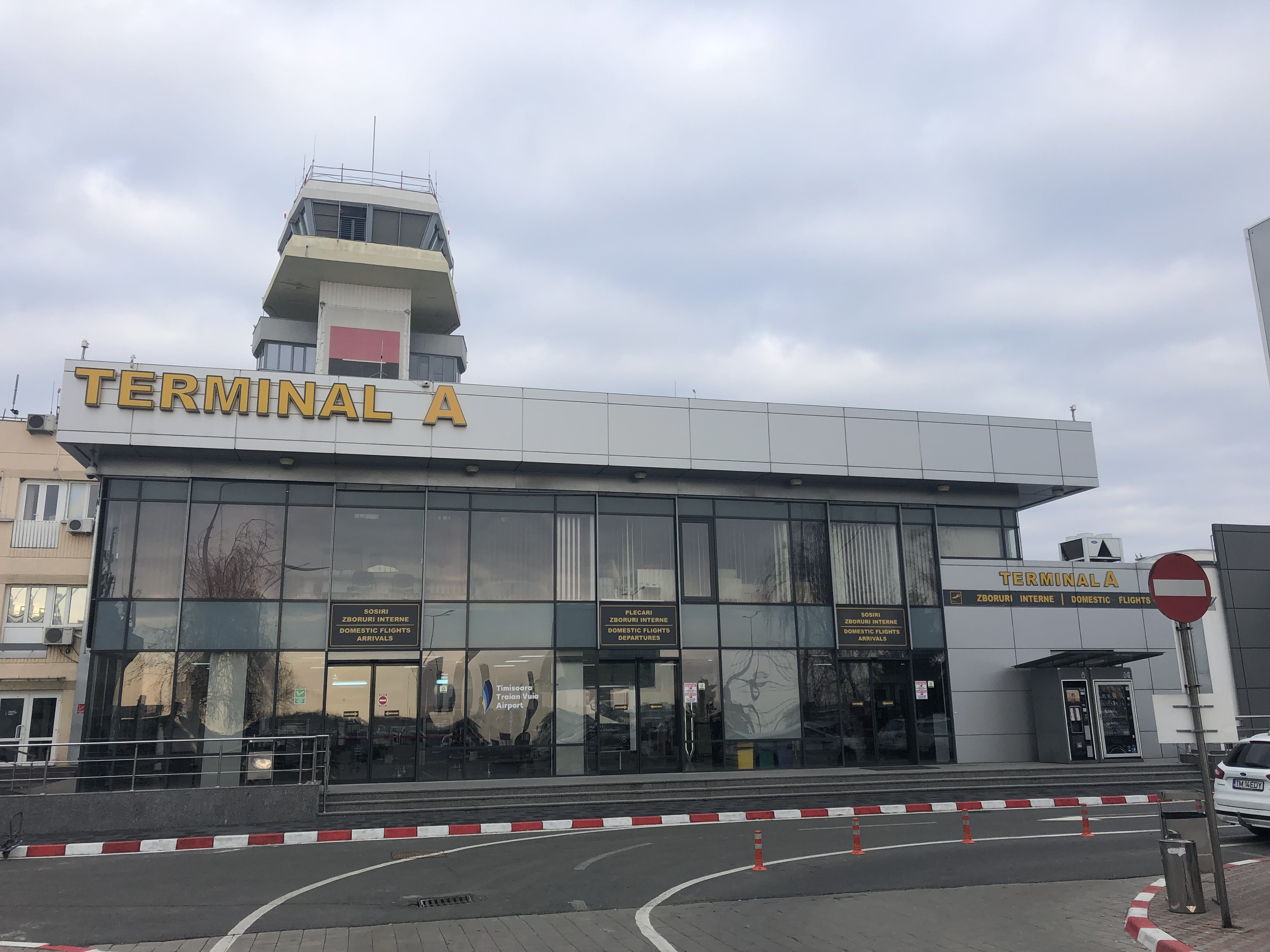
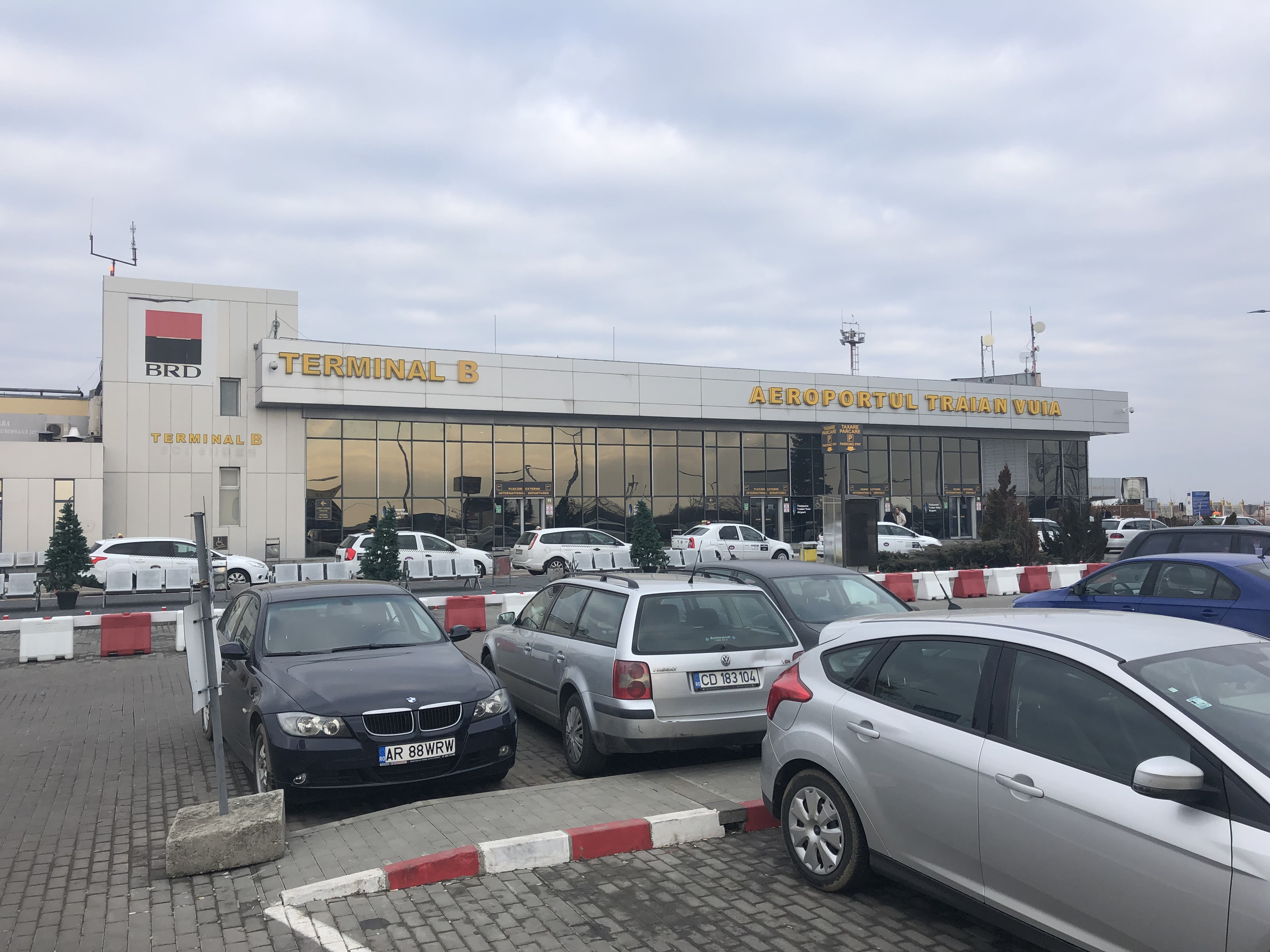
Terminal A (left) and Terminal B (right) in February 2019

Terminal A is the oldest terminal, built in 1964 and modernized in 2002. The initial construction was small, but at the end of 2010 the area of the terminal doubled by the inauguration of its extension (2,000 m^{2}). The expansion was necessary due to the increase in traffic, but also for the separation of passenger flows. The terminal was dedicated to flights to non-Schengen destinations, with an estimated annual traffic of 180,000 passengers. It also operated as a terminal for domestic flights, and had a processing capacity of 500 passengers per hour and three boarding gates. This is where most Romanian airlines operated, at the time.

Terminal B was inaugurated in 1980, then expanded and modernized in 2004. It was the largest terminal, with a processing capacity of 800 passengers per hour and nine boarding gates. At the same time, it was the terminal from which most companies operated.

On 29 July 2021, a new external arrivals terminal was inaugurated. Groundbreaking for the new terminal took place in 2019. It covers an area of 4,383 m^{2} and is optimized for three passenger flows, with three baggage check-in conveyors, 10 document checkpoints and three customs checkpoints.

A new 12,000 m^{2} departures terminal (dedicated to Schengen flights) was inaugurated in March 2024. The capacity of the airport increased by 150% as eight new boarding gates, 20 check-ins and 10 document checkpoints were built. Alongside there are six new security checkpoints, shopping and catering facilities.

== Airlines and destinations ==
The following airlines operate regular scheduled and charter flights at Timișoara Traian Vuia Airport:

| Airlines | Destinations |
|---|---|
| Animawings | Athens, Bucharest–Otopeni, Dubai–Al Maktoum, Istanbul, Rotterdam; Seasonal: Chania, Corfu, Heraklion, Kavala, Kefalonia, Olbia, Palma de Mallorca, Rhodes, Tenerife–South, Thessaloniki, Zakynthos |
| Corendon Airlines | Seasonal charter: Antalya |
| Freebird Airlines | Seasonal charter: Antalya |
| HiSky | Bucharest–Otopeni; Seasonal charter: Hurghada, Larnaca |
| Lufthansa City Airlines | Munich |
| Pegasus Airlines | Seasonal charter: Antalya |
| Sky Express | Seasonal charter: Heraklion, Patras, Rhodes |
| SunExpress | Seasonal: Antalya |
| TAROM | Bucharest–Otopeni; Seasonal charter: Antalya, Hurghada |
| Turkish Airlines | Istanbul |
| Wizz Air | Barcelona, Bari, Basel/Mulhouse, Beauvais, Bergamo, Berlin, Bologna, Charleroi, Dortmund, Hahn, Karlsruhe/Baden-Baden, Larnaca, London–Luton, Madrid, Memmingen, Naples, Nuremberg, Prague, Rome–Ciampino, Treviso, Valencia; Seasonal: Zakynthos |

== Statistics ==
=== Development ===
The airport's traffic rose significantly in recent years. For example, in 2016 there were an average of 40–45 aircraft movements per day and an average of 3,200 passengers, compared to 2005 when there were an average of 15–20 flights per day and an average of 1,500 passengers. The main destinations at the airport are Bucharest, London, Munich, Milan and Brussels.

Although it experienced a dramatic decrease after the bankruptcy of Carpatair, the negative trend reversed by 2015 when Wizz Air decided to allocate a new aircraft to the base at Timișoara Airport and open six more new routes. In terms of domestic traffic, Timișoara Airport attracts 15.1% of the total number of passengers boarded at Romanian airports, 32.8% of the total tons of cargo loaded and 13.2% of the total number of flights.

=== Traffic figures ===
Annual passenger, aircraft and cargo statistics
| Year | Passengers (% change from prior year) | Aircraft movements (% change from prior year) | Cargo (tones, % change from prior year) |
|---|---|---|---|
| 2006 | 753,934 | 24,817 | - |
| 2007 | 836,574(▲11.0%) | 25,379(▲2.3%) | - |
| 2008 | 890,704(▲6.5%) | 24,768(▼2.4%) | - |
| 2009 | 973,873(▲9.3%) | 24,815(▲0.2%) | - |
| 2010 | 1,138,431(▲16.9%) | 25,807(▲4.0%) | - |
| 2011 | 1,200,762(▲5.5%) | 23,214(▼10.0%) | - |
| 2012 | 1,035,929(−13.7%) | 18,522(▼20.2%) | - |
| 2013 | 757,069(−26.9%) | 11,929(▼35.6%) | - |
| 2014 | 734,568(−3.0%) | 10,255(▼14.0%) | 1,898 |
| 2015 | 923,570(▲25.7%) | 11,997(▲17.0%) | 2,594(▲36.7%) |
| 2016 | 1,160,167(▲25.6%) | 14,158(▲18.0%) | 3,868(▲49.1%) |
| 2017 | 1,621,529(▲39.8%) | 17,808(▲25.8%) | 4,586(▲18.6%) |
| 2018 | 1,517,309(▼6.4%) | 17,224(▼3.3%) | 5,939(▲29.5%) |
| 2019 | 1,595,012(▲5.1%) | 17,476(▲1.5%) | 5,167(▼13.0%) |
| 2020 | 470,486(▼70.5%) | 10,180(▼41.7%) | 5,148(▼0.4%) |
| 2021 | 639,532(▲35.9%) | - | 6,068(▲17.9%) |
| 2022 | 1,193,923(▲86.7%) | 15,206 | 7,817(▲28%) |
| 2023 | 1,354,859(▲13.5%) | 16,418(▲8.0%) | 6,639(▼15.1%) |
| 2024 | 1,323,690(▼2.3%) | 15,568(▼5.2%) | 7,094(▲6.9%) |
| 2025 | 1,458,098(▲10.2%) | 16,332(▲4.9%) | 6,405(▼9.7%) |

Busiest routes from TSR by number of passengers
| Airport | Passengers (2019) | Airline(s) |
|---|---|---|
| Bucharest | 422,201 | Blue Air, Ryanair, TAROM |
| Memmingen | 193,504 | Wizz Air |
| Milan–Bergamo | 179,382 | Ryanair, Wizz Air |
| London–Luton | 143,974 | Wizz Air |
| Frankfurt | 78,672 | Lufthansa |

Busiest routes from TSR by number of flights per week
| Destination | Airport | Frequency (2026) | Airline(s) |
|---|---|---|---|
| Bucharest | Henri Coandă Intl. | 45 | Animawings, HiSky, TAROM |
| Munich | Munich Airport | 14 | Lufthansa |
| Istanbul | Istanbul Airport | 7 | Animawings, Turkish Airlines |
| London | Luton | 7 | Wizz Air |
| Milan | Orio al Serio Intl. | 7 | Wizz Air |
| Dortmund | Dortmund | 4 | Wizz Air |
| Memmingen | Memmingen | 4 | Wizz Air |

== Ground transportation ==
=== Car ===
Access to the airport is via Calea Dorobanților and the European route E70, through a roundabout near the village of Ghiroda. A slightly longer alternative (but with less traffic flow) is to exit Timișoara on Calea Dorobanților and drive through the village of Giarmata-Vii instead, before heading back towards the airport. A third option, starting in the northern part of the city, is to use the ring road (DNCT) which, also through a roundabout, is connected with the road to the airport.

Taxi cabs have dedicated parking in front of the terminals. Ride-sharing services are not acknowledged by the airport, however the parking lot can be crossed on foot in a few minutes, and a car can be ordered at the entrance.

Several rent-a-car services (Avis, Europcar, Budget, Hertz, etc.) operate within the airport. The rental counters are located in the public area, their schedule being correlated with the flight schedule.

=== Bus ===
The STPT Express 4 line (E4) connects the terminals to the city center. The bus runs approximately every 30 minutes on weekdays, and less frequently on weekends. Since 13 September 2012, the Express 4 barat line (~~E4~~) connects the airport directly with Timișoara North railway station, the main station in the city. However, this bus only runs a few times per day, to connect the more important flights. Paper tickets can be purchased inside the airport. One ticket costs 4 lei and permits travel for up to one hour after the start of the ride.

| Operator | Line | Destination | Route | Schedule |
|---|---|---|---|---|
| STPT | E4 | Bastion | Ghiroda (DN6)–Badea Cârțan Market–Bastion | Every 30–60 min. |
| STPT | E4 barat | Gheorghe Barițiu Street | Ghiroda (DN6)–Badea Cârțan Market–Bastion–700 Square–North Station | Every 90 min. |

=== Rail ===
There are plans for a new 5.2-kilometer railway between the East Station and the airport. A train station and a road leading to the airport should be built in its vicinity. Upon completion, the airport will become the second airport in Romania with dedicated rail line, after Henri Coandă International (inaugurated in 2020). Currently, there is a spur line which runs to the airport, but it is only used by Military Unit 01930 for fuel transportation.

== See also ==
- List of airports in Romania
- Aviation in Romania
- Transport in Romania
