= Suceava Ștefan cel Mare International Airport =

Airport in Romania

Suceava Ștefan cel Mare International Airport Aeroportul Internațional "Ștefan cel Mare" Suceava

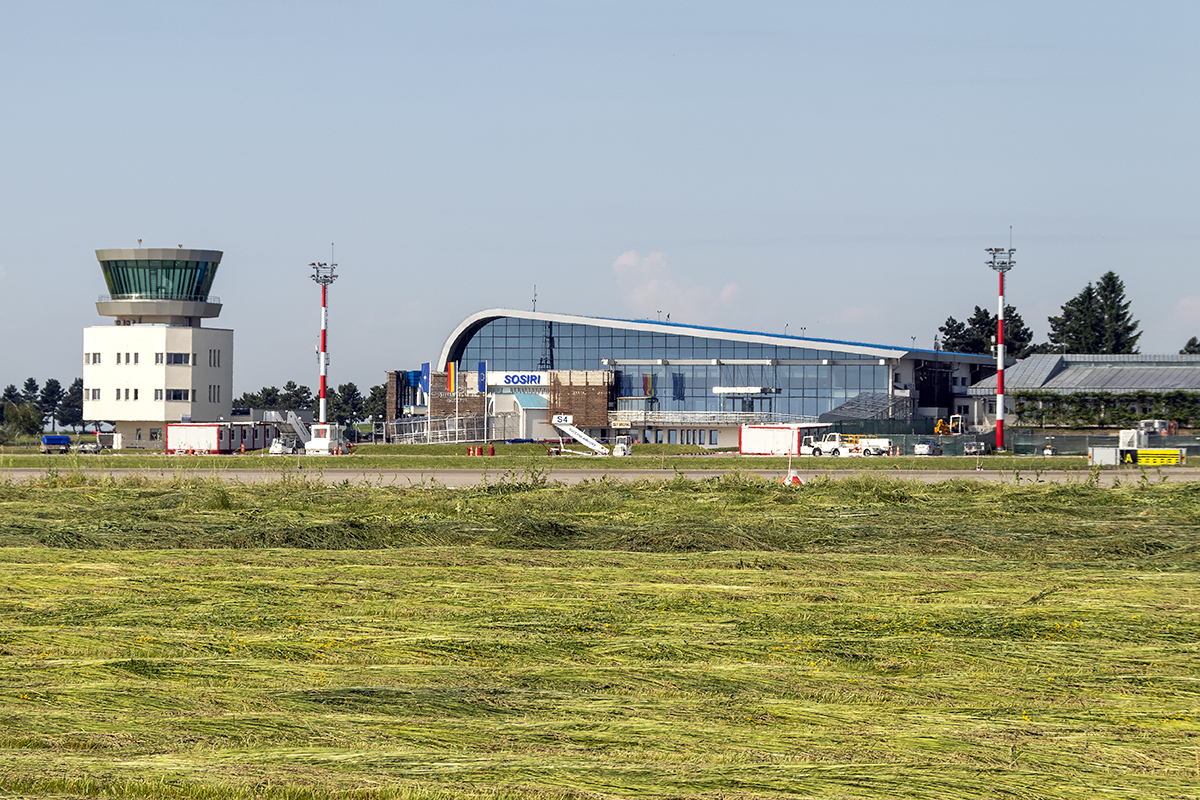
- IATA: SCV; ICAO: LRSV

Summary
- Airport type: Public
- Operator: Suceava County Council
- Serves: Suceava, Romania
- Location: Salcea
- Opened: 1962; 64 years ago
- Elevation AMSL: 419 m (1,375 ft)
- Coordinates: 47°41′15″N 026°21′15″E
- Website: www.aeroportsuceava.ro

Map
- Location of airport in Romania

Runways
Direction	Length		Surface
Direction	m	ft	Surface
16/34	2,460	8,071	Asphalt

Statistics (2025)
- Passengers: 769,408 ▲
- Aircraft movements: 7,052 ▲
- Source: AIP at the Romanian Airports Association (RAA)

Suceava Ștefan cel Mare International Airport (IATA: SCV, ICAO: LRSV) is an airport serving the city of Suceava, Romania. It is located in Salcea, 12 km (7.5 mi) east of Suceava, and 30.5 km (19.0 mi) west of Botoșani. The airport is named in honour of the Prince of Moldavia Stephen the Great.

== History ==
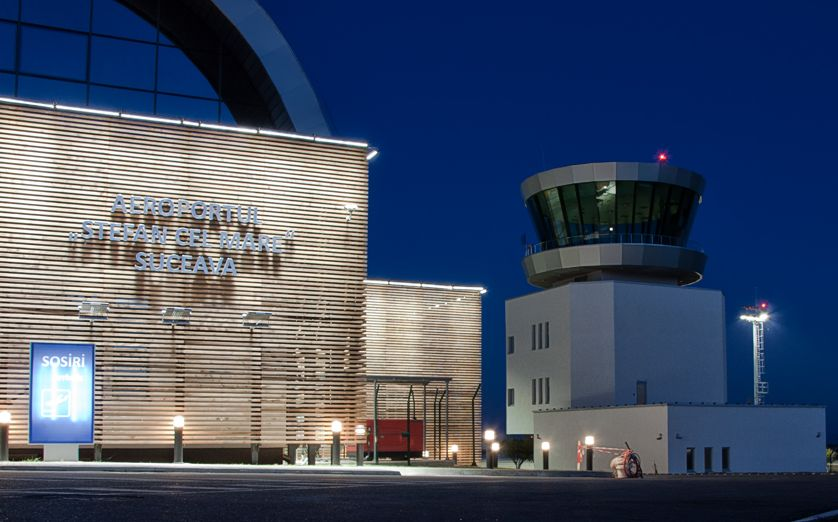
Suceava Ștefan cel Mare International Airport - new TWR and main terminal building in 2015.

Suceava Airport, more popularly known as Salcea Airport, opened in 1962 when the first commercial services started with TAROM. In 1963, the runway was paved, and an apron was built. Services by TAROM were discontinued in 2001 but resumed in 2004. During this absence, the airport was served only by Angel Airlines. In March 2005, the airport was renamed Ștefan cel Mare Airport, and opened to international traffic.

In 2013, Suceava International Airport started a plan (estimated at €39 million) to rebuild and extend the old runway of 1,800 m (5,906 ft), to build a new control tower and to install a new ILS system. In August 2013, the construction work began, and on 12 January 2014, the airport closed to allow the runway works to continue. The old concrete runway was completely removed, and replaced by an asphalt runway. On 25 October 2015, the airport was officially reopened.

== Facilities ==
The airport resides at an elevation of 1,375 feet (419 m) above mean sea level. It has one asphalt runway, designated 16/34 and measuring 2,460 by 45 metres (8,071 ft × 148 ft), and six parking stands.

== Airlines and destinations ==
The following airlines operate regular scheduled and charter flights at Suceava Airport:

Airlines	Destinations
Animawings	Bucharest–Otopeni; Seasonal: Heraklion
Sky Express	Seasonal charter: Heraklion
SkyUp Airlines	Seasonal charter: Sharm el-Sheikh
TAROM	Bucharest–Otopeni
Wizz Air	Bergamo, Birmingham, Bologna, Charleroi, Dortmund, Karlsruhe/Baden-Baden, Larnaca, London–Luton, Memmingen, Milan–Malpensa, Rome–Fiumicino, Treviso

== Statistics ==
Year	Passengers	% change	Aircraft movements	% change
2005	7,734	—N/a	495	—N/a
2006	12,766	65.1% ▲	801	61.8% ▲
2007	20,792	62.9% ▲	1,092	36.3% ▲
2008	23,398	12.5% ▲	1,036	5.1% ▼
2009	32,561	39.2% ▲	1,654	59.7% ▲
2010	34,437	5.8% ▲	1.556	5.9% ▼
2011	27,208	21.0% ▼	1,063	31.7% ▼
2012	25,143	7.6% ▼	948	10.8% ▼
2013	20,054	20.2% ▼	1,319	39.1% ▲
2014	219	98.9% ▼	34	97.4% ▼
2015	2,359	977.1% ▲	170	500.0% ▲
2016	57,226	2,325.8% ▲	1,783	948.8% ▲
2017	262,165	358.1% ▲	3,069	72.1% ▲
2018	353,280	34.75% ▲	3,446	12.3% ▲
2019	430,123	21.8% ▲		▲
2020	189,199	56.0% ▼		▼
2021	346,697	83.2% ▲	4,421	▲
2022	763,969	120.3% ▲	7,755	75.4% ▲
2023	802,167	5.0% ▲	8,138	5.0% ▲
2024	746,600	6.9% ▼	6,904	17.8% ▼
2025	769,408	3.05% ▲	7,070	2.40% ▲

== Ground transportation ==
There is a road linking the airport to DN29 (part of the European route E58), the main road between Suceava and Botoșani. It can also be reached from Ukraine by road.

== See also ==
- Aviation in Romania
- List of airports in Romania
- Transport in Romania
