= Luftwaffe raid on Poltava =

Luftwaffe raid on Poltava 1944
- Part of Strategic bombing during World War II
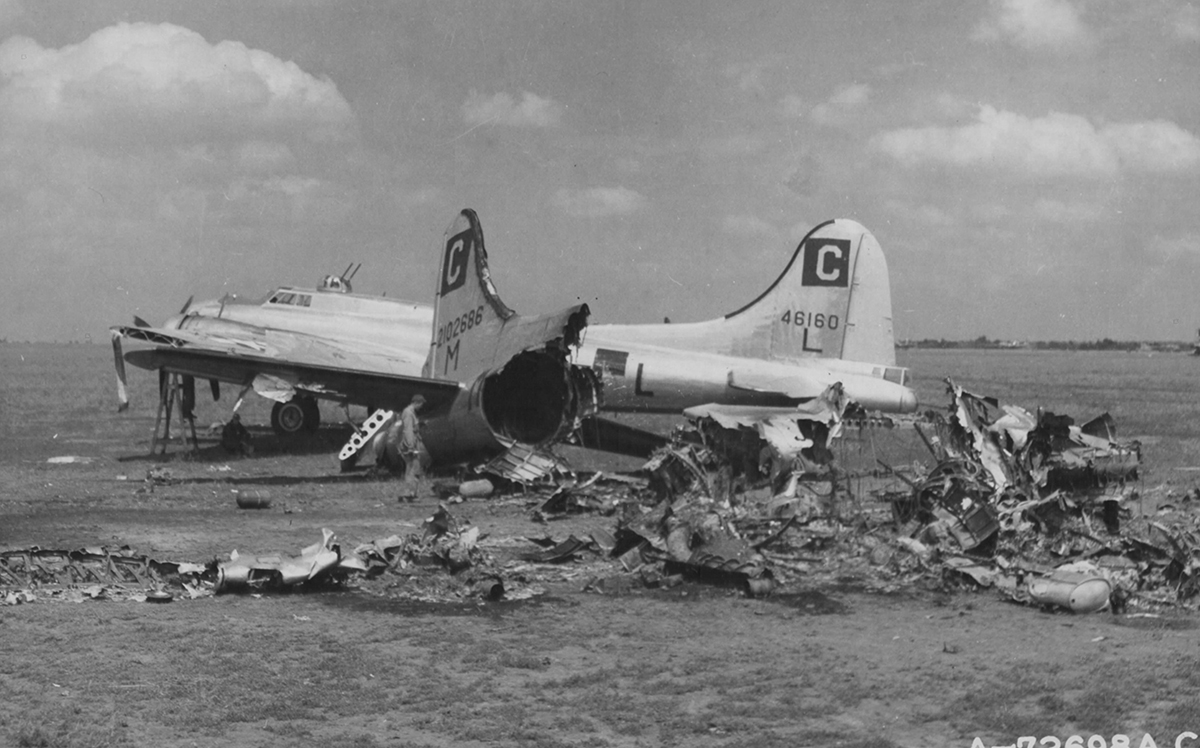
- Destroyed B-17s on Poltava Airfield
Date	22 June 1944
Location	Poltava, Soviet Union
Result	German victory

Belligerents
Germany	United States; Soviet Union

Commanders and leaders
(Nazi Germany) Rudolf Meister (Nazi Germany) Wilhelm Antrup	(United States) Alfred A. Kessler (United States) Archie J. Old Jr. (Soviet Union) Alexei R. Perminov

Casualties and losses
0-1 aircraft destroyed (Note: Most sources say no German aircraft got lost. One contemporary source says one Ju-88 got shot down some time during the return flight.)	(United States) ~50 aircraft destroyed ~20-30 damaged (Note: Numbers vary between sources. In general every B-17 got hit and between 44 to 50 were written off. A few additional support aircraft accompanying the bomber force were also hit.); 8 soldiers wounded or dead (Soviet Union) 25 aircraft destroyed or damaged 75 soldiers wounded or dead

The Luftwaffe raid on Poltava (German: Unternehmen Zaunkönig), was an air attack carried out by German bombers against Allied forces at Poltava Air Base on 22 June 1944, during World War II. Allied bombing forces were conducting long range shuttle raids as part of Operation Frantic, departing from airfields in Western Europe and landing in Soviet-controlled territory. On 21 June, following another successful shuttle bombing mission, designated FRANTIC II, German aircraft tracked the Allied bombers to their destination airfield and assembled a strike force to attack them.

In the early hours of 22 June, the German forces took the recently landed Allied air forces by surprise and bombarded Poltava Air Base inflicting heavy losses. Facing only ineffective resistance by mostly ground-based anti-aircraft fire, all 73 recently landed B-17s got hit and about 50 got destroyed. About 25 additional other aircraft - mostly Soviet fighters - were also damaged or destroyed and the air base suffered infrastructure damage. The Luftwaffe suffered minimal losses in this mission. It was one of last German air successes in the war and temporarily reduced Allied bombing strength available for Operation Frantic. However, strategic effects of this operations were negligible, as the Western Allies still had an overwhelming number of bomber aircraft at their disposal.

== Background ==
In order to extend the operational range of their bomber forces during the strategic bombing of Germany, the Western Allies introduced shuttle raids. Bombers would depart from airfields in Western Europe but, instead of returning to their home bases, would continue towards Soviet-controlled territory in Eastern Europe. This allowed the Allies to strike targets deep within Germany and Eastern Europe. These missions were conducted under the designation Operation Frantic, which began on 2 June 1944. On 21 June, a FRANTIC-2 bombing mission was successfully completed, targeting oil facilities and infrastructure in German-occupied territory. Of the 144 B-17 bombers returning from the mission, 73 landed at Poltava airfield. German aircraft shadowed the bomber formations and identified their landing sites. A strike force was assembled under the command of Wilhelm Antrup, consisting mainly of Heinkel He 111 bombers from KG 4, KG 53, and KG 55.

== The raid ==
During the early hours of 22 June, German bombers approached Poltava airfield unopposed. Pathfinder aircraft dropped illuminating flares over the airfield, after which German bombers commenced their attack. For about 2 hours, German aircraft flew over the air base and attacked the Allied forces. An estimated 110 tons of ordnance were dropped, causing extensive damage. The Allied defenders received warning only shortly before the German aircraft arrived, but only few Soviet fighter aircraft took off to intercept them. Soviet ground-based anti-aircraft guns engaged the Germans but proved largely ineffective. Fuel storage facilities and ammunition dumps were set ablaze. The resulting fires and explosions severely hampered Soviet efforts to coordinate the defense and extinguish the fires.

== Casualties ==
About 50 out of 73 recently landed B-17s were destroyed and the rest damaged. Additionally 2 C-47 Skytrain and 1 Lockheed F-5 were destroyed. The Soviet air forces suffered about 25 aircraft destroyed or damaged of all types, mostly Yakovlev fighters. Poltava Air Base suffered significant infrastructure damage. 30 Soviet soldiers were killed and another 45 wounded. The Germans suffered no losses during this mission. Western Allied air crew were housed away from the airfield, therefore their casualties were light. 2 Americans died and 6 were wounded.

== Aftermath ==
A follow-up raid was conducted during the night of 22-23 June against nearby air bases at Myrhorod and Pyriatyn, where the other half of the FRANTIC II force had landed. However, having been forewarned by the events at Poltava, the defenders were better prepared, and damage was very limited.

The Poltava air raid was one of the Luftwaffe's last major tactical successes. It reduced the strength of subsequent FRANTIC raids. Western Allies had generally been lukewarm towards the FRANTIC missions due to difficulties in cooperating and coordinating with the Soviets. These doubts were further amplified by the raid on Poltava, leading to heightened tensions between the Soviets and the Western Allies. The shuttle missions were frozen for one month. The Americans requested Soviet permission to deploy Northrop P-61 night fighters to protect the air fields, but this was not given. The next two FRANTIC missions starting in July saw only fighters deployed without any bomber aircraft. Operations finally returned to normal with FRANTIC V in August 1944.

The continued advance of the Allied forces against Germany made the FRANTIC missions soon obsolete and they were discontinued at the end of September. Despite the significant losses at Poltava, the overall balance of air power remained unchanged, as the Allies still enjoyed overwhelming numerical superiority over Germany.

== See also ==
- Operation Frantic
- Defense of the Reich

== Bibliography ==
- Conversino, Mark J. (1991). "Operation Frantic". Air Power History. 38 (1): 23–38. ISSN 1044-016X. JSTOR 26272293.
- Correll, John T. (March 2011). "The Poltava Debacle". Air Force Magazine.
- Kalnoy; Sovenko (1997). "Полтавская история. Часть III" [The Poltava Story, Part III]. Авиация и Время (in Russian). 2 (22): 34.
- Kreis, John F. (1988). Air Warfare and Air Base Air Defense, 1914–1973 (PDF). Washington, D.C.: Office of Air Force History, United States Air Force. pp. 204–210. ISBN 978-0-912799-55-1.
- Muller, Richard R. (2019). "A Tale of Two Bomb Groups: The Luftwaffe's II. Gruppe, KG 4 and the USAAF's 452nd Bomb Group (Heavy)" (PDF). Air Power History. 66 (1): 30–38.
