= Kampfgeschwader 53 =

Nazi German WWII bomber wing (1939–1945)

- Active: 1939–45
- Country: Nazi Germany
- Branch: Luftwaffe
- Type: Bomber Squadron
- Role: Tactical and direct ground support
- Size: Air Force Wing
- Nickname: Legion Condor
- Engagements: Invasion of Poland; Battle of the Netherlands; Battle of Belgium; Battle of France; Battle of Britain; Eastern Front; Western Front

Insignia
- Identification symbol: Geschwaderkennung of A1

Kampfgeschwader 53 "Legion Condor" (KG 53; English: Condor Legion) was a Luftwaffe bomber wing during World War II. Its units participated on all of the fronts in the European Theatre until it was disbanded in May 1945. At all times it operated the German bomber type Heinkel He 111. Only the 15th (kroat) Squadron of KG 53 (15.(kroat)/KG 53), established in Agram (Zagreb) July 1942, operated the Dornier Do 17 Z.

== Operational history ==
Kampfgeschwader 53 was formed on 1 May 1939 with Stab/KG 53 and I. Gruppe at Ansbach, II. Gruppe at Schwäbisch Hall and III. Gruppe at Giebelstadt near Würzburg.

=== Invasion of Poland ===
The Geschwader was initially put on "standby" in western Germany, in case of an Allied offensive. As a result, most of its Gruppen did not see action in the campaign. I./KG 53 was put under the command of Luftflotte 1. It had a strength of 31 He 111s, all serviceable. It was committed from the first day, but on 6 September it was moved to Luftflotte 4. The Gruppe lost only 1 aircraft in the campaign.

=== Invasion of France and the Low Countries ===
I./KG 53 flew support missions against supply and rail targets in the Reims area. Later targets in Abbeville, Amiens, Rouen and Arras were attacked. I./KG 53 recorded zero losses in the first two days. II./KG had 36 He 111s on strength and participated at the Sedan breakthrough, attacking targets around Lille, and supported I./KG 53.

=== Battle of Britain ===
Assigned to Luftflotte 2 I./KG 53 was relocated to Wevelgem, Belgium on 1 July 1940. It carried out operations over Britain until 11 May. It remained inactive until 18 June when it was withdrawn to Poland. II./KG 53 continued until the same date. Its targets included night attacks against RAF Fighter Commands airfields, most in East Anglia. It took part in the heavy air fighting on the 18 August 1940, dubbed, "The Hardest Day". III./KG 53 continued to support the other Gruppen, all of which were involved in the 15 September raid, known as the Battle of Britain Day.

=== Invasion of the Soviet Union ===
The Geschwader supported the operations of Army Group Centre in the initial phase of the war in the east. It participated in the Battle of Białystok-Minsk, Battle of Brody, Battle of Kiev and Battle of Smolensk. It supported the push to capture Moscow, which resulted in the failed Battle of Moscow. It was withdrawn to Germany to rest in December 1941– January 1942.

KG 53 supported Fall Blau and the German Sixth Army at the Battle of Stalingrad, and took part in the desperate resupply operation after the Russian counteroffensive had encircled the Sixth Army. Attacks were also carried out in northern Russia, against Leningrad. Strategic bombing attacks were also conducted against Gorki in June 1943, aimed at the Tank factory at Gorkovskiy Avtomobilniy. All of GAZ No. 1 plants 50 buildings, 9,000 metres of conveyors, 5,900 units of equipment and 8,000 tank engines were destroyed or damaged. The Kampfgeschwader supported Operation Citadel, and the subsequent Battle of Kursk.

On 14 October 1943 the unit took part in a short strategic bombing campaign in Russia. USAAF formations had been flying shuttle missions to Soviet territory after bombing German targets. The operation, named Zaunkönig, struck at American airfields (Poltava Air Base) in Ukraine. KG 53 and KG 55 took part in the attack. The Russians failed to defend these aircraft from Luftwaffe attacks and the bombing destroyed some 44 B-17 bombers and damaged 26 others. Another 15 fighters were also destroyed. However, the Soviets began Operation Bagration soon after, and the Kampfgeschwaders switched back to supporting ground forces. Most of the units Gruppes were disbanded by October 1944. It appears that the last unit, 14.(Eis)/KG 3 was disbanded on 4 March 1945; its remaining personnel went to KG 76.

=== Western Front ===
KG 53 was withdrawn from the Eastern Front in August 1944 and soon after began operations over Britain, flying He 111H-22 bombers outfitted to air launch V-1 flying bombs. Operations were suspended on 25 January 1945, due to fuel shortages, Allied defences, and the inability to determine the results.
