= Operation Frantic =

USAF operating in part from Soviet bases during WWII

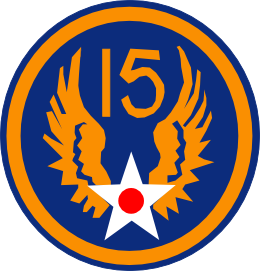
Operation Frantic
- Part of Strategic bombing during World War II
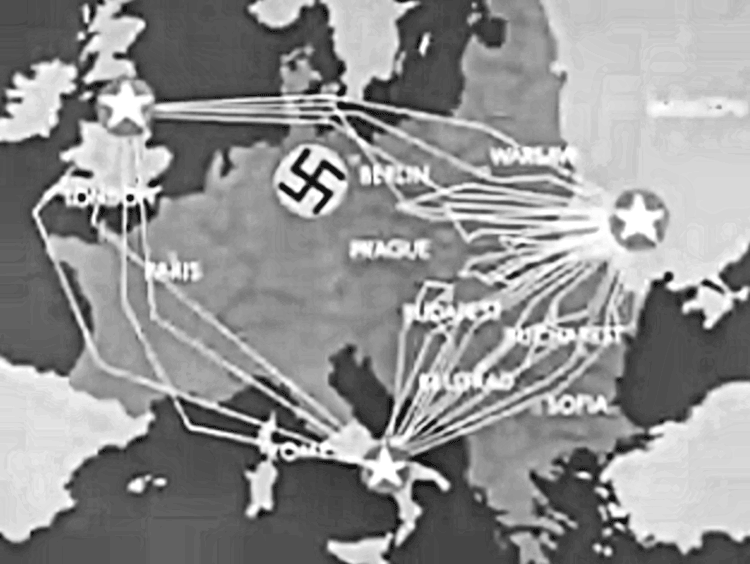
- Operation Frantic routes
Date	June–September 1944
Location	European Theatre of Operations
Result	Operational failure

Belligerents
United States; Soviet Union	Germany; Hungary; Romania

Operation Frantic was a series of seven shuttle bombing operations during World War II conducted by American aircraft based in Great Britain and southern Italy, which landed at three Soviet airfields in the Ukrainian SSR. From there, the planes flew bombing missions en route back to their bases in Italy and Great Britain.

Frantic was meant to open up new German-held areas of Europe to strategic bombing by the United States Army Air Forces, but saw mixed results, with German leadership perceiving the operation as an American propaganda campaign to impress the Soviets. Frantic also highlighted significant tensions between the Western Allies and the Soviet Union, which proved both unfamiliar with and unfriendly to hosting foreign aircraft for joint operations. After its seventh bombing mission, in mid-September 1944, Frantic was discontinued.

== Overview ==
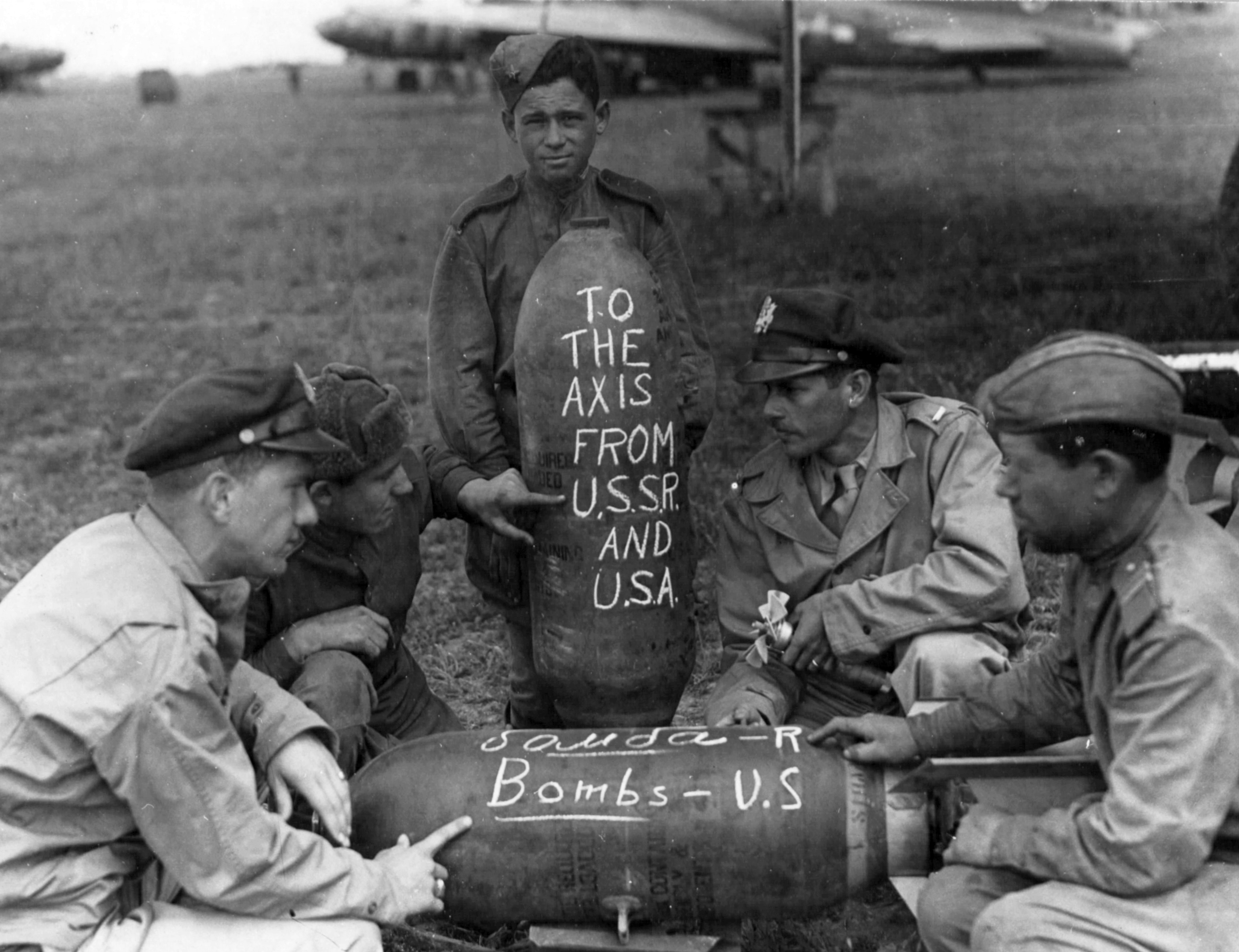
American and Soviet military personnel write messages on aerial bombs

American plans to use air bases in the USSR began as United States Army Air Forces (USAAF) staff studies soon after the German invasion on 22 June 1941. After the Japanese attack on the United States on 7 December, the concept was expanded to hit the Japanese Home Islands from Siberia. However, Soviet air cooperation was negligible through 1942, and it was not until the Foreign Ministers' conference (Moscow Conference) in Moscow in October 1943 that the American delegation raised the issue formally with Foreign Commissar Vyacheslav Molotov.

At the Tehran Conference in late November 1943, President Franklin D. Roosevelt personally proposed the use of Soviet bases by American aircraft to Marshal Joseph Stalin. In this he was assisted by a personal appeal from his son, Colonel Elliott Roosevelt, also in attendance, who requested the bases for use of his reconnaissance aircraft then operating from Italy.

The position papers given to Stalin emphasized both reconnaissance and bombardment operations, and Stalin agreed to proceed with the plan "in principle." American heavy bombers stationed in Britain and Italy would fly strike missions deep into the heart of Nazi territory or occupied Eastern Europe. Afterwards, they would land at American air bases in newly recovered Soviet territory, re-arm and re-fuel, and then attack other targets on their return flights.

Operation Frantic, originally known as Operation Baseball, was intended to permanently establish three heavy bomber groups in Soviet territory, but only a small contingent, about 1,300 men, was eventually detached to the American bases in the USSR.

During the four months of major operations, 24 targets in German-held territory—some never before within effective range of the American strategic bomber forces—were attacked.

While the shuttle bombing technique complicated German air defenses, in practice most targets were already coming in reach of US bomber streams from Italy and England. Soviet vetoing of some targets prevented more effective use of the bases.

The operations were reduced and finally discontinued due to a number of issues; a catastrophic German air attack on the bases in June; Soviet hostility and non-cooperation that started in August; and the inability of the Americans to receive permission to use the bases for support of the Warsaw Uprising or for repatriation of American POWs from Soviet territory, which soured relations between the two countries.

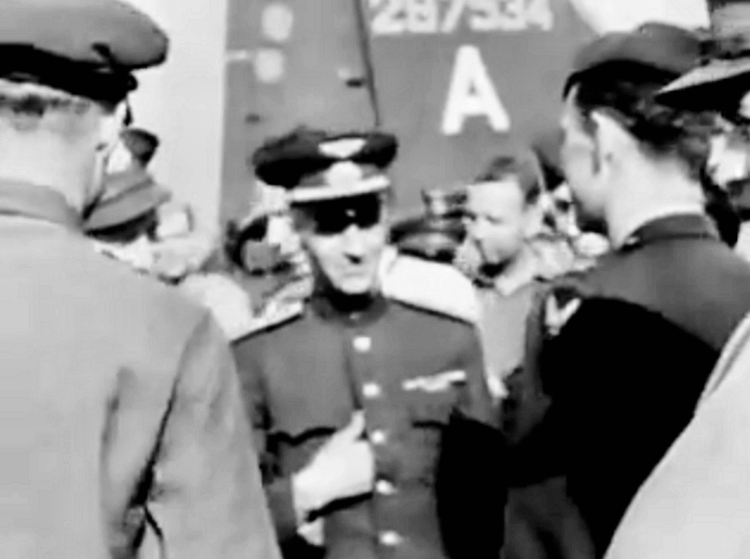
VVS and USAAF airmen meet at Poltava, 2 June 1944. Despite the tensions between Soviet and American Leadership over Operation Frantic, the American airmen were made to feel very welcome by the Soviet personnel assigned to support them.

The main operational difficulty encountered by the US forces was inadequate force protection by the Soviets. The Soviets refused US requests to introduce adequate radar-guided artillery and night fighter support, and US aircraft were frequently fired upon by Soviet forces.

External images
- Operation Bellicose map

The three bases reached their peak in July and August 1944, with a firmly limited complement of 1,300 US officers and men. By October, operations were put on a "skeleton crew" basis, with a winter contingent at Poltava only of about 300. Americans remained there until evacuation after VE Day.

Operation Frantic has greater historical importance for the development of Soviet-American relations than for its effect on Germany's war effort. Although it started out with high hopes, it eventually set a discordant note that foreshadowed the Cold War.

== Objectives ==
The ability to hit distant German targets was not the only, or even the primary, American objective for Operation Frantic. The political and military leadership wanted also to set a precedent and practical basis for later bombing of Japan from Siberia after the USSR opened the second front in the Pacific. Additionally, they wanted to provide a model for developing trust and cooperation between the two powers, which was deemed essential to establishing amicable post-war relations; and to develop close cooperation and exchanges in technology and research, specifically telecommunications, meteorology, air reconnaissance, and air transport networks.

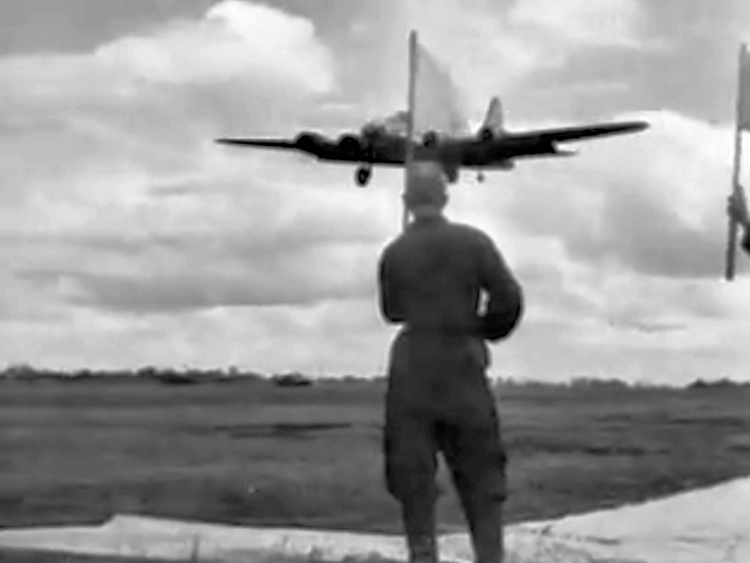
B-17s arriving at Poltava, 2 June 1944.

After approval was given by Moscow in February 1944, a rapid buildup followed. Staff exchanges were made; the first "echelons" of American personnel began to arrive; and a US delegation flew to Moscow in an operational B-17, which was used to demonstrate American bombing tactics to the Soviets. A USAAF Eastern Command (General Alfred Kessler) was established at Poltava, operating in parallel with the new American Military Mission to Moscow (General John R. Deane).

When a high-level US delegation led by United States Strategic Air Forces (USSTAF) deputy chief of staff for operations, General Frederick Anderson (accompanied by Colonel Roosevelt), visited Moscow and the bases in May 1944, conditions were such that the go-ahead for actual operations could be given. At the same time, Anderson let his side know that the ultimate goal was the establishment of a numbered American air force in the USSR and a switch to Siberian operations. For diplomatic reasons, this could not be revealed to the Soviets. As it was, the Americans had to make do with a much smaller presence in the Soviet Union than originally contemplated.

Frantic also tied in with other US initiatives. At Tehran, General Henry Arnold (chief of the Air Forces) offered Stalin 300–400 B-24 bombers, but noted that they would require a large Soviet training program in the United States. Stalin did not take this offer; instead, American B-29 bombers after bombing Japan and diverting to Siberia for safety landing were kept and copied by Soviet factories.

Britain's Royal Air Force did not participate in Operation Frantic. However, 21 RAF Avro Lancaster bombers did fly from a Soviet airfield in September 1944 in a separate operation—Operation Paravane—to attack the battleship Tirpitz.

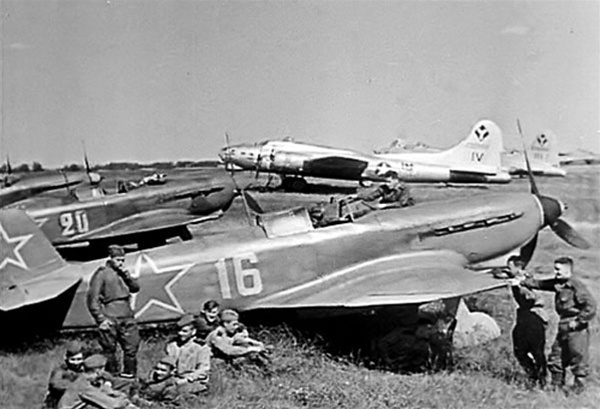
USAAF Fifteenth Air Force B-17 Flying Fortresses and Red Air Force Yakovlev Yak-9 fighters share an airfield as aircrews swap sorties, 1944.

Uncertainty surrounds Soviet objectives in agreeing to the operation. Unlike the Americans, the USSR had no doctrine of victory through aerial bombardment, and had only a rudimentary long-range air force. Furthermore, when the survival of the USSR was in doubt, Marshal Stalin refused offers of air support, demanding instead maximum lend-lease deliveries. By the time Stalin finally agreed to activate the plan, in a meeting with US ambassador W. Averell Harriman on 2 February 1944, Soviet victory was assured. Indications are that Stalin wished to obtain all possible information about superior American technology, and assigned officers with the stated objectives of learning as much as they could about US equipment and concepts of operation. For example, the USSR demanded and obtained the secret Norden bombsight, and also obtained wide photographic coverage of Europe from American aircraft. However, this objective cut both ways, for the USAAF also learned of the extreme vulnerability of the USSR to air attack, and of the primitive technical and infrastructure conditions prevailing on the Soviet side.

== Airfields ==
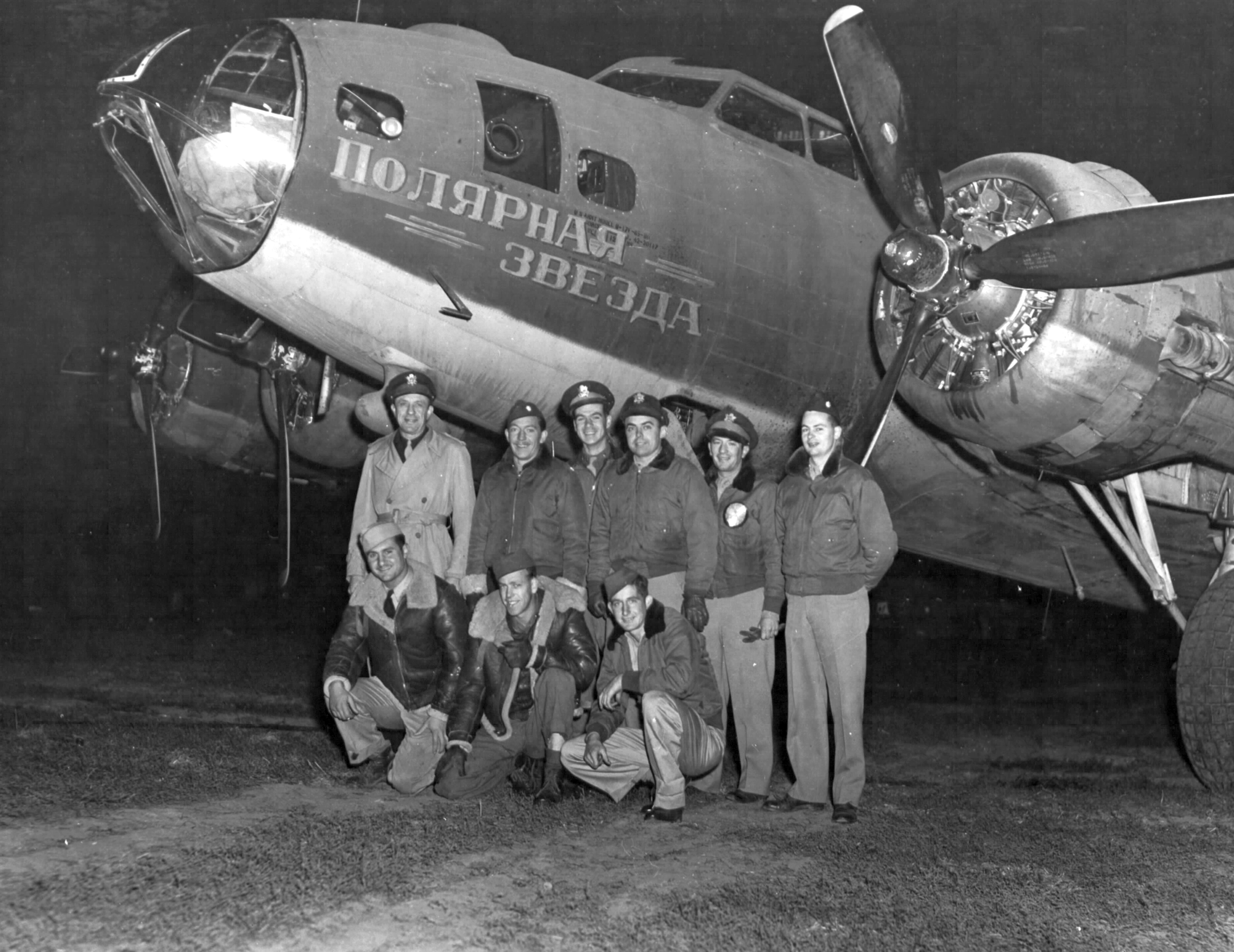
A B-17 crew poses with their plane. The nose art on the bomber reads "Polar Star" (referring to the star Polaris) in Russian.

After meeting with Stalin on 2 February 1944, Harriman radioed back that "Stalin approves project limited to 200 bombers and six airfields." In the end only three bases were set up. In haste, the United States Strategic Air Forces in Europe established a headquarters detachment at Poltava Airfield, in Poltava region in the Ukrainian SSR in late April, 1944. Poltava was designated as USAAF Station 559 for security purposes and was thus referred to in all messages and written correspondence. Poltava was one of three Soviet installations operated by Headquarters, Eastern Command USAAF. The others were Pyriatyn Airfield (AAF-560) and Myrhorod Airfield (AAF-561). All three bases were situated along the Kharkov-Kiev railway and were already far behind the front. Poltava and Mirgorod were to be used by heavy bombers (B-24 Liberators, B-17 Flying Fortresses), while Piriatyn would be used for long-range escort fighters (P-51 Mustangs, P-38 Lightnings).

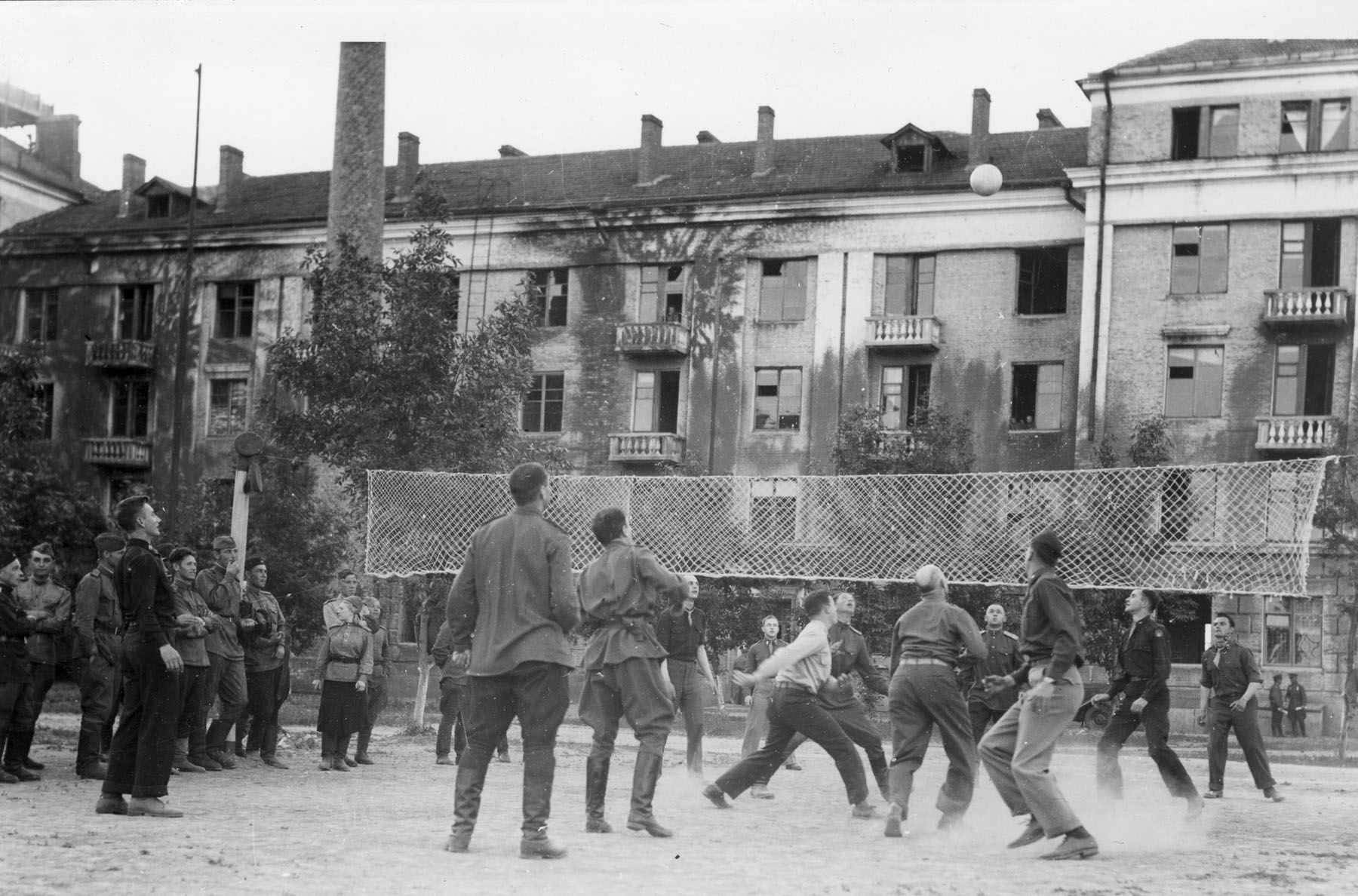
Soviet and American servicemen playing volleyball in the courtyard of Eastern Command headquarters at Poltava. Fifth from right is USAAF general Ira Eaker

The bases were farther away than the USAAF wanted, and despite the best efforts were barely adequate for heavy bombers. Soviet infrastructure was not up to Western standards; the spring season turned everything into a sea of mud; and the retreating Germans had destroyed whatever they could. At Poltava, the Germans left behind a large headquarters building, but it was booby-trapped with a radio-controlled bomb that was, however, discovered in time. Also, the American officers found themselves dealing with an unfriendly and suspicious Soviet bureaucracy. In general, US officers agreed that the Red Air Force was cooperative and eager to assist, but the political structure was obstructionist and a source of interminable delays and problems. After August–September, the Soviet attitude became universally hostile, and by 1945 the small American detachments left in great bitterness. Winston Churchill had not been very enthusiastic about Frantic, believing that it was placing a lot more trust on Stalin than was wise, and events seemed to bear him out.

Heavy equipment and bulky supplies went by sea to the ports of Murmansk and Arkhangelsk in the Arctic, and then by train to the airfields in the Ukrainian SSR. Additional supplies and key personnel flew in on Air Transport Command planes from the ATC base at Mehrabad Airport, Iran. As there was no trans-Caucasian railway, additional shipping went across the Caspian to Baku. The logistical demands were enormous since almost everything had to be brought from the United States, even the high-octane aviation fuel and the steel-plank runways. Delicate negotiations finally fixed a total of 42 round-trip ATC missions to make the bases operational for the AAF, and allowed an additional rate of two weekly support missions to sustain the US contingent. The issue of flight communications eventually ended with a compromise, allowing US crews to carry out navigation and radio duties with a Soviet observer resident at all related communications centers. In support of Operation Frantic, ATC delivered some 450 personnel and thirty-six thousand pounds of cargo by June 1944.

== Known units ==
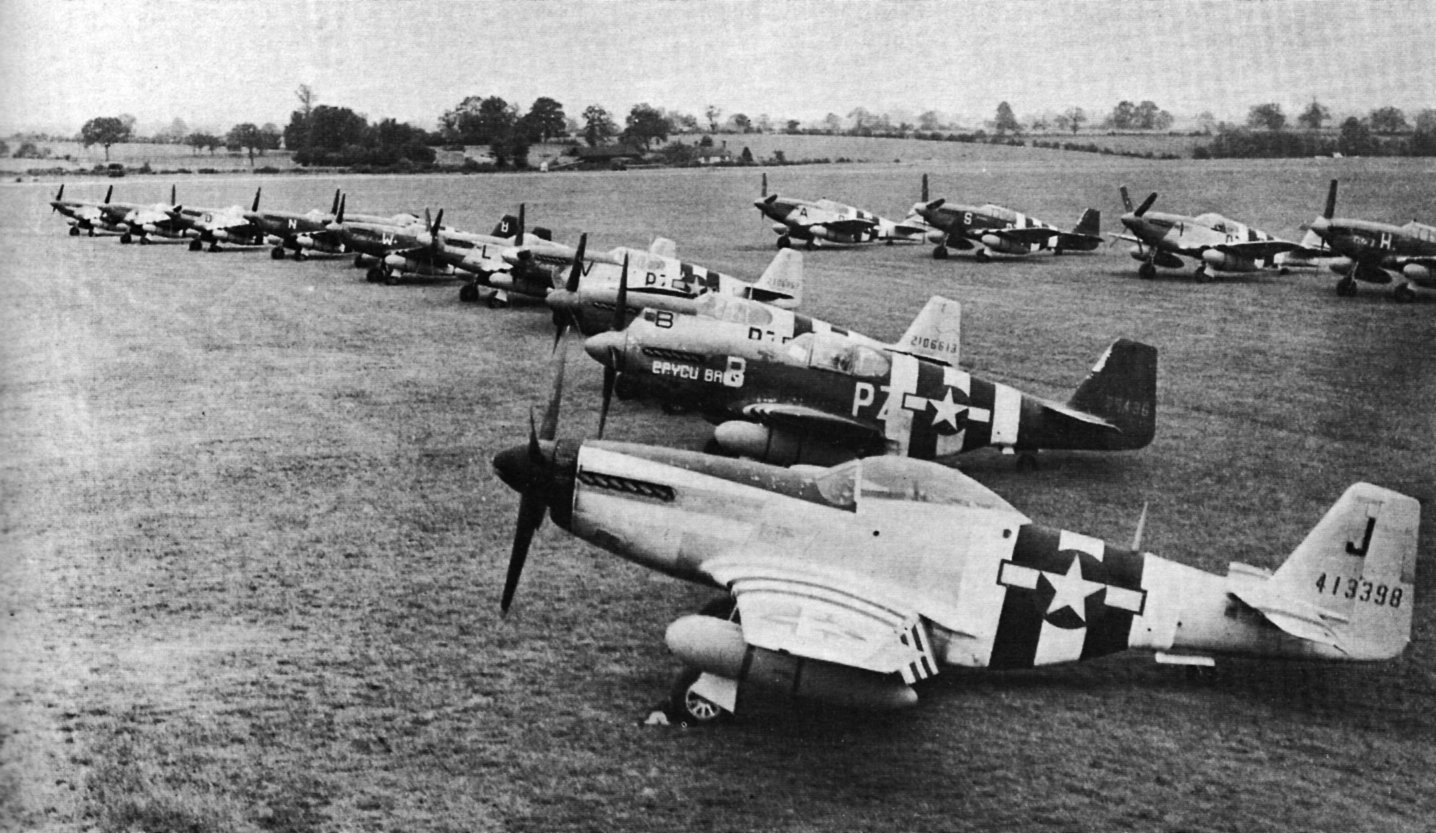
P-51 Mustangs of the 486th Fighter Squadron at RAF Debden 20 June 1944

- Eighth Air Force

45th Combat Wing (at Poltava Airfield, ca 75 bombers)
96th Bombardment Group, RAF Snetterton Heath, B-17 Flying Fortress
388th Bombardment Group, RAF Knettishall, B-17 Flying Fortress
452d Bombardment Group, RAF Deopham Green, B-17 Flying Fortress

13th Combat Wing (at Myrhorod Airfield, ca 75 bombers)
95th Bombardment Group, RAF Horham, B-17 Flying Fortress
100th Bombardment Group, RAF Thorpe Abbotts, B-17 Flying Fortress
390th Bombardment Group, RAF Framlingham, B-17 Flying Fortress

Escort Fighter (at Pyriatyn Airfield)
4th Fighter Group, RAF Debden, P-51 Mustang
352nd Fighter Group, RAF Bodney, P-51 Mustang
355th Fighter Group, RAF Steeple Morden, P-51 Mustang
357th Fighter Group, RAF Leiston, P-51 Mustang
20th Fighter Group, USAF Kings Cliffe P-51 Mustang
25th Bomb Group Rcn, USAAF Watton Mosquito x 2

- Fifteenth Air Force

2d Bombardment Group, Amendola Airfield, B-17 Flying Fortress
97th Bombardment Group, Amendola Airfield, B-17 Flying Fortress
99th Bombardment Group, Tortorella Airfield, B-17 Flying Fortress
483rd Bombardment Group, Sterparone Airfield, B-17 Flying Fortress
14th Fighter Group, Triolo Airfield, P-38 Lightning
31st Fighter Group, San Severo Airfield, P-51 Mustang
82nd Fighter Group, Vincenzo Airfield, P-38 Lightning
325th Fighter Group, Mondolfo Airfield, P-51 Mustang

== Operations ==
A photographic reconnaissance detachment with a handful of P-38 Lightnings was sent to operate local flights from Poltava in late May, and a "triangular trade" in reconnaissance operations using Italy, the Soviet Union, and England preceded the bombing runs and also ran concurrently with them over the summer. These flights were conducted by units of the 325th Reconnaissance Wing, commanded by Colonel Elliott Roosevelt.

After much preparation at the three Soviet airfields by advance elements of Headquarters, Eastern Command USAAF and Air Transport Command, the first shuttle mission ("Frantic Joe") was conducted by Fifteenth Air Force B-17 Flying Fortresses and their P-51 Mustang fighter escorts taking off from airfields around Foggia, Italy, raiding the railroad marshalling yards at Debrecen, Hungary, and then flying on to the Soviet Union. The name Frantic Joe, which was read as an unflattering and potentially insulting reference to Joseph Stalin, whose insistence had influenced the mission's conception, was later shortened to Frantic.

=== First Shuttle Mission (Fifteenth Air Force) ===
==== 2 June 1944 ====
130 B-17s, escorted by 70 P-51s, bomb the marshaling yard at Debrecen, Hungary (47°31′10″N 021°37′41″E) and land at bases in the USSR; the B-17s at Poltava and Mirgorod and the P-51s at Piriatyn. One B-17F (42-30319, 301st BG, 419th BS) is lost over the target; 27 other B-17s, forced off course en route to the Nagyvárad, Hungary marshaling yard, also hit Debrecen. The mission was led in person by the Commander-in-Chief of the Mediterranean Allied Air Forces, Ira Eaker who wanted to impress the Soviet leaders and the military at Poltava. There was disagreement about the targets, and finally on John R. Deane’s suggestion Carl Spaatz selected the marshalling yards at Debrecen in Hungary; the Soviets did not object as unlike proposed targets in Riga (a Heinkel airplane plant) it was some distance from the imminent Soviet offensive Operation Bagration. As it was thought that the Poltava base facilities would not be adequate for serious repairs, the force was to avoid unnecessary confrontations with the Luftwaffe, and other Fifteenth Air Force planes bombed in the Balkans as a distraction. Eaker flew in a B-17 of the 97th Bomber Group called Yankee Doodle II. He was received at Poltava by Averell Harriman, American generals, and Soviet generals including General Permonov. Later at Poltava they heard Churchill’s speech announcing Operation Overlord.

==== 6 June 1944 ====
104 B-17s and 42 P-51s attack the airfield at Galați, Romania and return to their shuttle bases in the USSR. Eight enemy fighters are shot down and two P-51Bs (42-103369, 42-103432, 325th FG, 318th FS) are lost.

==== 11 June 1944 ====
126 B-17s and 60 P-51s depart their Soviet shuttle bases for Italy, completing FRANTIC-1. On the way, 121 of the B-17s bomb the Focșani, Romania airfield (45°46′29″N 027°11′31″E) One B-17F (42-3383, 97th BG) is lost.
After the first shuttle mission, the consensus was that operations had been highly successful, and spirits were high at Poltava.

=== Second Shuttle Mission (Eighth Air Force) ===
The second shuttle raid assigned Eighth Air Force B-17s to attack synthetic oil facilities near Berlin on the way to the Soviet Union.

==== 21 June 1944 ====
145 of 163 B-17s open shuttle bombing between the United Kingdom and the USSR. 72 P-38s, 38 P-47 Thunderbolts and 57 P-51s escort the B-17s to the target, a synthetic oil plant at Ruhland, Germany (51°29′00″N 013°53′36″E) 123 B-17s bomb the primary target, 21 bomb the marshaling yard at Elsterwerda (51°27′32″N 013°30′57″E) and a lone B-17 bombs the marshaling yard at Riesa (51°18′34″N 013°16′46″E) owing to a bomb rack malfunction. 65 4th Fighter Group P-51s relieve the first escort force and accompany the B-17s to the USSR. 20 to 30 Luftwaffe fighters attack the force; in the resulting battle a P-51B (43-6784, 4th FG, 335th FS) and six German fighters are destroyed; a B-17F (42-3490) of the 385th Bombardment Group, 549th Bomb Squadron piloted by Matthew Totter is damaged by flak and loses three engines. It flies to Sweden, is interned, and later converted to SE-BAN, a Swedish airliner. 144 B-17s land in the USSR; 73 at Poltava, and the rest at Mirgorod. The 64 remaining P-51s land at Piriatyn.

=== Luftwaffe Raid ===
What was unknown at the time is that after the raid on Ruhland, the attacking B-17s were being shadowed from a distance by a Luftwaffe Heinkel He 111 bomber, which identified the Soviet airfields where they landed. Other sources indicate that the Germans were already aware of the locations and had assembled a strike force at Minsk in anticipation.

On the early morning of 22 June, the Combat Wing of B-17s which earlier landed at Poltava sustained severe losses in a German air attack. Hungarian planes also participated in the attack. Personnel were alerted at approximately 2330 hours when it was announced that German bombers had crossed the front lines in the general direction of Poltava. At 0030 hours, Pathfinder aircraft released flares directly above the airfield and ten minutes later the first bombs were dropped. For almost two hours, an estimated 75 Luftwaffe bombers attacked the base, exhibiting a very high degree of accuracy. Nearly all bombs were dropped in the dispersal area of the landing ground where only B-17s were parked, indicating without question that the B-17s constituted the specific objective of the raiders.

Of the 73 B-17s which had landed at Poltava, 47 were destroyed and most of the remainder severely damaged. One American B-17 copilot, Joseph Lukacek, was killed. His captain, Raymond Estele, was severely wounded and died later; several other men suffered minor injuries. The stores of fuel and ammunition brought so laboriously from the United States were also destroyed. Three days after the attack, only nine of the 73 aircraft at Poltava were operational. The truck-mounted 50-caliber machine guns that the Soviet high command insisted would be adequate had no effect on the Luftwaffe, as no aircraft were shot down or disabled. Also, Soviet and American fighter aircraft were not allowed to take off (by Soviet high-command) to engage the Luftwaffe during this attack; the reason for this is unclear.

American personnel losses were light due to adequate warning and the network of slit trenches distant from the aircraft parking area. Soviet losses were much higher since work crews were ordered to fight fires and disable anti-personnel bombs while the raid was ongoing. Butterfly bombs continued to explode on the field for many weeks thereafter. Red Air Force losses included 15 Yak-9s, 6 Yak-7s, three trainers, a Hawker Hurricane, and a VIP DC-3. Soviet anti-aircraft fire was intense but random, and perversely served to outline the field for the German aircraft. There are conflicting reports about whether Soviet aircraft engaged the enemy, but since there was no radar intercept capability, even American fighters would have been ineffective.

The well-planned German attack was led by Oberstleutnant Wilhelm Antrup of KG 55 and carried out by He 111Hs and Ju 88s of KG 4, KG 53, KG 55, and KG 27 operating from bases at Minsk. The operation was nicknamed Zaunkoenig. After the He 111s left, the Ju 88s strafed the field at low altitude. He 177s from Night Reconnaissance Squadrons performed target reconnaissance, pathfinder duties and bomb damage assessment. There were no German losses.

==== 22 June 1944 ====
The flyable B-17s at Mirgorod and the P-51s at Piriatyn were flown to Soviet air bases farther east in anticipation of further attacks; they were to be returned and dispatched to bases in Italy as soon as the weather permitted. This saved many aircraft, as German bombers struck both Piriatyn and Mirgorod during the nights of 22 and 23 June. Piriatyn had very short runways and had no fuel or munitions for the aircraft. The Germans missed Piriatyn while fuel and ammunition stores at Mirgorod were hit. Air Transport Command ferried the now-excess aircrews back to the UK via Mehrabad Airport, Tehran, Iran.

==== 26 June 1944 ====
Losses and damage sustained from the Luftwaffe bomber attack on Poltava and damage suffered en route to the Soviet Union had reduced the number of operational B-17s to a total of 73. All available aircraft were formed into one composite combat wing of three groups for the execution of the return mission to Italy. The aircraft at the dispersal airfields were flown back to Myrhorod and Poltava for servicing, rearming and refueling. This delayed the take-off times to mid-afternoon, which meant that the aircraft would not arrive in Italy until the early evening twilight. The B-17s rendezvous with 55 P-51s from Piriatyn, bomb the oil refinery and marshaling yard at Drohobycz, Poland (49°20′18″N 023°29′07″E) and then proceed on to Fifteenth Air Force bases in southern Italy. One B-17 returns to the USSR because of mechanical trouble. Fifteenth Air Force P-51s meet the formation one hour after the attack and escort the B-17s to Foggia. It was planned for the Eighth Air Force aircraft to return to bases in England on 27 June or as soon thereafter as weather conditions permitted, but unfavorable forecasts persisted. During this period the B-17s participated in one Fifteenth Air Force mission and the P-51s in two missions.

==== 2 July 1944 ====
The Eighth Air Force P-51s joined with other Fifteenth Air Force fighters in escorting 509 heavy bombers on a mission to three objectives in the Budapest, Hungary area; a marshaling yard (47°27′56″N 019°05′37″E) (253 aircraft); Vecses Airfield (47°26′02″N 019°15′33″E) (142 aircraft) and the Shell Oil Refinery (47°26′23″N 019°03′43″E) (114 aircraft). The P-51s preceded the bombers and conducted a free-lance sweep in the target area. Aggressive enemy opposition was encountered and 4 P-51s were lost in combat and one other P-51 failed to return. USAAF bombers and fighters claim 50+ enemy fighters shot down.

==== 3 July 1944 ====
57 Eighth Air Force B-17s are dispatched, escorted by 38 of the P-51s, in conjunction with 44 Fifteenth Air Force heavy bombers attacking a marshaling yard and railway shops at Arad, Romania (46°11′39″N 021°19′21″E)

==== 5 July 1944 ====
72 Eighth Air Force B-17s complete FRANTIC-2 by attacking a marshaling yard at Béziers, France (43°19′49″N 003°14′15″E) along with Fifteenth Air Force B-24s while on the last leg of the mission from Italy to the UK; 42 P-51s return to the UK with the B-17s. Of the 11 P-51s remaining in Italy, ten return to the UK the following day and the last one several days later.

After the Poltava disaster, the USAAF wanted to move the P-61 Black Widow-equipped 427th Night Fighter Squadron to Poltava to provide radar-enabled night air defense over the fields. However, the Soviets vetoed this plan, insisting that air defense was their responsibility. The P-61s were diverted to Italy. The shuttle bombing missions were not abandoned for the moment, but they were suspended until the mess on the ground could be cleaned up and the defenses of the air bases improved. Realizing that the Soviets could not adequately protect the heavy bombers from night raids, the Americans abandoned plans to permanently station three heavy bomber groups on Soviet airfields.

Because of the loss of fuel and the inability to protect the force, the next Frantic missions were composed of long-range fighters.

=== Third Shuttle Mission (Fifteenth Air Force) ===
To keep the project alive, Fifteenth Air Force next shuttled P-38 and P-51 fighters to the Soviet Union in late July.

==== 22 July 1944 ====
72 x P-38s from the 14th FG and 82nd FG along with 47 x P-51s from the 31st FG begin the second Fifteenth Air Force shuttle mission by attacking Fliegerhorst Buzău (45°08′00″N 026°48′25″E) and Fliegerhorst Ziliștea (45°13′30″N 026°58′30″E), Romania, and landing at bases in the USSR. 44 x aircraft claimed damaged / destroyed

==== 25 July 1944 ====
Operating from their USSR bases, 34 P-51s and 33 P-38s attack the airfield at Mielec, Poland (50°19′20″N 021°27′24″E) and return to the USSR. Mielec was the site of the PZL aircraft factory.

==== 26 July 1944 ====
The fighters leave their USSR bases, strafe enemy aircraft in the Bucharest–Ploiești, Romania area, and return to their bases in Italy, completing FRANTIC-3.

=== Fourth Shuttle Mission (Fifteenth Air Force) ===
==== 4 August 1944 ====
In an attempt to comply with the first direct Soviet request for USAAF air strikes, 70+ P-38s and P-51s of the Fifteenth Air Force leave Italy, attack the airfield and town of Focșani, Romania (45°41′59″N 027°07′56″E) and land at bases in the USSR.

==== 6 August 1944 ====
60 fighters of the Fifteenth Air Force take off from their bases in the USSR, attack the Craiova marshaling yard (44°20′22″N 023°47′25″E) along with other railroad targets in the Bucharest–Ploiești, Romania area, and land at their bases in southern Italy, completing FRANTIC-4.

After balancing losses and battle damage against the value of the targets, US military leaders at the Soviet bases discontinue the fighter-bomber operations.

=== Fifth Shuttle Mission (Eighth Air Force) ===
==== 6 August 1944 ====
75 B-17s hit the Kannenberg aircraft factories at Gotenhafen (Gdynia), (54°34′50″N 018°31′53″E) and proceed on to bases in the USSR. Escort is provided by 154 P-51s.

==== 7 August 1944 ====
A shuttle mission is flown in accordance with a Soviet request; 55 B-17s and 29 P-51s attack an oil refinery at Trzebinia, German occupied Poland without loss and return to bases in the USSR, killing many Polish workers.

==== 12 August 1944 ====
All aircraft fly to Fifteenth Air Force bases in southern Italy.

==== 13 August 1944 ====
72 B-17s take off from Fifteenth Air Force bases in southern Italy; three have various problems, the others bomb Francazal Airfield, just south of Toulouse, France, (43°32′39″N 001°22′04″E) and then proceed on to the UK. 62 P-51 Mustangs, (part of the shuttle-mission force) along with 43 from the UK, provide escort. No aircraft are lost; 70 B-17s and 58 P-51s land in the UK. Five B-17s and six P-51s, either left in Italy or in the process of returning there during this mission also fly to the UK, completing FRANTIC-5.

During this period, the United States at the highest level urgently requested the use of the Soviet bases for air support and supply of the ongoing Polish Home Army uprising in Warsaw. However, until the Poles had already been substantially crushed, Stalin refused all assistance and vetoed these missions. This caused a crisis in Soviet-American relations and changed US perceptions of Soviet war aims among both military officers and diplomats.

=== Sixth Shuttle Mission (Eighth Air Force) ===
==== 11 September 1944 ====
75 Eighth Air Force B-17s, with an escort of 64 P-51s, bomb oil refineries at Chemnitz, Germany, (50°21′22″N 012°55′24″E) and land at bases in the USSR.

==== 13 September 1944 ====
73 B-17s, escorted by 63 P-51s, take off from their USSR bases, bomb steel and armament works at Diósgyőr, Hungary (48°05′31″N 020°43′03″E) and proceed on to Fifteenth Air Force bases in southern Italy.

==== 15 September 1944 ====
The Eighth Air Force in England dispatches 110 B-17s to drop supplies to the Polish Home Army taking part in the Warsaw Uprising and then proceed on to bases in the USSR. However, a weather front is encountered over the North Sea and the bombers are recalled to England. Escort is provided by 149 P-51 Mustangs; two P-51s (42-106783, 43-24842, 363d FS) collide in a cloud and are lost.

==== 17 September 1944 ====
FRANTIC-6 is completed as 72 US Eighth Air Force B-17s and 59 P-51s fly without bombs from Italy to the UK.

=== Seventh Shuttle Mission (Eighth Air Force) ===
==== 18 September 1944 ====
After turning back due to bad weather on 15 September, the last Eighth Air Force UK-USSR-Italy-UK mission sends 107 B-17s to supply the Polish Home Army in Warsaw with 1,248 parachute-dropped containers. Fewer than 250 are on target for pick-up by the remaining Polish pockets. One B-17 is lost (43-38175 390th BG 568th BS). Escort is provided by 137 P-51s; 64 P-51s continue on to bases in the USSR. Two P-51s are lost (42-26386, 44-19735, 355th FG 386th/368th FS).

==== 19 September 1944 ====
100 B-17s and 61 P-51s take off from their bases in the USSR, bomb the marshaling yard at Szolnok, Hungary, (47°10′55″N 020°10′25″E) and continue on to Fifteenth Air Force bases in southern Italy. The aircraft remain in Italy due to bad weather until 23 September, when they return to the UK, completing FRANTIC-7.

== Summary ==
Measured against its objectives, and despite initial successes, Frantic developed into a failure that included the disastrous June 21 raid by the Luftwaffe. The attack on the Szolnok rail yards was the end of major Frantic operations, as the original targets had been taken by the rapidly advancing Soviet offensive. After the issues over Polish resupply, Foreign Commissar Molotov put the Americans on notice that they were no longer needed, and a very hostile climate, including orchestrated episodes of violence and theft, ensued at the bases. The USAAF, citing logistical problems and becoming weary of growing Soviet intransigence, announced a suspension of Frantic shuttle missions. Also, by this time air bases in the Mariana Islands became available to the Americans, and there was no longer a perceived need for bases in the Russian Far East. The US and Soviet advances by the spring of 1945 ended the need for shuttle missions and the ATC flew out the last US contingent of personnel from its headquarters at Poltava in June 1945.

Major problems were associated with the failure of air defense, but also with the eagerness with which Soviet fighters and artillery mistakenly targeted American aircraft. Several American aircraft were downed, but the crews survived. From the Soviet perspective, this was caused by the inability of US pilots to stick to the strictly defined corridors, altitudes, and time windows. On several occasions, US aircraft became dispersed all over the region, which severely complicated Soviet efforts to control and track all foreign aircraft. Soviet officers who had been too helpful to the Americans fell in disfavor, and one, Chief Air Marshal Alexander Novikov, who had received the US Legion of Merit, was tortured and jailed after the war. The problem of Soviet attacks on American aircraft was deemed so serious that when President Roosevelt flew to Yalta in February 1945 for the Yalta Conference, the Americans insisted on placing observers at all nearby anti-aircraft sites. Colonel Hampton the Poltava base commander was responsible for the Saki Airfield, the airfield closest to Yalta.

Frantic was peripheral to the air war against Germany because most targets could have been reached from Italy, and the Soviet bases were not used for purposes for which they could have been decisive: air supply of the Polish Home Army during the Warsaw Uprising, the return of American ex-POWs from Soviet territory, or interruption of extermination camp operations at Auschwitz and other locations. As it became increasingly clear that US-Soviet collaboration was an entirely one-way street, bitterness and suspicion grew amongst the Americans, feeling that would influence a future generation of senior United States Air Force officers.

In addition, the Soviets learned of their own vulnerability to air attack and the enormous US technological advantage. The USAAF obtained insight into Soviet operations, and despite strict limitations obtained some additional photographic coverage which would become much in demand later.

Operation Frantic demonstrated the flexibility and reach of American logistics operating under trying conditions. It also demonstrated the political role of airlift logistics in terms of operational support that would have been impossible by conventional ground-based means. Overall however, Frantic proved a wasteful use of Allied resources. Though judged by the Germans to be a propaganda exercise meant to impress the Soviets, the operation served to expose and compound strains in the Allied alliance.

== References in popular culture ==
The television series 12 O'Clock High combined the Operation Frantic shuttle missions into one episode. In the 1966 show "Massacre" (season 3, episode 2), the fictional 918th Bomb Group of the 8th Air Force is assigned as the lead unit to establish a shuttle mission to Poltava Air Base, Soviet Union. Its commander, Col. Gallagher, is tasked with the ambassadorial work of establishing and enhancing relations with the host Soviets. Actual issues with distrust between US and Soviet governments and militaries, establishing supplies for the return trip to England, worry about the Germans locating the US airbase in the eastern theater, successful German air raids, and the hope for greater surprise of the German air defenses during US bombing from the east were used in the storyline, along with fictional melodramatic elements.

== Bibliography and further reading ==
The USAAF prepared a secret, detailed report on Eastern Command operations in December 1944 and made it available to the State Department. It is preserved at the Air Force Historical Research Agency (AFHRA) at Maxwell AFB, Alabama.

- Daniel P. Bolger, Reluctant Allies: The United States Army Air Force and the Soviet Voenno Vozdushnie Sily 1941–1945 (Doctoral Dissertation)
- Conversino, Mark: Fighting with the Soviets: The Failure of Operation Frantic. University of Kansas Press, 1997. ISBN 0700608087. OCLC 35151263.
- Deane, John: The Strange Alliance. Indiana University Press, 1946, 1973. OCLC 229419046.
- Garthoff, Raymond L. (December 1971). "Eagles East: The Army Air Forces and the Soviet Union, 1941–1945. By Richard C. Lukas. Tallahassee: Florida State University Press, 1970. ix, 256 pp. $10.00". Slavic Review. 30 (4): 895–896. doi:10.2307/2493873. ISSN 0037-6779. JSTOR 2493873. S2CID 164613462. (a general work)
- Hansen, Chris: Enfant Terrible: The Times and Schemes of General Elliott Roosevelt. Able Baker, Tucson, 2012. ISBN 9780615668925. OCLC 830124072.
- Infield, Glenn: The Poltava Affair. McMillan, New York, 1973. OCLC 628028
- Malayney, Norman: The 25th Bomb Group (Rcn) in World War II. Schiffer Military History, Atglen, PA, 2011. ISBN 978-0-7643-3950-9
- Plokhy, Serhii (2019). Forgotten Bastards of the Eastern Front: An untold story of World War II. London: Allen Lane (Penguin) & Oxford University Press. ISBN 978-0-241-40456-0.
