= 427th Special Operations Squadron =

427th Special Operations Squadron

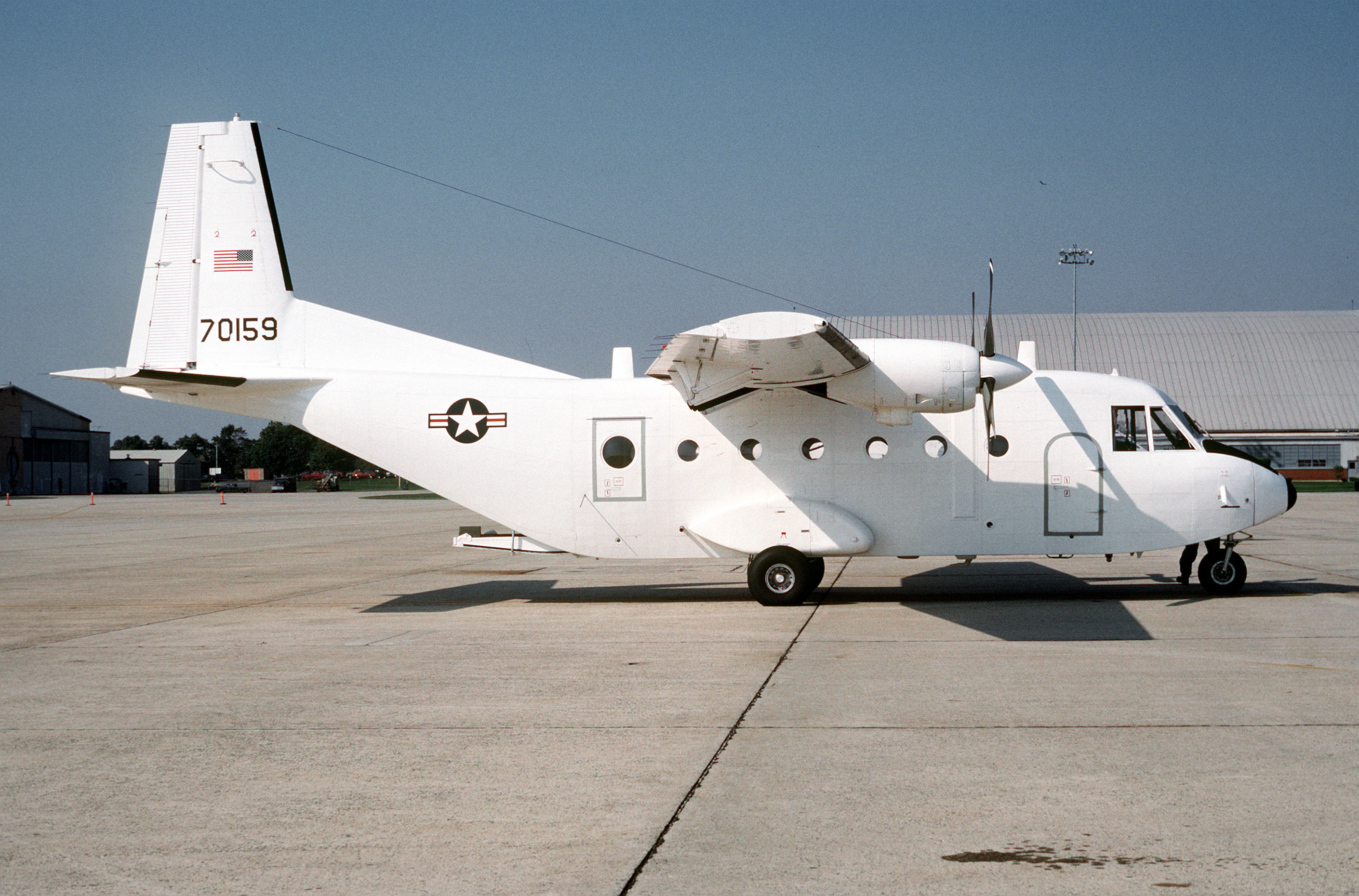
- The Spanish CASA C-212-200 (C-41A) is an aircraft capable of inserting and extracting SOF via short runways. It may be employed by the 427th Special Operations Squadron
- Active: 1944–1945, 1970–1972
- Country: United States
- Branch: United States Air Force
- Type: Squadron
- Role: Special Operations
- Garrison/HQ: Pope Field, NC
- Engagements: World War II EAME Theater; World War II Asiatic-Pacific Theater; Iran War; 2026 United States F-15E rescue operation in Iran

Insignia
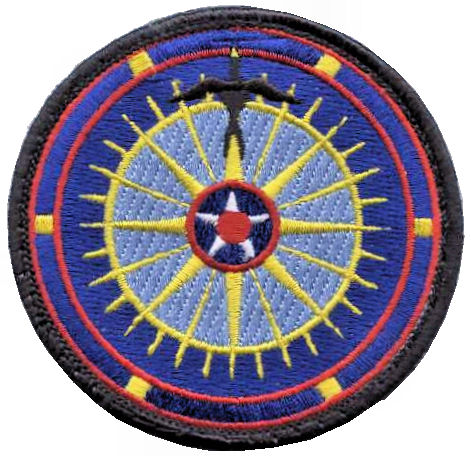
- 427th Special Operations Squadron emblem

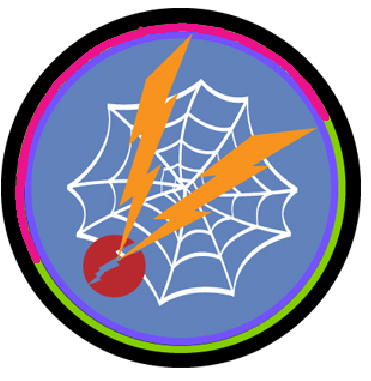
- 427th Night Fighter Squadron emblem (Note: Approved 30 April 1945)

The 427th Special Operations Squadron is a specialized, covert unit of the United States Air Force. After reporter Andreas Parsch filed a Freedom of Information Act request, the Air Force told him the unit "support[s] training requirements ... for infiltration and exfiltration." That is, it prepares troops for secretly slipping into and out of dangerous territory. The squadron is not listed by the Air Force Historical Research Agency. It is reported by the press to be stationed at Pope Field, North Carolina.

The squadron was originally formed during World War II as the 427th Night Fighter Squadron. Its planned mission to defend United States Army Air Forces bases in the Soviet Union was cancelled when the Soviets did not allow the unit to be based in Ukraine SSR during the Operation Frantic shuttle bombing missions that took place in 1944. It later served in Italy, India, Southern China and Burma as a Northrop P-61 Black Widow night fighter interceptor squadron.

The squadron was reactivated during the Vietnam War to train Republic of Vietnam Air Force pilots in using the Cessna A-37 Dragonfly in counterinsurgency operations. Its most recent activation may involve counterinsurgency and counter-terrorist operations as part of Air Force Special Operations Command.

== Mission ==
The 427th is a clandestine unit which the Air Force discloses little information about. According to news reports, it may provide Short Takeoff and Landing and tactically qualified crews to support training requirements for the US Army Special Operations Forces (SOF) community. It may support the United States Army Special Operations Command, the United States Army Special Forces Command, and the John F. Kennedy Special Warfare Center and School.

It is believed that the 427th provides US Army SOF personnel the opportunity to train on various types of aircraft for infiltration and exfiltration that they may encounter in the lesser developed countries in which they provide training. If this is factual, then 427th aircrews must be proficient in smaller types of aircraft in order to familiarize US Army personnel with their characteristics, peculiarities, and capabilities.

The Army's 160th Special Operations Aviation Regiment (Airborne) (A) uses rotary wing platforms (Sikorsky MH-60 Black Hawk, Boeing MH-47, MD Helicopters MH-6 Little Bird/AH-6). Air Force Special Operations Command primarily uses fixed-wing aircraft (Lockheed MC-130, Lockheed AC-130, CASA C-212 Aviocar (C-41A)) with the exception of its Bell Boeing CV-22 Osprey's. The 427th likely uses non-standard airframes that are usually found in third world or former eastern bloc nations.

== History ==
The 427th Night Fighter Squadron was formed at Hammer Field, California, where its crews were trained. The squadron also flew training missions in the Bakersfield area. With their training as a unit completed, personnel of the 427th packed their bags and left California's sunny San Joaquin Valley in mid-July 1944. Initially traveling by ship from the east coast to Casablanca, French Morocco. Once the squadron's planes were assembled and checked out, the unit flew east to Cairo, Egypt, where they expected orders for Poltava Airfield, Ukraine on the Soviet Eastern Front.

=== The Russian Front and the Mediterranean ===
The expected mission on the Russian Front was to provide night fighter escort and air defense for Eighth and Fifteenth Air Force Boeing B-17 Flying Fortress bombers on "shuttle" missions from their bases in England and Italy to targets in Eastern Europe as part of Operation Frantic. However, a Luftwaffe night attack on the Soviet Air Force bases where the bombers landed in Ukrainian SSR on 21 June 1944 created mass havoc and destroyed many aircraft on the ground. The Soviets refused to allow American night fighters to defend the bomber bases, insisting that air defense was their responsibility, the 427th's orders to Poltava were scrubbed.

Instead, the 427th was to join the four Bristol Beaufighter equipped night fighter squadrons of the Twelfth Air Force in the Mediterranean area. After about a week's stay in Cairo, the air echelon departed and arrived at the 19th Replacement Depot outside Naples, Italy. Their new assignment was to provide night air defense from Pomigliano Airfield, which started upon their arrival on 3 September. Their stay was short, as on 20 September the 427th was given orders to relocate to the China-Burma-India Theater of Operations and join the Tenth Air Force in India.

Although the 427th was in operation in the Naples area for less than three weeks, it was able to fly a number of missions and had contacts with Luftwaffe reconnaissance aircraft from northern Italy. On one of these missions, a radar malfunction experienced just before coming into firing range prevented possible destruction of the German aircraft. On the other mission in which contact was made, the attack was cut short when the Naples antiaircraft defenses tried to help and nearly shot down the 427th's Northrop P-61 Black Widow.

=== China-Burma-India Theater ===
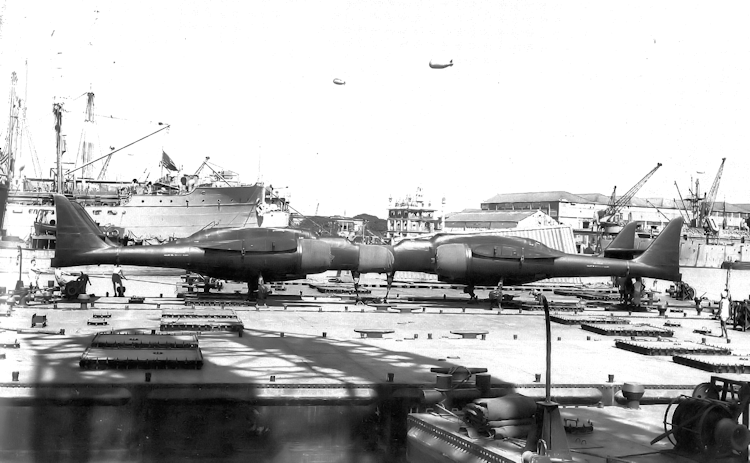
427th Night Fighter Squadron P-61 Black Widows arriving at Calcutta, India, 1944

Arriving in India, the squadron cooperated closely with the 426th Night Fighter Squadron. The 426th, with only four operational Black Widows, needed additional aircraft for their Chengtu Airfield, China operations. A deal was struck between the commanding officers of the two squadrons in which the 427th would give the 426th eight of its twelve aircraft in exchange for the 426th's aircraft at the depot at Karachi, where two were assembled and six were being assembled. At this time, the 427th was assigned to Pandaveswar Airfield in West Bengal.

On 28 November, another contingent of the 427th arrived at Myitkyina Airfield, Burma. More of the squadron arrived during December, basically by truck over the Ledo Road from their headquarters in India, to prepare Myitkyina as the squadron's new headquarters where they would remain until May 1945.

During December, the 427th's small detachment of three P-61s at Myitkyina saw all there was of aerial "action." They participated in seventeen combat missions. Three were patrols ordered by higher headquarters, two were due to enemy aircraft in the area.

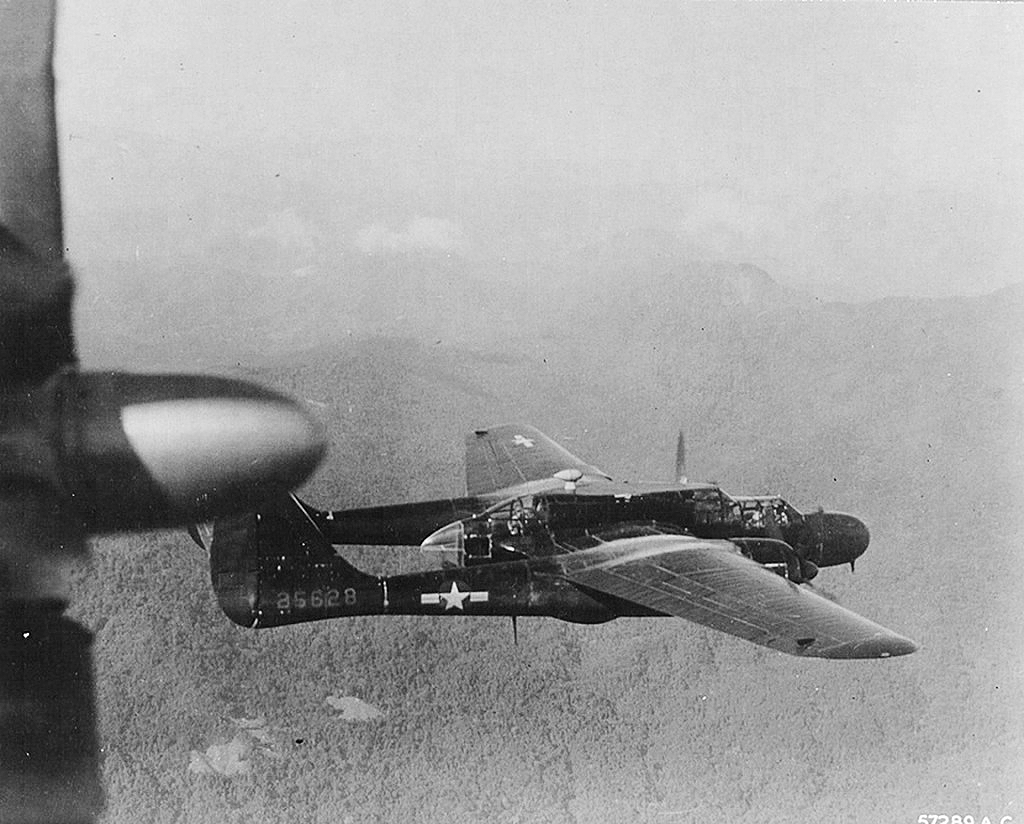
P-61A Black Widow of the 427th Night Fighter Squadron in flight over Northern Burma, 1944 (Note: Aircraft is Northrop P-61A-10-NO Black Widow, serial 42-5628.)

On 25 December 1944, a detachment of the 427th arrived at Kunming Airport, China, relieving the 426th's detachment, although the bulk of the squadron remained in Burma. During January 1945, they flew patrols over Myitkyina and Bhamo and twelve local tactical interceptions. No enemy aircraft was encountered. Unfortunately for the 427th, one of those misfortunes of war occurred. On 22 January, one of its aircraft in the China detachment operating out of Suichwan Airfield in southeast China shot down a US Consolidated C-87 Liberator Express (a transport version of the Liberator bomber) with a crew of nine. The C-87 was in a prohibited area and made no radio calls, which led to the conclusion that it was hostile.

From this point on, Japanese night flying nearly ceased. The 427th flew more and more night intruder missions. It modified its aircraft to carry a three-tube bazooka-type rocket launcher under each wing. With its rocket-carrying P-61s, it operated against Japanese forces from its bases at Myitkyina in Burma as well as Kunming in China. 427th intruder missions started on 22 February with a sweep of the road network south of Lashio, Burma. The squadron flew seven night intruder sorties that month. In mid-March, day and night offensive reconnaissance missions covered Pangkeyhtu/Loi-lem/Ho-pong/Namsang road network. Thirty-three-day and night patrols were accomplished that month. Missions planned to originate from Kunming and Chihkiang Airfield were curtailed in April because of a shortage of fuel.

Squadron headquarters moved from Burma to Kisselbarri, near Dinjan, India, in late May. The detachment at Kunming China remained there, operating elements from Dinjan Airfield, India; Chengkung Airfield and Nanning Airport in China until the war's end. Activity increased in July, with the squadron claiming 155 sampans destroyed and fifty-two damaged in addition to numerous warehouses, barges, trains and trucks destroyed. Besides flying day and night intruder sorties, two special medical supply airdrop sorties were flown in a Vultee BT-13 Valiant aircraft.

On 13 August 1945, the 427th was ordered to move to Liuchow Airfield, China. The air echelon flew there immediately while the ground echelon began the movement by road. With the war over, the air echelon was ordered to fly to Yangkai Airfield, China, to turn in their aircraft for 'pickling' (preparation for storage) and start processing home. All aircraft were turned in at Yangkai, on 29 August. The 427th Night Fighter Squadron was inactivated on 13 October 1945.

=== Vietnam War ===
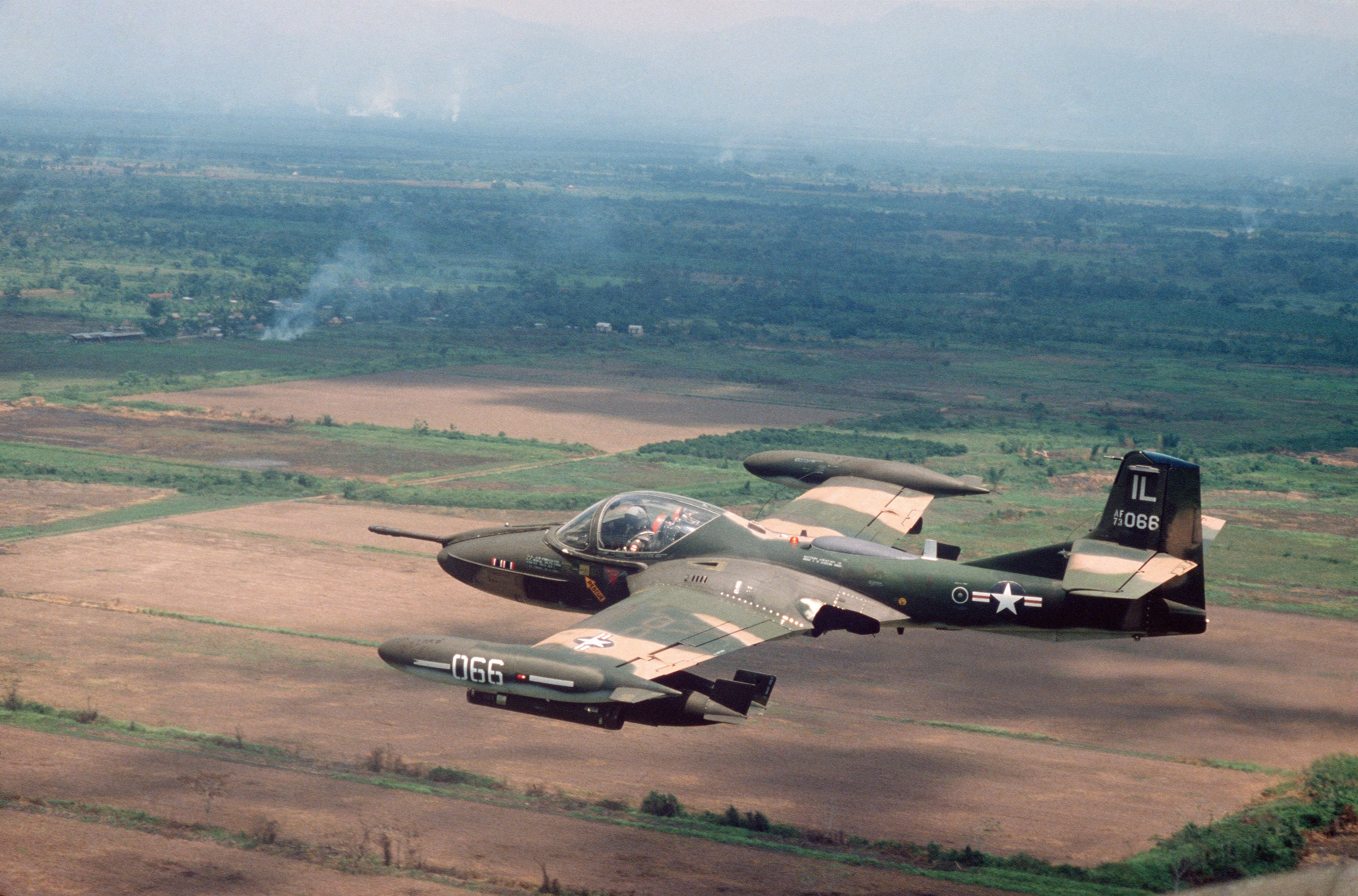
Cessna OA-37B

The 427th Special Operations Training Squadron was with Tactical Air Command, stationed at England Air Force Base, Louisiana on 1 July 1970. The squadron's mission was to provide transition training to Republic of Vietnam Air Force pilots for the Cessna OA-37B Dragonfly counterinsurgency aircraft to combat guerrilla type activity. The standard A-37 aircraft was fitted with a refueling probe in the nose; reticulated foam was added to the self-sealing fuel tanks to protect against fire or explosions if hit by incendiary anti-aircraft rounds. The cockpit was armor-plated, and the undercarriage was strengthened to carry greater weight and to enable the aircraft to operate off rough remote airstrips. The squadron was inactivated on 15 July 1972

== Lineage ==
- Constituted as the 427th Night Fighter Squadron on 19 January 1944

Activated on 1 February 1944
Inactivated on 29 October 1945

- Redesignated as the 427th Special Operations Training Squadron and activated on 1 July 1970

Inactivated 15 July 1972

- Redesignated 427th Special Operations Squadron and activated, undetermined

=== Assignments ===
- IV Fighter Command (attached to 481st Night Fighter Operational Training Group, 1 February 1944
- Tenth Air Force, 11 June 1944
- Twelfth Air Force, September 1944 (attached to 62nd Fighter Wing)
- Army Air Forces India-Burma Sector, 2 October 1944
- Tenth Air Force, 13 December 1944
- Fourteenth Air Force, 24 August – 29 October 1945

4410th Special Operations Training Group, 1 July 1970 – 15 July 1972

- Air Force Special Operations Command, (date undetermined)

2026 United States F-15E rescue operation in Iran, April 2026

=== Stations ===
- Hammer Field, California, 1 February 1944
- Meadows Field, California, 1 May – 12 July 1944
- Pomigliano Airfield, Italy, 12 August – 20 September 1944
- Pandaveswar Airfield, India, 31 October 1944 (detachments at Myitkyina Airfield, Burma after 13 November 1944) (detachment at Kunming Airport, China, after 18 December 1944)
- Myitkyina Airfield, Burma, c. 23 December 1944 (detachment at Kunming Airport, China)
- Dinjan Airfield, India, 25 May 1945 (detachment at Kunming Airport, China until 28 June 1945, Chengkung Airfield, China from 29 June 1945)
- Nanning airport, China, 26 July 1945 (detachments at Kunming Airport, China, Chengkung Airfield, China)
- Liuchow Airfield, China, 13 August 1945 (detachment at Chengkung Airfield, China until c. 16 August 1945)
- India (Undetermined location), September–October 1945
- Camp Kilmer, New Jersey, 28–29 October 1945
- England Air Force Base, Louisiana, 1 July 1970 – 15 July 1972
- Pope Field, undetermined - present

=== Aircraft ===
- Douglas P-70 Havoc, 1944
- Northrop P-61 Black Widow, 1944–1945
- Cessna OA-37B Dragonfly, 1970–1972
- CASA/IPTN CN-235M-100, undetermined - present
- Airbus C295W, undetermined - present
- Boeing C-40D, undetermined - present
