= List of airports in Romania =

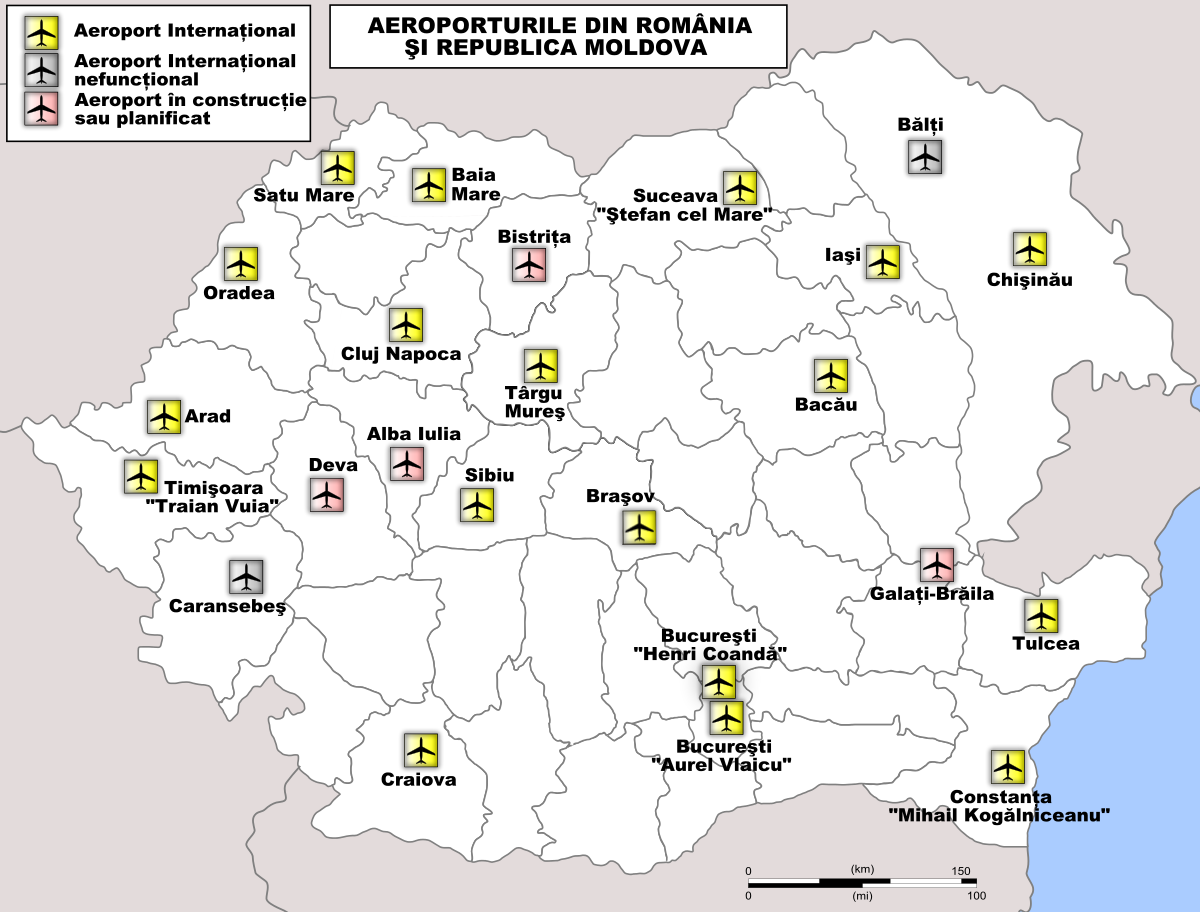
Map of public airports in Romania and Moldova (2023)

This is a list of airports in Romania, grouped by type and sorted by location.

== Airports ==
Airport names shown in bold indicate the airport has scheduled service on commercial airlines.

| City served | ICAO | IATA | Airport name | Frequency | Status |
|---|---|---|---|---|---|
| | | | **Public airports** | | |
| Arad | LRAR | ARW | Arad International Airport | APP 123.530 TWR 118.230 TWR ALTN 130.200 | |
| Bacău | LRBC | BCM | **Bacău "George Enescu" International Airport** | TWR 120.980 | |
| Baia Mare / Tăuții-Măgherăuș | LRBM | BAY | **Baia Mare Airport** (Tăuții-Măgherăuș Airport) | TWR 118.855 TWR ALTN 118.100 | |
| Brașov / Ghimbav | LRBV | GHV | **Brașov-Ghimbav International Airport** | TWR/APP 118.630 TWR ALTN 120.135 | |
| Bucharest / Băneasa | LRBS | BBU | **Bucharest "Aurel Vlaicu" International Airport** (formerly Băneasa Airport) | APP 119.415 TWR 125.205 GND 129.950 | |
| Bucharest / Otopeni | LROP | OTP | **Bucharest "Henri Coandă" International Airport** (formerly Otopeni Airport) | APP 119.415 TWR 118.805 GND 121.855 DEL 121.955 | |
| Caransebeș | LRCS | CSB | Caransebeș Airport | TWR 118.880 MHz | |
| Cluj-Napoca | LRCL | CLJ | **Cluj "Avram Iancu" International Airport** | APP 126.430 TWR 118.705 | |
| Constanța | LRCK | CND | **Constanța "Mihail Kogălniceanu" International Airport** | APP 122.905 TWR 124.030 | |
| Craiova | LRCV | CRA | **Craiova Airport** | TWR 129.530 | |
| Iași | LRIA | IAS | **Iași International Airport** | TWR 119.955 | |
| Oradea | LROD | OMR | **Oradea International Airport** | TWR 118.455 | |
| Satu Mare | LRSM | SUJ | **Satu Mare International Airport** | TWR 119.655 | |
| Sibiu | LRSB | SBZ | **Sibiu International Airport** | APP 126.430 TWR 121.305 | |
| Suceava | LRSV | SCV | **Suceava "Ștefan cel Mare" International Airport** | TWR 129.955 TWR ALTN 118.300 | |
| Târgu Mureș | LRTM | TGM | **"Transilvania" Târgu Mureș Airport** | APP 126.430 TWR 119.180 | |
| Timișoara | LRTR | TSR | **Timișoara "Traian Vuia" International Airport** (Giarmata Airport) | APP 123.530 TWR 120.105 | |
| Tulcea | LRTC | TCE | "Delta Dunarii" Tulcea Airport (Cataloi Airport) | TWR 119.755 TWR ALTN 120.300 | |
| | | | **Military airfields** | | |
| Alexeni | | | Alexeni Airfield (or Bucharest Alexeni Airport) | | Not in use |
| Boboc | LRBO | | Boboc Airfield | TWR 125.400 | |
| Câmpia Turzii | LRCT | | Câmpia Turzii Airfield (Luna Airfield) | | |
| Fetești | LRFT | | Fetești Airfield (Borcea Airfield) | TWR 122.100 | |
| Ianca | | | Ianca Airfield | | Not in use |
| Siliștea Gumești | | | Siliștea Gumești Airfield | | Not in use |
| | | | **Other airfields and airports** | | |
| Balta Verde / Craiova | LRCW | | Balta Verde Airfield, 44°16'59"N 23°47'42"E | 123.5 MHz | |
| Bistrița | LRBN | | Bistrița Airfield, 47°09'30"N 24°33'06"E | 131.65 MHz | |
| Buziaș | | | Buziaș Airfield, 45°39'11"N 21°34'34"E | | |
| Ciolpani | | | Ciolpani Airfield | 122.1 MHz | |
| Cisnădie / Sibiu | LRCD | | Măgura Airfield, 45°44'21"N 24°9'50"E | 122.7 MHz | |
| Clinceni / București | LRCN | | Clinceni Airfield, 44°21'38"N 25°55'54"E | 123.5 MHz | |
| Comana / București / Giurgiu | | | Comana Airfield, 44°12'01"N 26°08'23"E | 123.45 MHz | |
| Dăbâca / Cluj | | | Dăbâca Airfield, 46°59'11"N 23°40'20"E | 123.45 MHz | |
| Brașov | | | Cobrex Helipad, 45°39'26"N 25°33'19"E | | |
| Crasna / Zalău | | | Crasna Airfield, 47°10'04"N 22°51'21"E | | |
| Cluj / Dezmir | | | Dezmir Airfield, Cluj, 46°46'45"N 23°42'43"E | 119.875 MHz | |
| Dorna Candrenilor / Vatra Dornei | | | | 123.45 MHz | |
| Drobeta-Turnu Severin | | | Drobeta Airfield, 44°34'48"N 22°50'35"E | 123.450 MHz | |
| Galați | | | Pegas Airfield, 45°30'10"N 28°01'50"E | | |
| Geamăna / Pitești | LRPT | | Geamăna Airfield, 44°48'58"N 24°53'43"E | 135.210 MHz | |
| Ghimbav / Brașov | LRBG | | Ghimbav Airfield, 45°41'51'"N 25°32'2"E | 128.7 MHz | |
| Iași | LRIS | | Iași Airfield, 47°09'26"N 27°38'05"E | 128.3 MHz | |
| Ineu / Oradea | | | King Land Ineu Airfield, 47°04'37"N 22°06'08"E | | |
| Luncani | | | Lac Luncani Airfield, 46°28'55"N 23°55'51"E | | |
| Remetea / Harghita | LRHR | QRG | Remetea Airfield, 46°49'21.20"N, 25°24'25.72"E | | |
| Salcea / Suceava | | | Salcea Airfield | 123.60 MHz | |
| Sălicea | | | Sălicea Airfield, 46°41'0"N 23°30'28"E | | |
| Săulești / Deva | LRDV | DVA | Săulești Airfield, 45°51'51"N 22°57'54"E | 119.70 MHz | |
| Sânpetru / Brașov | LRSP | | Sânpetru Airfield, 45°43'8"N 25°38'1"E | 119.70 MHz | |
| Slobozia Moara / Dambovita | | | Slobozia Moara Airfield, 44°35'43.02"N, 25°45'39.10"E | | |
| Strejnicu / Ploiești | LRPV | | Strejnicu Airfield, 44°55'23"N 25°58'11"E | 118.4 MHz | |
| Șirna / Ploiești | | | Șirna Airfield, 44°47'3"N 25°58'56"E | 123.45 MHz | |
| Târgu Mureș | LRMS | | Târgu Mureș Airfield, 46°32'03"N 24°32'05"E | 123.5 MHz | |
| Timișoara | | | Cioca Airfield, 45°47′20″N 21°11′40″E (Aeroportul Utilitar Timișoara) | | |
| Turnișor / Sibiu | | | Turnișor Airfield | 123.6 MHz | |
| Tuzla / Costinești / Eforie Sud | LRTZ | | Tuzla Airfield, 43°59'08"N 28°36'53"E | 131.475 MHz | |
| Topoloveni / Argeș | | | Topoloveni Airfield, 44°47'38"N 25°05'13"E | 123.6 MHz | |
| Vadeni / Braila | | | Vadeni Airfield, 45°21'47.2"N 27°56'28.6"E | | |

=== Defunct ===
The Galați Airport operated in the city of Galați from 1926 to 1958.

The Pipera Airport operated in the city of Bucharest from 1921 to 1958.

== Traffic ==
| Rank | Airport | City | Code (IATA/ICAO) | 2014 | 2015 | 2016 | 2017 | Change 2016/2017 |
|---|---|---|---|---|---|---|---|---|
| 1. | Henri Coandă International Airport | Bucharest | OTP/LROP | 8,316,705 | 9,282,884 | 10,982,967 | 12,804,191 | ▲16.9% |
| 2. | Cluj Avram Iancu International Airport | Cluj-Napoca | CLJ/LRCL | 1,182,047 | 1,487,603 | 1,884,645 | 2,688,731 | ▲42.9% |
| 3. | Traian Vuia International Airport | Timișoara | TSR/LRTR | 735,058 | 924,463 | 1,161,612 | 1,621,529 | ▲39.7% |
| 4. | Iași International Airport | Iași | IAS/LRIA | 273,047 | 376,865 | 881,157 | 1,147,040 | ▲30.1% |
| 5. | Sibiu International Airport | Sibiu | SBZ/LRSB | 250,400 | 307,026 | 390,688 | 503,906 | ▲36.6% |
| 6. | Craiova International Airport | Craiova | CRA/LRCV | 138,886 | 116,947 | 222,320 | 447,571 | ▲101.1% |
| 7. | George Enescu International Airport | Bacău | BCM/LRBC | 313,376 | 364,492 | 414,676 | 425,733 | ▲3.8% |
| 8. | Ștefan cel Mare International Airport | Suceava | SCV/LRSV | 219 | 2,359 | 57,226 | 262,165 | ▲359.4% |
| 9. | Oradea Airport | Oradea | OMR/LROD | 36,501 | 8,118 | 41,867 | 162,902 | ▲289% |
| 10. | Mihail Kogălniceanu International Airport | Constanța | CND/LRCK | 37,939 | 63,329 | 94,594 | 127,635 | ▲28% |
| 11. | Satu Mare International Airport | Satu Mare | SUJ/LRSM | 12,644 | 17,212 | 23,796 | 60,795 | ▲155.48% |
| 12. | Tuzla Airfield | Tuzla, Constanța | LRTZ | 20,831 | 0 | 0 | 16,077 | ▲3% |
| 13. | Arad International Airport | Arad | ARW/LRAR | 28,280 | 8,530 | 0 | 10,817 | ▲ N/A |
| 14. | Aurel Vlaicu International Airport | Bucharest | BBU/LRBS | 4,960 | 12,925 | 5,375 | 5,645 | ▲1.9% |
| 15. | Danube Delta Tulcea Airport | Tulcea | TCE/LRTC | 1,221 | 394 | 1,057 | 4,232 | ▲333% |
| 16. | Transilvania Airport | Târgu Mureș | TGM/LRTM | 343,521 | 336,694 | 287,412 | 748 | ▼99.7% |
| 17. | Baia Mare Airport | Baia Mare | BAY/LRBM | 20,465 | 17,169 | 0 | 44 | |
| Total | | | | 11,661,696 | 13,290,442 | 16,449,412 | | ▲23.8% |

== History ==
| Rank | Airport | City | First aviation activities | Military activities | Commercial activities | First concrete runway | International Status | Closed |
|---|---|---|---|---|---|---|---|---|
| 1. | Henri Coandă International Airport | Bucharest | 1940 | 1940-present | 1965-present | 1943 | 1970-present | in use |
| 2. | Cluj Avram Iancu International Airport | Cluj-Napoca | 1917 | 1917-1932; 1940-1948 | 1928-1940; 1948-present | 1965 | 1933-1940; 1996-present | in use |
| 3. | Traian Vuia International Airport | Timișoara | 1915 | 1915-1919; 1942-1976 | 1935-1942; 1964-present | 1953 | 1980-present | in use |
| 4. | Iași International Airport | Iași | 1905 | none | 1926-present | 1969 | 2001-present | in use |
| 5. | Sibiu International Airport | Sibiu | 1943 | 1943-1944 | 1943-present | 1970 | 1992-present | in use |
| 6. | Craiova International Airport | Craiova | 1938 | 1938-1957 | 1957-present | 1952 | 1995-present | in use |
| 7. | George Enescu International Airport | Bacău | 1917 | 1995-present | 1946-present | 1971 | 1975-present | in use |
| 8. | Ștefan cel Mare International Airport | Suceava | 1962 | none | 1962-present | 1963 | 2005-present | in use |
| 9. | Oradea Airport | Oradea | 1910 | 1915-1946 | 1938-present | 1967 | 2011-present | in use |
| 10. | Mihail Kogălniceanu International Airport | Constanța | 1931 | 1941-present | 1934-1941; 1960-present | 1965 | 1961-present | in use |
| 11. | Satu Mare International Airport | Satu Mare | 1936 | 1940-1946; 1949-1948 | 1938-1940; 1946-1949; 1958-present | 1975 | 1996-present | in use |
| 12. | Tuzla Airfield | Tuzla, Constanța | 1967 | 1967-1999 | 1999-present | 2024 | 2016-present | in use |
| 13. | Arad International Airport | Arad | 1912 | 1940-1946 | 1937-1941; 1946-present | 1953 | 1922-1941; 1960-present | in use |
| 14. | Aurel Vlaicu International Airport | Bucharest | 1909 | 1912-1965 | 1920-present | 1942 | 1922-1970; 1997-present | in use |
| 15. | Danube Delta Tulcea Airport | Tulcea | 1952 | none | 1952-present | 1973 | 2009-present | in use |
| 16. | Transilvania Airport | Târgu Mureș | 1912 | 1940-1946 | 1936-1940; 1946-present | 1969 | 2006-present | in use |
| 17. | Baia Mare Airport | Baia Mare | 1929 | 1938-1966 | 1951-present | 1966 | 2002-present | in use |
| 18. | Bucharest-Pipera | Bucharest | 1915 | 1915-1958 | 1921-1958 | none | 1921-1946 | 1958 |
| 19. | Galați Airport | Galați | 1920 | 1920-1958 | 1926-1958 | none | none | 1958 |

== See also ==
- List of airports by ICAO code: L#LR – Romania
- List of the busiest airports in Romania
- Aviation in Romania
- Romanian Air Force
- Transport in Romania
- Wikipedia:WikiProject Aviation/Airline destination lists: Europe#Romania
