= Wilhelm Antrup =

- Born: 1 February 1910; Tecklenburg
- Died: 14 November 1984 (aged 74)
- Military career
- Allegiance: Nazi Germany; West Germany
- Branch: Luftwaffe; German Air Force
- Service years: 1935–45; 1956–68
- Rank: Oberstleutnant (Wehrmacht); Brigadegeneral (Bundeswehr)
- Commands: Kampfgeschwader 55
- Conflicts: World War II
- Awards: Knight's Cross of the Iron Cross with Oak Leaves

Wilhelm Antrup (1 February 1910 – 14 November 1984) was a German air general.

During the Nazi era, he served in the Luftwaffe and was a recipient of the Knight's Cross of the Iron Cross with Oak Leaves. In June 1944, Oberstleutnant Antrup led Operation Zaunkoenig, the German bombing and subsequent destruction of the U.S. bomber force deployed to Ukraine to carry out shuttle air raids on Nazi Germany and its allies, known as Operation Frantic. In 1956, joined the post war German Air Force of the newly-founded Bundeswehr. In 1964, he became commander of the Höhere Technische Schule der Luftwaffe (Higher Technical School of the Luftwaffe), which was reorganized to the Technische Akademie der Luftwaffe (Technical Academy of the Luftwaffe) on 1 June 1966. His rank was Brigadegeneral. Antrup was retired in March 1968.

== Awards and decorations ==
- German Cross in Gold (2 January 1942)
- Knight's Cross of the Iron Cross with Oak Leaves
  - Knight's Cross on 13 November 1942 as Hauptmann and Staffelkapitän of the 5./Kampfgeschwader 55
  - 655th Oak Leaves on 18 November 1944 as Oberstleutnant and Geschwaderkommodore of Kampfgeschwader 55

Military offices
Preceded by Oberstleutnant Dr. Ernst Kühl	Commander of Kampfgeschwader 55; 8 August 1943 - 1 October 1944	Succeeded by None
