= Poltava Air Base =

Military airfield in Ukraine

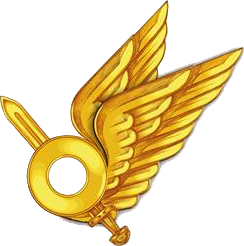
Poltava Air Base
- Авіабаза «Полтава»
- Poltava, Poltava Oblast in Ukraine
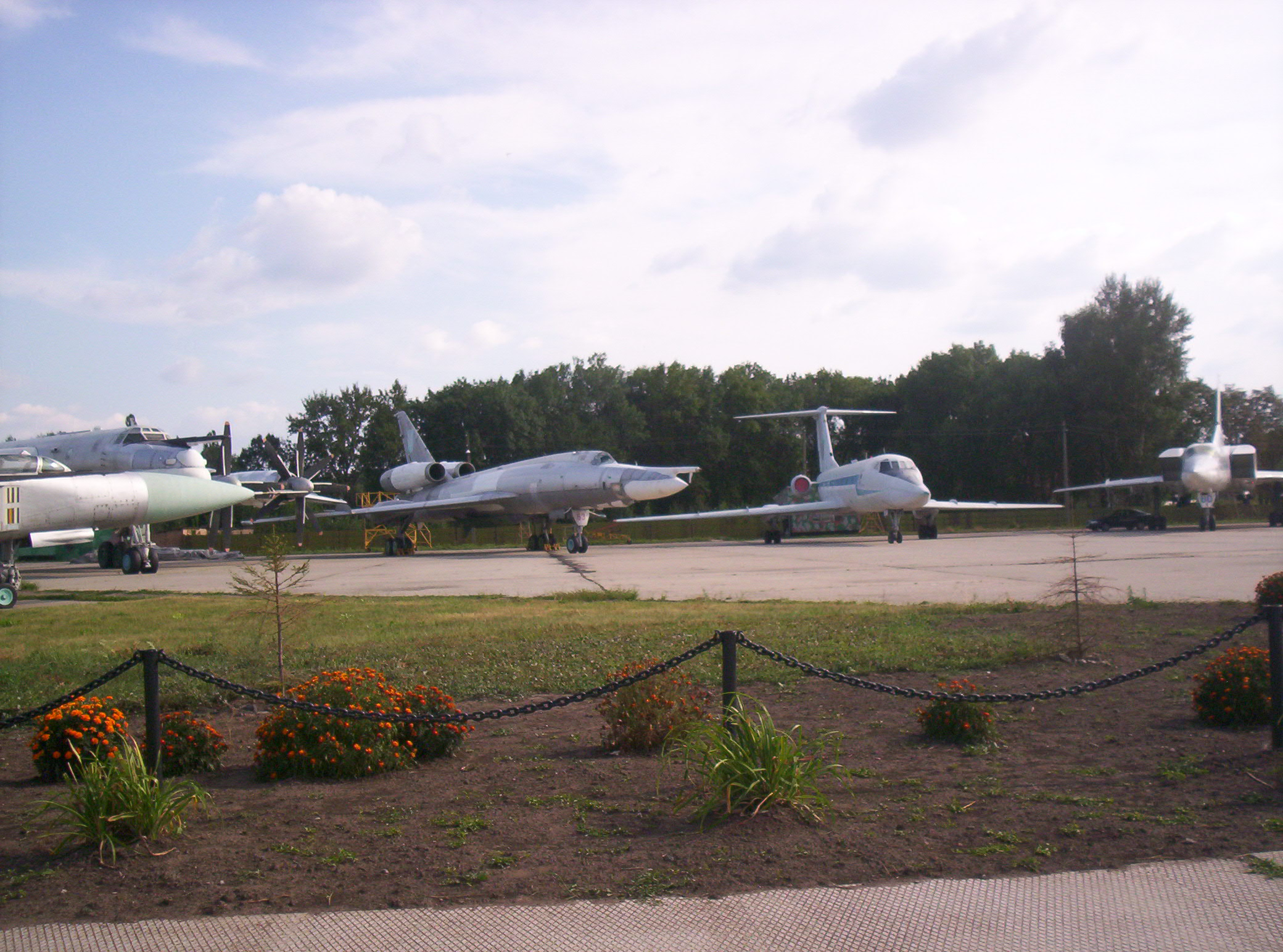

Site information
- Type: Air Base
- Owner: Ministry of Defence
- Operator: Ukrainian Army Aviation

Location
- Shown within Poltava Oblast Poltava (Ukraine)
- Coordinates: 49°37′37″N 034°29′11″E

Site history
- Built: 1936
- In use: 1936 - present

Airfield information
- Identifiers: ICAO: UKHL
- Elevation: 10 metres (33 ft) AMSL
Runways
Direction	Length and surface
08/26	2,500 metres (8,202 ft) Concrete

Poltava Air Base (Ukrainian: Авіабаза «Полтава», Russian: Авиабаза «Полтава») is a military airfield located approximately 8 km (5.0 mi) northwest of Poltava, Ukraine. It is one of two airfields near Poltava, the other being Poltava Airport.

== History ==
In 1936 the Poltava airfield became a base for Soviet military aviation.

=== World War II ===
German forces occupied the Poltava area from September 1941 until September 1943 as part of Reichskommissariat Ukraine. The Luftwaffe maintained a regional headquarters at the airfield, and Adolf Hitler visited on one occasion (1 June 1942). When they evacuated the area, the Germans placed 12 500-lb bombs connected to a distant, concealed HF-antenna under the main building. (Nearby structures had been largely destroyed.) The bomb was discovered when Soviet-American forces re-commissioned the base in spring 1944.

In February 1944 the Soviets provided the field to the United States Army Air Forces as a heavy-bomber staging-field for use by the Eighth and Fifteenth Air Forces in shuttle-bombing missions against German-held territory (Operation Frantic, June to September 1944). After an intense construction season with increasing American presence, the field was declared ready for U.S. bomber use at the end of May 1944. A high-level USAAF team led by General Frederick Anderson (accompanied by Colonel Elliott Roosevelt and others) inspected the base that month. The runways comprised Marsden steel matting imported from the United States, and the fuel depot was filled with high-octane aviation gasoline from the U.S. A Soviet fighter regiment and several support aircraft were stationed at the field.

Poltava was designated as USAAF Station 559 and became headquarters, Eastern Command, headed by General Alfred Kessler. Two smaller nearby U.S. fields, also along the Kiev railway, were Mirgorod and Pyriatyn (Stations 561 and 560).

Operation Frantic began with 325th Reconnaissance Wing flights from England and Italy in late May 1944, and a photo lab and reconnaissance detachment with a few F-5 Lightnings were based at Poltava. Bombing runs (FRANTIC-1) began from Italy (15th Air Force) on 2 June 1944, returning four days later. The concept of operations was for American aircraft to use England (8th Air Force), Italy, and the Ukrainian bases as vertices of a triangular bombing campaign against Axis targets in Eastern Europe and the Balkans.

Difficulties for the US forces began almost immediately, with a good example being how Joseph Stalin promised US military leaders that the Soviets would handle all air base defenses. Stalin's idea of airbase defense consisted of truck-mounted .50 caliber machine-guns. Stalin's airbase defense strategy proved entirely ineffective on the night of 21 June when a Luftwaffe attack on the base proved an entire success, as not a single Luftwaffe plane was shot down by the .50 cal truck-mounted machine-guns supplied by Stalin for defense.

After seven distinct FRANTIC shuttle operations, bombing missions of Operation Frantic ended in September 1944. At that time, increasing inter-Allied hostility and a decreasing need for the Ukrainian bases caused the USAAF to consolidate at Poltava and to reduce the base there to a caretaker status. U.S. personnel there declined from a peak of about 1,300 to around 300. American command and maintenance personnel of Operation Frantic remained at Poltava until 22 June 1945 according to operation commander Brigadier General William L. Ritchie. That is the date that he and the last remaining American military personnel left Poltava to attend a victory-parade celebration in Moscow as propaganda guests of Stalin the next day. Most Americans exited via Tehran, the same way they had arrived.

=== German Air Attack ===
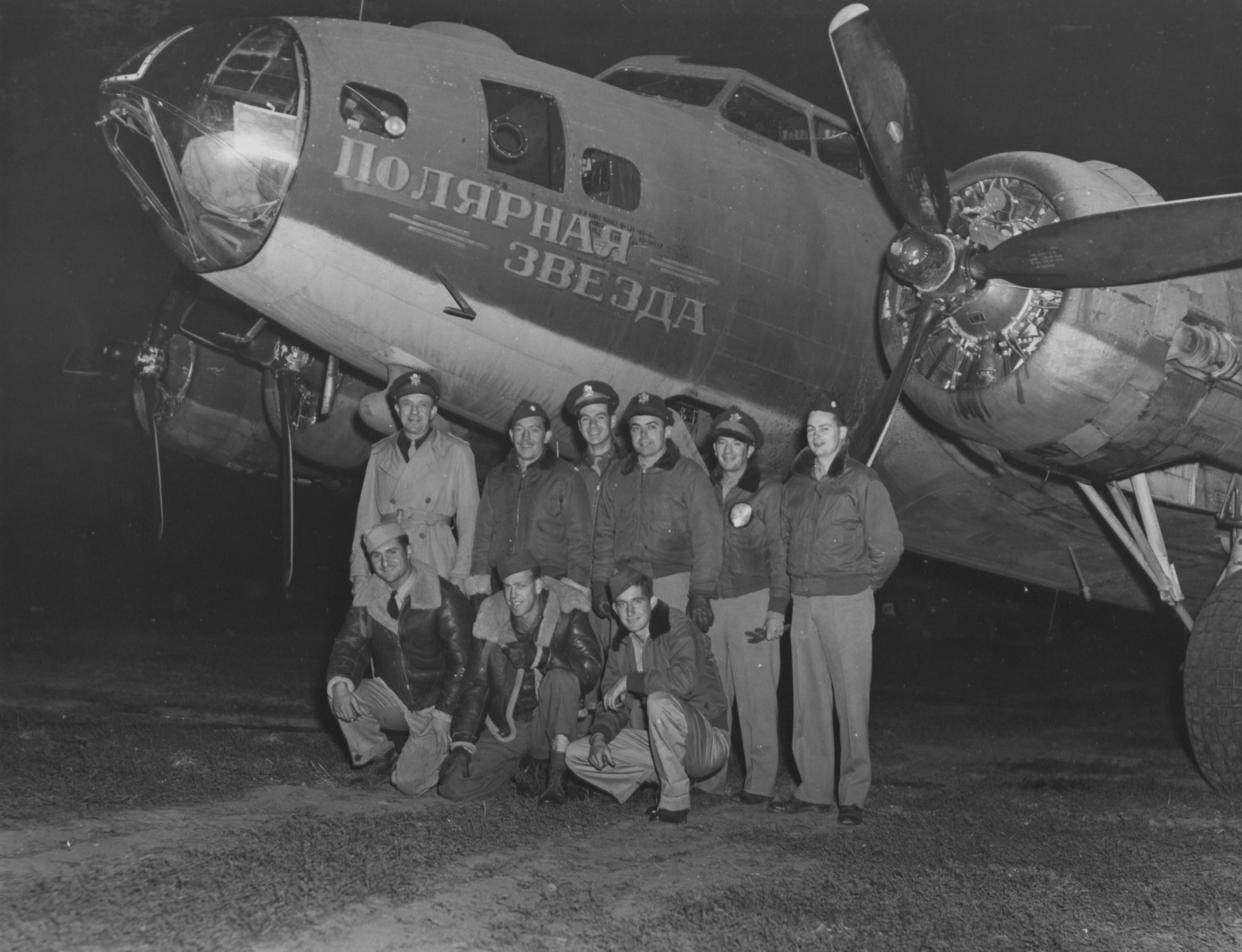
Brigadier General Kessler and B-17 crew members in Poltava Airbase Oct 1944

Spirited celebrations at Poltava during FRANTIC-1 marked the high point of U.S.-Soviet air cooperation. FRANTIC-2, which arrived from England late on 21 June, triggered equal euphoria that ended abruptly with air raid warnings beginning around midnight. Personnel retreated to new slit trenches distant from the aircraft parking area. For this reason, U.S. personnel losses were limited to two killed and several wounded in the subsequent German air attack.

About eighty German aircraft combined in one of history's most effective bombing raids, lasting over two hours. He 111Hs began with level bombardment, followed by low-altitude strafing by Ju 88s. He 177As provided before-and-after reconnaissance. According to the internal history: "43 Fortresses were destroyed or damaged beyond repair; 3 C-47s and 1 F-5 were likewise destroyed. 26 Fortresses, 2 C-47s and 1 C-46, and 25 Russian aircraft (mainly Yak fighters) were heavily damaged but repairable; over 450,000 gallons of gasoline were destroyed and over 500 gallons of aircraft oil; over 3200 bombs, 26,000 bomb fuses, and 1,360,000 cartridges were destroyed."

25 Russians were killed on the night of the raid, but anti-personnel bomblets continued to go off for weeks after the attack, causing continuing casualties.

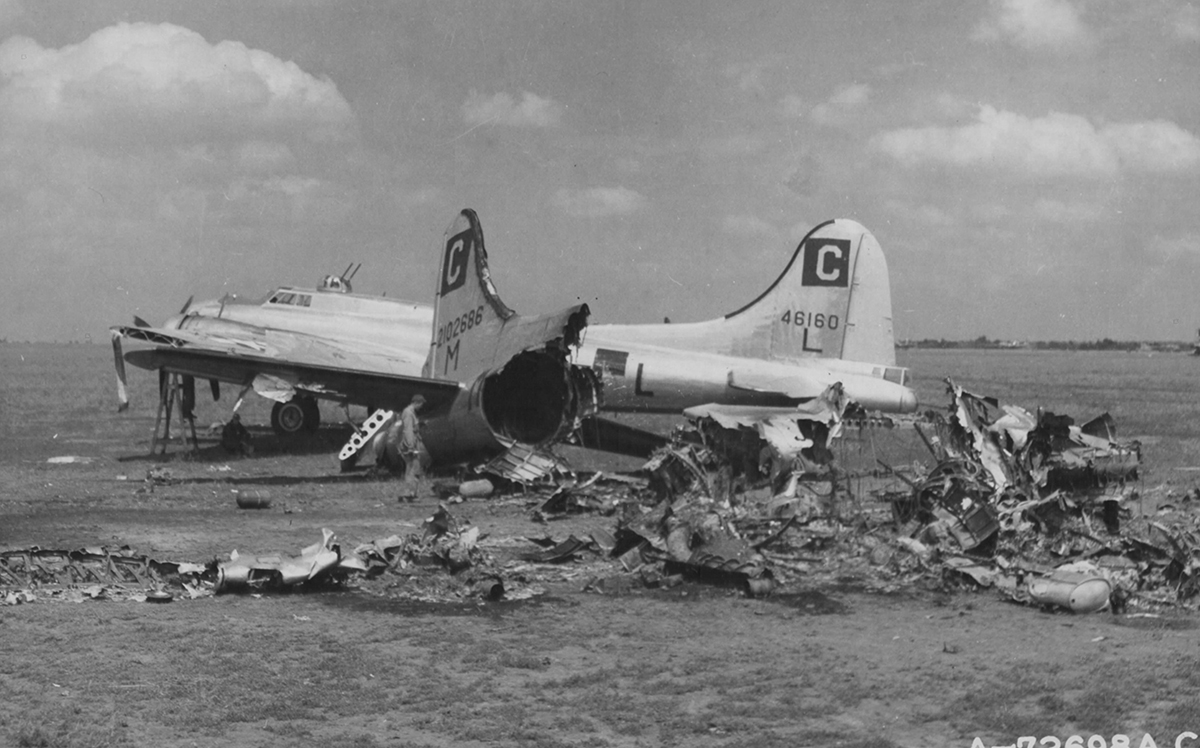
Damaged US Boeing B-17s on Poltava Airfield June 1944

Flyable aircraft from all three bases were evacuated next morning to Soviet air bases farther east. The other two bases were attacked the next nights. Surviving bombers consolidated into one group and flew home several days later.

The disaster infuriated many Americans because Soviet air defenses were completely ineffective. The head of the Military Mission in Moscow, General John Deane reported back: "The Russian anti-aircraft and fighter defenses failed miserably. Their anti-aircraft batteries fired 28,000 rounds of medium and heavy shells, assisted by searchlights, without bringing down a single German plane. There were supposed to be 40 Yaks on hand as night fighters, but only four or five of them got off the ground. Both their anti-aircraft and night fighters lacked the radar devices which made ours so effective." (If nothing else, the statements by a ranking American that "the Russian...anti-aircraft batteries fired 28,000 rounds of medium and heavy shells..." and that "...only four or five (Yaks) got off the ground" completely refutes other claims that the Russians provided nothing more than a single truck carrying .50 caliber machine guns as air defense.) American fighters were not permitted to take off (U.S. air operations were governed by a cumbersome 24-hour-long permitting process), but without radar they would have been equally ineffective.

Afterwards the USAAF discontinued heavy bomber operations at Poltava for about a month. FRANTIC-3 and 4 consisted of long-range fighters. The Americans also insisted on stationing radar-equipped night fighters, P-61s of the 427th Night Fighter Squadron, at Poltava, but Soviet permission could not be obtained.

When further issues arose over resupply of the Warsaw Uprising (also denied), and a hostile environment at the bases replaced previous amity, the USAAF decided to downgrade the base, and major operations ended by late September.

A few Americans (particularly Infield) have later asserted that Joseph Stalin had been complicit in the German attack, and that the USSR did not want the Americans to "settle in" in Ukraine. More temperate analyses suggest that Stalin wanted to learn from American strategic air power, and when he had obtained what he wanted, cooperation turned to hostility. At any rate, the winter of 1945 at Poltava was characterized by poor morale, orchestrated violence against servicemen, theft of American stores, and non-cooperation with American requests. Before evacuation, the U.S. commander dumped equipment in the river instead of turning it over.

However, most sources agree that the Americans initially received excellent cooperation from the VVS and from the local population, and that obstructions were the work of the Soviet political structure. Ukrainian local women worked extremely hard on completing the base, and initially associated freely with American servicemen. A local black market and barter trade developed. During and after the German raid, locals were sent to fight fires and disable bombs with resulting high casualties.

The American experience at Poltava informed a generation of USAF officers about the Soviet Union, in many ways precipitating the Cold War well before the political leadership gave up on trying to work with the Soviets. However, analysts agree that as a bombing tactic against the Axis, the Frantic raids were of limited effectiveness and entirely disproportionate to the enormous effort invested in the program.

=== Cold War ===
After the war the airfield was rebuilt and was used as a Soviet Air Defence Forces base. Dispersal hardstands were built attached to each end of the single runway, expanded for jet aircraft use, some being hardened with Tab-Vee concrete shelters. It was known as Air Base A2673

From 1945, the airfield was used by the 13th Guards Dnepropetrovsko-Budapeshtskaya order of Suvorov Heavy Bomber Aviation Division (ru:13-я гвардейская бомбардировочная авиационная дивизия) of Soviet Long Range Aviation. The division traced its history back to the 52nd Aviation Division formed on 5 November 1940. From 1945 to the 13th Division came under the command of the 2nd Heavy Bomber Aviation Corps. On 10 January 1949 a decree was issued renaming the 2nd Corps the 70th Guards Bomber Aviation Corps (which became "Heavy Bomber" the next year). The first Tupolev Tu-4s, copies of the Boeing B-29 Superfortress, arrived that year. Since 1956, all the regiments of the 13th Guards Heavy Bomber Aviation Division were retrained on Tupolev Tu-16 (ASCC "Badger") heavy jet bombers, with the ability to deliver nuclear weapons. In August 1956, the 70th Guards Heavy Bomber Bryansk Aviation Corps was disbanded and the division became directly subordinate to the 43rd Air Army DA of Long Range Aviation.

Subsequently, the division was successively included in the 2nd Separate Heavy Bomber Aviation Corps, formed on the basis of formations of the disbanded 43rd Air Army of Long-Range Aviation, and from 1 August 1980 - in the 46th Air Army.

After the collapse of the USSR from late 1991, on 1 January 1992, the division became part of the Ukrainian Air Force. The Ukrainian Air Force eventually deployed the Tu-22M3 with the 185th Guards Heavy Bomber Aviation Regiment (GvTBAP), before this unit was finally disbanded in 2006.

The base was used by the:

- 224th Guards Bomber Aviation Regiment between 1945 and 1947

=== Post-Cold War ===
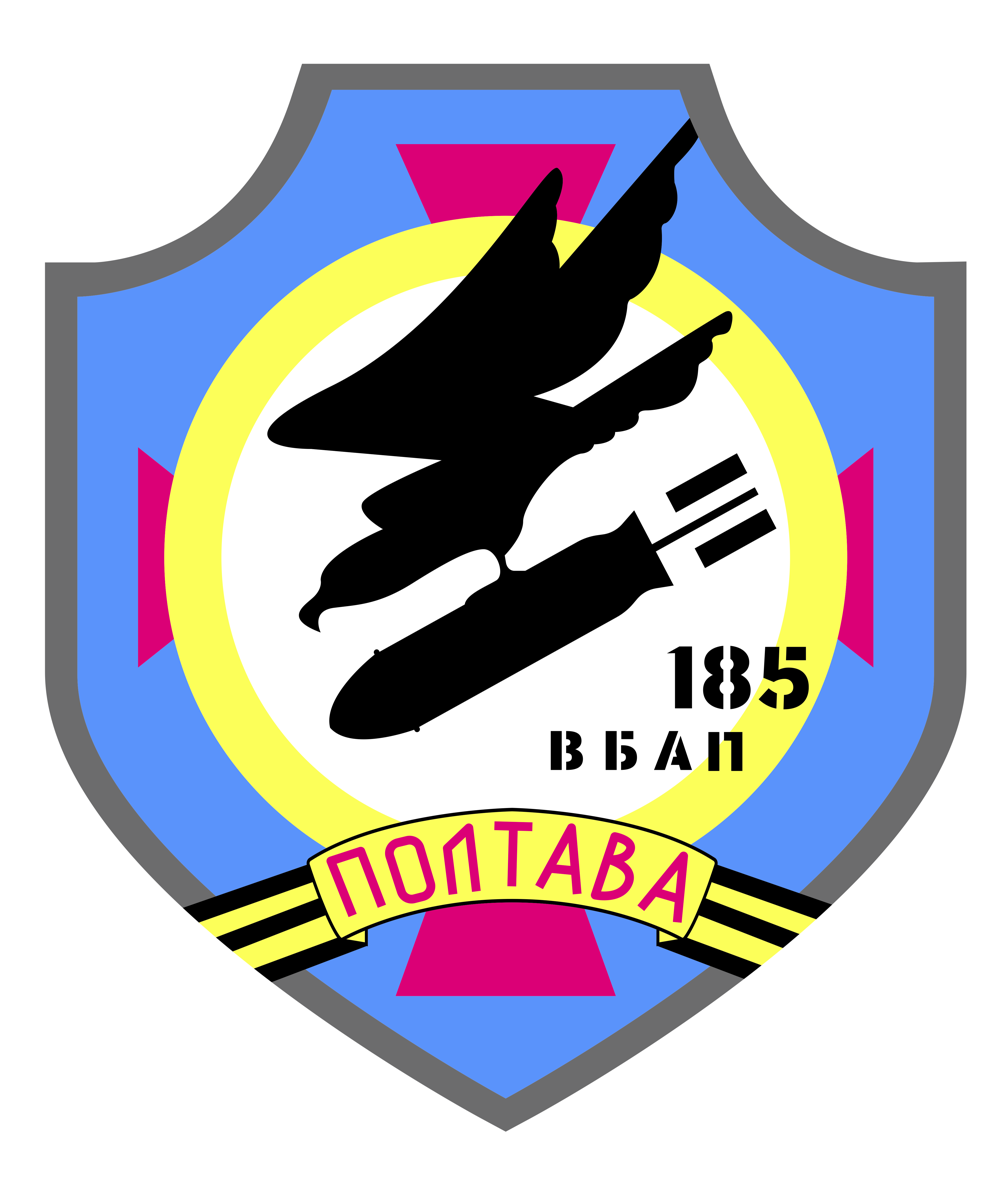
185th GvTBAP

From 1991 to 1992 the Soviet Air Force was superseded in Ukraine by the Ukrainian Air Force, which eventually deployed the Tu-22M3 with the 185th GvTBAP, before this unit was finally disbanded in 2006.

In February 2015 the 18th Army Aviation Brigade of the Ukrainian Ground Forces was formed here. The main equipment: Mi-2MSB, Mi-8MSB and Mi-24P.

== Poltava Museum of Long-Range Aviation ==
Several Soviet military aircraft are on static display at the end of a large dispersal runway 49°37′04″N 034°30′09″E. On display are: Antonov AN-26 (61 Blue) transport; Tupolev Tu-95 bomber; Tupolev Tu-22M3 (80 Blue) bomber; Tupolev Tu-22KD bomber (63 Red); Tupolev Tu-16 (25 Blue) bomber; Mikoyan-Gurevich MiG-21 fighter; Sukhoi Su-24 attack aircraft.

Also, a Tupolev Tu-160 (20 Red), supersonic, variable-sweep wing heavy strategic bomber inherited from the former Soviet Union is on display. It is the only known example of this aircraft on public display.
