= Galați Airport =

Defunct airport in Galați, Romania

- IATA: none; ICAO: none

Summary
- Airport type: Defunct
- Serves: Galați
- Location: Romania
- Opened: 24 June 1926; 100 years ago
- Closed: 1958
- Coordinates: 45°27′20″N 28°01′40″E

Map
- Location in Romania

Galați Airport (Romanian: Aeroportul Galați) was an airport located in Galați, Romania. It operated from 1926 to 1958.

== History ==
The operations of the Galați Airport started on 24 June 1926. At the time, Galați had high relevance for the Kingdom of Romania, both because of its port on the Danube and for being regarded as an important crossroad between Muntenia, where the Romanian capital Bucharest was located, and Bessarabia, which belonged to Romania at the time. Before World War II, the airport served joint civil and military operations.

During World War II, Nazi Germany's air force, the Luftwaffe, began upgrading Galați Airport in 1941. From the fall of 1941 until spring to summer of 1944, the airport was used as an aircraft repair and overhaul facility and a fighter training base. On 6 June 1944, during the Allies' Operation Frantic, the Galați Airport was heavily bombed. 98% of its buildings, facilities and vehicles were destroyed, thirteen soldiers were killed and the airport was left non-operational. After the war, it continued to be used until 1958 when the Galați Airport was abolished on the premise of being ineffective and inducing a loss of money.

In recent years, there have been efforts between the Brăila and Galați counties to achieve the construction of a new airport in the area serving the proposed Lower Danube metropolitan area, which includes both Brăila and Galați.

== See also ==
- List of airports in Romania
