= Pyriatyn Airport =

- IATA: none; ICAO: none

Summary
- Airport type: Undetermined
- Location: Pyriatyn, Ukraine
- Coordinates: 50°09′08″N 032°31′47″E

Map

Runways
Direction	Length		Surface
Direction	m	ft	Surface
10/28	2,500	8,250	Asphalt

Pyriatyn Airport was an airfield located approximately 12 km (7.5 mi) south of Pyriatyn, Ukraine. Satellite imagery appears to show that it has been abandoned.

== History ==
In May 1944, the recently improved field was provided to the United States Army Air Forces for use by American aircraft operating in support of the shuttle bombing program. Unlike the other two such bases (Myrhorod and Poltava), Piryatin was designated for use by fighter aircraft due to the limitations of the field. It was used by the Eighth and Fifteenth Air Forces for shuttle bombing missions (Operation Frantic) from June 1944 through September 1944.

Piryatin was designated as USAAF Station 560 for security purposes and was thus referred to in all messages and written correspondence. Piriatyn was one of three Ukraine installations operated by Headquarters, Eastern Command, United States Strategic Air Forces

Aircraft, predominantly P-51s and P-38s, would fly into the field from either Great Britain or Southern Italy after attacking enemy targets in Eastern Europe. The aircraft would refuel and rearm at the airport, then attack enemy targets on return missions to Southern Italy.

On the night of 23 June 1944, Piryatin was the target of a German air attack, but unlike the case at the other two bases, the German bombers failed to locate the field and dropped their bombs in the vicinity.

Major operations ended in September 1944, and the Americans consolidated their presence at Poltava for the remainder of the war.
