= John R. Deane =

United States Army general

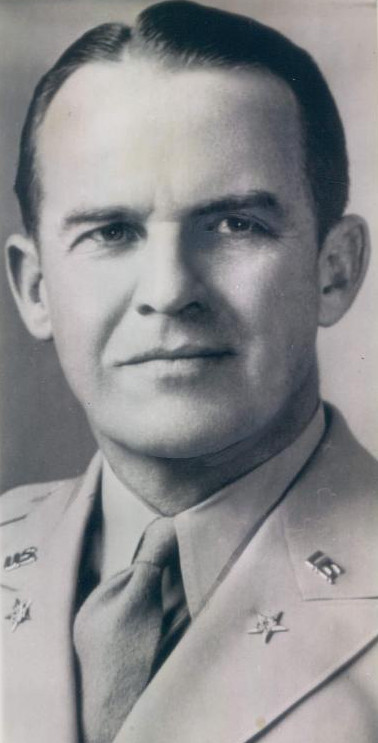
- Born: March 18, 1896; San Francisco, California, United States
- Died: July 14, 1982 (aged 86); Charleston, South Carolina, United States
- Relatives: John R. Deane Jr. (son)
- Military career
- Allegiance: United States
- Branch: United States
- Service years: 1917–1946
- Rank: Major General
- Service number: O-9759
- Conflicts: World War I World War II
- Awards: Army Distinguished Service Medal; Legion of Merit

Major General John Russell Deane (March 18, 1896 – July 14, 1982) was a senior United States Army officer who served as Chief of the United States Military Mission in the U.S. Embassy in Moscow during World War II. As such, he was the principal U.S. military official in Moscow through the end of the war and Ambassador W. Averell Harriman's key military advisor. He attended the 1943 Moscow Conference and the 1945 Yalta Conference. As the war progressed, he became frustrated by the Soviet government and urged that the U.S. work with the Soviets under a firmer policy "based on mutual respect and made to work both ways."

Shortly after being named to head the military mission, Deane joined a U.S. delegation headed by Secretary of State Cordell Hull to the Moscow Conference, October 19–30, 1943. Harriman, the new U.S. ambassador to the Soviet Union, also joined the delegation. Because Hull believed there was a pressing need to reassure Josef Stalin of plans for OVERLORD, the invasion of France aimed for spring 1944, he had Deane brief the Soviets on the plans along with British General Sir Hastings Ismay of the British Chiefs of Staff Committee (COS). Secretary Hull and Deane were pleased by the Soviets' response to the briefing and their expressed willingness to accept "virtually all the secretary's major points on wartime and postwar cooperation." Yet Deane would sour on the lack of Soviet cooperation in coming months.

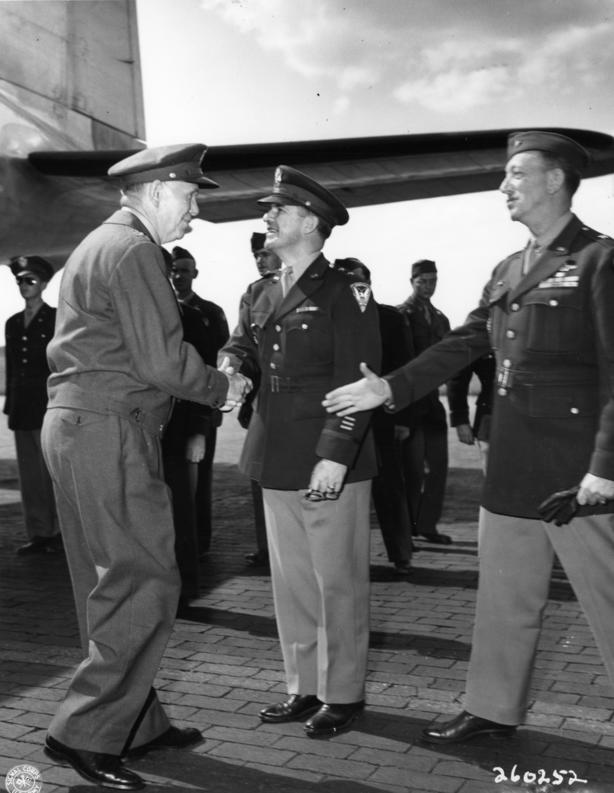
General George C. Marshall (left) shakes hands with Major General John R. Deane, center, as Brigadier General Stuart Cutler extends his hand in greeting. He is arriving for the Potsdam Conference, 1945.

In December 1944, Deane wrote to U.S. Army Chief of Staff Gen. George C. Marshall: "We should stop pushing ourselves on them [the Soviet authorities] and make the Soviet authorities come to us. We should be friendly and co-operative when they do so." Gar Alperovitz wrote, "This would increase America's economic leverage," but Robert James Maddox wrote, "This hardly amounts to a recipe for coercion." Some weeks after his December missive, Deane repeated his "warnings and recommendations in a fifty-four page memorandum to the Joint Chiefs of Staff." It included "thirty-four case histories of Soviet noncooperation." Gen. Marshall, who completely endorsed the memo, passed it to Secretary of War Henry L. Stimson. He in turn shared it with President Franklin D. Roosevelt and discussed it with him personally.

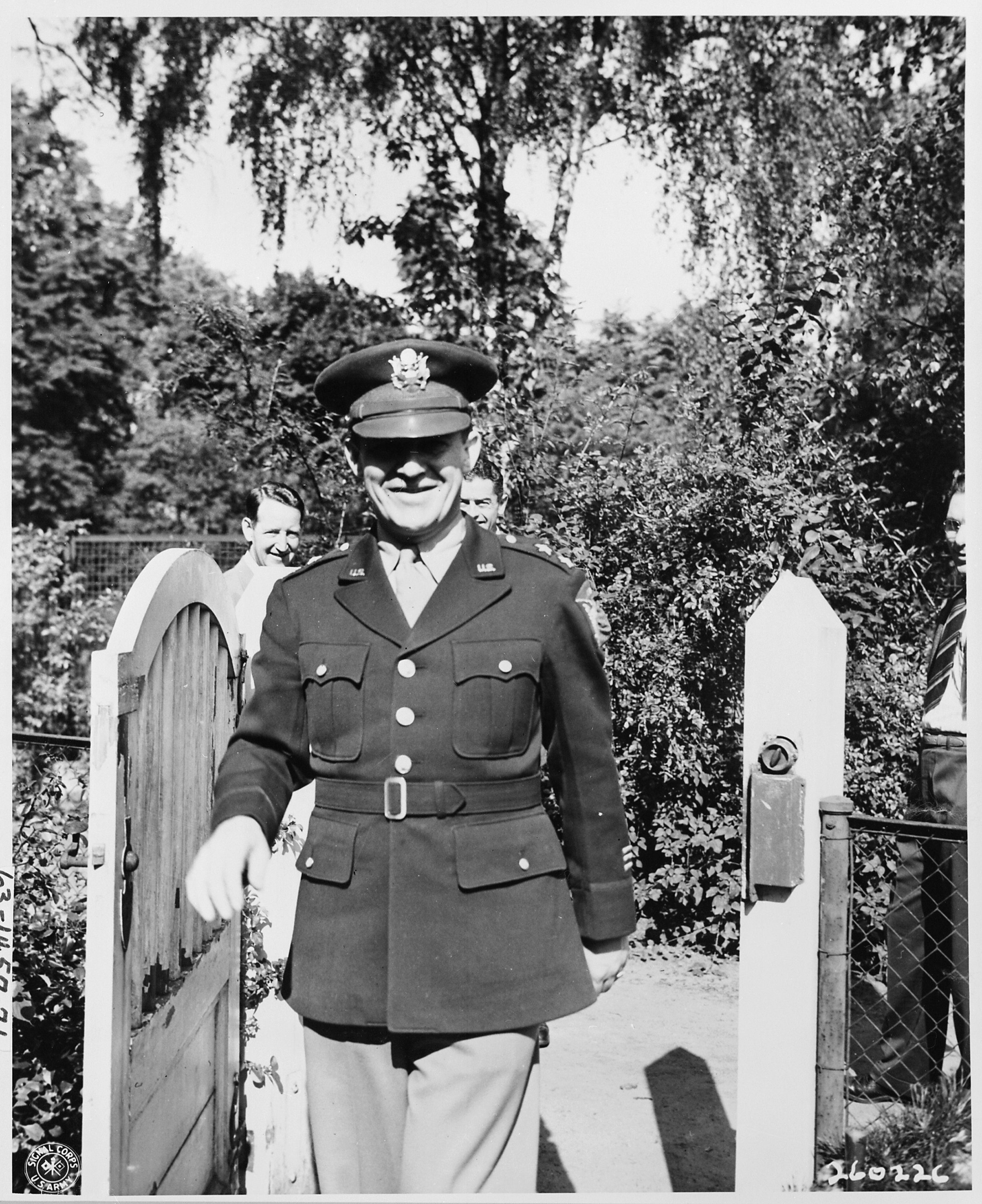
Major General John R. Deane, Commanding General, Military Mission to Moscow, arrives at the residence of U.S. Ambassador W. Averell Harriman during the Potsdam Conference in Potsdam, Germany, 1945.

At the Yalta Conference, February 4–11, 1945, he and Ambassador Harriman clashed with Soviet officials over the issue of the return of American and British soldiers who had been held in a German administrated POW camps liberated by the Red Army. "There had been endless difficulties in this regard" as the Soviets did not want any western representatives in Poland while they put down opposition there. The "resulting clashes" over this issue greatly influenced Harriman and Deane "in their negative attitudes toward the Soviet Union and thus to the development of the Cold War." In a visit to Washington in April 1945, Deane further pressed the Joints Chiefs of Staff for more focused and restrictive cooperation with Russia.

According to diplomat George F. Kennan, Harriman's deputy chief of mission, the ambassador found in Deane "a senior military aide of the highest quality: modest, unassuming, scrupulously honest, fair-minded and clear-sighted."

Deane authored The Strange Alliance - The Story of Our Efforts at Wartime Cooperation with Russia (The Viking Press, 1947).

Through the efforts of William J. Donovan and industrialist Seton Porter, Deane relocated to his home state of California to become president of wine maker Italian Swiss Colony. Deane served as president from 1946 to 1952.
