= Aviation in Romania =

Romania has a rich tradition in aviation. At the beginning of the 20th century, pioneers such as Henri Coandă, Aurel Vlaicu, Traian Vuia and George Valentin Bibescu made important contributions to early aviation history, building revolutionary airplanes and contributing to the international scene.

In the present, the Romanian Civil Aeronautical Authority oversees all the aviation activities.

== History ==
=== Pioneers ===
George Valentin Bibescu was a Romanian aristocrat who became an early aviation pioneer and international figure. He flew a balloon named "Romania" brought from France in 1905. Later, he tried to teach himself how to fly a Voisin airplane, also brought from France, but without success. After Louis Blériot's demonstrative flights in Bucharest on October 18, 1909, Bibescu went to Paris and enrolled in Blériot's flying school where, in 1910, he obtained International Pilot License number 20. After returning from France, Bibescu organized the Cotroceni Piloting School in Bucharest where Mircea Zorileanu and Nicolae Capșa were licensed. On May 5, 1912, he founded the Romanian National Aeronautic League. Bibescu would later be instrumental in founding the Fédération Aéronautique Internationale (FAI), the international regulatory body for aeronautics. Between 1927 and 1930, he was its vice-president, becoming president in 1930 and remaining so until 1941.

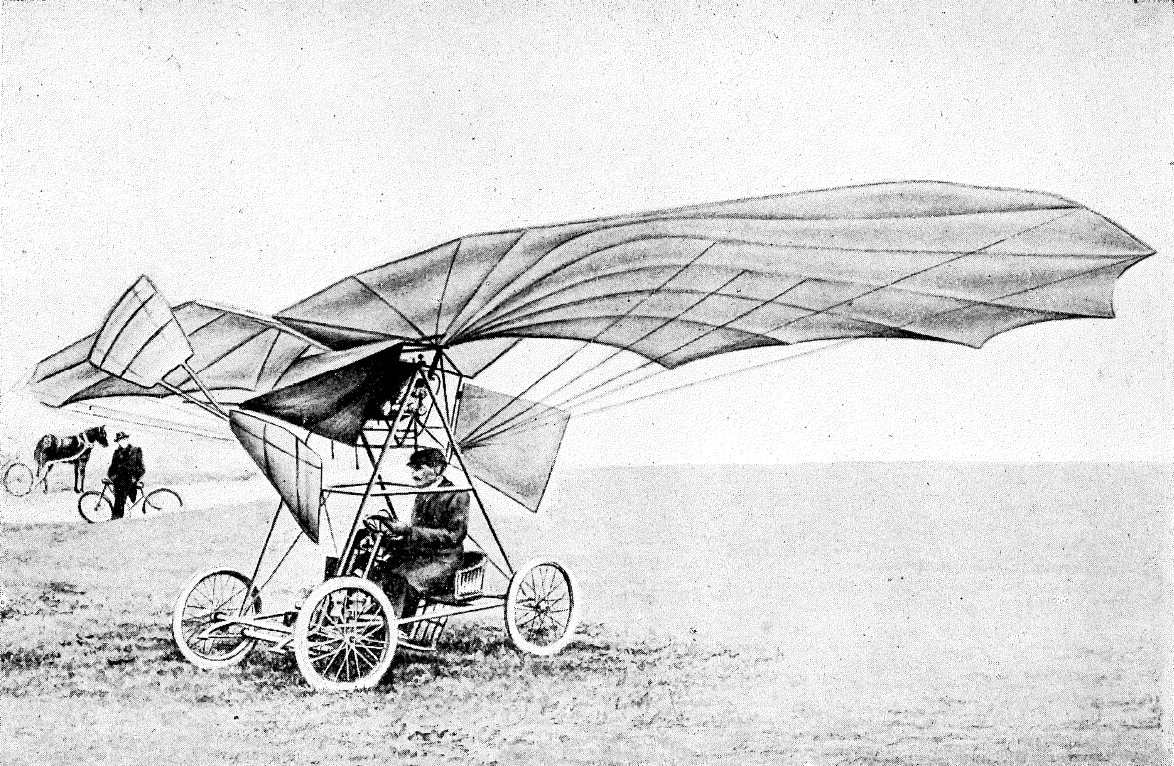
Vuia 1

Traian Vuia was a Romanian inventor and aviation pioneer. He constructed his first powered, fixed wing aircraft with wheeled undercarriage, and in 1906 he flew short hops in it at Montesson near Paris, France. On March 18, he flew about 12 metres at a height of 1 foot, and on 19 August he flew for 24 metres. Although unsuccessful at true flight, Vuia's aircraft has been credited as "the first man-carrying monoplane of basically modern configuration" and influenced the more successful Brazilian pioneer Alberto Santos-Dumont. Vuia went on to experiment with another monoplane and two helicopters but none was successful.

Aurel Vlaicu was born in Transylvania, then part of Austria-Hungary. Having constructed a glider with his brother, he moved to the Kingdom of Romania in 1909. His first aircraft, the A Vlaicu I, was constructed at the Army Arsenal in Bucharest and was first flown on 17 June 1910, a day still celebrated in Romania as National Aviation Day. Vlaicu later constructed two more aircraft, fatally crashing the second in 1913 while trying to cross the Carpathians before the third had flown. His dream of crossing the Carpathians in flight was fulfilled by Lieutenant Ioan Peneș on 1 September 1916.

Henri Coandă exhibited the Coandă-1910 at the Second International Aeronautical Exhibition in Paris around October 1910, and built his first flying aircraft in 1911. Later, he worked in the UK to design aircraft, a number of Bristol T.B.8 and Bristol Coanda Monoplanes being purchased by the Romanian Army and Government. Coandă continued to research in a variety of fields. He is most famous for discovering the Coandă effect in aerodynamics and fluidics.

=== Early military aviation ===
The Romanian Army took an interest in aviation from the earliest days, facilitating the construction of the Vlaicu I in 1910. The next year, the Army formed the Aviation Group, which over the next few years became equipped with locally manufactured Farman biplanes under license and also acquired two Blériot monoplanes, several Bristol-Coandă monoplanes and two Morane Type F monoplanes. On 1 April 1913, it became the Military Aeronautics Service (Serviciul de Aeronautică Militară); the Corps of Permanent Airmen (Corpul Aeronauților Permanți) was also established on this date. Three months later, they engaged in reconnaissance sorties over the Bulgarian border at the start of the Second Balkan War. During the same war, the Romanian airmen also flew reconnaissance and leaflet drop missions over the Bulgarian capital, the Romanian Aeronautics Service thus becoming the first air arm to fly over an enemy capital city.

The Romanian Air Corps was established on 15 September 1915, at a time during the First World War when Romania was still neutral. That same year, even before Romania joined the Western Powers in 1916, it was supplied with 44 aircraft by France. During the ensuing defeat of Romanian forces, the Air Corps was chronically short of serviceable aircraft and supplies and was reorganised several times.

After World War I, the Air Corps again saw action in the 1919 campaign to secure Transylvania from Hungary. By then, the Air Corps was in a sorry state; but following the collapse of the Hungarian communist regime the Air Corps gained 150 captured aircraft. From then on, the air arm grew steadily, being reorganized in 1924 into the Aeronautica Regală Română (ARR, lit. 'Romanian Royal Aeronautics'). Further aircraft were acquired from France, and licensed production was set up at various centres. By the early 1930s, Romanian aviation began producing more native designs and types such as the SET 10, SET XV, IAR 14 and IAR 15 fighters. However these were not yet judged adequate, and for a period front line fighter squadrons were equipped with Polish PZL fighters, examples of which were both purchased and manufactured. In the late 1930s, the ARR also significantly developed its bombing capabilities and the IAR 37 light reconnaissance bomber went into production.

As World War II loomed in 1939, Romania found itself in a precarious position and made many treaties with its neighbours. One result of this was a change of supplier; a number of German aircraft were procured and IAR licensed production of the Junkers Jumo 211Da aero engine. In response, Britain began supplying frontline aircraft, although only a few Hawker Hurricanes and Bristol Blenheims arrived in the few days left before hostilities would begin.

=== World War II ===
Following the outbreak of war and the German invasion of Poland, over 100 surviving aircraft of the Polish Air Force joined the ARR. However the increasing aggressiveness of the Axis powers forced Romania to join them. Through 1940 and 1941, the German presence and influence grew strongly.

In June 1941, with the ARR operational strength at 621 aircraft, Romania joined Germany in the attack on the Soviet Union and the ARR was committed heavily in support. In February 1941, deliveries of the IAR 80 fighter began, and both this type and its dive bomber derivative, the IAR 81, joined front line operations. Following a long and bloody campaign, by the summer of 1943 emphasis was beginning to switch to the air defence of Romania and especially the oil wells and refineries which supplied Germany, the ARR giving a good account of itself during the American Operation Tidal Wave bombing raids. By now the ARR was operating a great mix of aircraft types, including more than 80 types of trainer.

On 20 August 1944, the Soviets launched a major offensive into Romania. Following a coup led by King Michael of Romania, Romania changed sides and turned against its former German allies. Although by now possessing less than 200 operational combat aircraft organised in the 1st Air Corps, the ARR joined in the attack on German forces. Despite chaotic conditions, exacerbated by the Soviet demand for Romanian mechanics to maintain their aircraft, IAR continued a low level of production and the ARR began to rebuild its strength. Continued operations over Slovakia and against German and Hungarian forces reduced its strength once again, having just 10 operational combat squadrons remaining by the end of the War.

=== Postwar ===
In 1947, Romania became a republic and its air arm changed its name to the Forțele Aeriene ale Republicii Populare România, the Air Forces of the Romanian People's Republic or FR-RPR. From 1948, greater cooperation with Soviet forces began with the introduction of the Yakovlev Yak-11 trainer, and the ageing combat fleet was progressively supplemented and replaced by more modern Soviet types.

The first jet fighter arrived in the 1950s, in the form of the Yakovlev Yak-23. A process of expansion and modernization continued, and accelerated after Romania joined the Warsaw Pact in 1955. The supersonic age arrived during this period, with the introduction of the Mikoyan-Gurevich MiG-19. The expansion slowed after the withdrawal of the last Soviet forces in 1958, and the FR-RPR ended its participation in Warsaw Pact exercises in 1962 (see De-satellization of the Socialist Republic of Romania). 1962 saw the introduction of the Soviet Mikoyan-Gurevich MiG-21 fighter, while in 1965 the Czech Aero L-29 Delfin jet trainer also entered service.

1966 saw yet another name change accompanying Romania's establishment of a Socialist Republic, to the Forțele Aeriene ale Republicii Socialiste România – the Air Forces of the Romanian Socialist Republic or FR-RSR. The new FR-RSR went on to maintain and modernize its fleet, including the introduction of a variety of Mil helicopters, some of them Polish-built.

In the 1970s, Romania began once more to develop its own military aircraft including a joint Yugoslav-Romanian attack aircraft built in Romania as the IAR-93 Vultur, and the IAR-99 Șoim trainer – the first jet of wholly Romanian design. Helicopters such as the IAR 316 and IAR 330 were built under license from Aérospatiale, and the ROMBAC 1-11 passenger aircraft was built under license from BAC.

=== Astronautics ===
Dumitru Prunariu is the only Romanian astronaut who participated in a space mission (Soyuz 40 – May 14, 1981).

== Romanian air transport operators ==
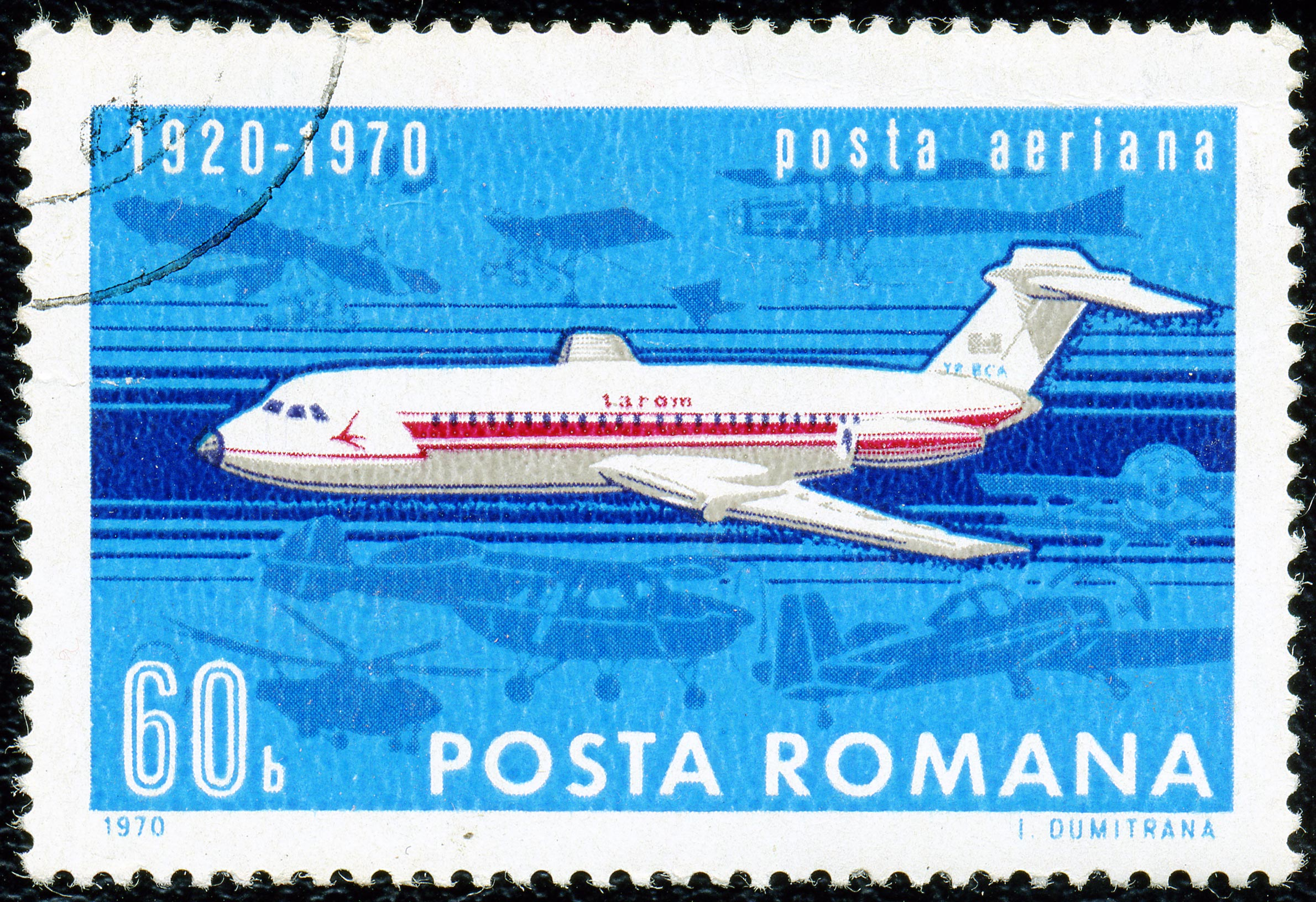
1970 stamp

=== Flag carrier ===
Name	Hubs	Notes
TAROM	Henri Coandă International Airport	The state-owned Romanian operator

=== Active Romanian carriers ===
Name	Hubs	Notes
AeroItalia Regional	Henri Coandă International Airport	Former AeroConnect
Animawings	Henri Coandă International Airport	
Carpatair	Traian Vuia International Airport	
Dan Air	George Enescu International Airport	Former Just Us Air
Fly Lili	Aurel Vlaicu International Airport	
HelloJets	Aurel Vlaicu International Airport	
HiSky Europe	Henri Coandă International Airport	Founded in Moldova as HiSky, launched its operations in Romania as HiSky Europe
Legend Airlines	Henri Coandă International Airport	
Regional Air Services	Tuzla Aerodrome	Air taxi carrier
ROMCargo Airlines		Air cargo carrier
Star East Airline	Aurel Vlaicu International Airport	
Țiriac Air	Henri Coandă International Airport	Corporate jet carrier
Toyo Aviation	Aurel Vlaicu International Airport	Corporate jet carrier

=== Former Romanian carriers ===
- Acvila Air
- Alfa Air Services
- Air Bucharest
- Angel Airlines
- Bees Airlines – Trademark was bought from the Ukrainian Bees Airline
- Blue Air
- Dac Air
- Jaro International
- Jetran Air
- LAR Romanian Airlines
- Romavia

== Airports in Romania ==
Romania has a well-developed airport infrastructure compared to other countries in Eastern Europe, but still underdeveloped compared to Western countries standards. There are 16 commercial airports in service today, most of them opened for international traffic. Four of the airports (OTP, BBU, TSR, CND) have runways of 3,100–3,500 metres (10,171–11,483 ft) in length and are capable of handling jumbo jets. Six of the airports (BCM, CRA, IAS, SBZ, SCV, SUJ) have runways of 2,400–2,700 metres (7,874–8,858 ft) in length, while the rest of them have runways of 2,000–2,200 metres (6,562–7,218 ft) in length.

In 2011, air traffic reached 10.7 million passengers, 5.1% more than the previous year when there were 10.2 million people flying by plane.

== Manufacturing ==
The industrial facilities for aircraft building and maintenance are located in Bacău (Aerostar), Brașov (Industria Aeronautică Română), Craiova (Avioane Craiova) and Bucharest (Romaero, Turbomecanica).

== Future development ==
Following the ascending curve of the economy growth, the air transportation in Romania experiences a favorable trend. Carpatair is the Romanian airline with the most spectacular growth; the national carrier TAROM is recovering from a difficult period at the beginning of the 2000s, 2004 being the first profitable year in the last 10 years, but with a price: the cancellation of the long-haul flights to New York, Chicago, Montreal and Beijing. In 2006 the company started a fleet update program with the acquisition of 4 new Airbus A318 airplanes, 2 new ATR 72 turboprops in 2009 and two new Boeing 737-800 NG in 2017. The first Romanian low-cost airline, Blue Air, is going through a development phase, while other low-cost airlines are ready to start their operations.

There are many investment projects also in airport infrastructure: the upgrading of the existing airports (major rehabilitation programs for OTP, TSR, CLJ, CND, the airports with the most significant traffic growth) and the construction of three new airports in Brașov, Galați – Brăila (a 600,000 inhabitants urban area without airport access) and Deva – Alba Iulia (Southern Transylvania).

Currently (dec. 2006) the most advanced project is the construction of the new Brașov Airport, the construction site opening was planned for March 2007 but construction was halted. Construction restarted in April 2013. The project consists of a 1 mil. passengers/year terminal and a runway of 2,800 m long.

== Cultural significance ==
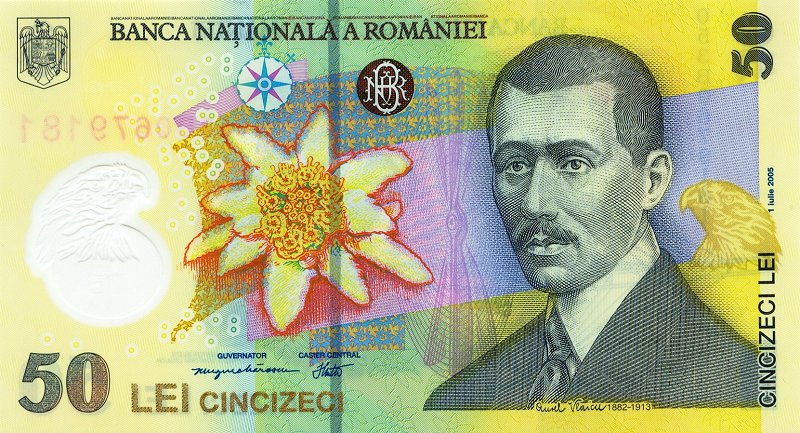
Aurel Vlaicu on the 50 Romanian lei bill

National Aviation Day is celebrated on 17 June, the anniversary of Aurel Vlaicu's first flight.

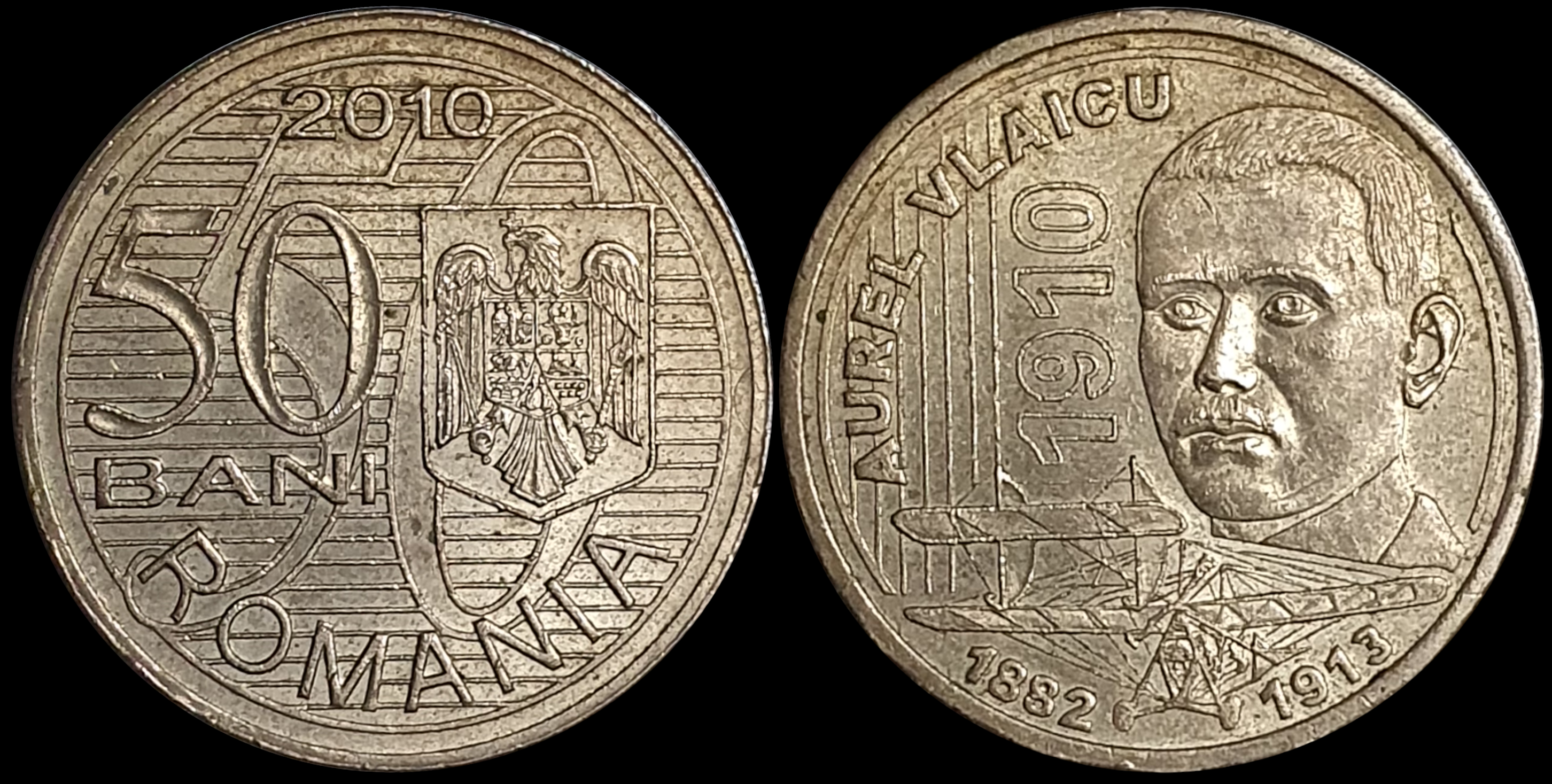
Commemorative 50 bani coin of Vlaicu's flight, 2010

Early pioneer aircraft have appeared on postage stamps, and Vlaicu on a bank note.

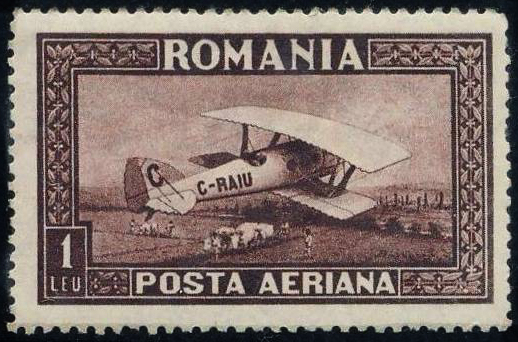
1928 stamp

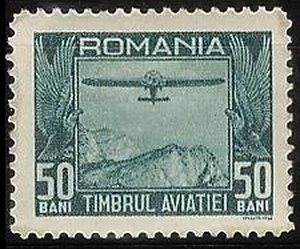
1931 stamp

== See also ==
- Transport in Romania
- Romanian Space Agency
- Science and technology in Romania
- Romanian air tours over Africa
