= List of defunct airlines of Romania =

This is a list of defunct airlines of Romania.

Airline	Image	IATA	ICAO	Callsign	Commenced operations	Ceased operations	Notes
Acvila Air		WZ	RRM		1994	2006	Rebranded as Jetran Air
Aeroline International					1998	1999	
Air Antares		TF	AAY		1991	1997	Charter airline
Air Romania (AiRom 2000)			RMM		1999	2000	Charter airline
Alfa Air			ALR	ALFA GROUP	2008	2012	Private jets
Angel Airlines		8K	KOZ	ANGEL WINGS	2001	2004	Mainline
Aviation Transport Services			ROS		1991	2001	Charter airline
Banat Air Service		BZ	BAT		1995	1997	Charter airline
Blue Air		0B	BLA		2004	2023	Low-cost airline
CFRNA					1920	1925	Rebranded as CIDNA, flag carrier
Chris Air					2005	2005	Low-cost airline
CIDNA					1925	1928	Rebranded as SNNA, flag carrier
DAC Air		6P	GCP		1995	1998	
Direct Aero Services			DSV		2007	2012	Charter airline
Eurojet Romania			RDP	JET-ARROW	2004	2015	Private jets
Fly Romania		X5	OTJ	FLY ROMANIA	2014	2014	Low-cost airline
Grivco Air			GIV		1993	2001	Private jets
Jaro International		JT	MDJ		1991	2001	Charter airline
JeTran Air		WZ	MDJ	JETRAN AIR	2005	2011	Rebranded as Tend Air, charter airline
Inter Aviation					2011	2013	Private jets
LAR Romanian Airlines		QR	RLA		1975	1997	Charter airline
LARES		RO			1930	1946	Merged into TARS, flag carrier
Medallion Air			MDP	MEDALS	2009	2013	Merged with Tend Air to create Ten Airways, charter airline
MIA Airlines			JLA	SALLINE	2005	2011	Private jets
Miravia		N3	MRV		1995	2000	Charter airline
Romavia		WQ	RMV	AEROMAVIA	1991	2014	Went bankrupt, governmental airline
SARTA					1935	1937	Merged into LARES, regional airline
SNNA					1928	1930	Rebranded as LARES, flag carrier
TARS					1945	1954	Rebranded as TAROM, mainline
Tend Air		WZ	MDJ	Tender Air	2011	2013	Merged with Medallion Air to create Ten Airways, charter airline
Ten Airways		X5	OTJ		2009	2015	Charter airline
Valahia Air			VLH		2013	2014	
Veg Air		V3	VEG	Vegair	1998	2000	Renamed/merged to Carpatair

== See also ==
- List of airlines of Romania
- List of airports in Romania
