= List of airlines of Romania =

This is a list of airlines which have an Air Operator Certificate issued by the Civil Aviation Authority of Romania.

== Scheduled airlines ==
Airline	Image	IATA	ICAO	Callsign	Hub airport(s)	Commenced operations	Notes
Animawings		A2	AWG	ANIMA WINGS	Henri Coandă International Airport, Timișoara Traian Vuia International Airport	2019	scheduled airline
Dan Air		DN	DNA	DAN AIR	George Enescu International Airport, Henri Coandă International Airport	2018	scheduled airline
FlyOne Romania		OE	FOE	FIRST EAGLE	Henri Coandă International Airport	2022	low-cost airline
HiSky Europe		H4	HYS	SKY EUROPE	Henri Coandă International Airport, Cluj International Airport, Timișoara Traian Vuia International Airport	2021	low-cost airline
TAROM		RO	ROT	TAROM	Henri Coandă International Airport	1954	flag carrier, scheduled airline

== Charter airlines ==
Airline	Image	IATA	ICAO	Callsign	Hub airport(s)	Commenced operations	Notes
Carpatair		V3	KRP	CARPATAIR	Chișinău International Airport, Timișoara Traian Vuia International Airport	1999	charter airline
C&I Corporation						2008	private jets
Fly Lili		FL	LIL	LILIES	Bucharest Băneasa Aurel Vlaicu International Airport	2022	charter airline
FLYYO		4D	DIR	DIREKT WINGS	Henri Coandă International Airport	2021	charter airline
Legend Airlines		LZ	LAL	LEGEND AIR		2024	charter airline
Regional Air Services			RTZ	AEROTUZLA	Tuzla Aerodrome	1998	general aviation, business jets
Star East Airline			SEK	EAST RIDER	Aurel Vlaicu International Airport	2017	charter airline
Toyo Aviation			TOY	TOYO AVIATION		2009	private jets
Țiriac Air			TIH	TIRIAC AIR	Henri Coandă International Airport	1997	private jets

== Cargo airlines ==
Airline	Image	IATA	ICAO	Callsign	Hub airport(s)	Commenced operations	Notes
ROMCargo Airlines		NJ	RCR	ROMCARGO	Henri Coandă International Airport	2020	cargo airline

== See also ==
- List of defunct airlines of Romania
- List of airlines
- List of companies of Romania
