= Cluj (disambiguation) =

Cluj may refer to

- Cluj-Napoca, county seat of Cluj County, named Cluj until 1974
- Cluj County, Romania
- Cluj-Napoca International Airport
- U Cluj, a Romanian sports club
- CFR Cluj, a Romanian football club
