= AACR =

AACR may refer to:

- Across a Crowded Room, an album by Richard Thompson released in 1985
- American Association for Cancer Research, an organization based in Philadelphia, Pennsylvania
- American Cable and Radio Corporation, a former communications holding company in the middle 20th century previously known as All America Cables and Radio
- Anglo-American Cataloguing Rules, a publication for library professionals
- Association for the Advancement of Civil Rights, a political party in Gibraltar
- Autoritatea Aeronautică Civilă Română ("Romanian Civil Aeronautical Authority")
