= Cluj International Airport =

International airport serving Cluj-Napoca, Romania

Cluj International Airport Aeroportul Internațional „Avram Iancu” Cluj
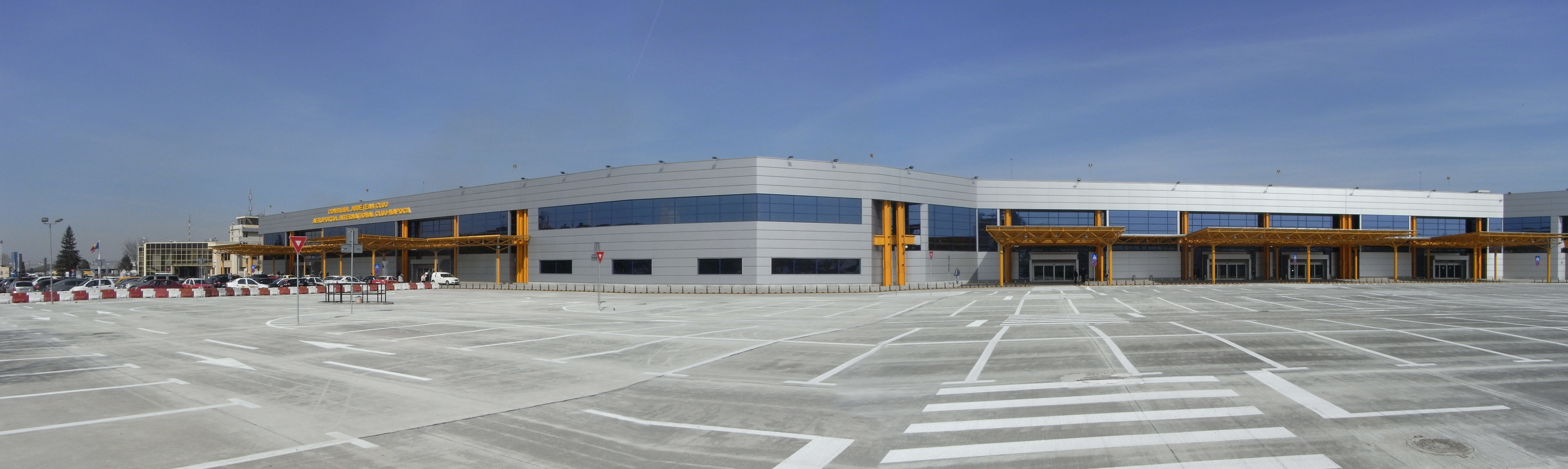
- IATA: CLJ; ICAO: LRCL

Summary
- Airport type: Public
- Owner: Cluj County Council
- Operator: Aeroportul Internațional „Avram Iancu” Cluj R.A.
- Serves: Cluj-Napoca, Romania
- Location: Someșeni, Cluj-Napoca, Romania
- Opened: 1932
- Elevation AMSL: 1,039 ft (317 m)
- Coordinates: 46°47′21″N 023°41′32″E
- Website: www.airportcluj.ro

Map
- Location within Romania

Runways
Direction	Length		Surface
Direction	m	ft	Surface
07/25	2,040	6,693	Concrete

Statistics (2025)
- Passengers: 3,582,134
- Aircraft movements: 30,040
- Cargo (metric tonnes): 6,630.9
- Sources: Romanian AIP; Romanian Airports Association (traffic statistics)

Cluj International Airport (IATA: CLJ, ICAO: LRCL) is an international airport serving Cluj-Napoca, Romania. It is located in the Someșeni district, about 9 km (5.6 mi) east of the city centre. Opened in 1932 as Someșeni Airport, it is named after Romanian revolutionary Avram Iancu.

In 2025, the airport handled over 3.5 million passengers, making it the second-busiest airport in Romania by passenger traffic, after Henri Coandă International Airport in Bucharest.

== History ==
=== Early years ===
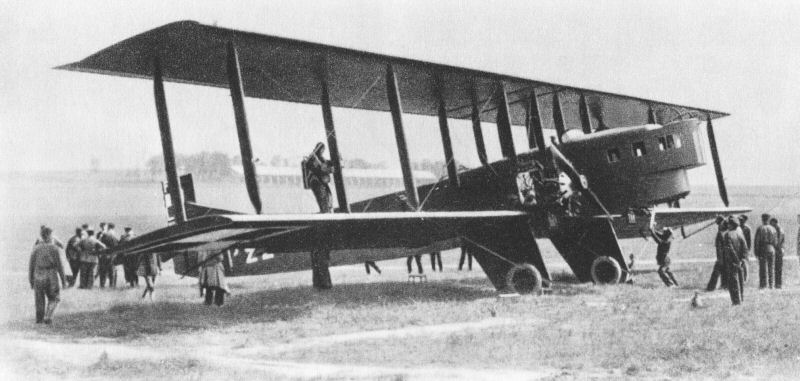
A Farman-Goliath aircraft, similar to the one used on the airport's first flight, in 1937.

The Cluj Airport was founded on 1 April 1932 by the Romanian Ministry of Industry and Trade. Until the civil airport was built, the area was used as a military airfield. On 15 December 1917, the County Council of Kolozsvár (today Cluj-Napoca) gave land in the settlement of Szamosfalva (today the Someșeni district of Cluj-Napoca) in order to develop a military airport. After the Union of Transylvania with Romania, the Someșeni Military Aerodrome was used for the first civil operations by the National Service of Air Navigation (Romanian: Serviciul Național de Navigație Aeriană SNNA). The SNNA was set up in 1928 by the Romanian Ministry of War for opening an air transportation line between Cluj and Bucharest. The first passenger plane landed on 2 August 1928. The first aircraft used was the Farman-Goliath aircraft, a twin-engine plane with space for ten passengers built by the Farman Aviation Works. Later, the Bucharest-Cluj service was operated by LARES (Liniile Aeriene Române Exploatate de Stat, Romanian Airlines Operated by the State) with Junkers F 13 planes.

In 1933, Cluj Airport was declared an International Airport by the Romanian Government. The first international flight, a CSA Czech Airlines Prague-Cluj-Bucharest flight, took place on 11 September 1933. The aircraft used on this route were eight-seat Avia-Fokker aircraft. In the following years, several new routes were opened, such as the Aeroflot Moscow-Cluj-Prague flight, opened on 15 November 1935, which was operated with 14-seat McDonnell Douglas DC-2 twin-engine aircraft, registered as USSR-M25 and USSR-M26. Domestic flights were also operated in this period, such as Cluj-Satu-Mare and Cernăuți-Cluj-Arad using Lockheed Model 10 Electra ten-passenger aircraft and de Havilland Dragon Rapide aircraft. In the late 1930s, the airport recorded steady growth and the employees' number rose from 6 in 1934 to 16 in 1939. The passenger terminal was also built in this period, being inaugurated in 1939.

=== Development since the 1990s ===
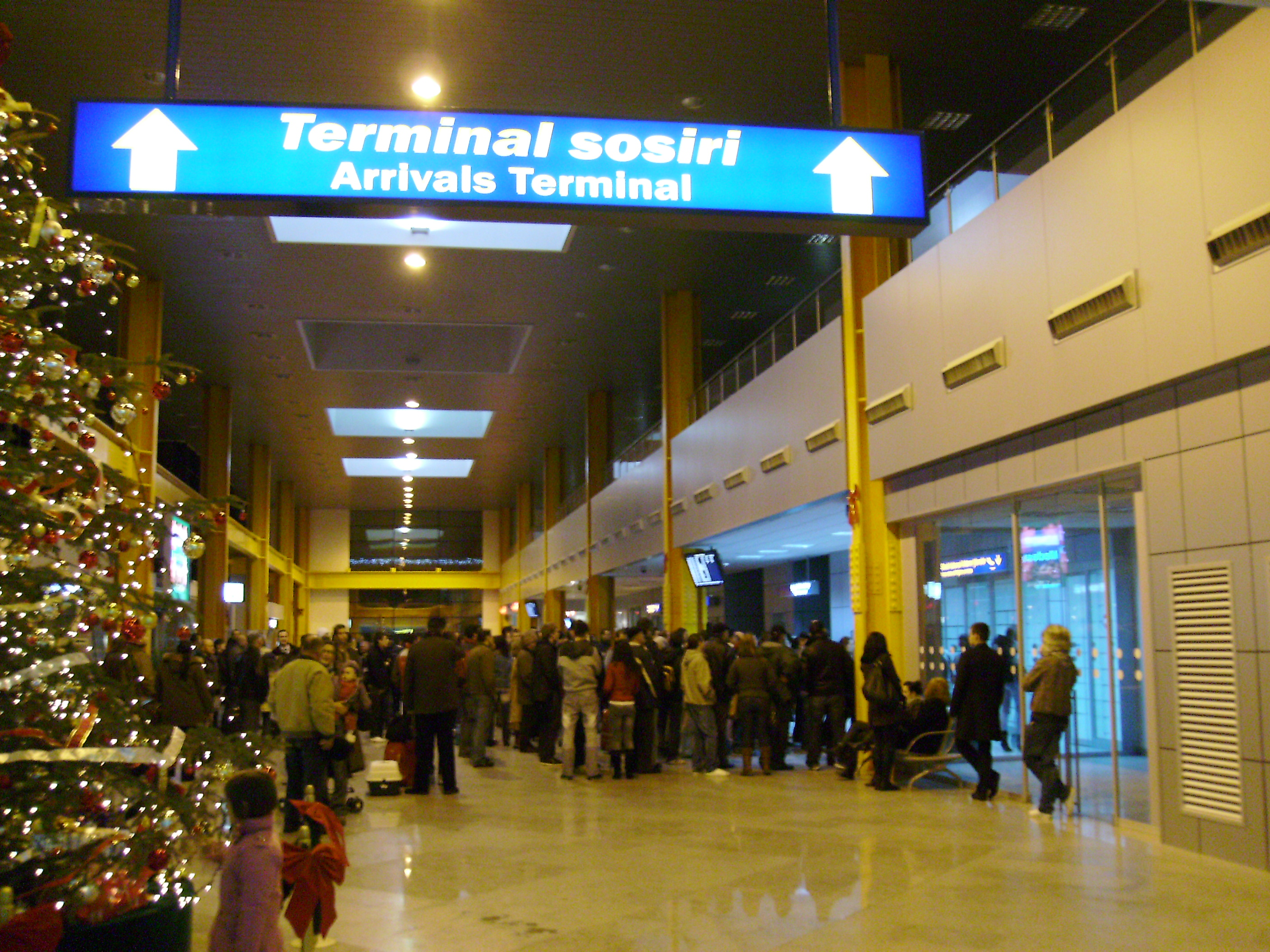
Terminal interior (2009)

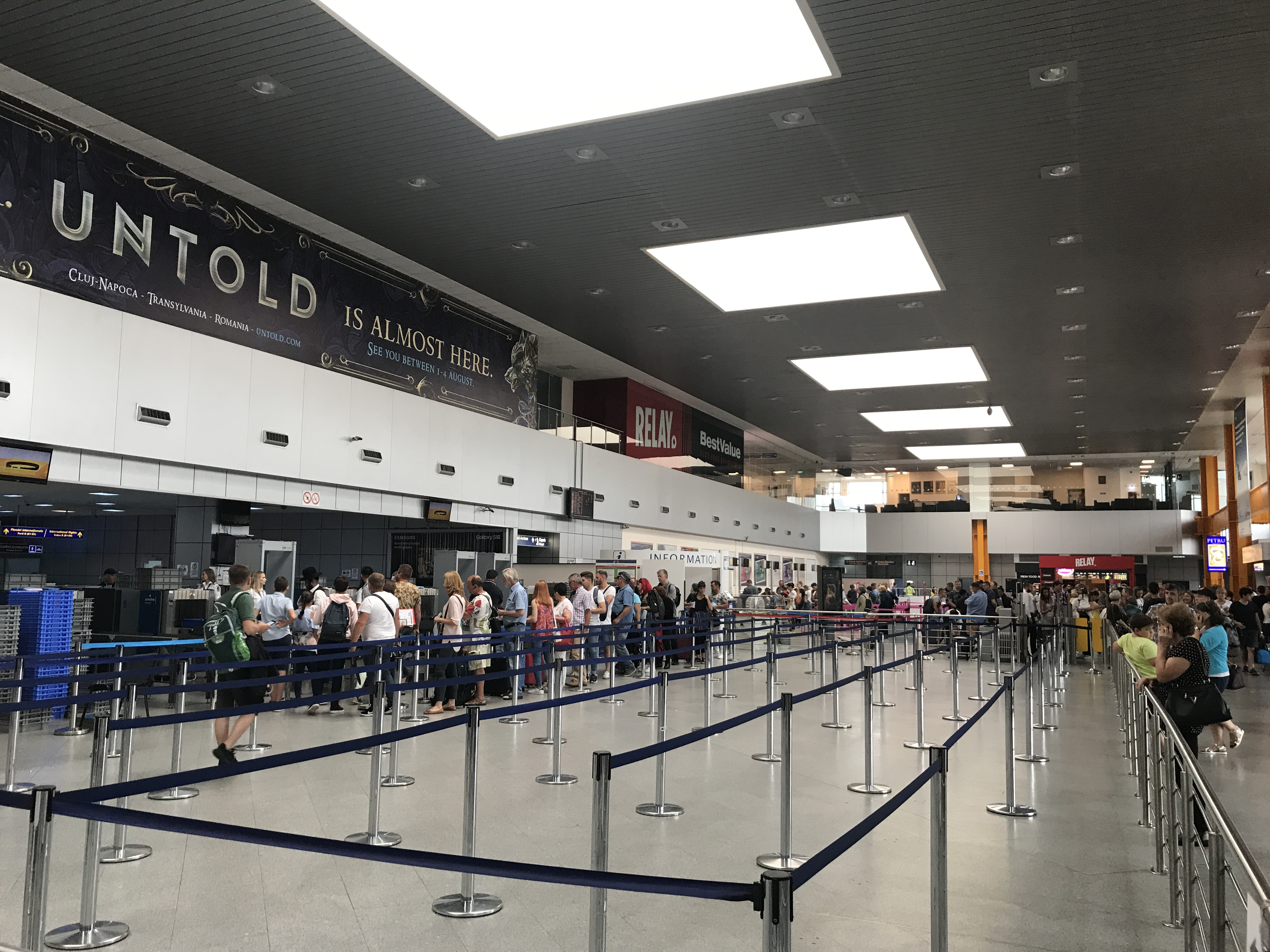
Terminal interior (2019)

The airport remained a domestic airport until September 1996, when it was once again opened to both international passenger and cargo traffic. The extension of the terminal building was also started in 1996 and since August 1997, it is run by the Cluj County Council. By 2001, the extension of the airport building was finished, the runway lighting system was modernized, and an Instrument Landing System (ILS) CAT I was iinstalled.

In 2007 and 2008, the airport posted year-over-year growth of 60% and 93% respectively, reaching over 750,000 passengers in 2008.

The construction of a new terminal, capable of handling 2 million passengers annually, started on 26 June 2007. The 10,812 m^{2} (116,380 sq ft) arrivals hall was inaugurated on 22 May 2008, followed by the new departures hall, with a total area of 16,150 m^{2} (173,800 sq ft), inaugurated on 15 May 2009. The connecting building between the two terminals was inaugurated in November 2009. The total project cost was an estimated €40 million. In February 2009, the ILS equipment was upgraded to CAT II.

Cluj Airport exceeded the 1,000,000 passenger mark in 2010. On 8 September 2011, the construction works for building a new runway of 2,100 m (6,890 ft) began. The work represented the first phase of the investment that aims at a take-off/landing runway of 3,500 m (11,483 ft). The new runway 07/25 officially went into operation on 26 October 2013. The old runway 08/26 became a taxiway, after the new runway opened.

In 2014, ROMATSA held a competition for the creation of a new control tower for Cluj-Napoca Airport. Of the 22 projects that were submitted in the competition, as winner the project of Outline Architecture Office was chosen, an architectural design office based in Bucharest. The tower resembles a tulnic and will have a height of 42 m. The costs for the construction of the new control tower will be borne by ROMATSA.

In June 2023, the airport began work to expand the departure hall and the apron.Opened on 31 May 2024, the 7,200 m^{2} (77,500 sq ft) extension added three more gates to the previous nine.

On 24 November 2023 the Avram Iancu Cluj International Airport celebrated serving its 3,000,000th passenger, becoming the first regional airport in Romania to exceed this threshold.

For the future, the airport development project foresees the construction of the second terminal with an area of 40,000 m^{2} (430,556 sq ft).

== Airlines and destinations ==
The following airlines operate regular scheduled and charter flights to and from Cluj-Napoca:

Airlines	Destinations
Animawings	Athens, Bucharest–Otopeni, Istanbul Vienna; Seasonal: Heraklion, Olbia, Thessaloniki (all flights suspended)
Air Serbia	Belgrade (begins 31 May 2027)
Corendon Airlines	Seasonal: Antalya, Gazipaşa/Alanya, Hurghada
HiSky	Bucharest–Otopeni, Seasonal charter: Hurghada, Sharm El Sheikh
LOT Polish Airlines	Warsaw–Chopin
Lufthansa	Munich
Pegasus Airlines	Istanbul–Sabiha Gökçen
Ryanair	Beauvais, Bergamo, Charleroi, Dublin, London–Stansted
Sky Express	Seasonal charter: Heraklion, Rhodes
SkyUp	Charter: Hurghada, Sharm El Sheikh
Swiss International Air Lines	Zürich
TAROM	Bucharest–Otopeni
Turkish Airlines	Istanbul
Wizz Air	Alicante, Barcelona, Basel/Mulhouse, Beauvais, Bergamo, Berlin, Bologna, Castellón, Charleroi, Dortmund, Eindhoven, Hahn, Leeds/Bradford, Lisbon, London–Luton, Lyon, Madrid, Málaga, Malmö, Memmingen, Milan–Malpensa, Rome–Fiumicino, Sandefjord, Stockholm–Skavsta, Stuttgart, Tel Aviv, Valencia, Vienna, Zaragoza; Seasonal: Abu Dhabi (resumes 27 October 2026), Antalya, Bari, Catania, Dubrovnik, Heraklion, Larnaca, Marrakesh, Naples, Palma de Mallorca

== Statistics ==
Annual revenue passenger, aircraft movements and cargo statistics
Year	Passengers (% change from prior year)	Movements (% change from prior year)	Tones (% change from prior year)
2004	162,668(+34.4%)	6,697(+52.9%)	138(+29.8%)
2005	202,556(+24.5%)	8,018(+19.7%)	213(+54.3%)
2006	244,366(+20.6%)	8,904(+11.1%)	187(-12.2%)
2007	390,521(+59.8%)	9,206(+3.4%)	254(+35.8%)
2008	752,181(+92.6%)	12,025(+30.6%)	413(+62.6%)
2009	834,400(+10.9%)	13,489(+12.2%)	385(-6.8%)
2010	1,028,907(+23.3%)	16,352(+21.2%%)	354(-8.1%)
2011	1,004,855(-2.3%)	14,064(-13.9%)	744(+101.7%)
2012	931,999(-7.2%)	–	885(+18.9%)
2013	1,036,438(+11.2%)	11,743	1,262(+42.6%)
2014	1,182,047(+14.0%)	12,710(+8.2%)	1,332(+5.5%)
2015	1,487,603(+25.8%)	14,667(+15.4%)	1,680(+26.1%)
2016	1,880,171(+26.5%)	19,152(+30.6%)	2,100(+25%)
2017	2,699,286(+43.6%)	24,476(+27.8%)	2,927(+39%)
2018	2,782,401(+3.1%)	23,880(-2.4%)	2,986(+2%)
2019	2,923,845(+4.9%)	24,450(+2.4%)	3,457(+15.8%)
2020	906,651(-68.9%)	12,307(-49.6%)	3,904(+12.9%)
2021	1,463,207(+61.4%)	17,540(+42.5%)	5,670(+45.2%)
2022	2,644,968(+80.8%)	23,787(+35.6%)	6,935.4(+22.3%)
2023	3,240,750(+22.5%)	27,464(+15.5%)	7,417.7(+6.9%)
2024	3,266,447(+0.8%)	27,164(-1.1%)	7,216.1(-2.7%)
2025	3,582,134(+9.7%)	30,040(+10.6%)	6,630.9(-8.1%)

Monthly traffic figures (2020, 2021, 2022, 2023, 2024, 2025 & 2026)
Month	2020	2021	2022	2023	2024	Change 2024 vs. 2023	2025	Change 2025 vs. 2024	2026	Change 2025 vs. 2024	YTD (2026)
January	190,848	40,321	107,538	200,655	207,451	▲3.4%	216,798	▲4.5%	220,568	▲1.7%	220,568
February	180,148	29,333	92,718	187,686	203,685	▲8.5%	211,381	▲3.8%	230,495	▲9.0%	451,063
March	85,204	37,954	133,304	211,882	222,883	▲5.2%	244,811	▲9.8%	258,062	▲5.4%	709,126
April	14,370	64,437	222,519	280,072	246,199	▼12.1%	286,840	▲16.5%	299,609	▲4.4%	1,008,735
May	14,730	83,300	241,694	289,749	271,017	▼6.5%	305,115	▲12.6%	314,565	▲3.1%	1,323,300
June	18,710	130,314	262,709	310,316	297,519	▼4.1%	338,756	▲13.9%			
July	83,953	216,829	295,549	349,951	339,456	▼2.9%	378,096	▲11.4%			
August	100,311	249,863	338,127	356,078	354,961	▼0.3%	389,264	▲9.7%			
September	83,277	223,490	286,280	315,461	354,954	▲12.5%	358,075	▲0.9%			
October	56,927	152,400	262,409	290,999	309,059	▲6.2%	329,318	▲6.6%			
November	28,375	103,870	198,842	227,778	236,193	▲3.7%	263,920	▲11.7%			
December	49,798	131,096	203,279	220,123	223,070	▲1.3%	259,760	▲16.4%			

Busiest routes from Avram Iancu International Airport (2018)
Rank	Airport	Passengers	Carriers
1	Bucharest	490,428	Blue Air, TAROM, Wizz Air
2	London - Luton	315,630	Blue Air, Wizz Air
3	Munich	163,917	Lufthansa
4	Bergamo	110,588	Wizz Air
5	Paris - Beauvais	101,013	Wizz Air
6	Barcelona	93,467	Vueling, Wizz Air
7	Bologna	77,194	Wizz Air
8	Rome - Ciampino Airport	69,914	Wizz Air
9	Charleroi	69,507	Wizz Air
10	Madrid	66,463	Wizz Air
11	Dortmund	66,453	Wizz Air
12	Tel Aviv - Ben Gurion Airport	65,944	Blue Air, Wizz Air
13	Eindhoven	50,554	Wizz Air
14	Dublin	48,930	Blue Air
15	Frankfurt am Main Airport	48,732	Lufthansa
16	Basel/Mulhouse Airport	45,367	Wizz Air
17	Valencia	43,355	Wizz Air
18	Zaragoza	43,198	Wizz Air
^{Source: Eurostat}

Busiest routes by country from Avram Iancu International Airport (2022)
Rank	Country	Passengers 2022	Carriers
1	United Kingdom	383,345	Blue Air, Ryanair, Wizz Air
2	Spain	357,733	Blue Air, Wizz Air
3	Germany	357,131	Lufthansa, Wizz Air
4	Italy	319,934	Wizz Air
5	Romania	313,026	Blue Air, HiSky, TAROM
6	France	206,659	Blue Air, Wizz Air
7	Belgium	74,248	Wizz Air
8	Greece	71,034	Animawings, Blue Air, Hello Air, Hello Jet, HiSky, Tarom, Wizz Air
9	Turkey	68,394	Aerro Direck, Air Bucharest, Animawings, Blue Air, Corendon Airlines, Hello Jet, HiSky, Tailwind, Tarom
10	Ireland	59,756	Blue Air, HiSky, Ryanair
^{Source: Eurostat}

== Ground transportation ==
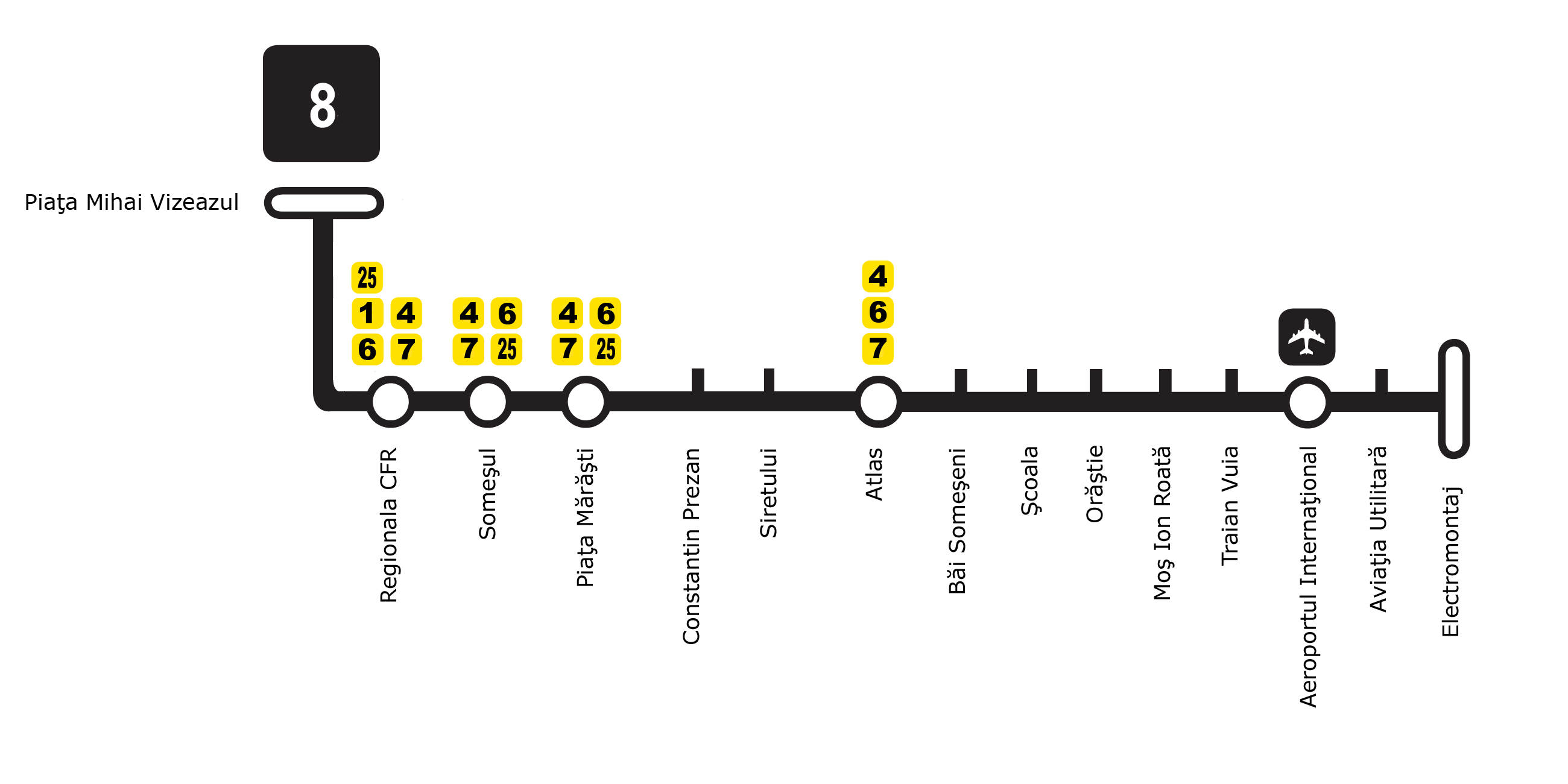
CTP Cluj bus route 8

=== Road ===
The airport is located 8 km (5.0 mi) east of the city centre on the European route E576. The drive from the city centre takes about 20 minutes.

=== Public transportation ===
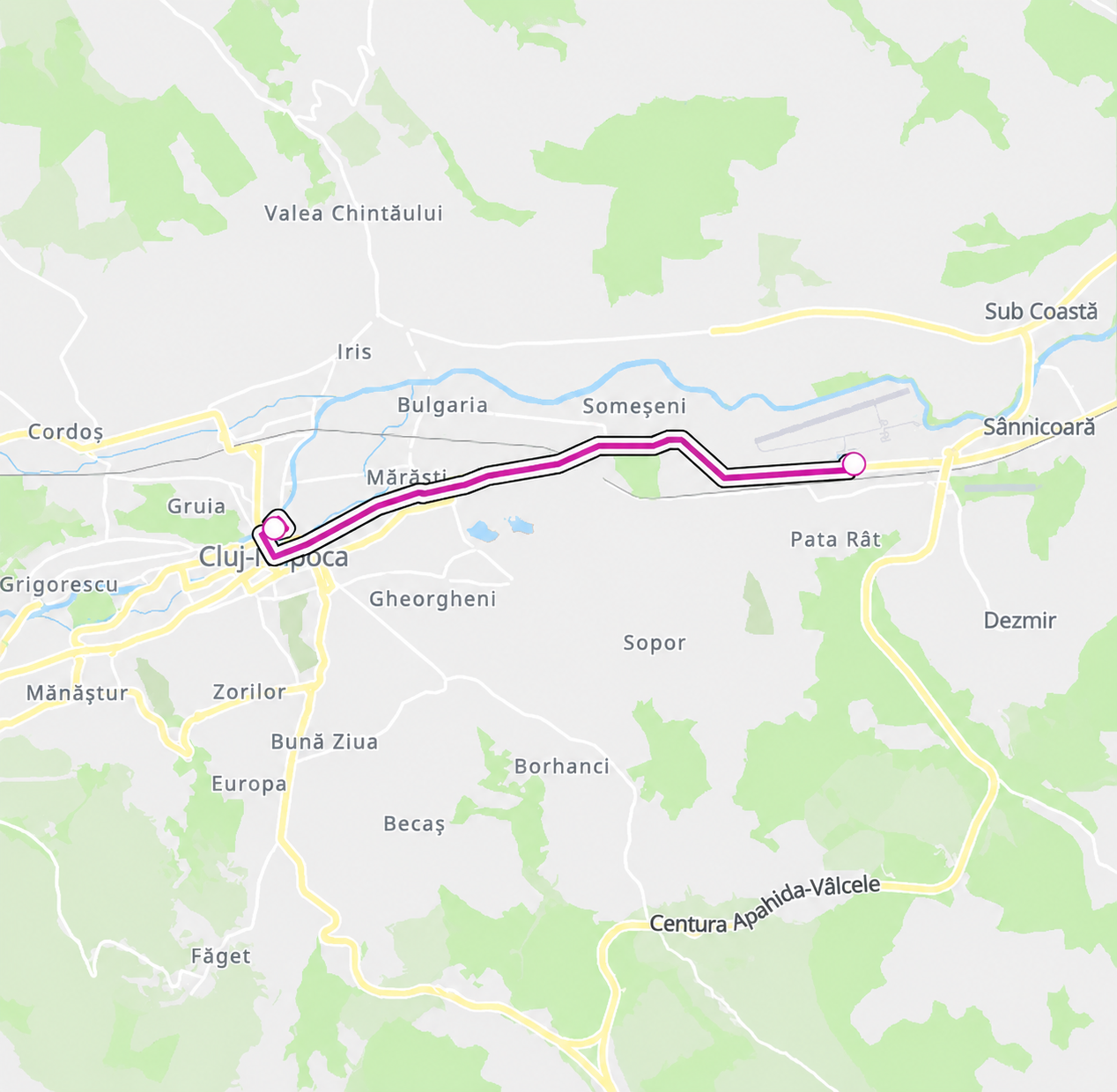
The route of the A1express line back and forth from Cluj-Napoca Airport to Mihai Viteazul Square

CTP Cluj Napoca, the local public transport company, operates its trolleybus No. 8 that connects the airport with the Mihai Viteazul Square in the City Center and trolleybus No. 5 to the Main Rail Station. Other suburban lines connects the airport to the neighboring localities.The Mihai Viteazul Square may be reached directly from the airport exit via the A1E express line, which has no stops along the way.

== Accidents and incidents ==
- On 5 September 1986 at about 19:45, a fully loaded Antonov An-24RV aircraft departed Bucharest Otopeni Airport, bound for Cluj-Napoca. When the landing procedure began, one of the flight attendants, Aurelia Grigore, realized that the aircraft was landing at higher than normal speed. When the main landing gear touched the ground, it bounced repeatedly until the aircraft stopped. The front of the aircraft was on fire. Grigore realized they had an emergency situation. With her flight attendant colleague, she decided to start deplaning passengers. She opened the emergency exit and she let the stairs down, but the stairs weren't touching the ground because the front gear was broken. She was helped by Emil Hossu, a famous actor. "He was one of the few people that didn't panic and helped us evacuate the aircraft in safety", said Grigore. After evacuating the passengers they returned to help the pilots who were trapped in the cockpit. "The cockpit was on fire and we lost any faith that we could save them". The next moments were horrible for all passengers and flight crew. The aircraft was destroyed by flames and with the pilots still on board. After 10 minutes, they saw one of the copilots trying to escape through a window. "He told us his foot was stuck and that he couldn't get it out. We tried to help him, but we couldn't. Finally, he managed to get out of the aircraft on fire. He was completely burned, you couldn't even look at him. It was terrible. The other 2 pilots burned alive as we watched them, helpless". The copilot died also. He was transported to the ER but died the next day because of the burns. The authorities said that the accident was due to an equipment malfunction. The 3 pilots were the only casualties.

== See also ==
- Aviation in Romania
- List of airports in Romania
  - List of the busiest airports in Romania
- Transport in Romania
