= Medallion Air =

Romanian charter airline

IATA	ICAO	Call sign
-	MDP	MEDALS
- Founded: 2009
- Ceased operations: July 2013 (Merged into Ten Airways)
- Hubs: Mihail Kogălniceanu International Airport
- Fleet size: 4
- Headquarters: Bucharest, Romania
- Website: http://www.medallionair.ro/

Medallion Air was a charter airline based in Sector 1, Bucharest, Romania. Its main base was Mihail Kogălniceanu International Airport.

In July 2013, the airline declared bankruptcy and list its license as part of financial insolvency.

== Fleet ==
The Medallion Air aviation company went into bankruptcy in July 2013 and, as of this date, the Medallion Air fleet belonged to the new Romanian charter airline Ten Airways.

Aircraft	In service	Orders	Passengers	Notes
McDonnell Douglas MD-83	0	0	165	Feb 2013
Total	0	0		July 2013
