= Legend Airlines (Romania) =

Romanian airline

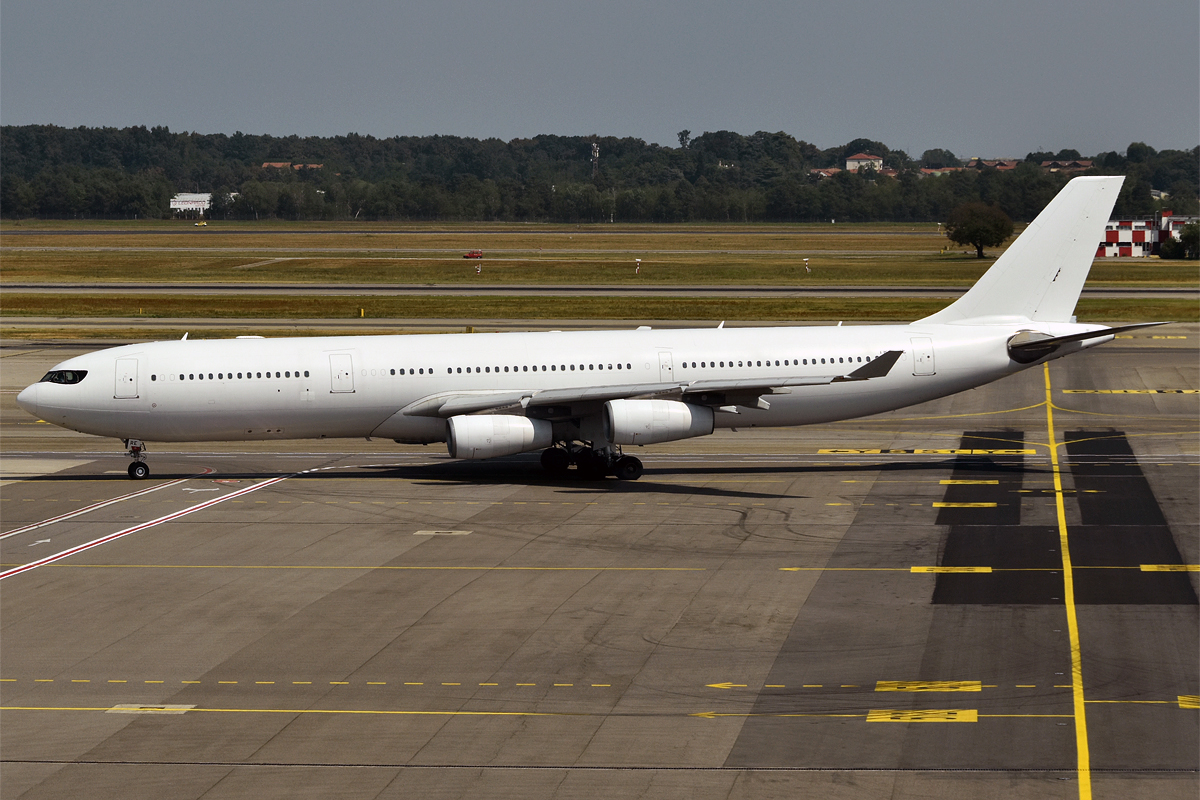
IATA	ICAO	Call sign
LZ	LAL	LEGEND AIRLINES
- Founded: July 20, 2020; 6 years ago
- Ceased operations: January 14, 2026; 9 months ago
- Operating bases: Bucharest
- Fleet size: 0
- Headquarters: Voluntari, Romania
- Key people: Ramin Youresh; Timor Shah Shahab
- Employees: 34 (2024)
- Website: legendairlines.ro

Legend Airlines SRL was a Romanian charter airline which was established in 2020. It was owned by two Afghan shareholders: Ramin Youresh, a former executive of Kam Air, was the majority shareholder, CEO and accountable manager while Timor Shah Shahab held 45% of the shares.

On 14 January 2026, the airline ceased all flight operations indefinitely following the retirement of its entire fleet of Airbus A340 aircraft. On 28 May 2026, it was reported that the Romanian Civil Aeronautical Authority had suspended the air operator's certificate of Legend Airlines. The AOC was subsequently revoked on 1 October 2026.

== Fleet ==
Initially, Legend Airlines' air operator's certificate only listed a single Cessna 172. In 2022, the airline acquired two Airbus A340-300 aircraft from Air Belgium. By December 2024, the airline operated three A340-300, with each configured for only economy class with 324 seats available.

== Operations ==
Customers of the charter airline include Garuda Indonesia, Neos Air and SpiceJet. In 2024, Legend Airlines carried out 700 flights.

== Smuggling and human trafficking investigations ==
On July 15, 2023, Legend Airlines operated a flight from Fujairah, United Arab Emirates to San Salvador, El Salvador. Upon landing, officials refused to connect the jet bridge, thus not allowing the passengers to disembark. According to a crew member, several passengers were planning to travel onward to Mexico and enter the United States without permission from there.

A Legend flight from Châlons Vatry Airport to Managua, Nicaragua on December 9, 2023 was believed to have African migrants on board who wanted to enter the United States without permission.

On December 21, 2023, one of their aircraft landed in Châlons Vatry Airport for refueling, with the next leg of the flight scheduled to Nicaragua. However, the aircraft was grounded by the police following an anonymous tip that suggested there may be human trafficking victims on board. The 303 passengers had to spend two nights on camp beds in the airport while the investigation was carried out. There were 13 unaccompanied minors on board. The airport was sealed off and French local authorities expected at least a dozen of the passengers to apply for asylum in France. Two passengers were detained. The 30 crew members were not detained. After two days the aircraft was cleared to go to Mumbai. The plane arrived in India with 276 Indians on board. 25 passengers had remained in France and requested asylum. India considers the returnees "victims of the immigration racket" and they do not face any charges within India.

When asked about the grounding of the aircraft in France, Liliana Bakayoko, a lawyer representing Legend Airlines, "did not rule out the possibility of illegitimate migration".

== See also ==
- List of airlines of Romania
