= Banat Air Flight 166 =

1995 aviation accident

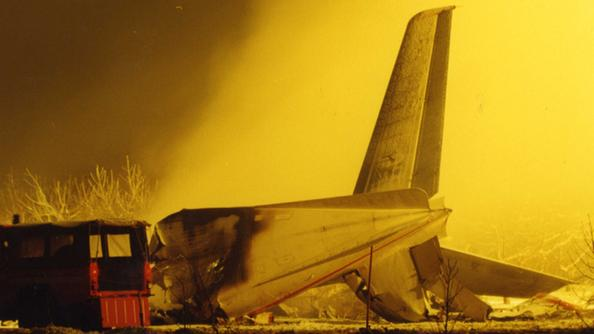
- The crash site of Flight 166

Accident
- Date: 13 December 1995
- Summary: Loss of control on take-off
- Site: Colombare - Fiorio near Verona Airport, Verona, Italy; 45°22′34.56″N 10°51′24.82″E

Aircraft
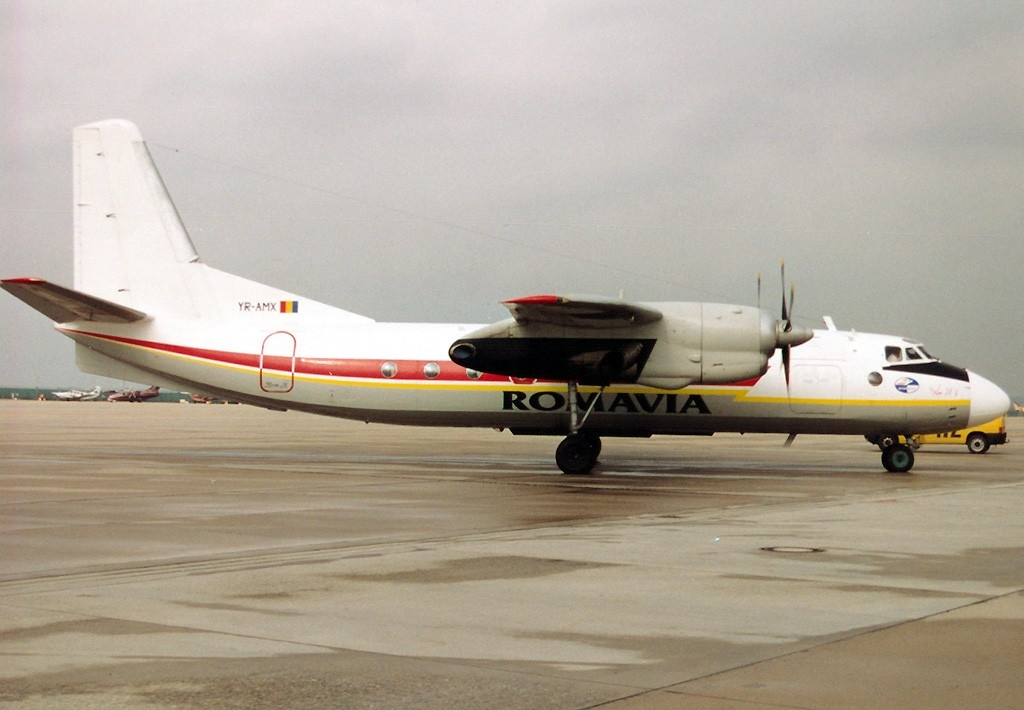
- An Antonov An-24 similar to the accident aircraft
- Aircraft type: Antonov An-24B
- Operator: Banat Air (chartered from Romavia)
- Registration: YR-AMR
- Flight origin: Verona–Villafranca Airport
- Destination: Timișoara International Airport
- Occupants: 49
- Passengers: 41
- Crew: 8
- Fatalities: 49
- Survivors: 0

Banat Air Flight 166 was an Antonov An-24 (registration YR-AMR) chartered on 13 December 1995 from Romavia by Banat Air.

It was due to fly from Verona, Italy, to Timișoara, Romania, when it crashed shortly after take-off, killing all eight crewmembers and 41 passengers. It later emerged that the aircraft was severely overloaded and its wings were contaminated with ice and snow. The accident was the 116th loss of an Antonov 24.

== Accident ==
Whilst parked in parking spot B6 at Verona-Villafranca Airport, snow fell continuously and the outside temperature was 0 °C. After forty-one passengers boarded Flight 166 to Romania, the pilot declined to have the plane deiced. At just past 19:30 local time, the aircraft taxied to the end of runway 23; however, heavy traffic delayed the departure.

When the Banat Air flight was cleared for takeoff, the outside temperature was below the freezing point. Shortly after lifting off, the aircraft reached its maximum speed. Banking to the right, the airspeed dropped dramatically, and so the pilot applied nose down elevator, causing the speed to increase again. Continuing their right hand bank, the flight crew again applied nose up elevator. The speed then dropped significantly, and the plane banked at sixty seven degrees. The pilots were unable to regain control of the plane and it struck the ground right-wing first, breaking up and bursting into flames.

== Investigation ==
Investigators concluded that there were multiple causes for the accident, including the disruption of airflow over the wings due to ice formation on the wings, due to the plane taking off without being de-iced. They also determined that spatial disorientation and the plane being overloaded by about 2000 kilograms played key parts in the accident.

== See also ==
- Aviation safety
- List of accidents and incidents involving commercial aircraft
