= Someșeni =

Coordinates: 46°47′0″N 023°41′0″E

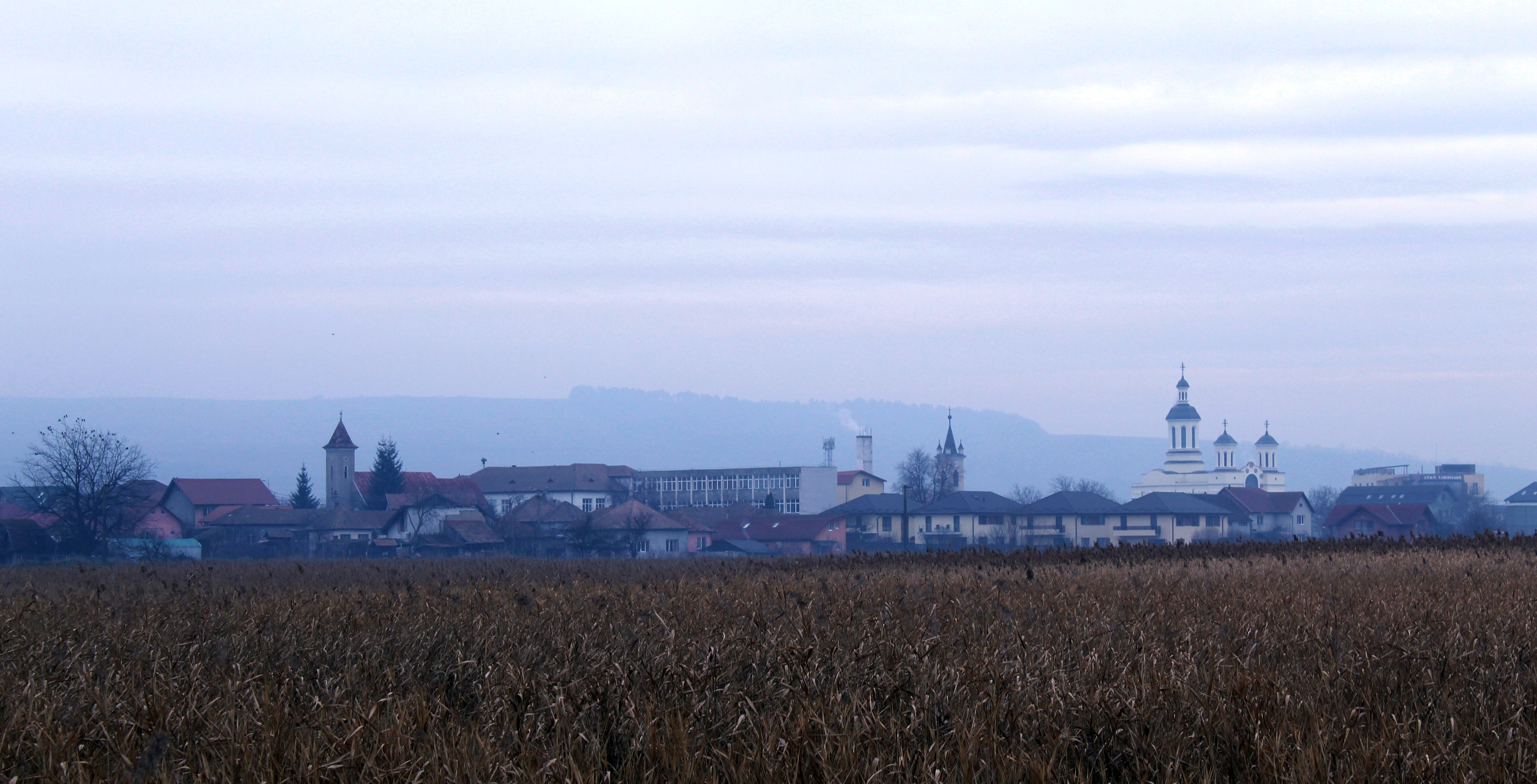
View of Someșeni

Someșeni (formerly known as Someșfalău; German: Mikelsdorf; Hungarian: Szamosfalva) is a largely residential neighbourhood of Cluj-Napoca, Romania.

== History ==
In the 5th century, the area was inhabited by Gepids, as evidenced by the Treasure of Someșeni which was discovered in 1963.

Originally a separate locality, Someșeni was first mentioned in a document from 1280. The Catholic church was built in the 13th century and still retains elements of Romanesque architecture.

During the 20th century, the village was popular as a wellness tourism destination due to its well-known baths. They have since fallen into disrepair.

The Cluj Airport was established here on April 1, 1932, by the Romanian Ministry of Industry and Trade; the airport was declared an International Airport in 1933.

Someșeni ceased to function as a separate entity and was attached to Cluj in 1968.

== Gallery ==
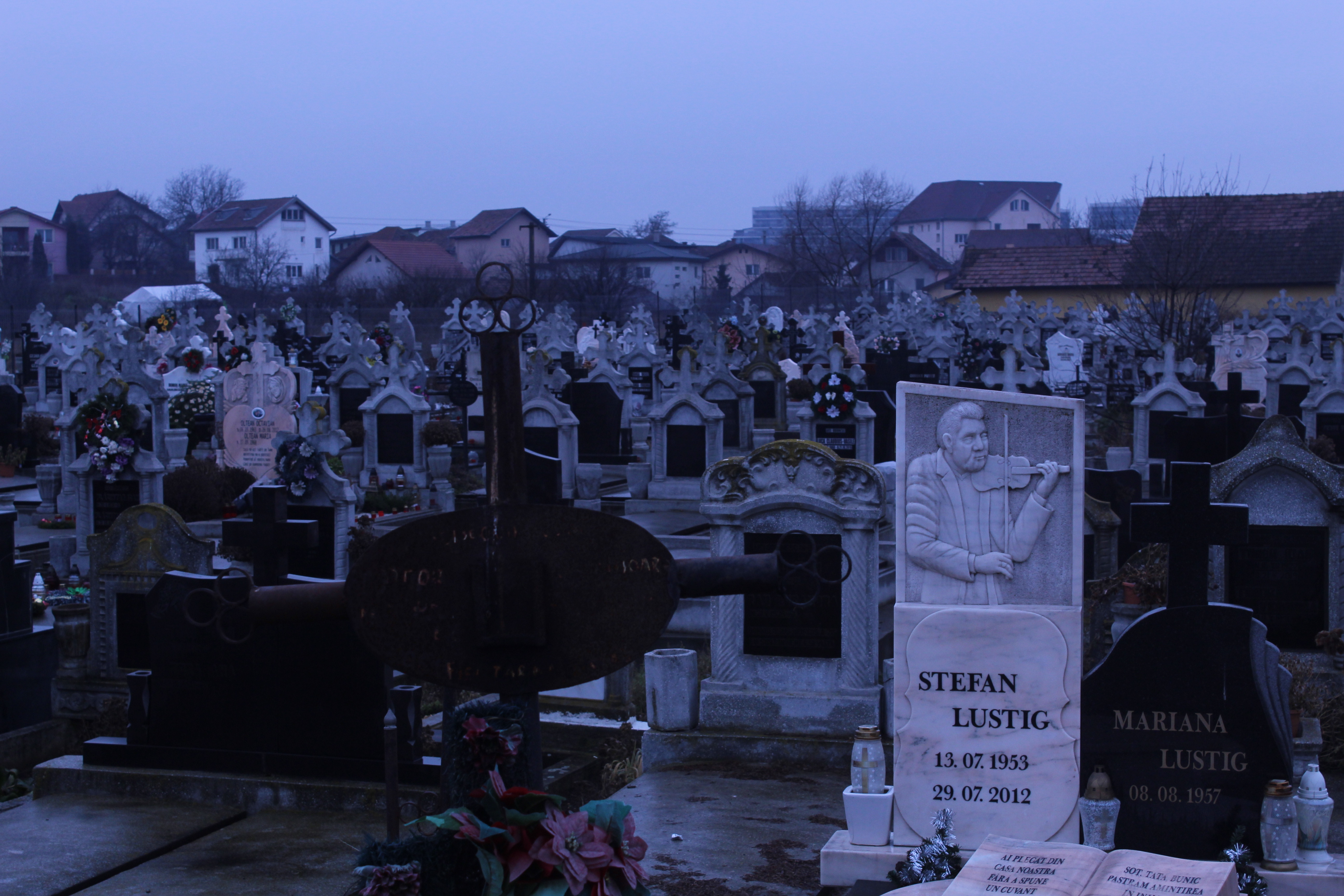
Someșeni Cemetery

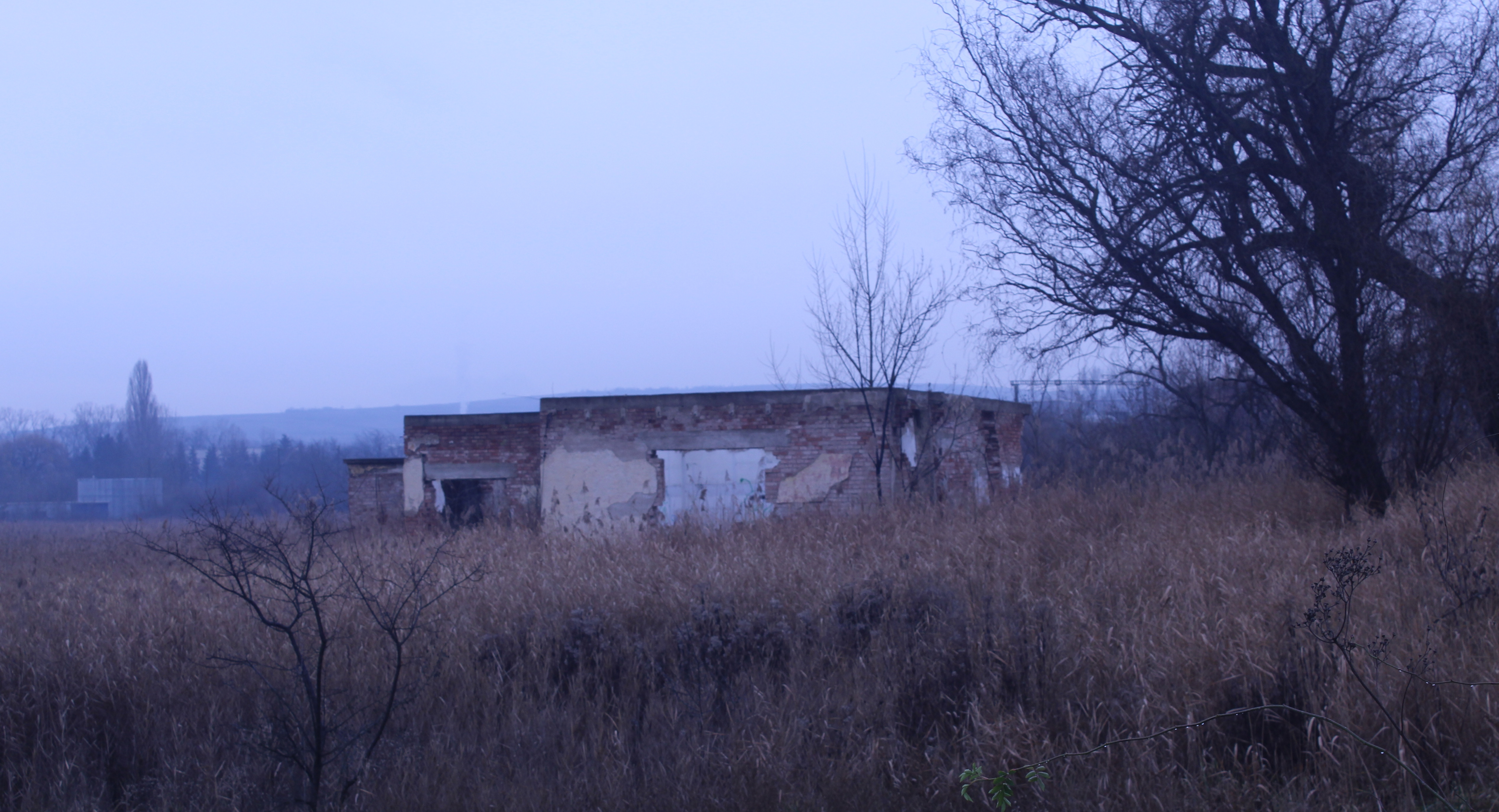
The abandoned Someșeni baths

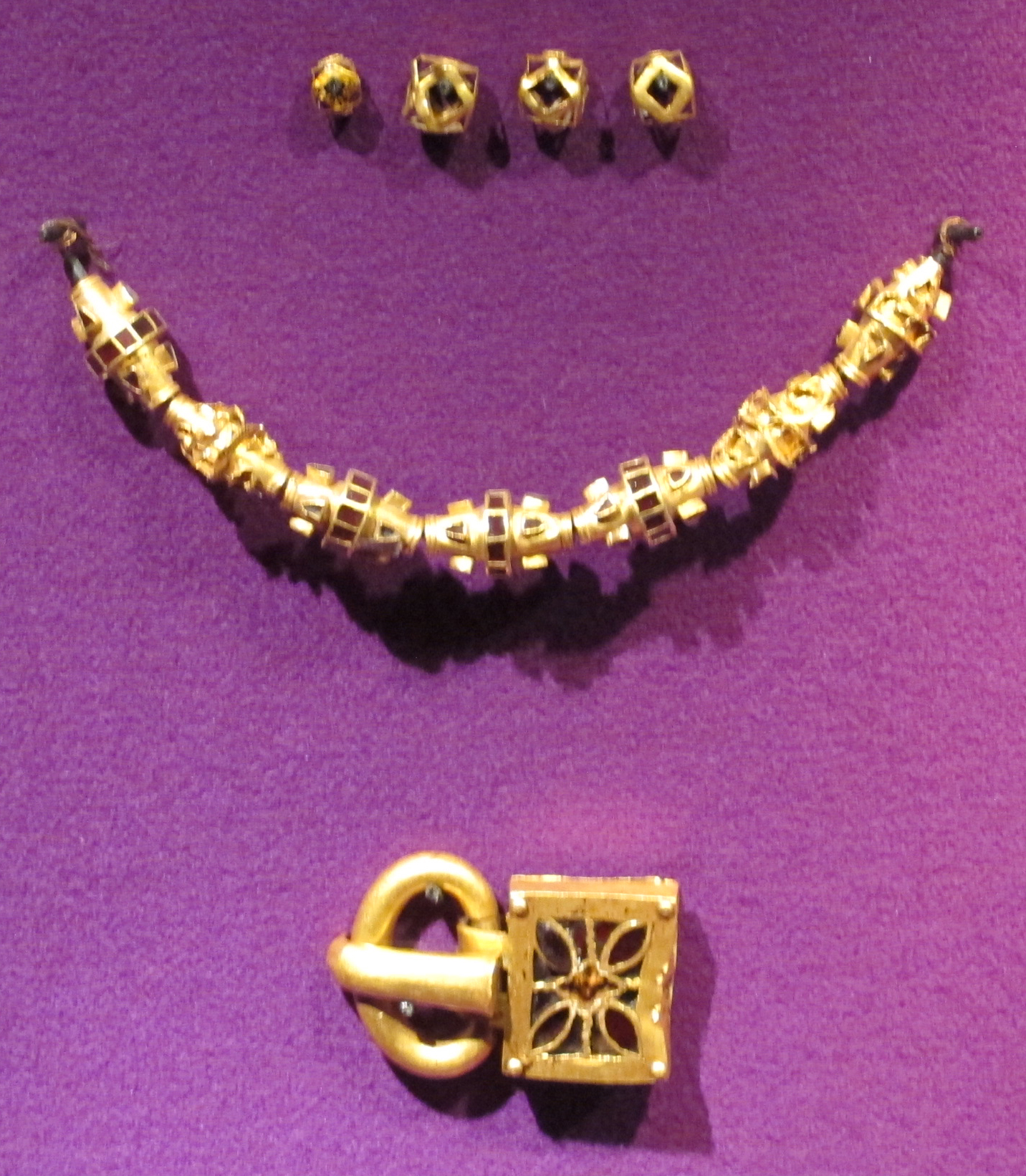
Treasure of Someșeni
