= Bees Airlines =

Low-cost airline of Romania

Bees Airlines S.R.L.

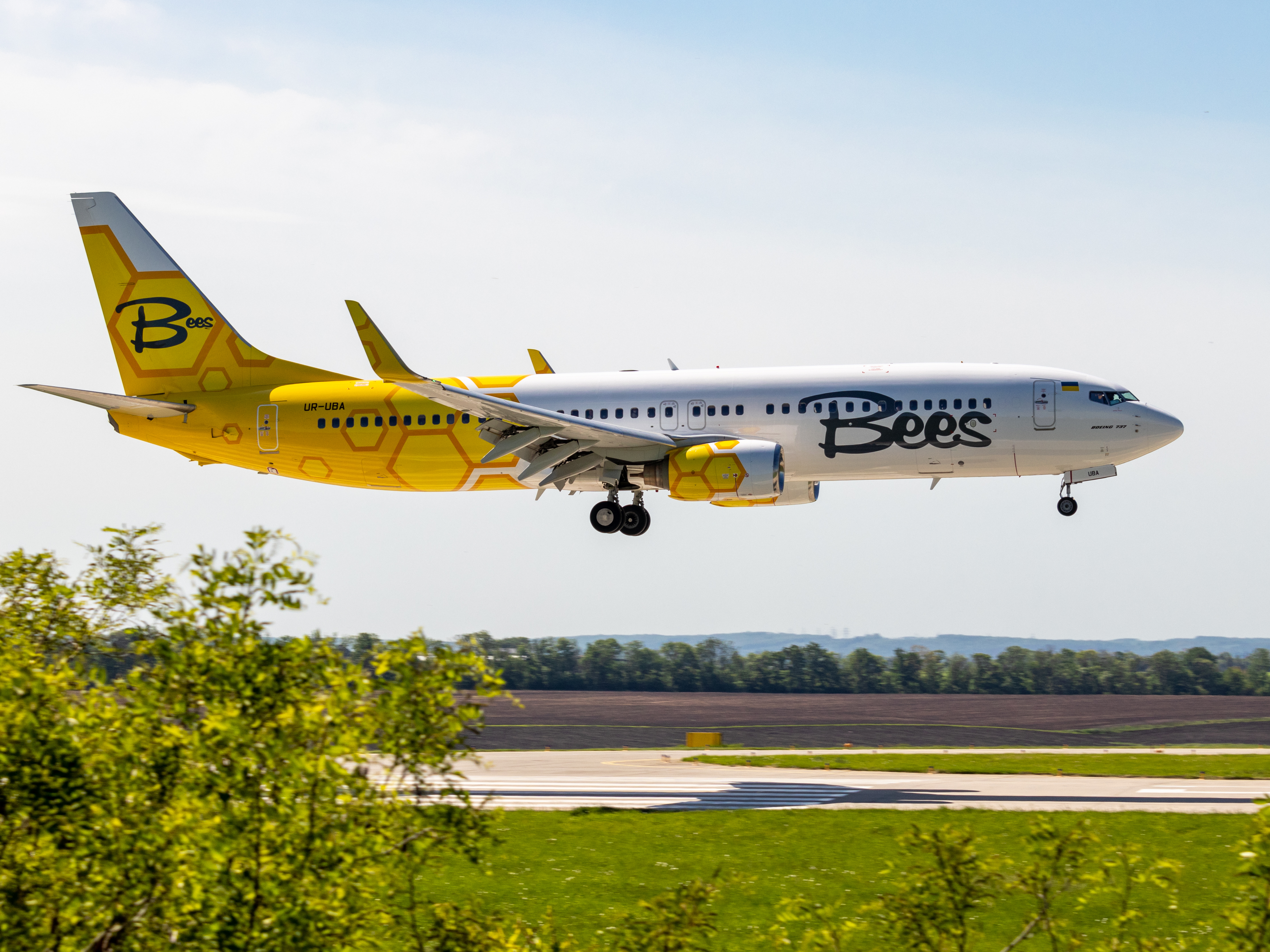
- Bees Airlines 737-800
IATA	ICAO	Call sign
E8	BES	SKYBEES
- Founded: 2023
- Commenced operations: 30 March 2024
- Ceased operations: 1 February 2025
- Operating bases: Bucharest Henri Coandă International Airport
- Secondary hubs: Suceava Ștefan cel Mare International Airport
- Fleet size: 1
- Destinations: 11
- Headquarters: Bucharest, Romania
- Key people: Victor Antohe, CEO
- Website: BeesRomania.Aero

Bees Airlines was a Romanian low-cost airline headquartered in Bucharest, Romania, with its main base being Henri Coandă International Airport.

== History ==
Established in 2023, the airline initially said on its website that it would operate charter flights to Asia, Europe and Africa.

In March 2024 it was announced that Bees Airlines has passed all necessary procedures and obtained the Air Operator Certificate (AOC) that allows the airline to start its operational activity. Since then, the airline has expanded, with new scheduled routes to commence in August 2024.

Despite sharing the same name and branding as the former Ukrainian LCC Bees Airline, which ceased operations following the Russian invasion of Ukraine in February 2022 and since had its AOC revoked—the Romanian carrier confirmed that it has different investors and management. Only the trademark was bought from the former Ukrainian company.

On 14 January 2025, the Romanian civil aviation authority suspended the air operator's certificate of Bees Airlines. This happened after the airline suspended its flight operations in December 2024. Reportedly, the suspension was due to struggles in paying the staff as the numbers of passengers was lower than expected. The AOC was later revoked on 1 February 2025.

== Destinations ==
As of December 2024, Bees Airlines operated to the following destinations

Country	City	Airport	Notes	Refs
Czech Republic	Prague	Václav Havel Airport Prague		
Egypt	Hurghada	Hurghada International Airport	Seasonal charter	
Germany	Karlsruhe / Baden-Baden	Karlsruhe/Baden-Baden Airport		
Greece	Heraklion	Heraklion International Airport "Nikos Kazantzakis"	Terminated	
Israel	Tel Aviv	David Ben Gurion International Airport		
Italy	Bergamo	Orio al Serio International Airport		
Italy	Bologna	Bologna Guglielmo Marconi Airport		
Italy	Verona	Verona Villafranca Airport		
Moldova	Chișinău	Chișinău International Airport	Secondary Base	
Romania	Bucharest	Bucharest Henri Coandă International Airport	Base	
Romania	Suceava	Suceava Ștefan cel Mare International Airport	Secondary Base	
Romania	Timișoara	Timișoara Traian Vuia International Airport	Seasonal charter	

== Fleet ==
As of December 2024, Bees Airlines operated the following aircraft:

Bees Airlines fleet
Aircraft	In service	Orders	Passengers			Notes
Aircraft	In service	Orders	C	Y	Total	Notes
Airbus A320-200	1	—	—	180	180	
Total	1	—				
