= Fly Romania =

Romanian airline

IATA	ICAO	Call sign
X5	OTJ	TENDER AIR
- Founded: 2014
- Commenced operations: 2014
- Ceased operations: 2014
- Operating bases: List of bases: Bucharest-Henri Coandă; Timișoara; Tulcea
- Fleet size: 2
- Destinations: 9
- Headquarters: Bucharest, Romania
- Key people: Ovidiu Tender (CEO)
- Website: flyromania.com

Fly Romania was a brand of the Romanian airline Ten Airways for low-cost operations, which operated for a few months only from Bucharest-Henri Coandă, Timișoara and Tulcea. The company slogan was It's about you.

== History ==
The brand started operations on 15 May 2014. It competed against other European low-cost airlines including Wizz Air, Blue Air, and EasyJet. Fly Romania started with operations to nine destinations all year round with additional charter flights from Bucharest-Henri Coandă to Antalya. All flights were operated by Ten Airways.

As of 19 August 2014, Fly Romania cancelled all remaining flights for the entire summer schedule due to low customer demand. On 29 September 2014, Fly Romania filed for bankruptcy.

== Fleet ==
The flights were operated with McDonnell Douglas MD-80 aircraft (MD-82 and MD-83), with 160 to 170 seating capacity.

== Destinations ==
The company flew to destinations that most of them were not served by the other companies operating in Romania at the time.

^{Hub}	Hub
^{*}	Focus city
^{+}	Future destination
^{Ø}	Charter
^{#}	Terminated destination

City	Country	IATA	ICAO	Airport	Notes
Antalya	Turkey	AYT	LTAI	Antalya Airport	Seasonal charter
Bergamo	Italy	BGY	LIME	Il Caravaggio International Airport	suspended
Bucharest	Romania	OTP	LROP	Henri Coandă International Airport ^{[base]}	suspended
Genoa	Italy	GOA	LIMJ	Genoa Airport	suspended
Kirchberg	Germany	HHN	EDFH	Frankfurt-Hahn Airport	suspended
Palermo	Italy	PMO	LICJ	Falcone–Borsellino Airport	suspended
Reus	Spain	REU	LERS	Reus Airport	suspended
Timișoara	Romania	TSR	LRTR	Traian Vuia International Airport ^{[base]}	suspended
Tulcea	Romania	TCE	LRTC	Tulcea Airport ^{[base]}	suspended
Verona	Italy	VRN	LIPX	Verona Villafranca Airport	suspended
