= Ovidiu Tender =

Romanian businessman (born 1956)

Ovidiu Tender (born on 1956 in Timișoara) is a Romanian businessman. Through Tender SA, he controls several companies that carry on in fields such as: energetic, oil and gas industry services, geological prospecting, road infrastructure, real estate, agriculture, tourism and aviation. He owns an airline flying in areas like Romania, Greece, Senegal, Ivory Coast through Ten Airways company. Tender companies also work in Middle East, India, North Africa and Europe. The Prospecțiuni Company has businesses in Iran, Morocco, Portugal, India and Greece. In Serbia, Tender bought a medicament production company, a telecommunication company, a spa resort and a tobacco fermentation factory. He owns Internațional Hotel in Timișoara, through his Intercenter Service Company, a hotel in Greece, on Aegina Island, and the Johann Strauss Hotel in Bucharest.

== Business Strategy ==
The main business goal of the Romanian businessman is the profitability of companies in a precarious financial situation. Therefore, over time, Ovidiu Tender bought more bankrupt companies and then later sold them to other companies. In this respect, the businessman sold, in 2007, to the PPF Investment Fund the insurance company Ardaf for 35 million euro. In 2008, Tender sold to the American Oil Services Company Weatherford the Atlas Gip company for 16.8 million euro. In 2009, the businessman sold the Covasna Hotel in Neptun for 1.2 million euro to the businessmen Nicolae and Ion Dusu, from Constanta.

== Africa ==
Starting 2009, Ovidiu Tender turned his attention to the African continent, In Senegal and Gabon the businessman announced that he plans to grow, on large areas of land, Jatropha, a bush tree that can be used for making biodiesel fuel.

"I started a long term agriculture investment program in Senegal and Gambia. In this respect, I leased 30.000 ha of land in Gambia and 100.000 ha of land in Senegal. I will grow Jatropha. By processing this plant, also called the oil tree, you get an oil that is used to make biodiesel fuel. I want this kind of holdings in other countries like Guinea- Bissau or Guinea-Conakry. On a 10 years term, I plan to hold a million ha of agricultural land with this technical plant. I estimate an investment of 400-500 million dollars only for the Jatropha holdings", Ovidiu Tender stated, for cotidianul.ro.

Ovidiu Tender also obtained the leasing of four mine lands: Binia, Bafoundou, Laminia and South M'Bour. The holding contract will run for eight years with the possibility of extinction for 25 years. The holdings include gold, copper, nickel, platinum, zirconium, iron ant other ores. Although he avoided estimate the Africa investment value, Tender says that this value could amount to tens of millions of euro, especially because other fields of activities could be involved. "At this moment, in first phase, is hard to estimate what these investments could mean, in terms of money. For example, right now we study the pharmaceutical market in Senegal, where there are two medicament factories", the businessman stated for the Money Express magazine.

== Personal life ==
Ovidiu Tender is married and has three children.
