= Air Bucharest =

Romanian charter airline

IATA	ICAO	Call sign
—	BUR	AIR BUCHAREST
- Founded: July 2010
- Ceased operations: 24 October 2022
- AOC #: RO-035
- Operating bases: Aurel Vlaicu International Airport
- Fleet size: 1
- Parent company: Kusadasi Travel Agency
- Headquarters: Bucharest, Romania
- Website: www.airbucharest.ro

Air Bucharest, briefly rebranded to New Airlines, was a Romanian charter airline headquartered in Bucharest and based at Aurel Vlaicu International Airport.

== History ==
The airline operated its first flights in 2010, utilizing an aircraft leased from Țiriac Air for charter operations. The airline operated its last flights on 24 October 2022 and then suspended all operations.

In 2023, Fibula Air Travel acquired 50% of the company. It planned to rename it into New Airlines and replace the current planes with newer aircraft. However in February 2024, these plans for a relaunch where shelved. In March 2024, Air Bucharest filed for insolvency.

== Destinations ==
The airline operated charter flights to various destinations in Europe, Africa, and the Middle East, including Hurghada, Egypt, mainly from Henri Coandă International Airport as well as other minor Romanian airports.

== Fleet ==
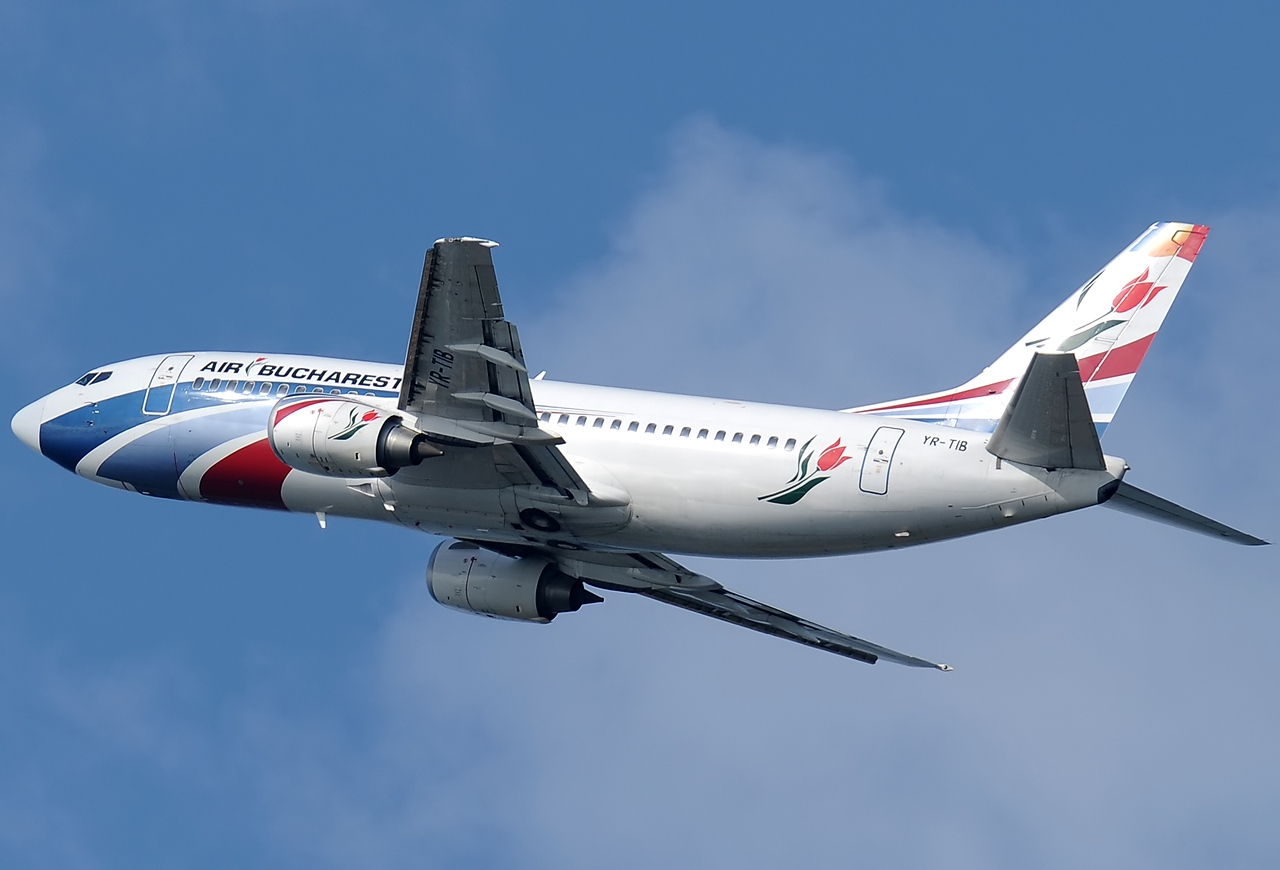
Air Bucharest Boeing 737-300

=== Current fleet ===
Prior to its shutdown, the Air Bucharest fleet comprised the following aircraft:

Aircraft	In fleet	Orders	Passengers	Notes
Boeing 737-300	1	—	144	
Total	1	—		

=== Former fleet ===
The airline fleet previously included the following aircraft types:

- Airbus A320-200
- Boeing 737-400
