= Romavia =

Romanian state airline (1990–2014)

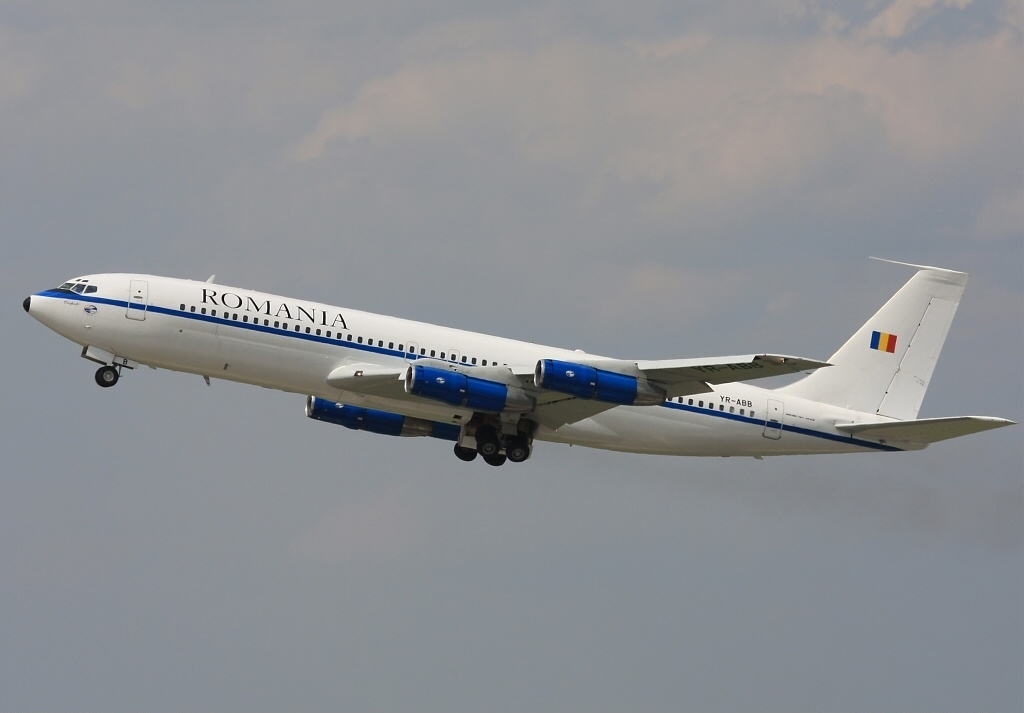
- Romavia Boeing 707-3K1C
IATA	ICAO	Call sign
WQ	RMV	—
- Commenced operations: 1991
- Ceased operations: 2014
- Operating bases: Aurel Vlaicu International Airport
- Headquarters: Bucharest, Romania
- Website: romavia.ro

Compania Română de Aviație Romavia R.A., usually referred to as Romavia and also known as Romanian Aviation Company, was a state airline from Romania, owned and controlled by the Romanian Ministry of National Defence. It operated VIP and charter flights, serving the demands of the Romanian state and its politicians. Romavia had its headquarters in Bucharest, with the base for its flight operations being located at the city's airports Henri Coandă and Băneasa.

== History ==
Romavia was formed by the Romanian government in 1990 and launched flight operations the following year.

Romavia set up an Aircraft Maintenance Organization, for the benefit of their own fleet and for other customers. The fleet consisted, among other models, of two Romanian-built BAC (Rombac) 1-11 (YR-BRE and the last worldwide build, YR-BRI with stage III Rolls-Royce engines).

As of August 2014, the company is bankrupt.

== Fleet ==
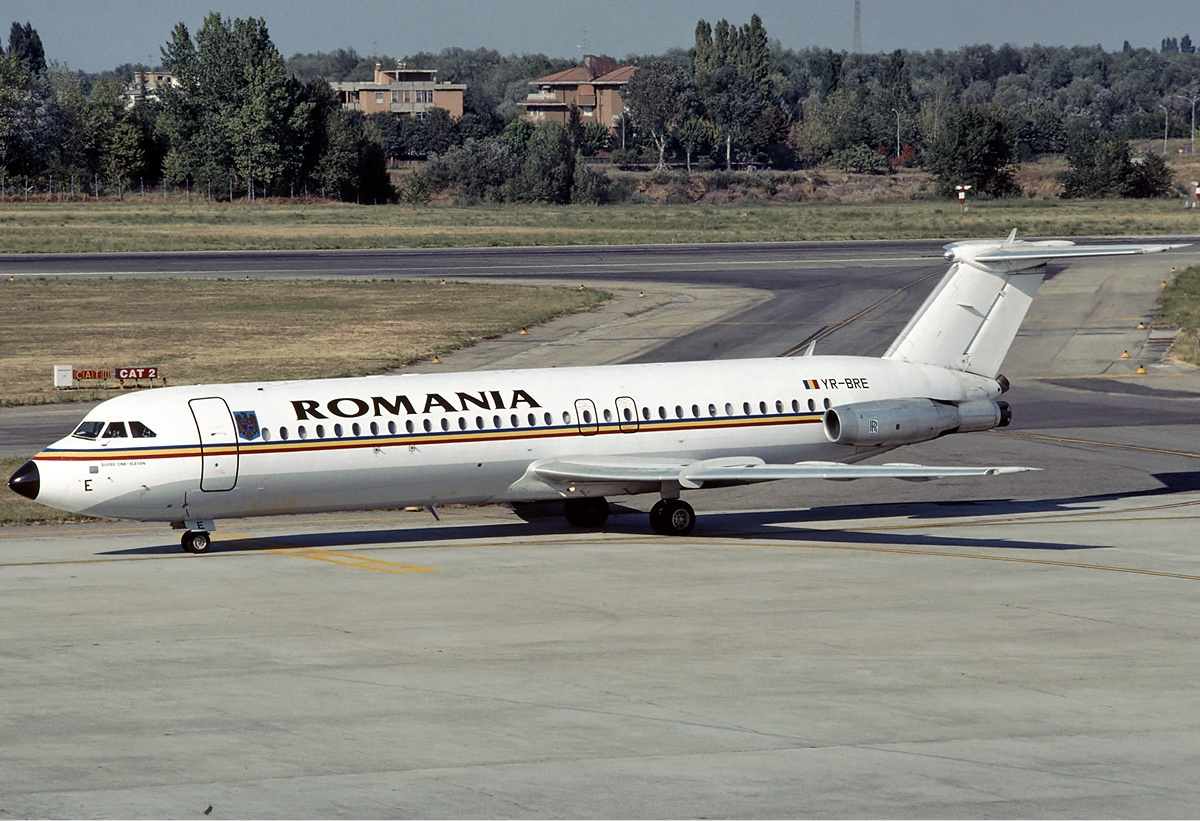
A Romavia Rombac One-Eleven at Bologna Guglielmo Marconi Airport (1998)

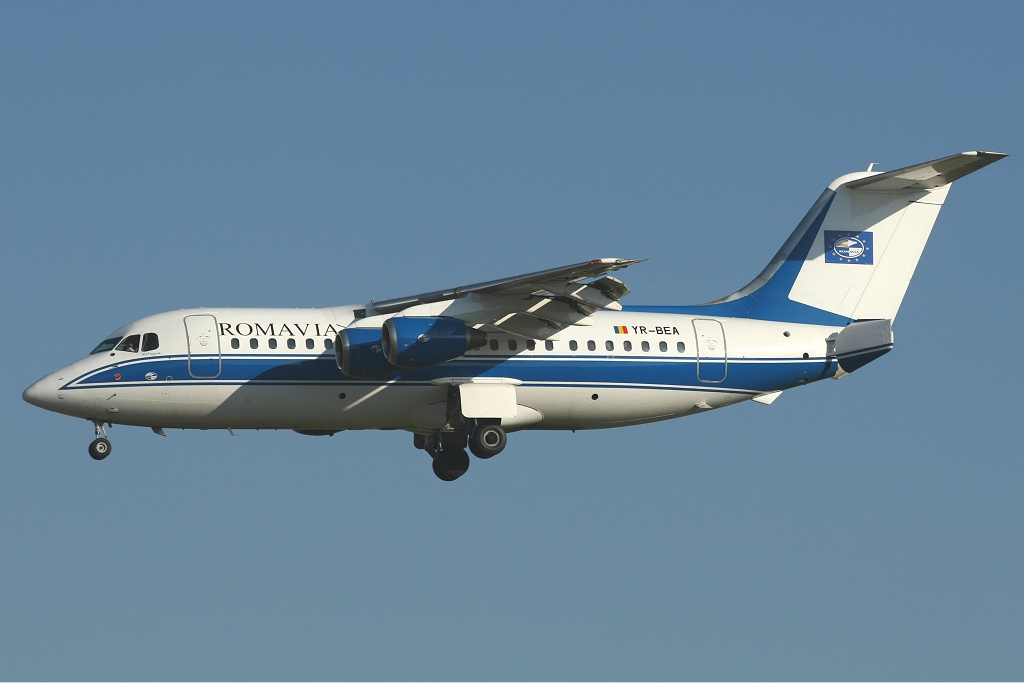
A Romavia BAe 146-200 approaching Brussels Airport (2006)

Over the years, Romavia operated the following aircraft types:

Aircraft	Introduced	Retired	Number
Antonov An-24			4
Antonov An-26			13
Rombac One-Eleven	1995	2009	3
BAe 146-200	2005	2012	3
Boeing 707	1992	2012	1
Ilyushin Il-18			2

== Incidents and accidents ==
- On 10 January 1991, a Boeing 707-300 (registered YR-ABD) was damaged beyond repair during a crash landing at Bucharest Otopeni Airport. The aircraft had been on a crew training flight for soon-to-be-launched Romavia, when it hit the runway with its left wing, resulting in a fire. There were no casualties amongst the 13 persons on board.
- On 13 December 1995, Banat Air Flight 166, an Antonov An-24 (registered YR-AMR) chartered from Romavia, crashed shortly after take-off from Verona Airport, killing all 41 passengers and 8 crew members on board. The accident most probably happened because of the aircraft having been overloaded and improperly de-iced.
