= Ten Airways =

Romanian charter airline

IATA	ICAO	Call sign
X5	OTJ	—
- Founded: 2009
- Ceased operations: 2015
- Hubs: Bucharest Baneasa (BBU)
- Fleet size: 5
- Website: tenairways.com

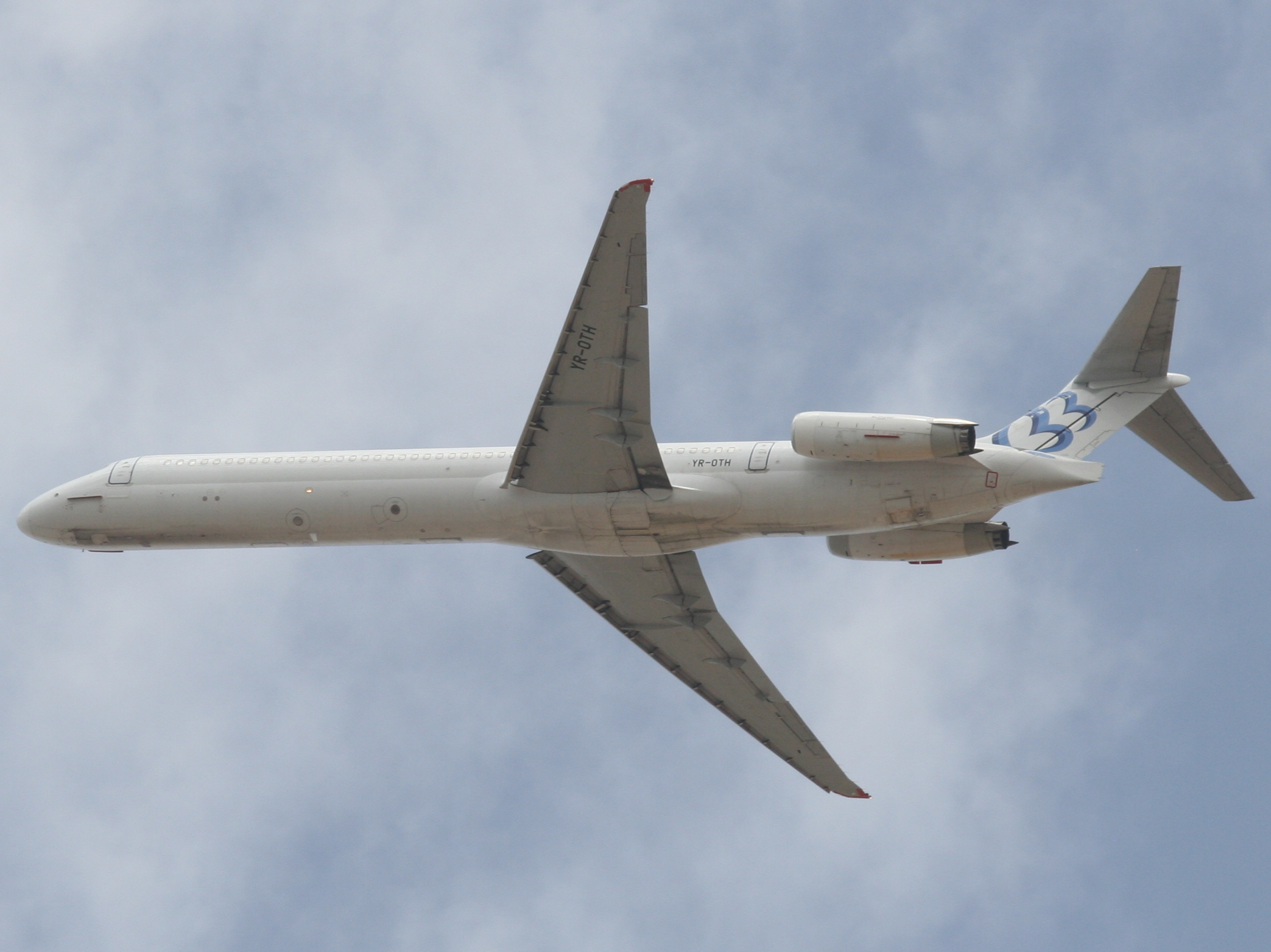
Ten Airways McDonnell Douglas MD-83

Ten Airways was a Romanian charter airline that launched operations in 2009, as a successor of JeTran Air. They operated two MD-82s and three MD-83s The Airline was owned by Ovidiu Tender.

== Fleet ==
The Ten Airways fleet comprised the following aircraft (as of August 2016):

Ten Airways fleet
Aircraft	In service	Orders	Passengers	Notes
McDonnell Douglas MD-82	2	—		
McDonnell Douglas MD-83	3	—		
Total	5			

== See also ==
- Fly Romania
