= DAC Air =

Romanian airline

- Commenced operations: 1995
- Ceased operations: 1998

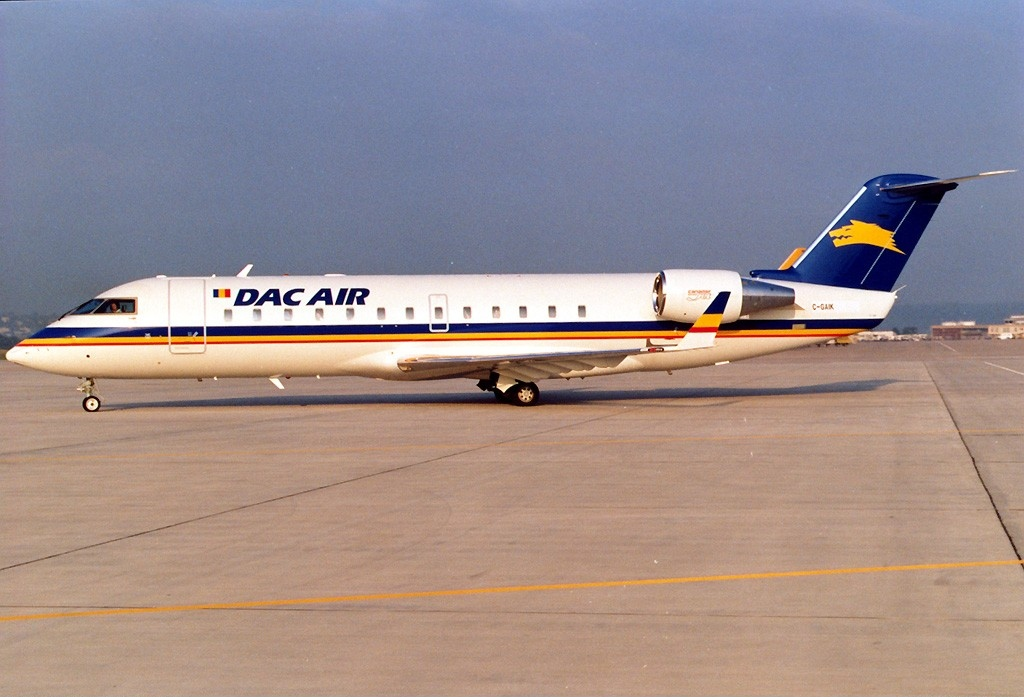
A DAC Air CRJ200 at Stuttgart in 1997

DAC Air was an airline from Romania between 1995 and 1998.
