= Bees Airline =

Ukrainian low-cost airline

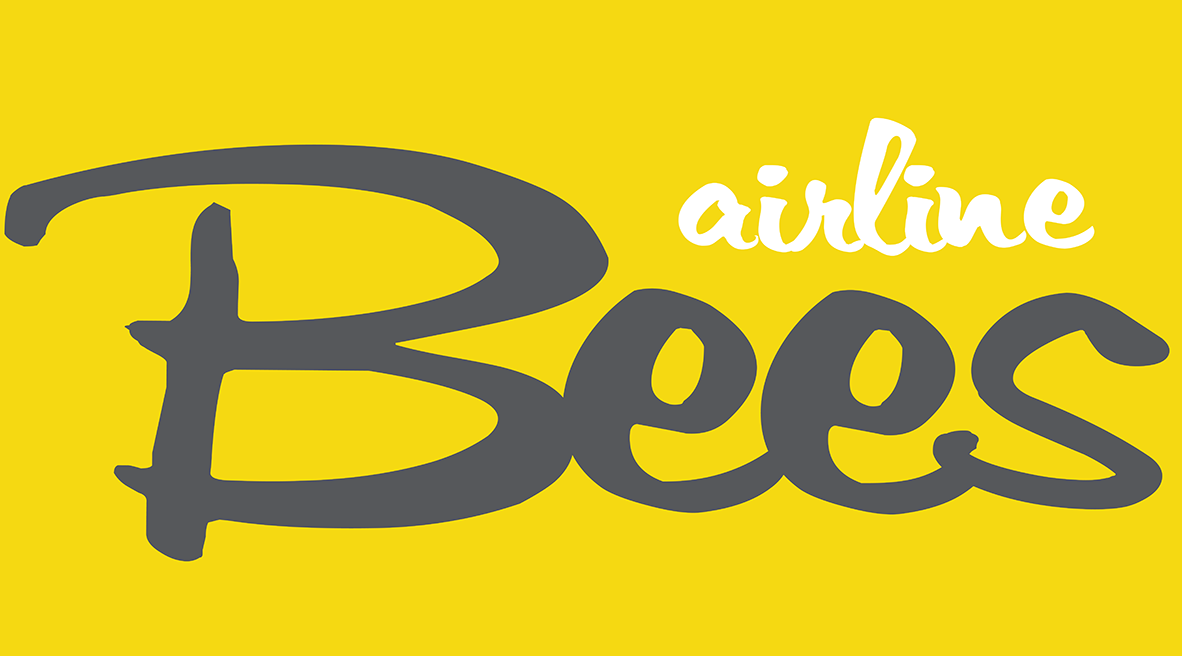
| IATA | ICAO | Call sign |
|---|---|---|
| 7B/BS | UBE/BES | FLOWER BEE/SKY BEES |
- Founded: 2019
- Commenced operations: 18 March 2021
- Ceased operations: 2022
- Operating bases: Kyiv International Airport (Zhuliany)
- Fleet size: 4
- Destinations: 24
- Headquarters: Kyiv, Ukraine, Bucharest, Romania
- Website: bees.aero

Bees Airline was a Ukrainian low-cost airline, which commenced operations in March 2021. Its head office was in Kyiv.

== History ==
The airline was established in late 2019 and received its Air Operator Certificate (AOC) in March 2021. It operated low-cost regular and charter flights from Ukraine to various destinations including Greece, Cyprus, Bulgaria, Egypt, Turkey, Georgia, Armenia, Montenegro, and Spain, utilizing a fleet of four aircraft. Plans were in place to expand the fleet to six aircraft by 2022.

On 29 April 2021, the airline operated its first regular flight: from Kyiv to Yerevan. Due to martial law on the territory of Ukraine and the closure of the airspace of Ukraine, all flights from 24 February 2022 were canceled. The airline's AOC was revoked later in summer 2022 due to the airline not having any aircraft.

In 2024, the Bees brand was revived under a Romanian Aviation Certificate (AOC) based in Bucharest, Romania. At the moment, the Ukrainian branch of the Bees brand is suspended until the end of the military conflict in the country and the re-opening of Ukrainian airspace. Bees announced it would launch several scheduled routes from Bucharest, Suceava and Chișinău to destinations in Greece, Italy, Germany and Israel in the summer of 2024, using the Airbus A320 YR-BUZ, unlike the previous business model which relied exclusively on the B737-800.

On 25 June 2026, the Kyiv Commercial Court opened proceedings in the bankruptcy case of the Airline.

== Destinations ==
Bees Airline operated scheduled and charter international and domestic flights to the following destinations:

- Armenia: Yerevan
- Azerbaijan: Ganja
- Bulgaria: Varna, Burgas
- Cyprus: Larnaca
- Czech Republic: Prague
- Egypt: Sharm el-Sheikh, Hurghada, Marsa-Alam (charter)
- Georgia: Tbilisi, Batumi
- Greece: Patras, Heraklion, Rhodes
- Montenegro: Tivat (charter)
- Spain: Alicante, Barcelona
- Turkey: Antalya (charter)
- Ukraine: Kharkiv, Kherson, Kyiv-Zhuliany, Lviv, Odesa
- Uzbekistan: Samarkand
- Germany: Baden-Baden

== Fleet ==
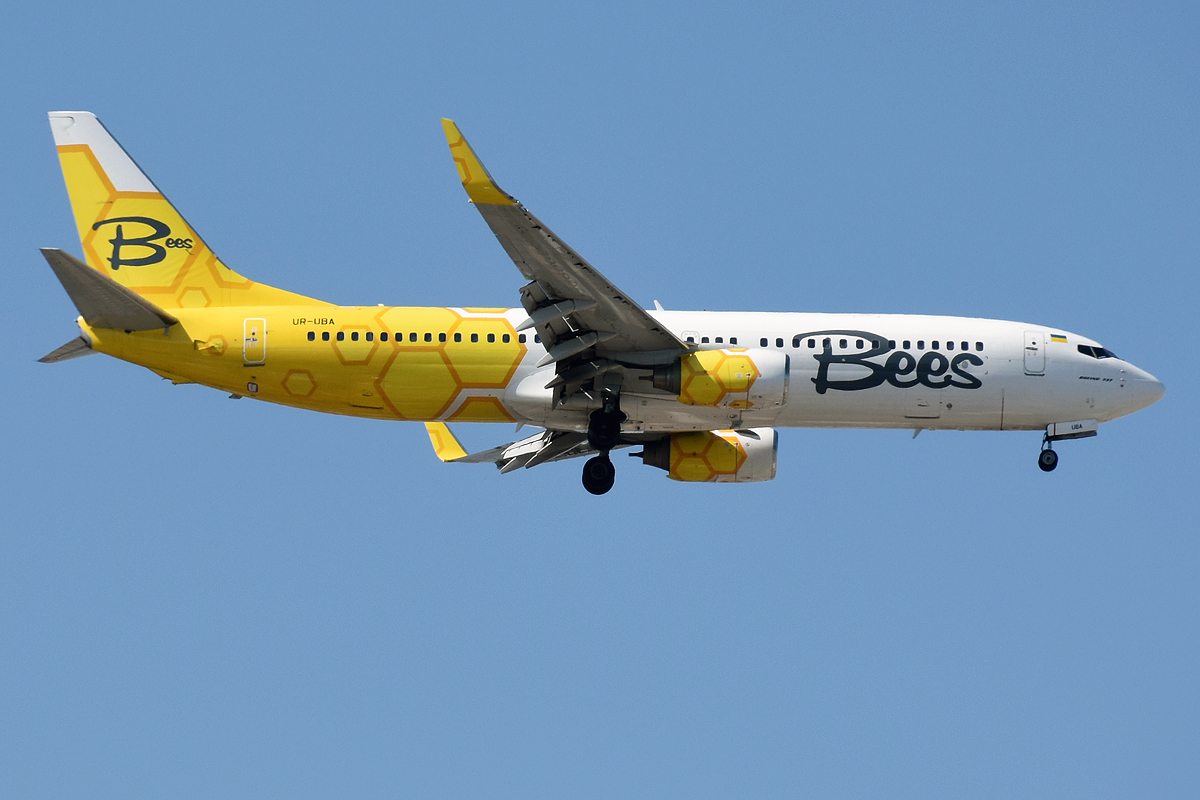
Bees Airline Boeing 737-800

As of August 2024, Bees Airline operated the following aircraft:

Bees Airline fleet
| Aircraft | In service | Orders | Passengers | Notes |
|---|---|---|---|---|
| Airbus A320 | 2 | | 189 | |
| Total | 4 | 2 | | |

== See also ==
- List of airlines of Ukraine
