= LAR Romanian Airlines =

Romanian airline (1975–1997)

LAR - Romanian Air Lines LAR - Liniile Aeriene Române
IATA	ICAO	Call sign
QR	RLA	—
- Founded: 1975
- Ceased operations: 1997
- Headquarters: Otopeni, Romania

LAR (Romanian: Liniile Aeriene Române; Romanian Air Lines) was the second national airline in Romania, re-created primarily as a charter flights and inclusive tour airline, apart from the Romanian national airline, TAROM. Its predecessor was the LAR (Liniile Aeriene Române) incorporated in 1924.

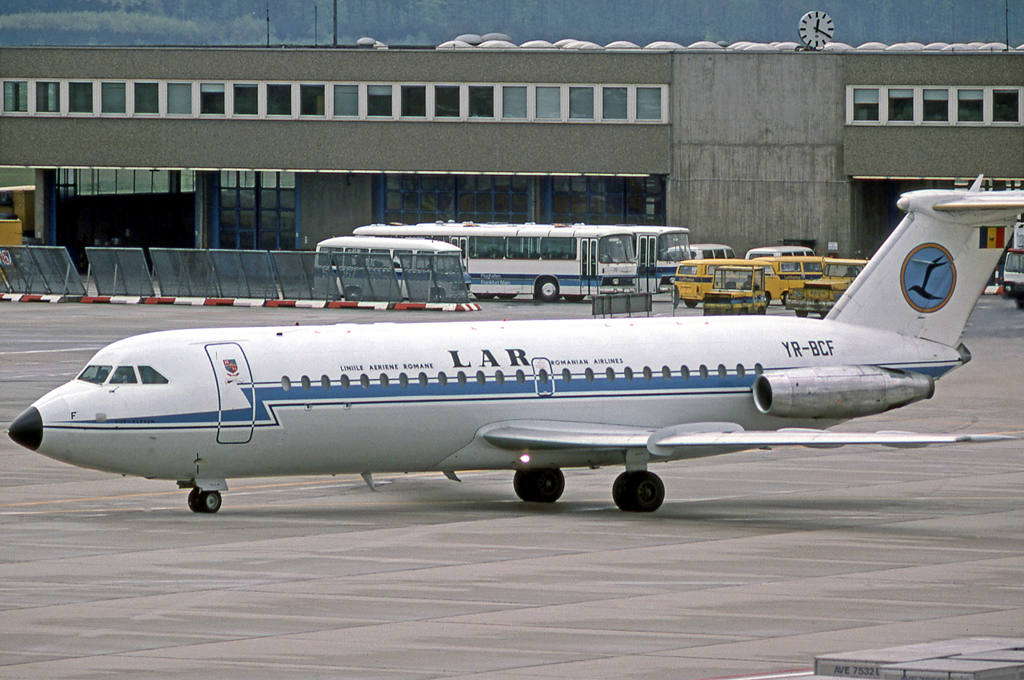
BAC 1-11 of LAR departing from Frankfurt International Airport in 1977

The company operated between 1975 and 1997 and employed a fleet of BAC One-Elevens. The airline's flights mainly carried holiday makers to and from Romanian resorts from airports located throughout Europe.
