= JeTran Air =

Romanian airline

IATA	ICAO	Call sign
—	MDJ	AIR ROMANIA
- Founded: 2005
- Ceased operations: 2009
- Hubs: Henri Coandă International Airport
- Secondary hubs: Oradea International Airport
- Fleet size: 8
- Destinations: charter
- Headquarters: Coralilor St. 23, District 1 Bucharest 013328 Romania

SC Jetran Air SRL was a charter airline with its head office in Sector 1, Bucharest, Romania. Its main hub was at Henri Coandă International Airport in Bucharest.

== History ==
JeTran Air as an airline was established in 2005, through a merger with the already existing company Jetran Asset Management, whose crews had been operating and maintaining MD80 Aircraft since 2003. In 2008, Jetran Air flew approximately 7,000 flight hours all over Europe and North Africa for various airline operators on Wet-Lease (ACMI) agreements. It operated scheduled passenger services to a small number of holiday destinations throughout Europe, Wet lease services to other airlines under ACMI contracts and Dry lease contracts.The airline was owned by Ovidiu Tender.

== Destinations ==
Jetran Air was operating charter flights out of Henri Coandă International Airport, Oradea International Airport.

== Fleet ==
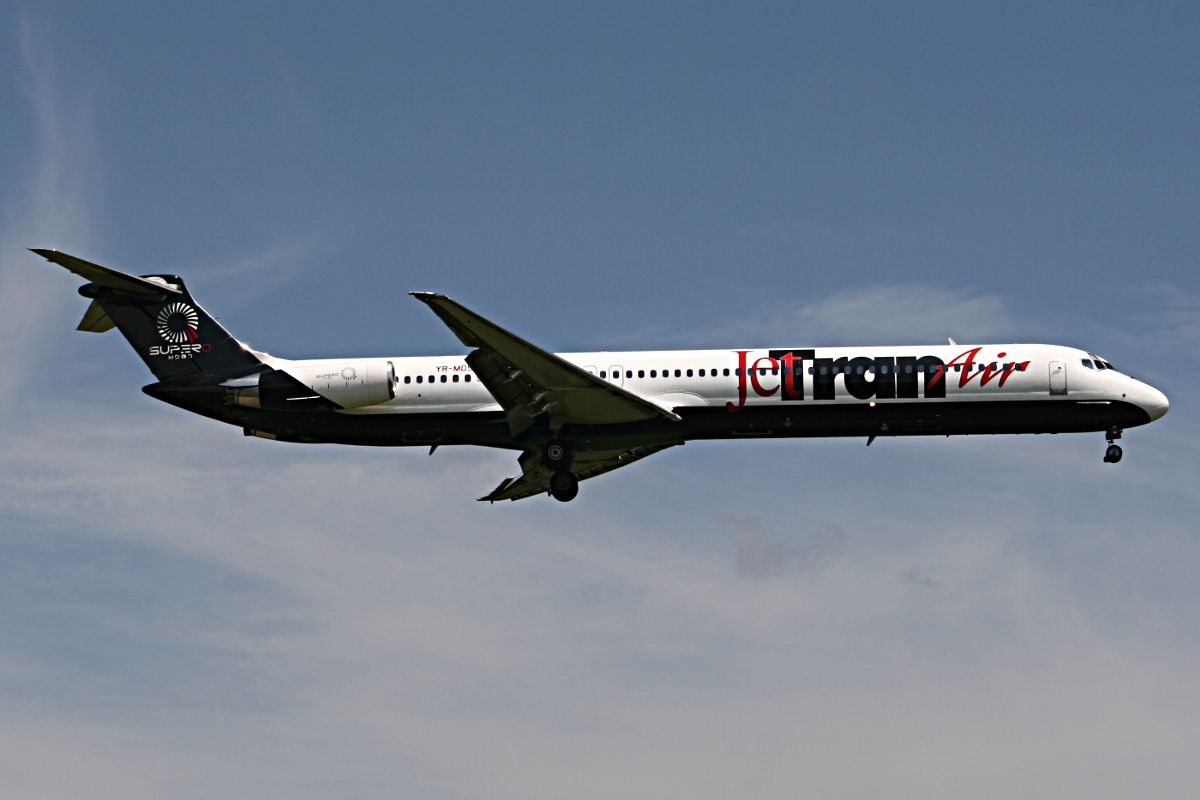
JeTran Air MD-82

The JeTran Air fleet consisted of the following registered aircraft (as of April 2019):

JeTran Air fleet
Aircraft	In service	Orders	Passengers
McDonnell Douglas MD-83	8	0	172
Total	8	0	
