= Țiriac Air =

Romanian charter airline

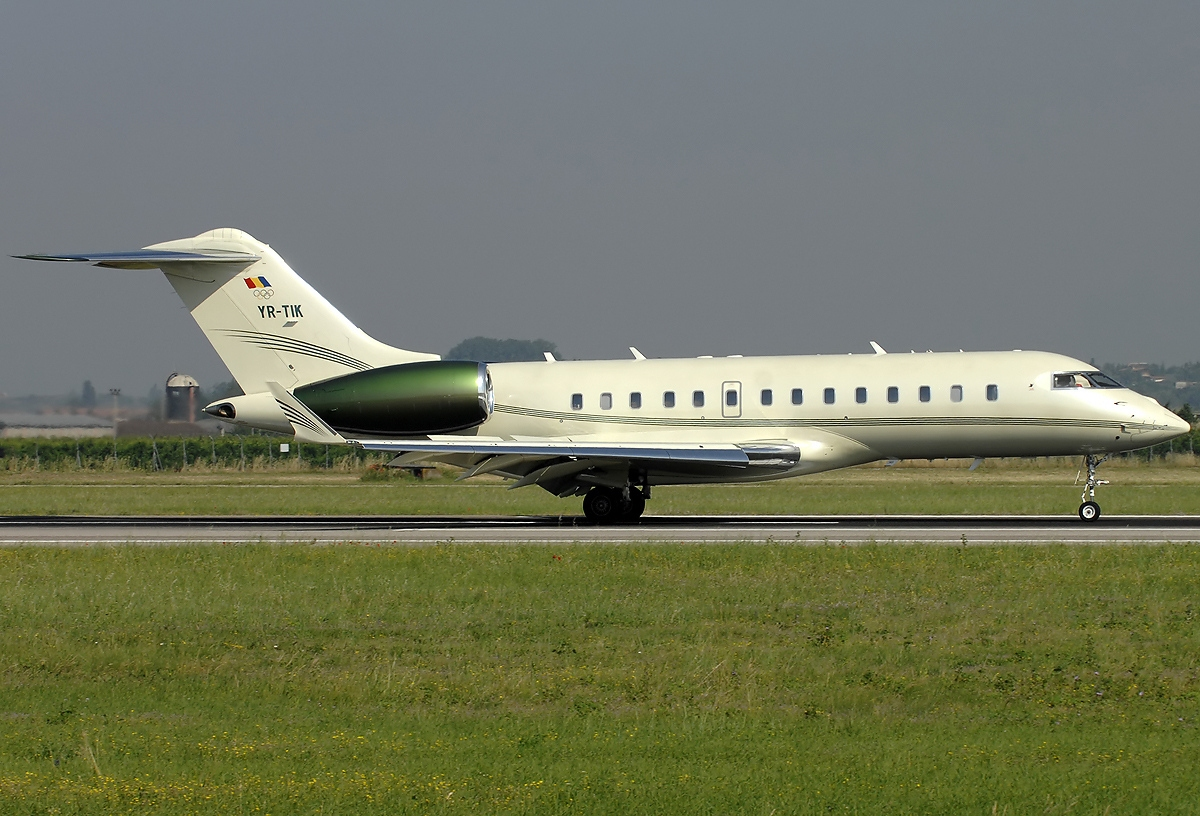
- Țiriac Air Bombardier Global 5000
IATA	ICAO	Call sign
—	TIH	TIRIAC AIR
- Founded: 1997
- AOC #: RO-005
- Operating bases: Henri Coandă International Airport
- Fleet size: 5
- Headquarters: Otopeni, Romania
- Website: tiriacair.ro

Țiriac Air (SC Ion Țiriac Air SRL) is a Romanian corporate charter airline with its head office at Henri Coandă International Airport near Bucharest, operating from Henri Coandă International Airport.

== History ==
Țiriac Air was founded in 1997, as part of Țiriac Group. The airline operates a helicopter and business jets, and is the sole Romanian operator to own a private VIP Terminal and hangar capability. Tiriac Air operates as a maintenance base for Agusta helicopters under EASA Part 145 certification.

== Fleet ==
As of March 2024, the Țiriac Air fleet consists of the following aircraft:

- 1 AgustaWestland AW139
- 1 Bombardier Global 5000
- 2 Embraer Phenom 300E
- 1 Gulfstream G200
- 1 Cessna 208B Grand Caravan EX
