= Romanian Civil Aeronautical Authority =

Civil aviation authority of Romania

The Romanian Civil Aeronautical Authority (RCAA, Romanian: Autoritatea Aeronautică Civilă Română, AACR) is the civil aviation authority of Romania. Its head office is in Bucharest.
