= FC 2000 Ghimbav Stadium =

Stadium in Romania

Stadionul FC 2000 Ghimbav
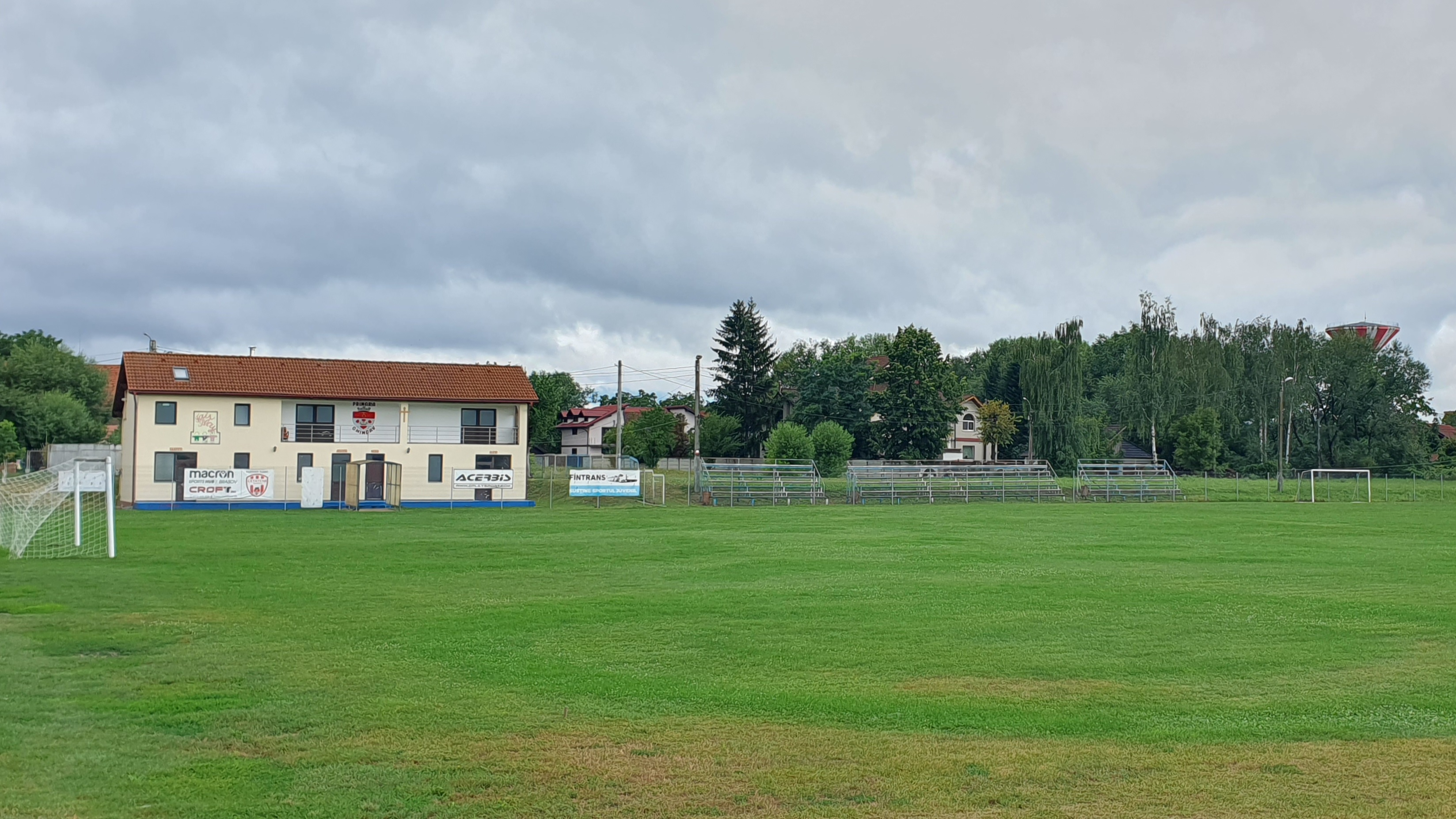
- Interactive map of Stadionul FC 2000 Ghimbav
- Former names: Royal
- Address: Str. Făgărașului
- Location: Ghimbav, Romania
- Coordinates: 45°39′55.8″N 25°30′39.1″E
- Owner: Town of Ghimbav
- Operator: Teutonii Ghimbav
- Capacity: 700
- Surface: Grass

Construction
- Opened: 2000

Tenant
- Teutonii Ghimbav (2000–present)

Stadionul FC 2000 Ghimbav is a multi-purpose stadium in Ghimbav, Romania. It is currently used mostly for football matches, has a capacity of 700 people and is the home ground of the local team, Teutonii Ghimbav.
