= Dan Air (Romania) =

Airline based in Romania

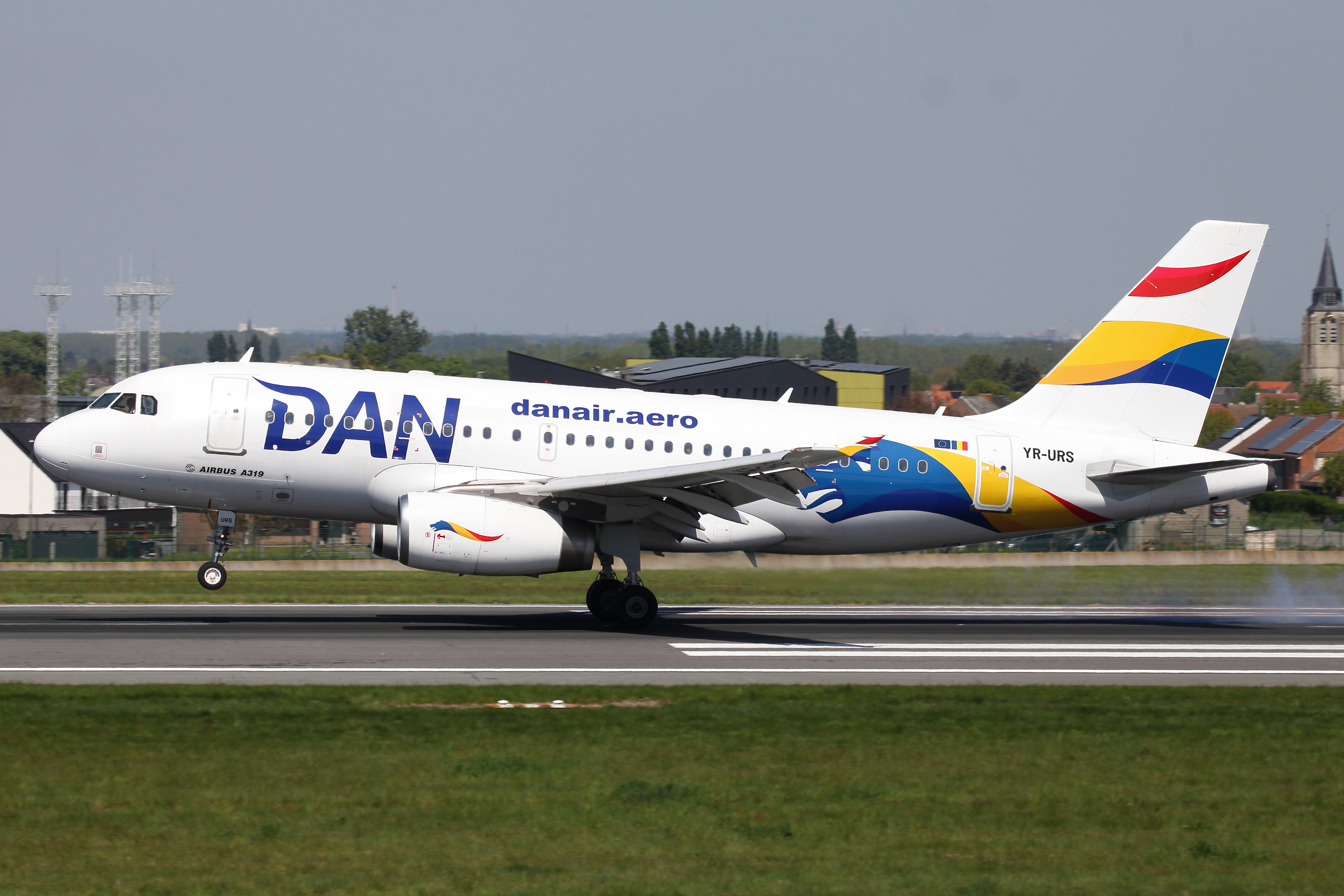
- Dan Air Airbus A319
IATA	ICAO	Call sign
DN	DNA	DAN AIR
- Founded: 2017
- Commenced operations: 2018
- AOC #: RO-064
- Hubs: Bacău; Bucharest–Otopeni
- Fleet size: 3
- Destinations: 16
- Headquarters: Bucharest, Romania
- Key people: Matt Ian David (CEO)
- Founder: Matt Ian David
- Revenue: ▲€20.25 million (2023)
- Net income: ▲€0.43 million (2023)
- Website: danair.ro

Dan Air, formerly named Just Us Air, is a Romanian airline headquartered in Bucharest. It started regular passenger flight operations under its own brand in June 2023, after previously operating charter flights and wet lease flights with its own aircraft for various other airlines since its foundation at the end of 2017.

== History ==
The airline commenced operations in early 2018 under the name Just Us Air, and it rebranded to its current name in late 2021.

The company began regular passenger flights under its own brand in June 2023, from the Henri Coandă International Airport in Bucharest, Romania, and from the new airport in Brașov, Romania. It currently flies only to destinations in Western Europe, but from November 2023, it is set to also fly to Israel and the United Arab Emirates.

Flights from the Bucharest–Otopeni airport were merged with the ones from the Brașov airport heading for and arriving from the same destinations, due to the latter one's operating schedule only between 07:00 and 19:00.

The company stopped operating flights from the Bucharest–Otopeni since July 2023 and during the second half of the year, increasing focus on the Brașov airport instead. In December 2023, the company moved all of their flights to the George Enescu International Airport in Bacău, where they opened a completely new selection of routes to ten destinations across Europe.

In July 2024, the Romanian Civil Aeronautical Authority (RCAA) had repeatedly delayed the registration of Dan Air's 2nd aircraft (YR-RAM), causing daily financial losses. As of October 2024, Dan Air's 3rd Airbus A320 (YR-JUL) was still being used by Romanian low-cost carrier Animawings, after being leased from Dan Air in April 2024.

On 15 June 2025, Dan Air became the first European airline to restart regular flights to Syria on the Bucharest–Damascus route. The airline previously announced the decision to start regular flights to Syria in May 2025. In September 2025, the airline was to restart flights to Aleppo, however the inauguration of the route was delayed to 14 December after operational considerations. It carried 235 thousand passengers in 2025.

In November 2026, Dan Air suspended operations due to entering insolvency proceedings.

== Destinations ==
As of June 2025, Dan Air operates scheduled flights to the destinations shown below:

Country	City	Airport	Notes	References
Armenia	Yerevan	Zvartnots International Airport		
Cyprus	Larnaca	Larnaca International Airport		
Belgium	Brussels	Brussels Airport		
France	Paris	Beauvais–Tillé Airport		
Georgia	Tbilisi	Shota Rustaveli Tbilisi International Airport		
Germany	Dortmund	Dortmund Airport		
Ireland	Dublin	Dublin Airport		
Italy	Bergamo	Orio al Serio International Airport		
Italy	Bologna	Bologna Guglielmo Marconi Airport		
Italy	Rome	Leonardo da Vinci–Fiumicino Airport		
Italy	Turin	Turin Airport		
Jordan	Amman	Queen Alia International Airport		
Romania	Bacău	George Enescu International Airport	Hub	
Romania	Brașov	Brașov-Ghimbav International Airport	Terminated	
Romania	Bucharest	Bucharest Henri Coandă International Airport	Hub	
Spain	Barcelona	Josep Tarradellas Barcelona–El Prat Airport		
Spain	Madrid	Madrid–Barajas Airport		
Spain	Valencia	Valencia Airport		
Syria	Aleppo	Aleppo International Airport		
Syria	Damascus	Damascus International Airport		
United Kingdom	Liverpool	Liverpool John Lennon Airport	Terminated	
United Kingdom	London	Gatwick Airport	Terminated	
United Kingdom	London	London Luton Airport		

=== Interline agreements ===
- APG Airlines

== Fleet ==
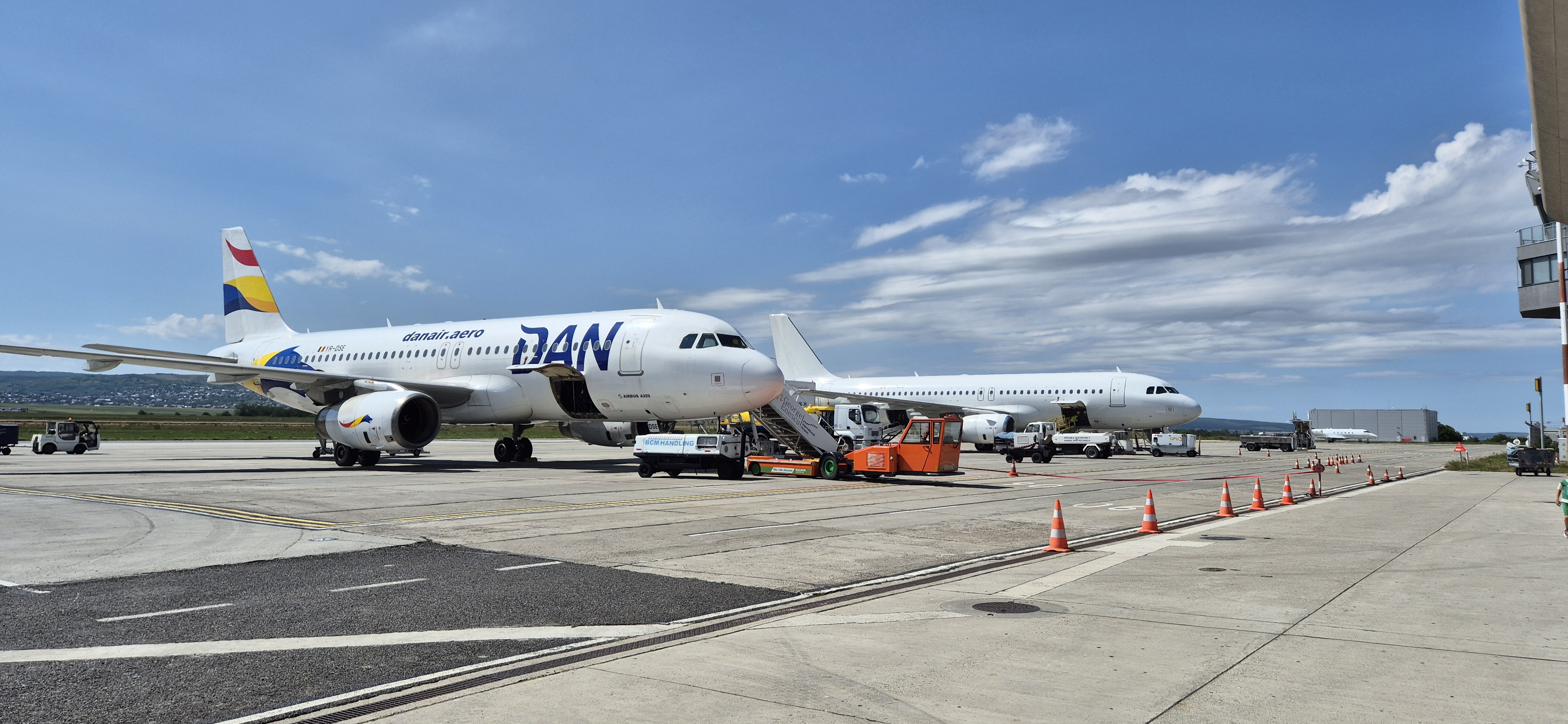
Two Dan Air Airbus A320-200s

=== Current fleet ===
As of August 2025, Dan Air operates the following aircraft:

Dan Air fleet
Aircraft	In service	Orders	Passengers	Notes
Airbus A319-100	1	—	144	
Airbus A320-200	2	—	180	
Total	3	—		

=== Historic fleet ===
In the past, the company also operated the following aircraft types:

- Airbus A321-200
