= George Enescu International Airport =

Airport in Bacău, Romania

George Enescu International Airport Aeroportul Internaţional George Enescu
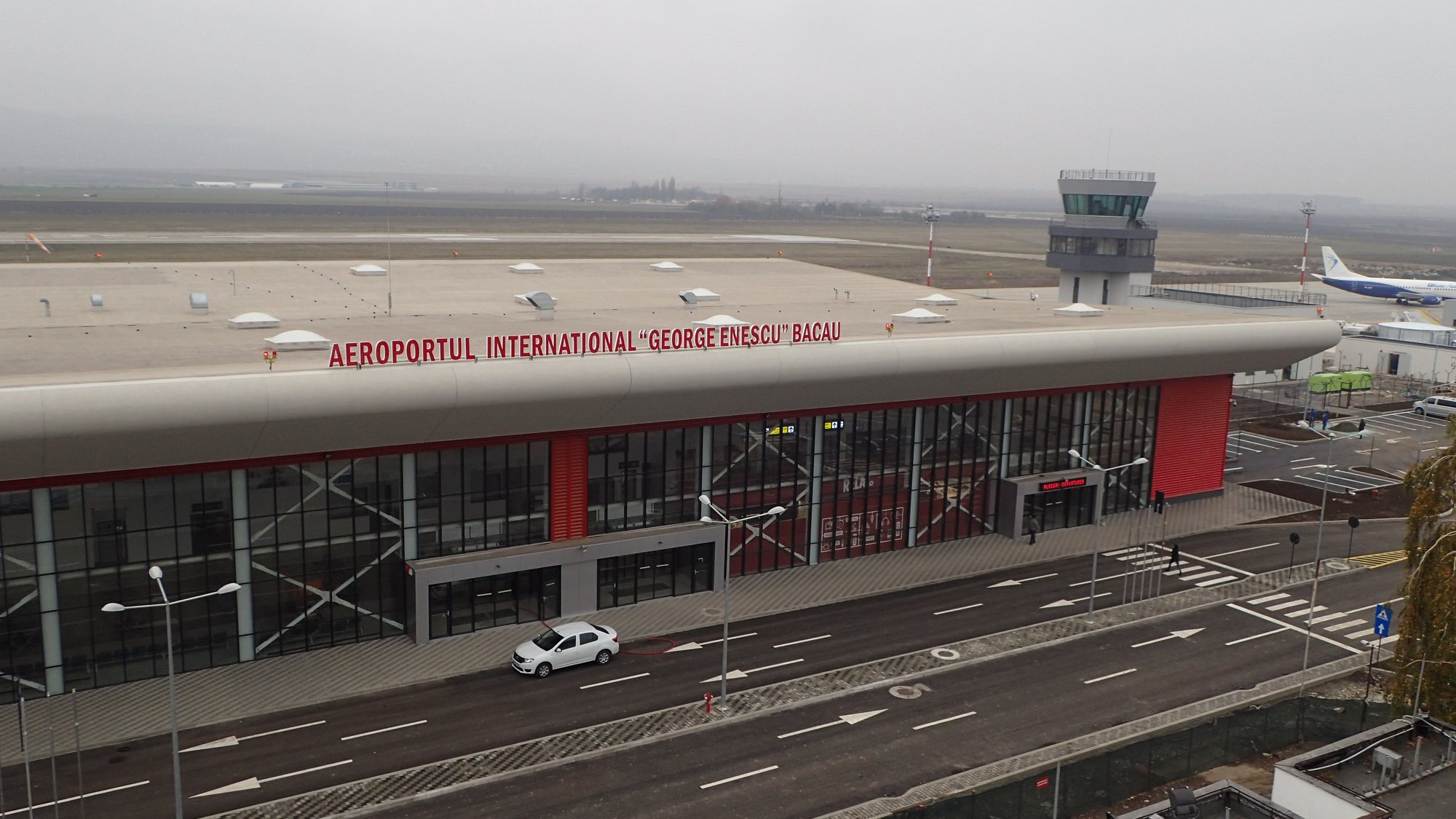
- IATA: BCM; ICAO: LRBC

Summary
- Airport type: Public / Military
- Operator: Bacău County Council, Bacău Local Council
- Serves: Bacău, Romania
- Opened: 1946
- Hub for: Dan Air
- Elevation AMSL: 607 ft (185 m)
- Coordinates: 46°31′19″N 026°54′37″E
- Website: www.bacauairport.ro

Map
- Location of airport in Romania

Runways
Direction	Length		Surface
Direction	m	ft	Surface
16/34	2,500	8,203	Asphalt

Statistics (2025)
- Passengers: 451,036 ▼
- Aircraft movements: 4,016 ▼
- Source: AIP at the Romanian Airports Association (RAA)

George Enescu International Airport (IATA: BCM, ICAO: LRBC) is an airport located in Bacău, Romania. Named after the Romanian composer George Enescu the airport shares its runway with RoAF 95th Air Base, and Aerostar, a major Romanian aerospace and defence company. The airport is located 5 km (3.1 mi) south of the city centre of Bacău.

== History ==
=== Foundation and early years ===
Bacău Airport opened for passenger service in 1946. A modern terminal building with a control tower began construction in 1970, and was completed in 1971. In 1975, it received international status.

=== Development since the 2000s ===
A 2005 renovation/expansion remodeled the terminal building. In 2018, a new terminal was opened and the old one demolished.

In 2009, Bacău Airport became the first Romanian airport to be privately administered by a nongovernmental company. BlueAero, its administrator, was 100% owned by the fully private airline Blue Air. The new company that took over the airport is nowadays the main operator. Other airlines that operated here were TAROM, which withdraw its flights, and Carpatair, which canceled all its scheduled flights. When Blue Air was sold because its parent company's holding went into bankruptcy, the airport was returned to the local government administration. The modernization promised in the takeover contract was completed to a less than 10% status due to financial problems in the holding. Since June 2021, TAROM had been operating flights from the airport again, starting with the charter flight to Antalya, Turkey, with direct flights to several major Romanian cities planned to be introduced at a later date.

In February 2014, the new owners, a 50-50 joint venture between the city and county public administrations, started a new modernization program. The project involved the construction of a passenger terminal, a control tower, a parking area, and an intermodal bus terminal, as well as the refurbishment of the runway. In November 2017, the new passenger terminal, with a processing capacity of 450 pax/hour and four boarding gates, was inaugurated.

== Military usage ==
The airport is home to the Romanian Air Force 95th Air Base, home of the 951st Advanced Air Training Squadron, operating the IAR 99 Șoim, and of the 952nd Helicopter Squadron, operating IAR 330L and IAR 330 SOCAT.

== Airlines and destinations ==
The following airlines operate regular scheduled and charter flights at Bacău Airport:

Airlines	Destinations
Dan Air	Bergamo, Brussels, Dublin, London–Luton, Turin; Seasonal: Beauvais, Bologna, Barcelona, Larnaca, Madrid, Treviso, Valencia (all flights suspended)
Wizz Air	London–Luton, Rome–Fiumicino

== Statistics ==
=== Traffic figures ===
Year	Passengers	Change
2003	21,020	▲66.2%
2004	27,574	▲31.2%
2005	36,261	▲31.5%
2006	40,601	▲12%
2007	112,854	▲178%
2008	116,492	▲3.2%
2009	195,772	▲68%
2010	240,735	▲23%
2011	336,961	▲40%
2012	393,352	▲16.7%
2013	307,488	▼21.8%
2014	313,376	▲1.9%
2015	364,492	▲16.3%
2016	414,676	▲13.8%
2017	425,733	▲2.7%
2018	447,531	▲5.1%
2019	468,455	▲4.7%
2020	123,019	▼73.7%
2021	379,947	▲208.8%
2022	556,327	▲46.4%
2023	249,802	▼55.1%
2024	559,644	▲124.0%
2025	451,036	▼19.4%

== See also ==
- Aviation in Romania
- Transport in Romania
