= RoAF 93rd Air Base =

- Baza 93 Aeriană
- Part of RoAF 71st Air Base
- Giarmata, Timiș County, Romania
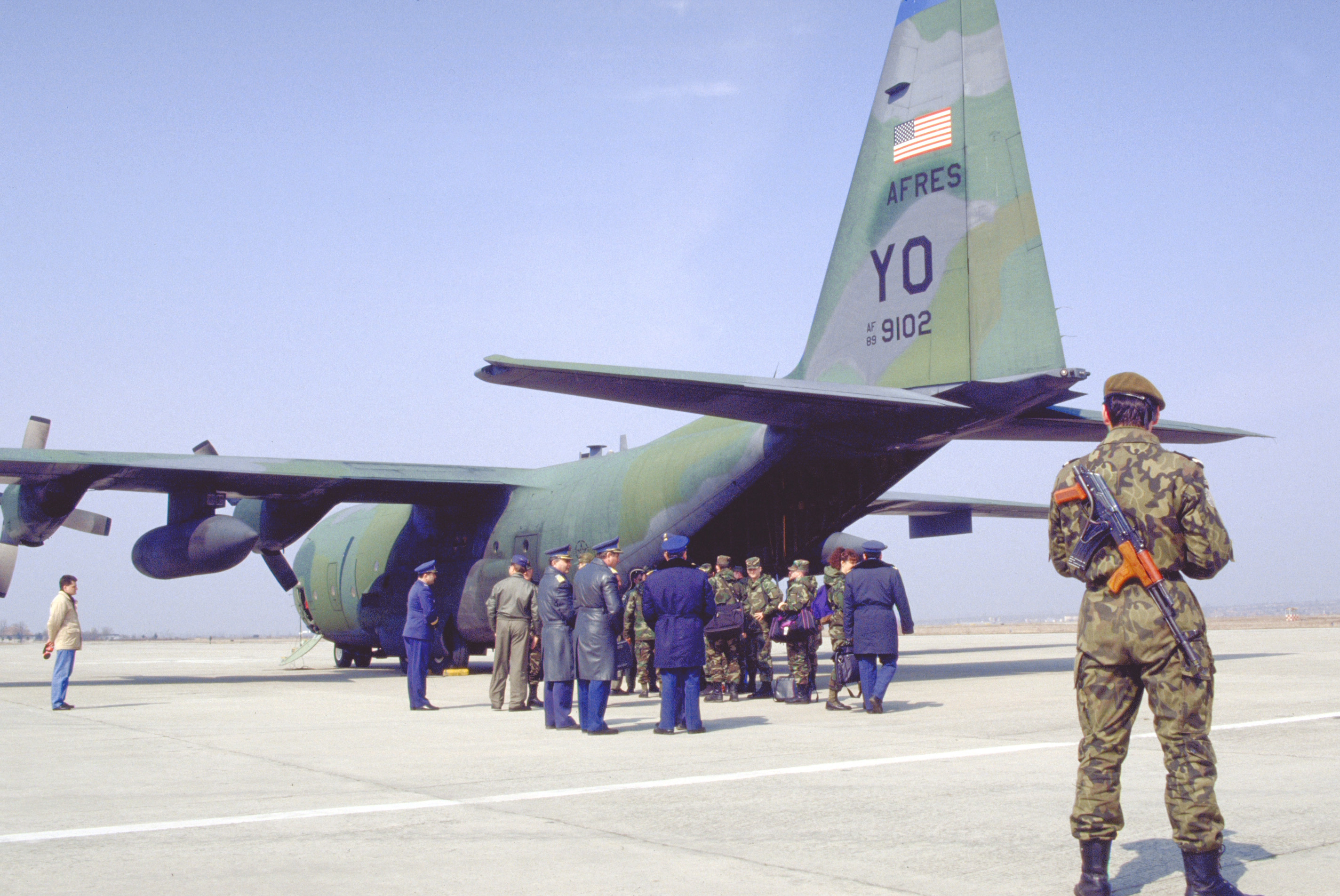
- A C-130 Hercules of the US Air Force Reserve at the airbase in 1996

Site information
- Controlled by: Romanian Air Force

Location
- Coordinates: 45°48′36″N 21°20′2.39″E

Site history
- Built: 1953
- In use: 1953–2004; 2004–present (annex to the 71st Air Base)

Garrison information
- Occupants: 712th Helicopter Squadron; Romanian Land Forces: Bayraktar Company

Airfield information
- Identifiers: IATA: TSR, ICAO: LRTR
- Elevation: 106 metres (348 ft) AMSL
Runways
Direction	Length and surface
11/29	3,500 metres (11,483 ft) Asphalt

The Romanian Air Force 93rd Air Base (Romanian: Baza 93 Aeriană), also known as Giarmata Air Base, was an air base located in the commune Giarmata, near Timișoara, at the Traian Vuia International Airport. The base was disbanded in August 2004 due to the Romanian Armed Forces reorganisation program and the retirement of the MiG-23s which were based here.

The military sector of the Traian Vuia International Airport is currently an annex of the 71st Air Base hosting the 712th Helicopter Squadron (operating IAR-330M). The base also hosts Bayraktar TB2 drones of the Romanian Land Forces operated by the 184th Sensors and Anti-aircraft Defense Battalion.

== History ==
=== Cold War ===
The base was established in 1953 as the 93rd Aviation Regiment (Regimentul 93 Aviație), following the transfer of an existing unit from Ianca. At that time, the regiment was equipped with Po-2, Yak-11 and Yak-17 aircraft. Following this transfer, the base was overhauled and from 1954 Yak-23 fighters began their missions at the base.

In 1955, the first MiG-15s entered service with the regiment, and in 1959 the regiment changed its name to the 93rd Fighter Aviation Regiment. In 1962, the regiment received MiG-21F-13 fighters. These were brought by Soviet pilots from the Deveselu Air Base (at that time the 91st Fighter Aviation Regiment). Pilots were transferred from Craiova and Deveselu air bases to operate the new jets. Starting in 1968, the regiment began taking part in escort missions for presidential planes.

In 1972, the 31st Reconnaissance Squadron (Escadrila 31 Aviație Cercetare), independent from the 91st Regiment and equipped with MiG-21R aircraft was established. The first MiG-23 fighters arrived at the base in 1979.

=== Post-1990 ===
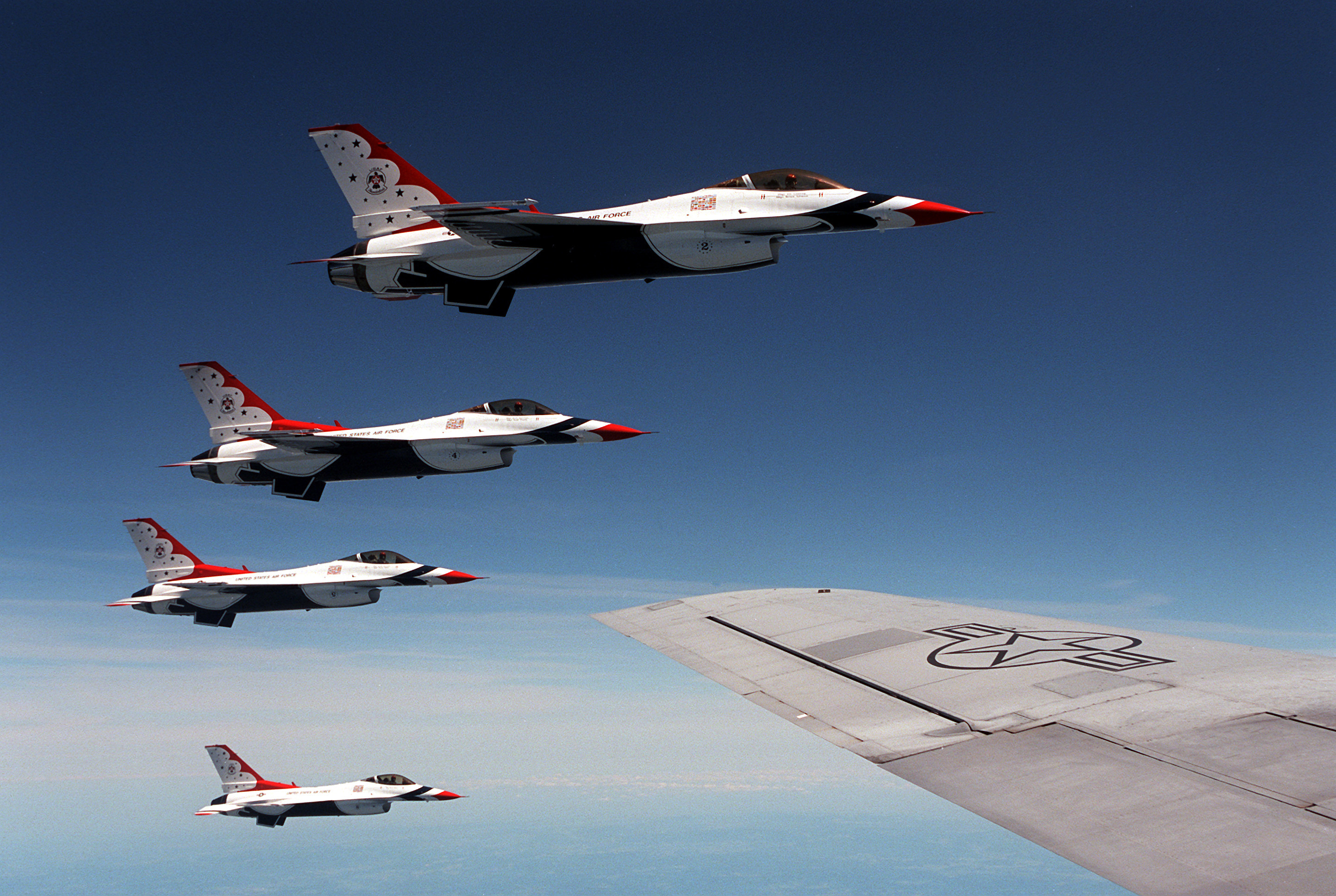
US Air Force Thunderbirds on their way to Timișoara in 1996

By 1992, the 93rd Regiment had two squadrons equipped with MiG-23 and one with MiG-21. In 1995, the regiment was transformed into the 93rd Air Base following the restructuring of the Air Force and the abandoning of the communist-era regimental system. The 31st Squadron was disbanded in 1998, while in 1999, the first MiG-21 LanceRs arrived at the base. In 1996, the base hosted the USAF Thunderbirds, Giarmata being the start location for their 30-day European tour. In 2000, it hosted the largest air show of western Romania on the 90th anniversary of Aurel Vlaicu's first flight with the A Vlaicu I.

Following the disbanding of the 73rd Helicopter Group from Caransebeș, its helicopters were moved to Giarmata. After the MiG-23s were retired, the 93rd Air Base was disbanded on 31 August 2004 with the official ceremony taking place in September. The remaining MiG-21s from the base were redistributed to other bases. Currently, the base retains the AN/FPS-117 radar system, and is also an annex of the 71st Air Base, hosting the 712th Helicopter Squadron.

The base also housed the Romanian Shadow 600 drones operated by the 142nd Unmanned Aircraft Squadron. In 2003, the drones were reassigned to the General Directorate for Defense Intelligence and by 2019 the number of drones still in service was uncertain.

On 23 April 2023, it was announced that the Bayraktar TB2 drones purchased for the Romanian Land Forces were to be delivered to the 93rd Air Base. Bayraktar TB2 drones are operated by the Bayraktar Company of the 184th Sensors and Anti-aircraft Defense Battalion.

== Based units ==
The following units operate from the Giarmata base.

=== Romanian Air Force ===
Air Force General Staff

- 71st Air Base
  - 712th Helicopter Squadron

=== Romanian Land Forces ===
Land Forces Command

- 18th Intelligence Surveillance Reconnaissance Brigade "Decebal"
  - 184th Sensors and Anti-aircraft Defense Battalion "Timiș"
    - Bayraktar Company
