= RoAF 95th Air Base =

RoAF 95th Air Base
- Baza 95 Aeriană "Căpitan Aviator Alexandru Șerbănescu"
- Bacău, Bacău County in Romania
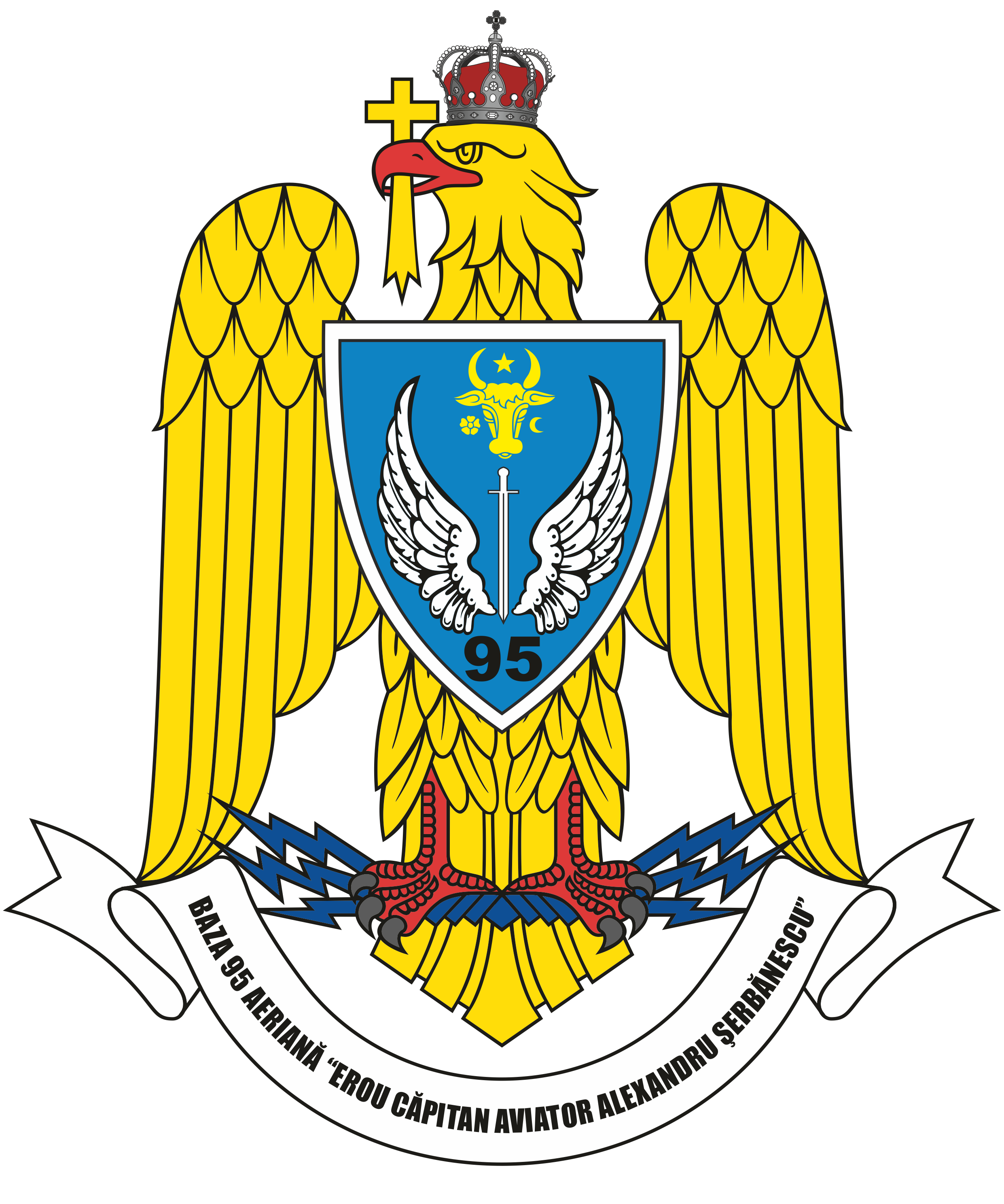
- Coat of arms of the 95th Air Base

Site information
- Owner: Ministry of National Defence
- Operator: Romanian Air Force

Location
- Location within Romania Location within Europe
- Coordinates: 46°31′18″N 26°54′37″E

Site history
- Built: 1968
- In use: 1968–Present

Garrison information
- Current commander: General de flotilă aeriană Ciprian Marin
- Occupants: 951st Advanced Air Training Squadron; 952nd Helicopter Squadron

Airfield information
- Identifiers: IATA: BCM, ICAO: LRBC
- Elevation: 185 metres (607 ft) AMSL
Runways
Direction	Length and surface
16/34	2,500 metres (8,202 ft) Asphalt
- March: "Drumul spre Casă" (The road to home)

The Romanian Air Force 95th Air Base "Captain Alexandru Șerbănescu" (Romanian: Baza 95 Aeriană "Căpitan Aviator Alexandru Șerbănescu") is an air force base adjacent to George Enescu International Airport, Romania, south of Bacău, Bacău County.

The current base was organized on 25 August 1995, having as its purpose the support of the 95th Fighter Group training. From 1 May 2001 until 1 July 2004, during the military reorganization process, the Supersonic Jet Training Center operated in the Bacău air base, preserving the tradition of training the young pilots according to the MIG-21 LanceR program. Since 1 July 2004, the 95th Air Base has undergone a thorough reorganization.

The base is currently the home of the 951st Advanced Air Training Squadron, operating the IAR 99 Șoim, and of the 952nd Helicopter Squadron, operating IAR 330L and IAR 330 SOCAT.

== History ==
=== Origins ===
The unit traces its origins to the Aviation Training Center established on 16 June 1920 in Tecuci from the 4th Aviation Group (Grupul 4 Aviație). In 1924, it became the Aeronautics Training Center. After the Second World War, the training center was reorganized, being eventually disbanded in 1953. The Aviation Training Center was reestablished on 1 December 1968, being headquartered on the Bacău airfield. From 1969 until 1995, the air base was used for the pilots' transition training to supersonic aircraft.

=== Post-1990 ===
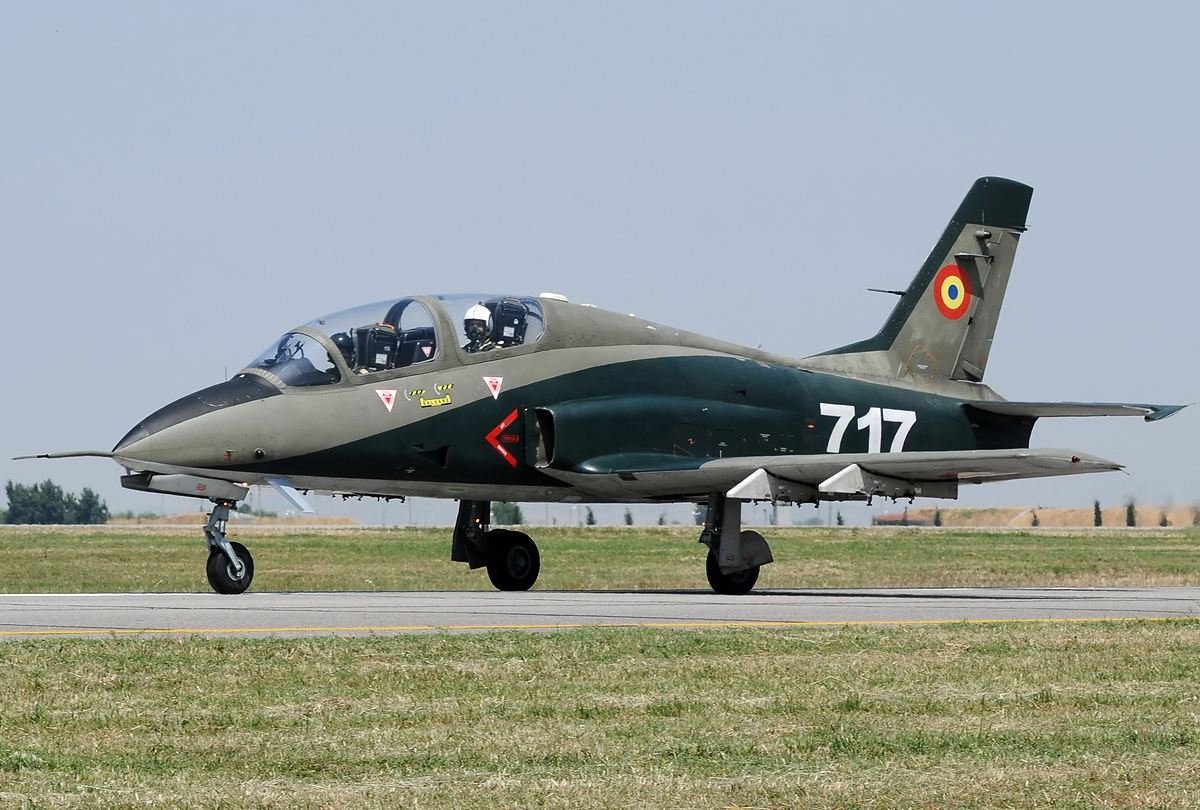
An IAR 99 Șoim of the 95th Air Base

Between 1992 and 2003, the base was equipped with Antonov An-2 aircraft which were used for transport and paratrooper missions. On 25 August 1995, the 95th Fighter-Bombardment Air Base was formed, meant to ensure the training and conducting of the combat missions of the 95th Fighter Aviation Group. It also supported the testing of the MiG-21 LanceR project of the Aerostar company. In 1997, it became the first base to receive the MiG-21 LanceR.

On 1 May 2001, the base was transformed into the 95th Supersonic Jet Training Center following a restructuring program for the Air Force. In the same year, two helicopter squadrons, equipped with IAR 316 and IAR 330 helicopters, were also added to the base after the disbanding of the 60th Helicopter Group from Tecuci. On 1 July 2004, the base was renamed to the 95th Air Base.

In 2006, the base received the honorific name "Captain Alexandru Șerbănescu". Between 2010 and 2013, the base was called the 95th Air Flotilla. In 2010, it received the IAR 330 SOCAT helicopters, and in 2012 it received the IAR 99 Șoim airplanes.

The base was decorated with the Order of Aeronautical Virtue in 2010, and with the National Order of Merit in 2020.

== Based units ==
The following flying and non-flying units are located at Bacău.

Air Force General Staff

- 95th Air Base Command
  - 95th Air Operations Center
  - 95th Operational Group
    - 951st Advanced Air Training Squadron
    - 952nd Combat Helicopter Squadron
  - 95th Force Protection Group
    - 954th Anti-Aircraft Artillery Battalion
    - 956th Military Police Company
    - 958th CBRN Defence Platoon
  - 95th Support Group
    - 955th Air Communications and Air Navigation Technical Systems Company
    - 957th Infrastructure Company
    - Engineer Company
    - Transport Company
    - Service Platoon

== Decorations ==
The 95th Air Base has received the following decorations:

- National Order of Merit, Peacetime (Knight – 2020)
- Order of Aeronautical Virtue, Peacetime (Knight – 2010)

== Gallery ==
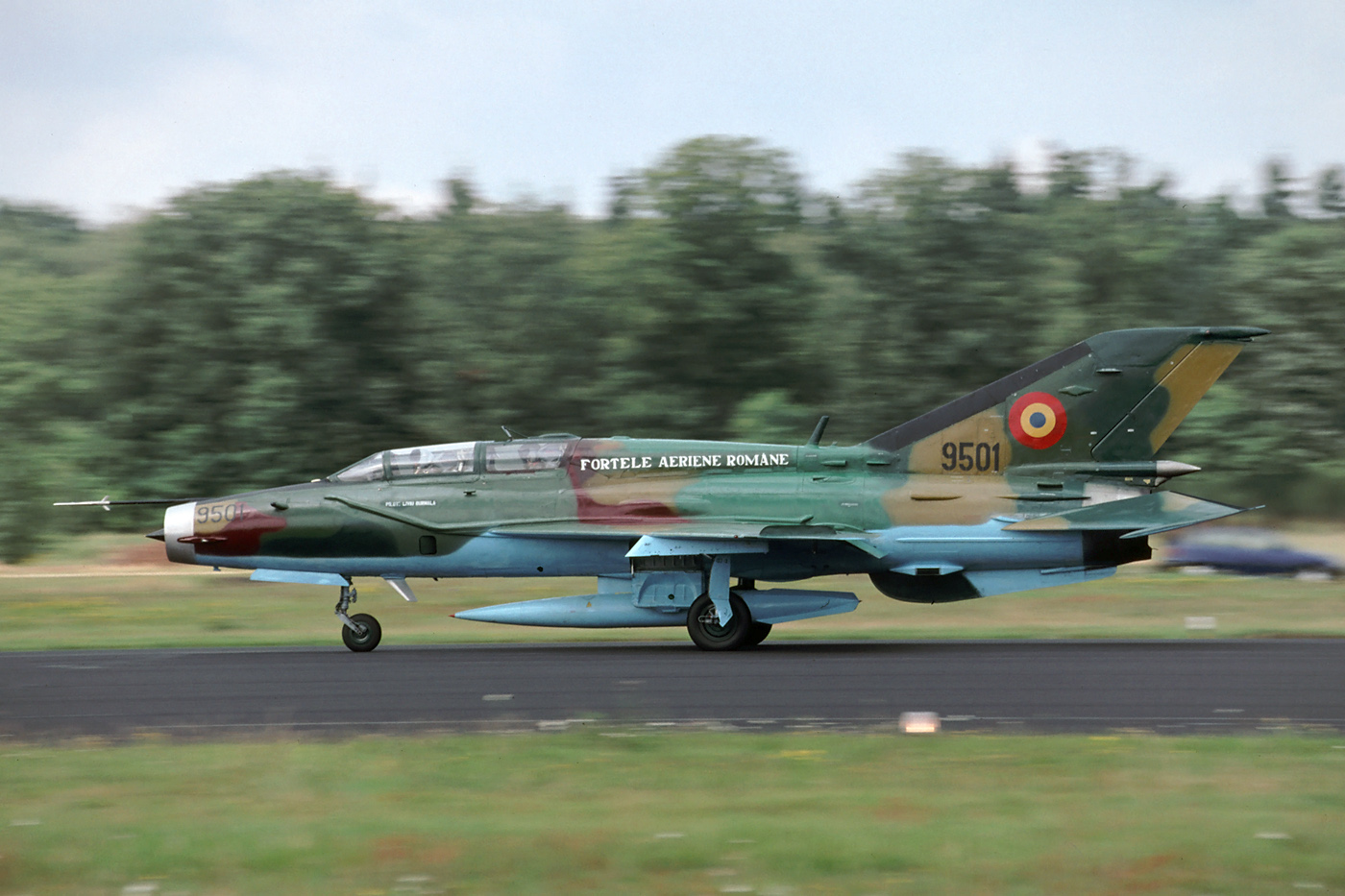
MiG-21 LanceR B from the Bacău Air Base at Twenthe Airbase in 2000

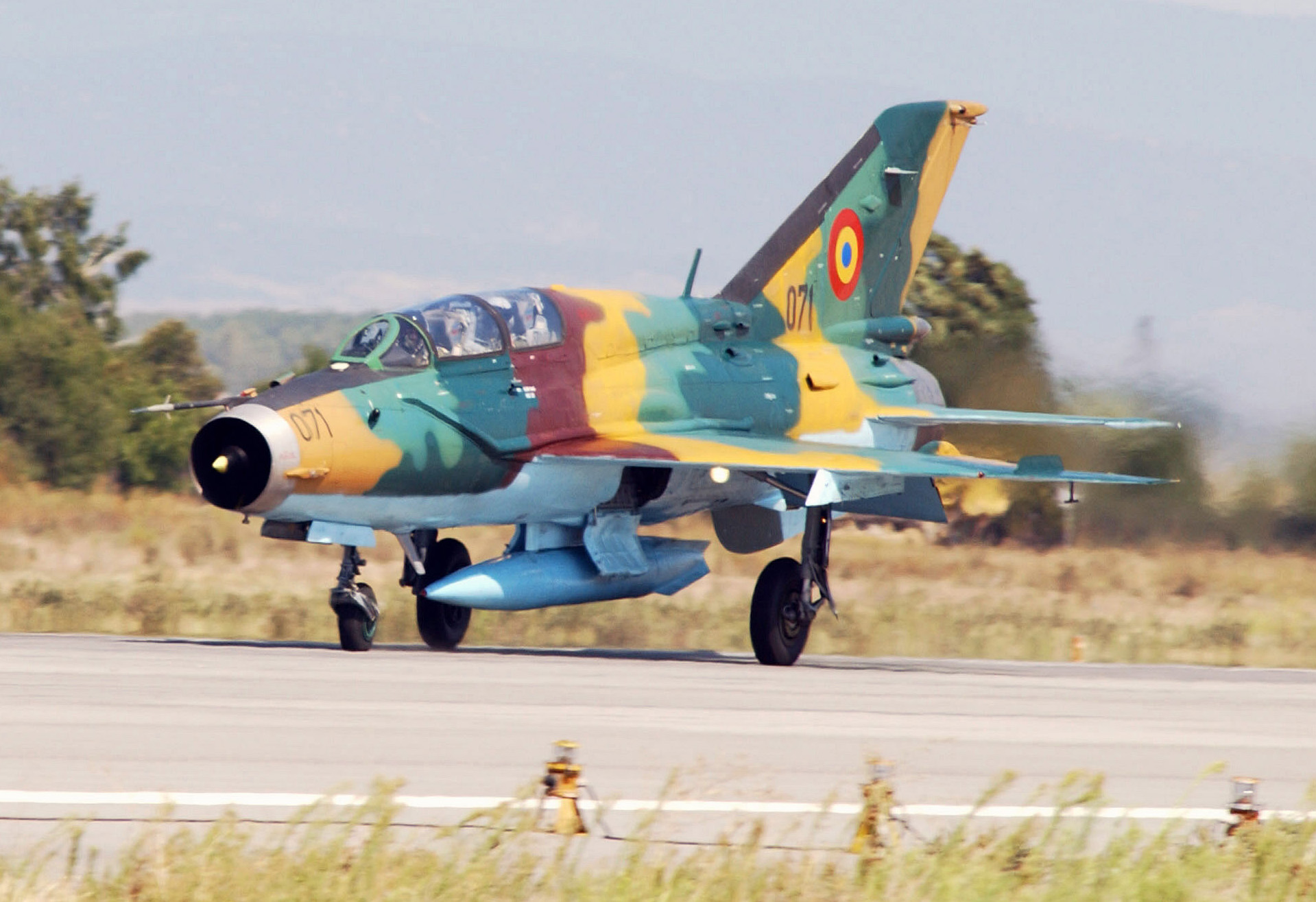
MiG-21 LanceR B of the 951st Fighter Squadron, Cooperative Key 2003 at Graf Ignatievo Air Base, Bulgaria.

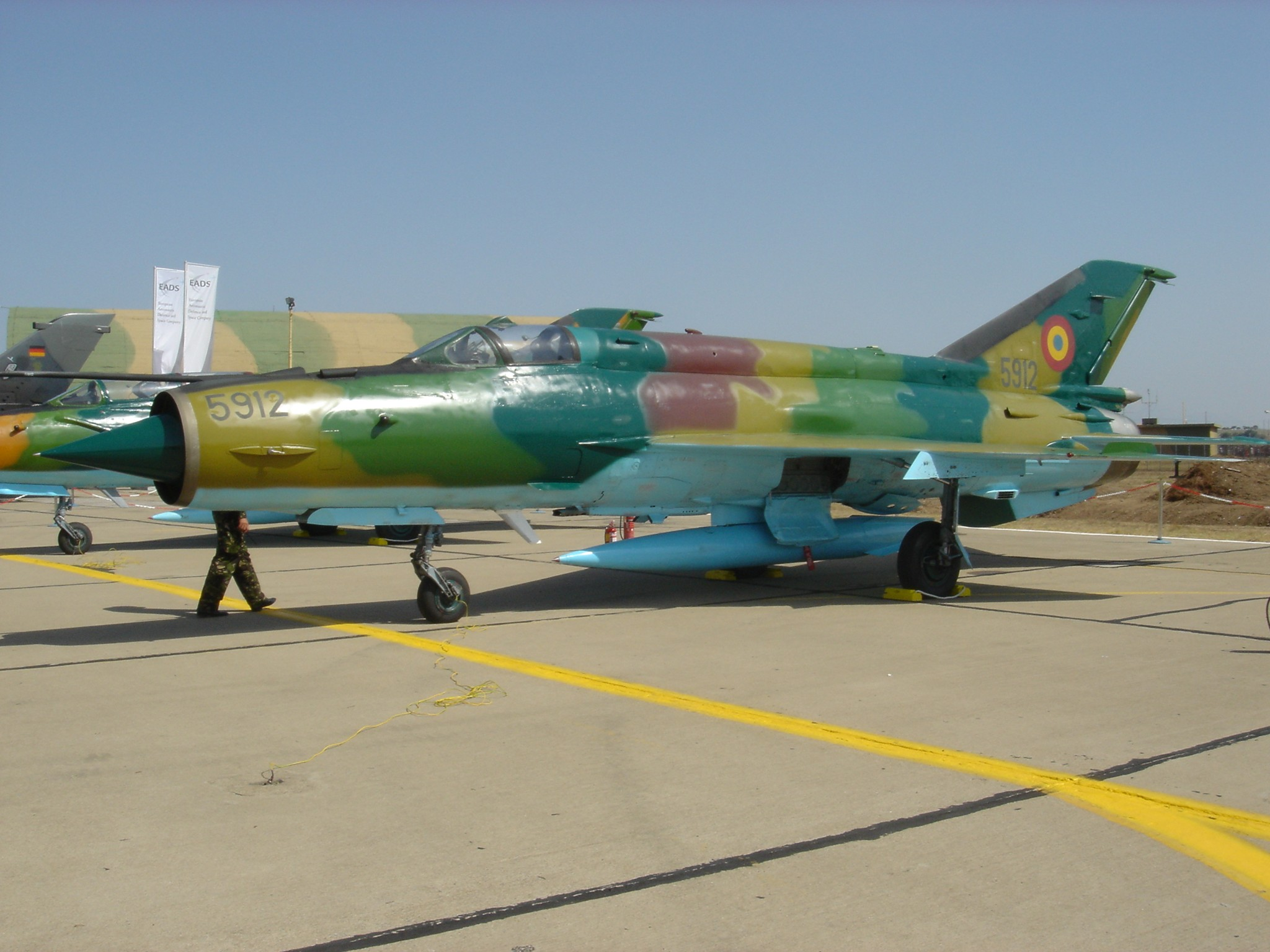
MiG-21 LanceR A of the 951st Fighter Squadron at Archangel 2005 airshow.

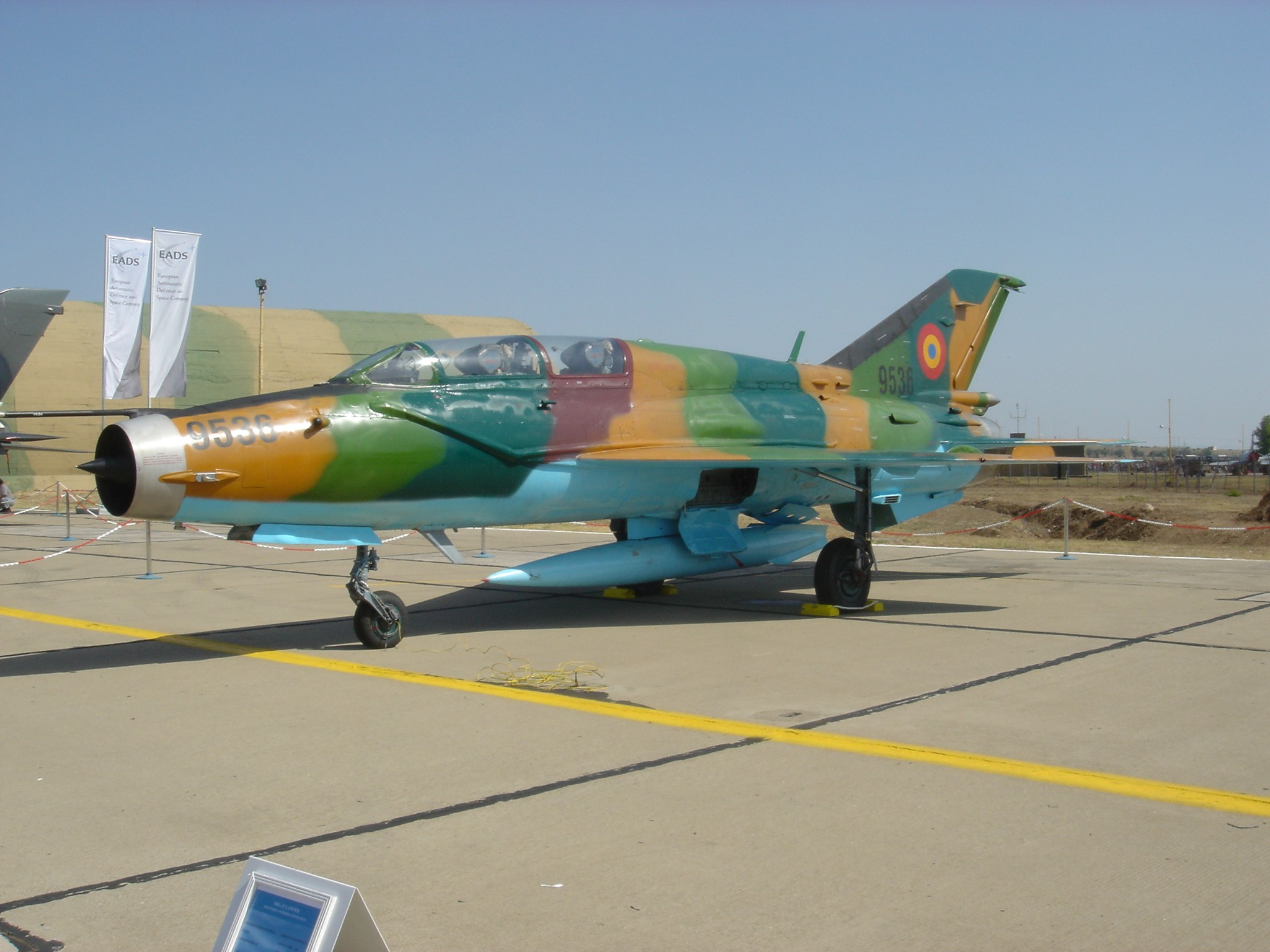
MiG-21 LanceR B of the 951st Fighter Squadron at Archangel 2005 airshow.
