= Romanian Air Force =

Air warfare branch of Romania's military

- Forțele Aeriene Române
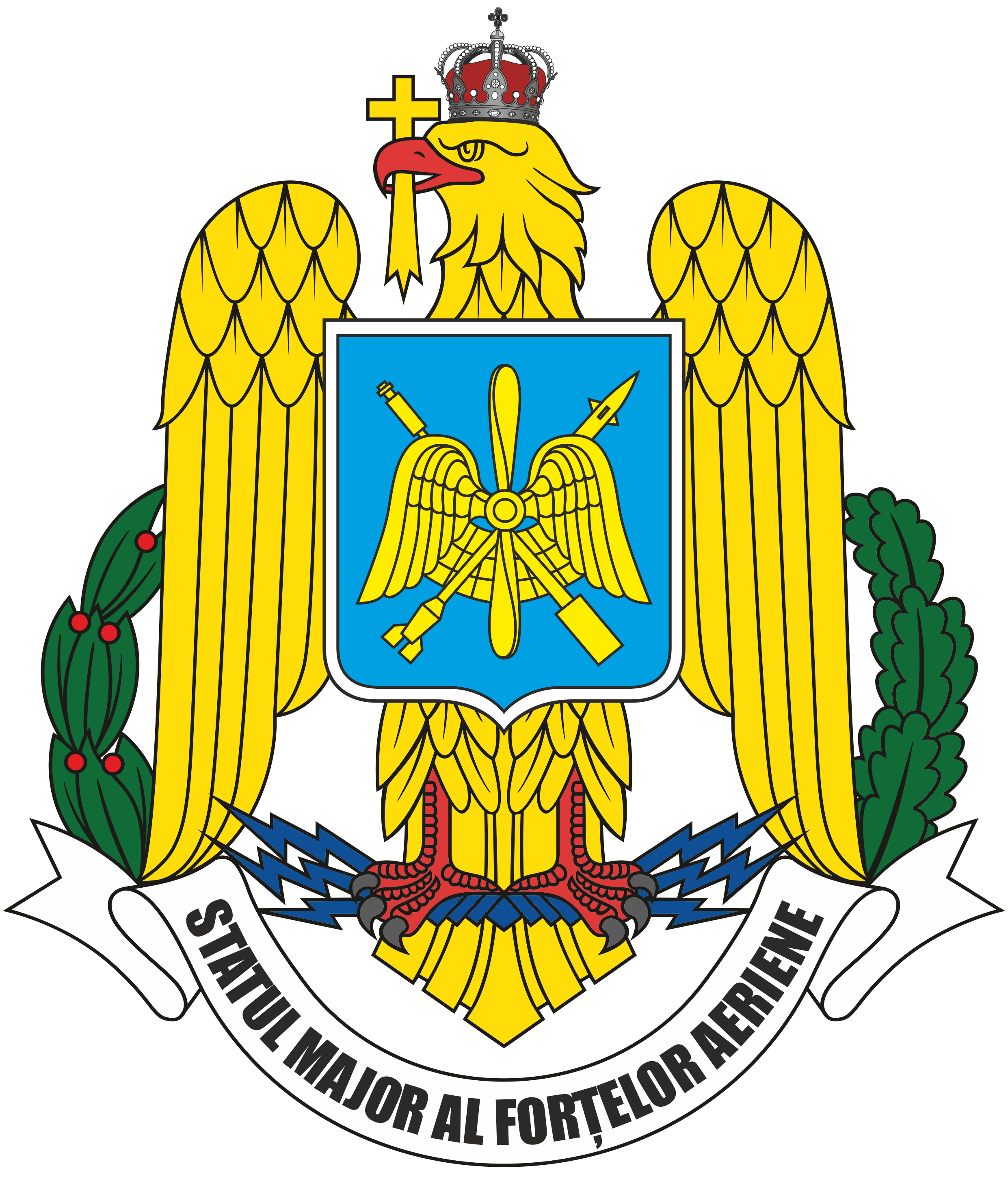
- Emblem of the Romanian Air Force
- Founded: 1 April 1913; 113 years ago; 1 January 1924 as an independent force category
- Country: Romania
- Type: Air force
- Role: Aerial warfare
- Size: 11,700 personnel
- Part of: Romanian Armed Forces
- Headquarters: Bucharest
- Anniversaries: 20 July

Commanders
- Chief of the Air Force Staff: Lieutenant general Leonard-Gabriel Baraboi

Insignia
- Roundel

- Military colors

- Identification flag (obverse)

- Aviator badge

Aircraft flown
- Fighter: F-16AM MLU
- Attack helicopter: IAR 330 SOCAT
- Trainer helicopter: IAR 316
- Utility helicopter: IAR 330L/M Puma
- Reconnaissance: Antonov An-30
- Trainer: F-16BM, IAR 99, Iak-52
- Transport: Antonov An-26, C-130 Hercules, C-27J Spartan

The Romanian Air Force (abbr. RoAF, Romanian: Forțele Aeriene Române) is the air force branch of the Romanian Armed Forces. It has an air force headquarters, an operational command, five air bases, a logistics base, an air defense brigade, an air defense regiment and an ISR brigade. Reserve forces include one air base and two airfields. In 2022, the Romanian Air Force employed 11,700 personnel. The current chief of the Romanian Air Force Staff is Lieutenant general Leonard-Gabriel Baraboi, who succeeded Lieutenant general Viorel Pană on 29 November 2023.

The Romanian Air Force was first formed as the Military Aeronautics Service on 1 April 1913, transformed into the Romanian Air Corps in 1915. The Army-subordinated Air Corps was reorganized as the independent Royal Romanian Air Force on 1 January 1924, then converted to the present-day Air Force in 1949. The Air Force went through a modernization plan in the 1990s and early 2000s, dropping the communist-era organization system in 1995 and adopting a NATO-compatible one instead as the country was preparing to join the Alliance.

== Current state ==
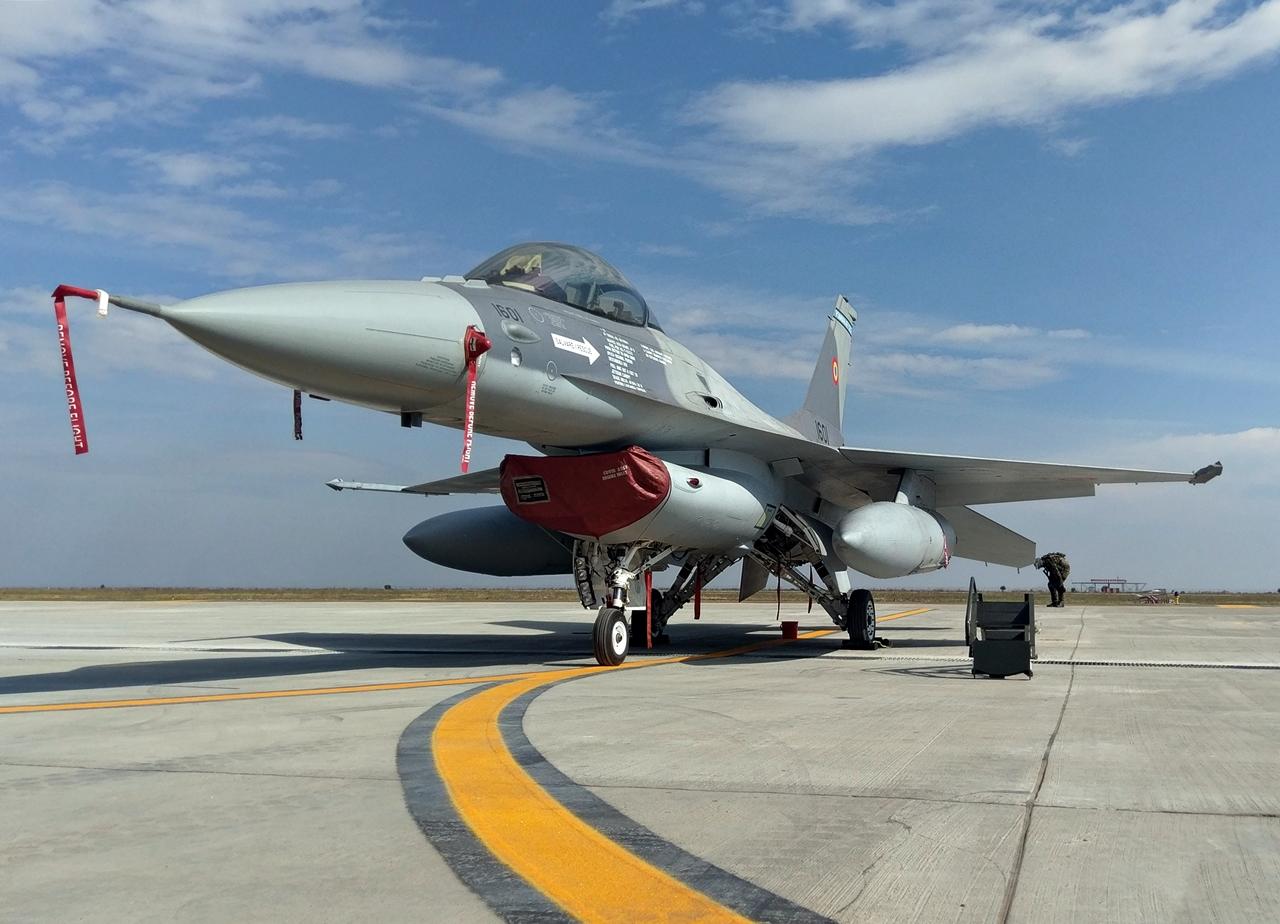
Romanian F-16 at the 86th Air Base Fetești in October 2016 (Note: Pictured is F-16 no. 1601, which shot down a drone on 26 July 2026)

The Romanian Air Force operates F-16 Fighting Falcon multirole combat aircraft. Three fighter squadrons (Note: Two of which are operational as of 2026) maintaining the Permanent Combat Service - Air Policing and one training squadron are equipped with the F-16s. For the transport role, the Romanian Air Force uses C-130 Hercules, C-27J Spartan and An-26 transport airplanes and IAR 330 helicopters. IAR 330 Puma SOCAT helicopters, modernized by the Romanian Aviation Industry (IAR) in cooperation with Elbit Systems (from Israel), are used in an attack role. The Romanian Air Force also includes locally built IAR 99 Șoim jets, mostly used for training missions.

In July 2023, the Supreme Council of National Defence (CSAT) approved the plan to host an F-16 training center in Romania. The center was planned as a regional training hub for Romanian and other allied fighter pilots, including Ukrainians. To support this decision, an international coalition of 11 nations, (Note: Denmark, the Netherlands, Belgium, Canada, Luxembourg, Norway, Poland, Portugal, Romania, Sweden and the United Kingdom) as well as Ukraine was formed during the 2023 Vilnius summit. In November 2023, the European F-16 Training Center became operational at the Romanian 86th Air Base. The Netherlands provided the F-16s, and Lockheed Martin with its subcontractor Draken International provided the instructors and technicians. The first Ukrainian pilots started training at the center in September 2024 after a first group of Romanian pilots. The 18 Dutch F-16s were formally transferred to Romania on 3 November for a symbolic price of €1.

To replace the aging MiG-21 LanceRs, the Romanian Air Force procured F-16 fighters from partner states. In 2013, Romania signed a contract with Portugal for 12 F-16AM/BM MLU fighters. Under the Peace Carpathian program, the first six fighters entered service with the Romanian Air Force in September 2016, followed by another three in November and the last three in 2017. Romania ordered another five F-16s from Portugal in 2019, and the fighters were delivered by March 2021.

Another contract for an additional 32 F-16s was signed with Norway in 2022 for $385 million, and the first Norwegian F-16s arrived in 2023. Under the contract, the F-16s were modified to the Romanian M6.5.2 configuration. Kongsberg Aviation Maintenance Services provided support, maintenance, and training for Romanian technical personnel. As of 2025, maintenance for the Romanian F-16 fleet is carried out in the country at Aerostar with a capacity of servicing six jets at the same time.

On 11 April 2023, CSAT approved the acquisition plan for the fifth-generation F-35 joint strike fighter. The contract was signed on 21 November 2024. The F-35 program is divided in two stages, first of 32 aircraft and the second of 16 aircraft for a total of 48 F-35s which will replace the F-16s between 2034 and 2040. The first batch of eight F-35s is scheduled to arrive in the country in 2032, after undergoing pilot training at the Ebbing Air National Guard Base, Arkansas.

== History ==
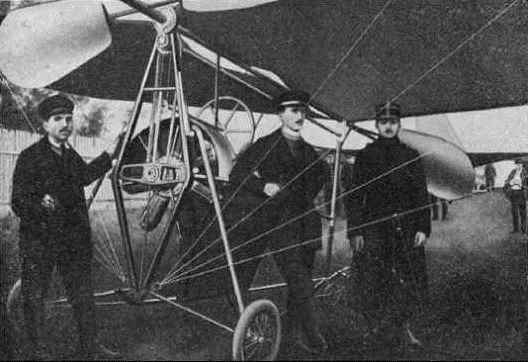
A. Vlaicu Nr. I at military exercises, 27 September 1910

=== Beginnings ===
In 1818, during the reign of John Caradja, the prince of Wallachia, an unmanned hot air balloon was flown off Dealul Spirii in Bucharest. On 2 July [O.S. 20 June] 1874, Marius Willemot, the owner of the hydrogen balloon named Mihai Bravul flew together with Majors Iacob Lahovary, Constantin Poenaru and Dumitrescu over Bucharest. The last flight took place on 19 [O.S. 7 July] 1874, Willemot flying together with Colonel Nicolae Haralambie, Ion Ghica and a third person. The balloon had made its first flight in Paris on 27 March of the same year.

The first aeronautical unit of Romania was established in 1893 under the 1st Telegraph Company in the 1st Engineer Regiment. The role of this unit was to operate the observation balloons for aerial surveillance in support of the artillery units defending the fortifications of Bucharest. In 1913, the unit was reorganized into the "Aerostation Company" which became part of the Military Aeronautics Service.

On 20 November 1909, the Chitila Piloting School was formed as a joint venture by Mihail Cerchez. The school, conducted by French flight instructors, had five hangars, bleachers for spectators and workshops where the Farman airplanes were built under license. It was opened on 9 July 1910, led by the chief flight instructor and director of the school René Guillemin who was soon replaced by Michel-Paul Molla after an accident. The first pilot licensed at Chitila was Sublocotenent Ștefan Protopopescu on 9 July 1911. The school closed in late 1912 due to financial difficulties, having trained six officers, but only licensed two.

In November 1909, the Romanian Minister of War commissioned Aurel Vlaicu to build the A Vlaicu I airplane at the Bucharest Army Arsenal which first flew on 17 June 1910. On 28 September during the fall military exercise, Vlaicu flew his airplane from Slatina to Piatra Olt carrying a message, Romania thus becoming one of the first countries to use airplanes for military purposes. Along with other Romanian pilots, Vlaicu flew reconnaissance missions during the Second Balkan War. Vlaicu III, the first metal aircraft in the world, was completed after his death, in May 1914.

On 1 April 1913, the first law on the organization of military aeronautics was issued, thus forming the Military Aeronautics Service (Serviciul de Aeronautică Militară), later reorganized as the Romanian Air Corps (Corpul de Aviație Român) in 1915. Organized as such, the Romanian aviation participated in the Second Balkan War, becoming the first air arm to perform operations over an enemy capital city, with leaflet drop missions flown over Sofia.

=== World War I ===
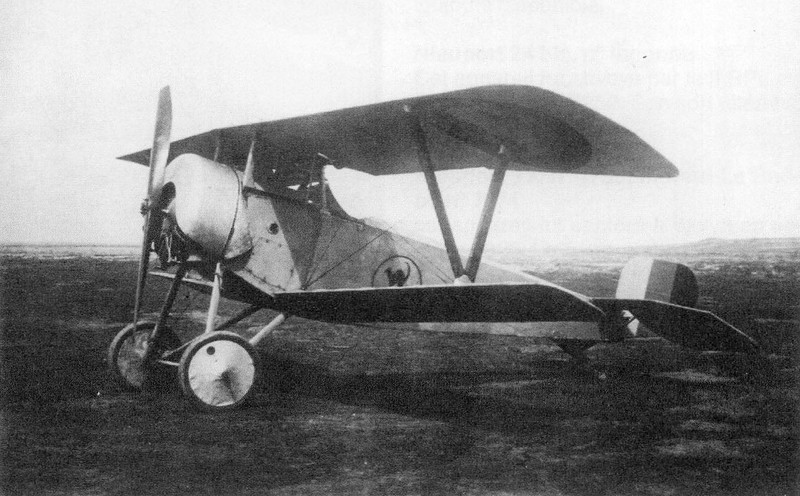
A Romanian Nieuport 11 (Note: The blue color on the tail appears nearly white in the black and white photograph)

On the eve of Romania's entrance into the war in August 1916, only 24 out of the 44 aircraft that had been imported and assembled at Rezerva generală a aviației (RGA) were available. Another 20 aircraft were provided by the flight schools. These aircraft included Bristol T.B.8s, Bristol Coanda Monoplanes, Blériot XIs, and other Farman aircraft. One of the Vlaicu monoplanes, A Vlaicu II, crashed in 1913, while the A Vlaicu I was retired in 1914, leaving A Vlaicu III as the sole Romanian-made aircraft in the Romanian Air Corps. Also in 1916, the Anti-aircraft Defence Corps was formed and equipped with searchlights and locally converted anti-aircraft guns, which included the "Negrei" and "Burileanu" systems.

During World War I, Romania acquired 322 aircraft from France and ex-RNAS aircraft from Great Britain including Nieuport 11 and 17 single seat fighters, Morane-Saulnier LA and Nieuport 12 two seat fighters, Caudron G.3, Henry Farman HF.20, Farman MF.11 and Farman F.40 artillery observation and reconnaissance aircraft, as well as Caudron G.4, Breguet-Michelin BLM and Voisin LA bombers. On 16 September 1916, a Romanian Farman F.40 downed an Imperial German Air Service aircraft near Slobozia; this was the first Romanian aerial victory. By the end of World War I, Romanian pilots had flown about 11,000 hours and 750 missions; however, this was unable to prevent the December 1916 Romanian offensive at the Battle of the Argeș from being defeated, which resulted in the occupation of southern Romania, and the armistice on 6 December 1917 following the Russian revolution. Still, the air corps played a significant role in the 1917 summer campaign by maintaining air supremacy over the battlefield and providing reconnaissance for the ground troops, helping secure the victories in the three battles. The Romanian Air Corps ended the war with 106–146 enemy aircraft shot down in total. (Note: Both by aircraft and by anti-aircraft artillery) Other victories were achieved in the Hungarian–Romanian War of 1919. According to the Romanian aerial victory standards, one pilot achieved the status of flying ace, Second lieutenant Dumitru Bădulescu who scored eight victories, of which three unconfirmed.

=== Interwar ===
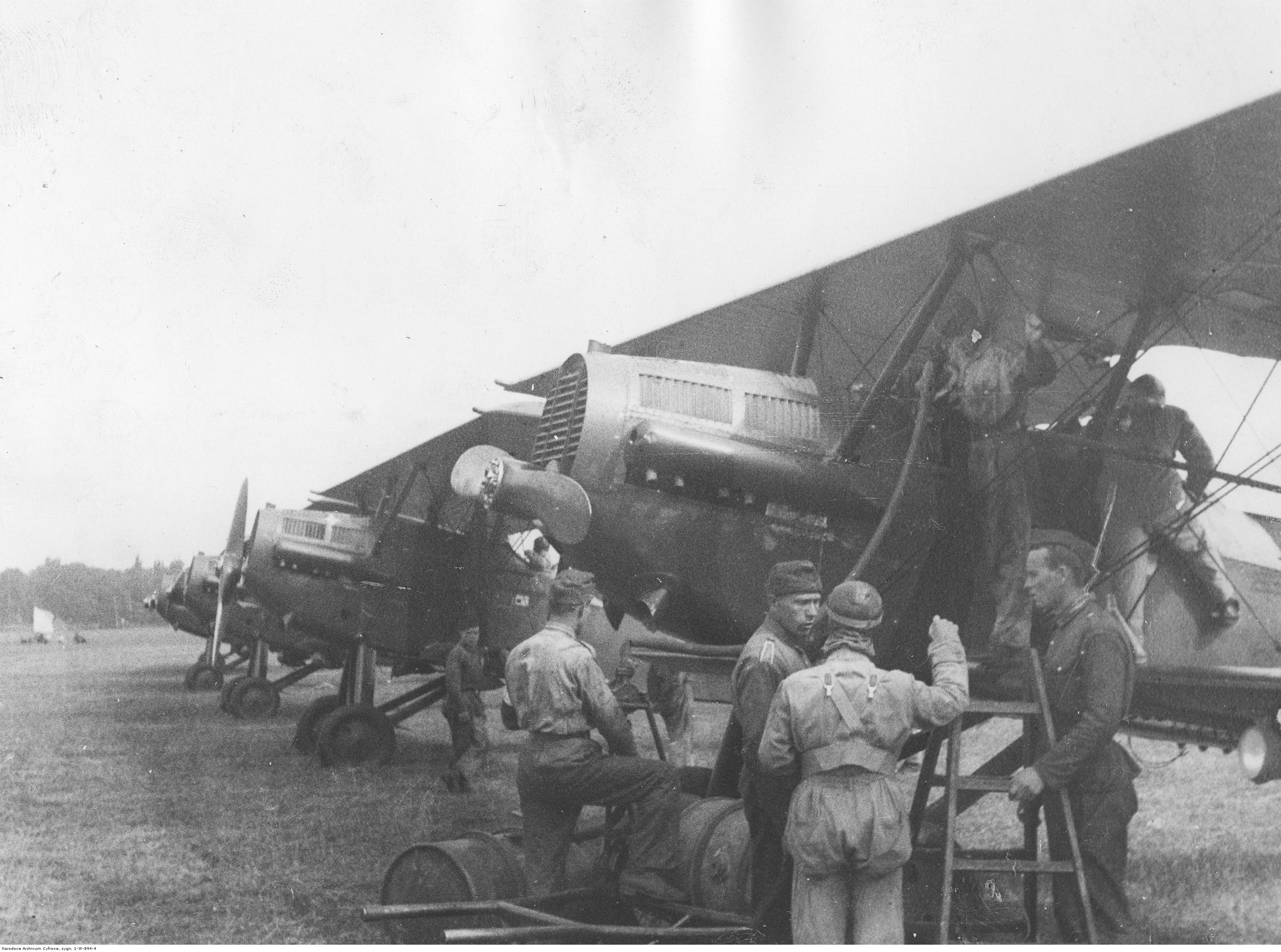
IAR-produced Potez 25 airplanes in 1931

The beginning of the interwar period saw a new organization for the Air Corps with units deployed throughout the country. The process of acquiring new aircraft to replace the old World War I ones also continued. On 1 January 1924, the Army-subordinated Air Corps was reorganized as a separate military branch. It was named Aeronautica Regală Română (ARR, lit. 'Romanian Royal Aeronautics') and placed under the command of the General Inspectorate of Aeronautics. The number of aviators and aircraft built either under license or locally designed also continued to grow. This led to the formation of the aviation flotillas (air wings) in 1929 from the previous aviation groups. By 1936, the Air Force's aircraft were largely obsolete and the mounting political and military tensions in Europe led to calls for a restructuring plan of the ARR. The drafted plan proposed equipping 36 new squadrons with modern combat aircraft within two years. Due to continued delays, delegations for acquiring new aircraft were only sent in April 1939. The aircraft inventory quickly grew in size with deliveries from Germany and the United Kingdom. Also in 1939, a large number of Polish aircraft arrived following the invasion of Poland and were brought into Romanian service.

=== World War II ===
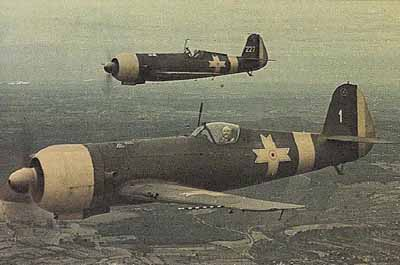
A pair of IAR 80 fighters on patrol during World War II

When Romania, allied with Nazi Germany, went to war against the Soviet Union on 22 June 1941, the ARR had 621 airplanes, including its locally made IAR 80 fighters. The air force accomplished hundreds of missions, contributing to Romania's recapture of Northern Bucovina and Bessarabia, which had been occupied by the Soviet Union a year earlier. By the end of the Siege of Odessa, the Romanian military fighters claimed about 600 air victories. The Royal Romanian Air Force fought on the Eastern Front, and in the defense of the country against Allied air raids, until 23 August 1944, bringing an important contribution to the great battles at Stalingrad, in Crimea, and the Ukrainian fronts. Between 1941 and 1944, Romanian aircraft won 2,000 air victories. The most famous flying aces were Captain Prince Constantin Cantacuzino, who gained 69 certified victories by the Romanian air victory standards, Captain Alexandru Șerbănescu, with 55 victories, and Captain Horia Agarici with 13 victories.

In the aftermath of King Michael's Coup of 23 August 1944, Romania turned against Germany and joined the Allies. Between 24 and 31 August the ARR fought against the Luftwaffe, destroying 59 German aircraft. Continuing the campaign against the Axis, the Royal Romanian Air Force, organized in the 1st Air Corps, aided the Soviet and Romanian armies until 18 May 1945. The last victory scored by a Romanian pilot, although not officially registered, happened on 4 May when a Soviet Yak-3 was shot down in a clash with two Romanian Bf 109s. In the 1944-1945 campaign, the Air Force destroyed 126 enemy aircraft in battle (Note: Shot down by aircraft and by anti-aircraft artillery) while losing 176 aircraft itself, of which 30 in combat and the rest mainly in accidents.

=== Cold War ===
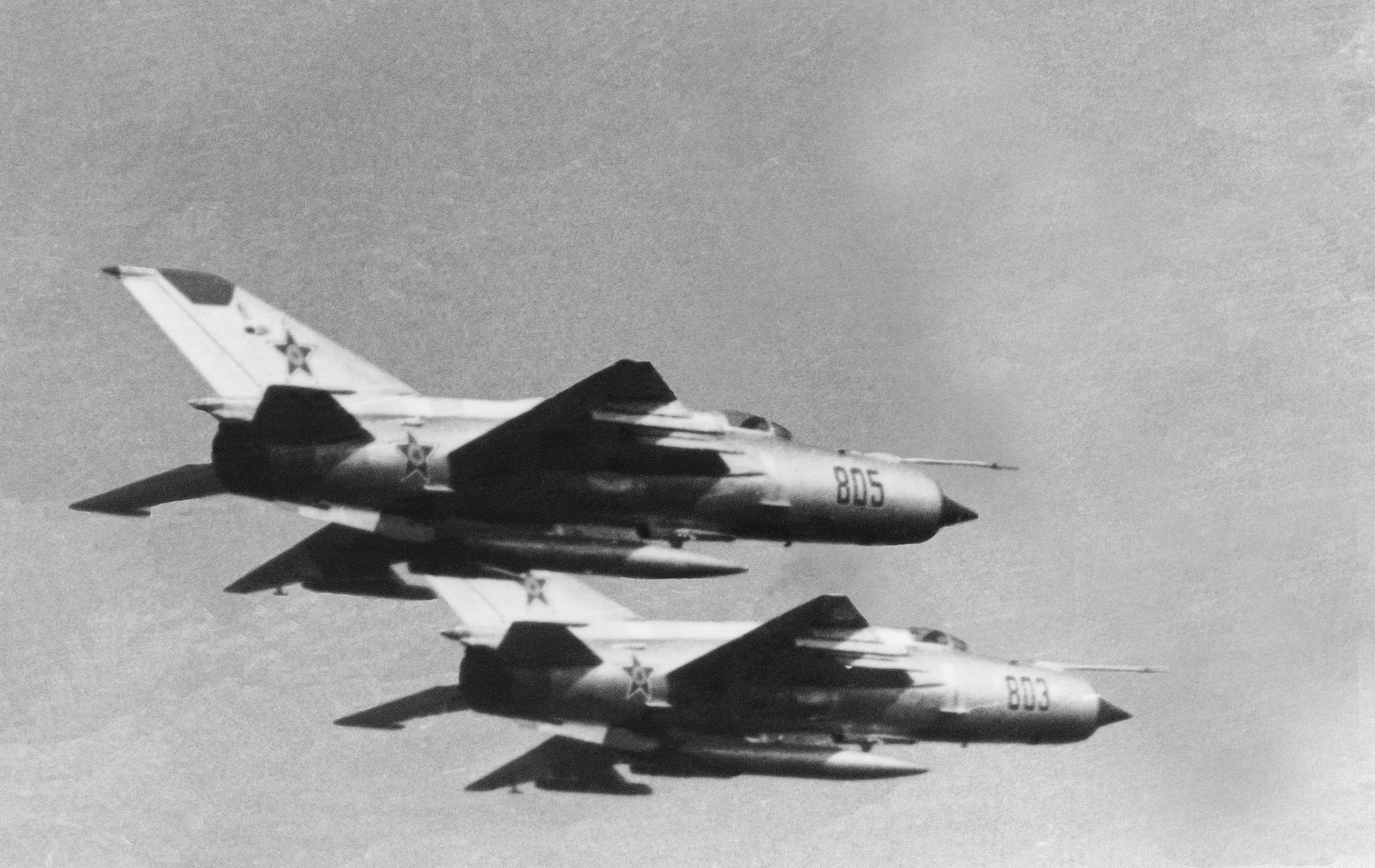
A pair of Romanian MiG-21 fighters, late 1970s

Starting in 1948, Romania tailored its military to Soviet concepts and doctrine. On 15 February 1949, the Aviation Command was established based on the Soviet model, regiments replacing the flotillas. A year later, on 1 April 1950, the military aviation was named Forțele Aeriene Militare (lit. 'Military Air Forces'). In the following years, new Soviet aircraft, such as Yakovlev Yak-18, Polikarpov Po-2, Lavochkin La-9, Tupolev Tu-2, and Ilyushin Il-10 entered service. The first jet fighters – Yakovlev Yak-17s and Yak-23s entered service in 1951, followed in 1952 by another 88 MiG-15 aircraft. In 1958, the first supersonic fighter MiG-19 entered the inventory. Three years later, in February 1962, a new fighter was added to the inventory, the MiG-21, which represented one of the most effective fighters of that time.

Starting in 1974, Romanian-made aircraft supplemented the already existing jets. The Romanian IAR-93 attack aircraft flew its first flight on 31 October 1974. It represented a great step forward taking into account that it was the only jet fighter not made by the Soviets, the only one ever manufactured and operated by a Warsaw Pact country.

In February 1956, the first helicopter squadron was established, followed by the reception of the first helicopter, a Soviet Mi-4, a few months later. In 1961, the squadron received other Mi-4s, while PZL SM-1 and SM-2 helicopters equipped another squadron. From 1968, Mi-8 helicopters also entered service. In 1971, the first Romanian-manufactured helicopters entered service – the SA 316 Alouette III produced under license by IAR as the IAR 316. Renewing the aircraft fleet process went on with the first MiG-23s arriving on 23 January 1979.

On 14 May 1981, at 20:16, the Soviet spaceship Soyuz 40 was launched from Baikonur to perform a common Romanian-Soviet flight, with Lieutenant Dumitru Prunariu and Colonel Leonid Popov as commander on board. During the early 1980s, the 67th Fighter-Bomber Regiment and the 49th Fighter-Bomber Regiment from Craiova and Ianca were equipped with new IAR-93s, which replaced old MiG-15s and MiG-17s. In December 1989, just a few days before the Romanian revolution against communism began, MiG-29 aircraft entered the Air Force inventory. Initially, 45 MiG-29s were ordered but only 21 were delivered, with the rest of the order being cancelled. The MiG-29s were assigned to the 2nd and 3rd Squadrons of the 57th Fighter Regiment located at the Mihail Kogălniceanu Airport.

=== Post-1989 ===
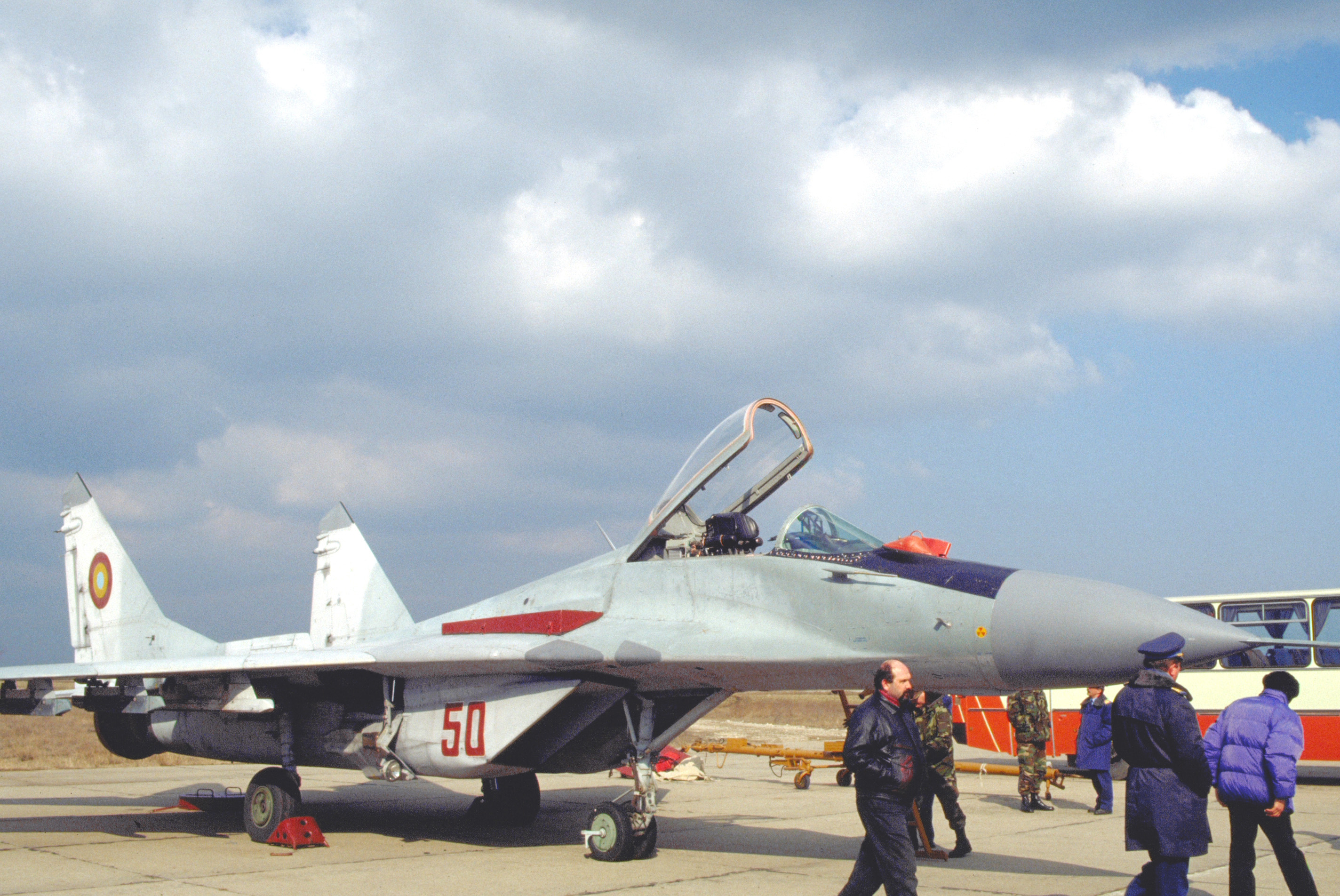
The MiG-29 was withdrawn in 2003

In 1990, the last MiG-15 fighters were retired from the 49th Aviation Regiment, located in Ianca. In 1992, production of the IAR-93 was stopped following the start of the Yugoslav Civil Wars. The last IAR-93s were retired in 1998. By 1 June 1995 the Air Force dropped the communist era regimental system in favor of a system consisting of Air Bases, Groups and Squadrons.

Due to financial constraints, being unable to purchase new fighters, the Romanian Air Force decided to invest in the upgrade of the MiG-21 fighters. Following a competition between several companies, the Israeli company Elbit was chosen, and the MiG-21M and MF/MF-75 versions were selected. The program was originally called the "DD program" as a tribute to the fighter pilot and writer Doru Davidovici, who died in a MiG-21 crash in 1989. The upgrade program was later renamed to "Lancer", designated as "LanceR" with capital "R" in Romania. The first flight of an upgraded MiG, a LanceR 'A' ground attack variant, took place on 22 August 1995.

The Romanian MiG-29 fleet was also intended to undergo modernization under a project named "Sniper" done by DASA, Aerostar and Elbit. The first flight took place on 5 May 2000 and the prototype was presented at ILA 2000. However, the modernization project was canceled due to various reasons and the MiG-29s were retired.

Following its entry into the Partnership for Peace program in 1994, Romania started cooperating with other countries with the goal of eventually joining NATO. For this, Romanian Air Force aircraft participated in many local or abroad exercises and airshows. Before joining NATO, the 86th Group at Borcea started to convert into a NATO compatible unit by making improvements to the base's infrastructure, allowing its pilots to fly a fair amount of training hours and work according to NATO procedures.

During the period of reorganization, starting from the year 2000, other aircraft models such as the MiG-23 fighters, the Harbin H-5 bombers and the IAR 823 and L-39 Albatros trainers were retired, the latter of which was retired in 2007. Along with the retiring of airplanes, several bases were disbanded as well, including the Alexeni Airfield, the 49th Air Base from Ianca and the 91st Air Base from Deveselu. The 93rd Air Base from Timișoara was also disbanded and currently serves as an annex to the 71st Air Base.

In the spring of 2009, the Romanian government decided to purchase VSHORAD/SHORAD systems from France. The deal included Mistral MANPADS and MICA VL surface-to-air missiles. However, after preliminary talks with MBDA in August, the deal was put on hold and canceled afterwards because of the defense cuts.

In February 2010, CSAT signed an agreement with the United States for missile defence under whose terms land-based SM-3 systems would be installed in Romania. On 3 May 2011, the president of Romania Traian Băsescu announced the location for the SM-3 systems: former Air Force base Deveselu in the Olt County. The system includes 3 batteries with 24 SM-3 Block I rockets, manned by approximately 200 US soldiers (with a maximum of 500) initially under Romanian Air Force overall command. The Deveselu Aegis Ashore site was declared operational on 13 May 2016.

On 23 May 2022, the MiG-21 LanceRs resumed flights after being suspended on 15 April 2022. The LanceR continued to fly for a period of one year, until 15 May 2023 when they were retired.

==== Russian invasion of Ukraine ====
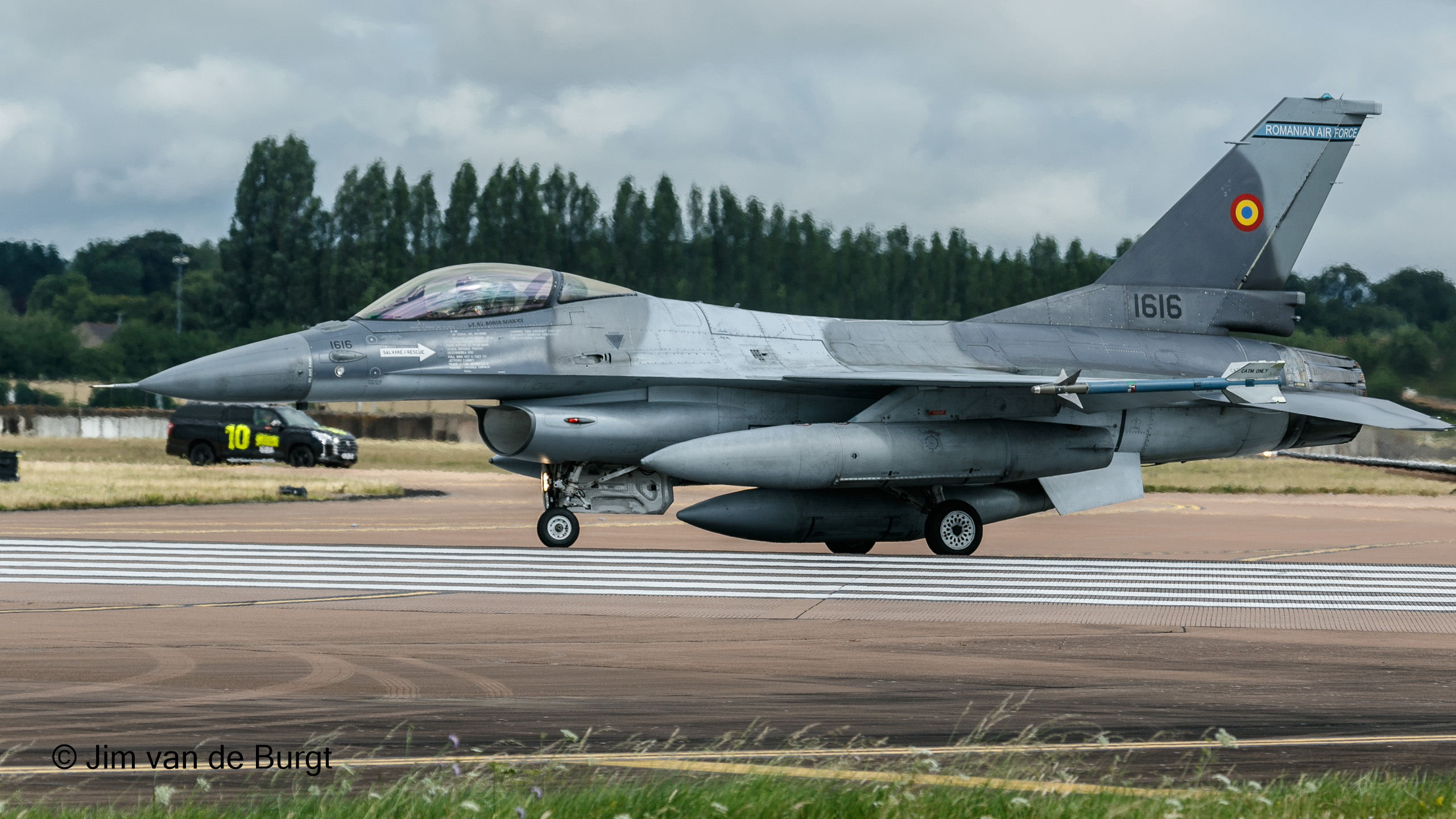
F-16 no. 1616, the first Romanian aircraft to score an aerial victory since WW2

On the starting day of the Russian invasion of Ukraine, two F-16s from the 53rd Fighter Squadron were sent to intercept a Sukhoi Su-27 of the Ukrainian Air Force that was approaching Romanian airspace. The Su-27 was escorted to the 95th Air Base where the pilot was taken by Romanian authorities. The Ukrainian Minister of Defence, Oleksiy Reznikov, quickly apologized for this event and requested the return of the airplane and its pilot. After a maintenance team from Ukraine fixed the technical issues of the fighter, the aircraft was returned without its weapons on 1 March, being escorted by two MiG-21 LanceRs to the border where other Ukrainian airplanes took over.

On 2 March 2022, a MiG-21 LanceR was lost while on an air patrol inside Romanian airspace near Cogealac, 60 miles from the Ukrainian border. This "occurred amid increased air police missions in Romania after the Russian invasion of Ukraine." An IAR 330 on a search and rescue mission for the missing MiG-21 crashed with seven fatalities. The eight servicemen who died in the two accidents were posthumously promoted and decorated by the president of Romania. Shortly after, fake news claiming that the Romanian MiG was shot down by Ukrainian S-300 missile systems appeared. These claims were officially refuted. The preliminary analysis published on 23 March showed that the crashes occurred due to human and environmental factors.

As of 13 December 2022, Romanian Air Force and allied aircraft took part in more than 150 air policing missions since the start of Russia's invasion. The majority of the missions involved Russian aircraft approaching Romanian airspace. Other missions involved coordinating civilian aircraft which had reported bomb threats or after their communications were interrupted.

On 19 May 2026, two Romanian F-16 fighter jets part of the Carpathian Vipers detachment on the Baltic Air Policing mission were scrambled by the Combined Air Operations Centre Uedem to intercept a drone which entered Estonian airspace during a Ukrainian attack on the Saint Petersburg region. The decision was taken to destroy the drone and the unmanned aircraft was shot down with an air-to-air missile around noon, marking the first Romanian aerial victory since the end of World War 2. The Ukrainian Minister of Defence issued an apology following this incident. The pilot who shot down the drone, Căpitan-Comandor Costel-Alexandru Pavelescu from the 86th Air Base, was decorated in the aftermath by Radu Miruță, the Romanian Minister of Defence.

Another drone was shot down over Romania on 24 July 2026, marking the first such incident over the country. The drone, identified by the pilots as a Shahed (Geran-2) type, was destroyed by a Romanian F-16 with an air-to-air missile over Padina, Buzău. A day later, a second drone was shot down over Romania near Sfântu Gheorghe, Tulcea by the same pilot who shot down the previous drone. On 26 July, a third drone was shot down in Romania. It was destroyed by an F-16 over the Black Sea in Romania's territorial waters, 12 km North-East off Sulina.

In the morning on 20 August 2026, a Romanian F-16 destroyed a naval drone near the Neptun Deep offshore platform using its onboard cannon. The drone was confirmed to not be Ukrainian through the direct communications channel established following the 5 June Ukrainian naval drone incident in Constanța. President Nicușor Dan attributed the incident to the Russian Federation.

In the late afternoon on 17 October, two jet-powered Geran-4 drones were shot down by Romanian F-16s within a four minute interval after they had entered Romanian airspace. Both drones were destroyed over Romania's territorial waters by two fighters from the 86th Air Base on Air Policing duty.

== International deployments ==
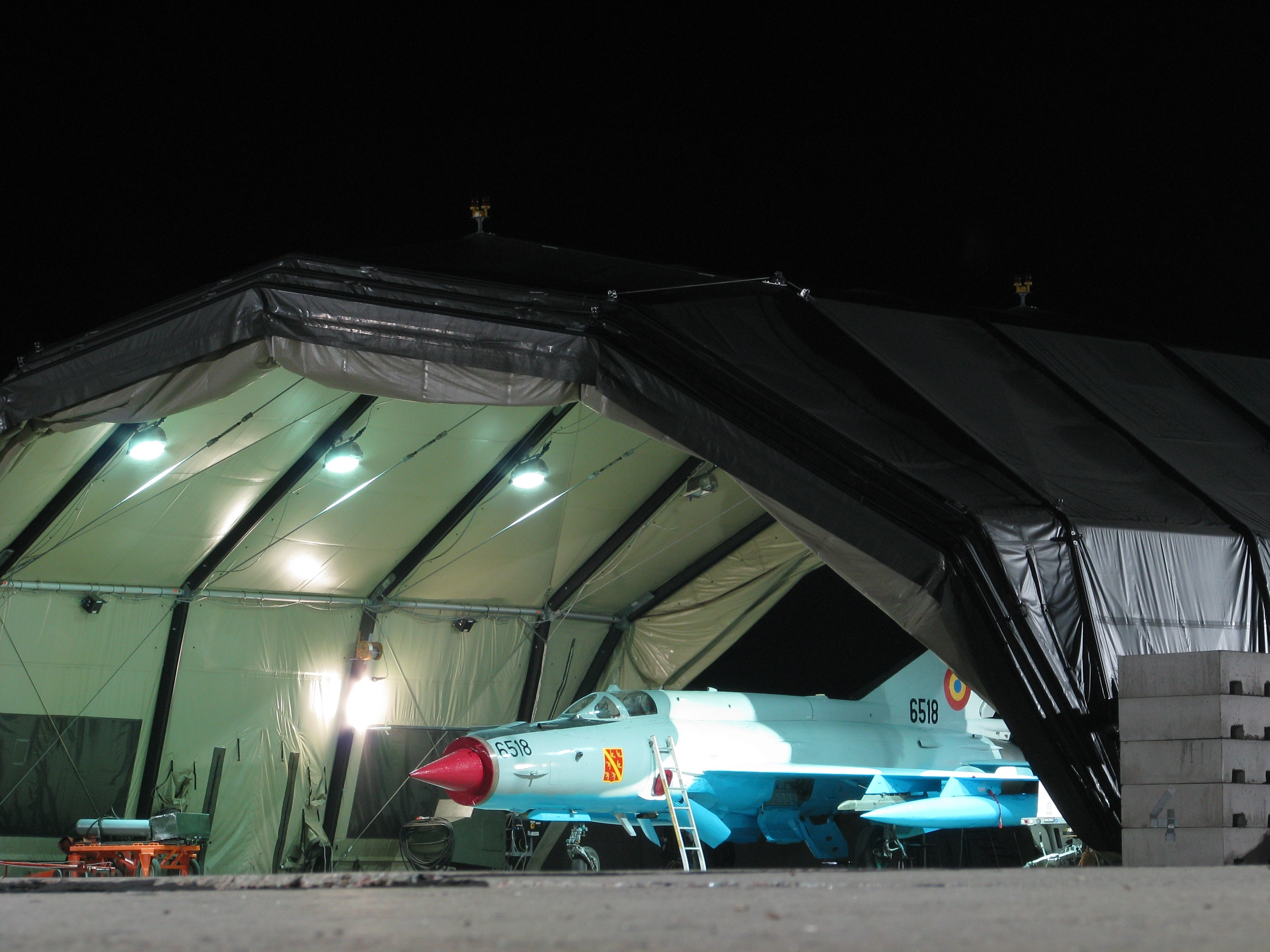
Romanian MiG-21 of the Baltica 07 Detachment ready for a night mission

=== Baltic Air Policing ===
Romania began participating in the Baltic Air Policing in August 2007 with the deployment of four MiG-21 LanceR Cs at Šiauliai Air Base in Lithuania. The Romanian detachment succeeded the French Air Force Mirage 2000Cs of Escadron de Chasse 01.012 from Cambrai. The aircraft and most of the staff came from the 71st Air Base. A total of 67 personnel, among them nine pilots, were part of the detachment: 63 served at Šiauliai, while other four served at the air traffic control centre in Kaunas. Once the RoAF finished its three-month stint, a Portuguese Air Force detachment took over the mission. The Romanian detachment attracted attention from the local media, not least from the fact that it was only the second time a Soviet-era jet fighter was deployed to Šiauliai (Polish Air Force MiG-29s had been deployed there first in 2006).

In November 2022, it was announced that Romanian F-16s were to participate in the Baltic Air Policing missions between April and July 2023. The Carpathian Vipers detachment formed by four F-16s and 100 servicemen primarily from the 53rd Fighter Squadron and led by Commander Cosmin Vlad was established 14 March 2023. The Romanian detachment was deployed together with a Portuguese detachment, taking over the Baltic Air Policing mission from the previous French and Polish detachments. The deployment ended on 31 July and was succeeded by a detachment of Italian Eurofighter Typhoons. Between April and July, the Romanian fighters intercepted over 60 Russian Air Force aircraft and participated in various multinational exercises totaling 600 fight hours.

The Carpathian Vipers detachment was deployed again in the Baltic Air Policing between April and August 2025. Working alongside the Polish Air Force Orlik contingent, the detachment totaled over 400 flight hours in operational missions as well as exercises such as Ramstein Alloy, Hedgehog, and BALTOPS. The two units were succeeded by Hungarian Gripens and Spanish Typhoons detachments. Starting in March 2026, the Carpathian Vipers detachment was deployed on the Baltica 2026 mission at Šiauliai with six F-16s. The detachment ended its 2026 deployment in August, accumulating over 800 flight hours in over 20 alpha scrambles and other operations.

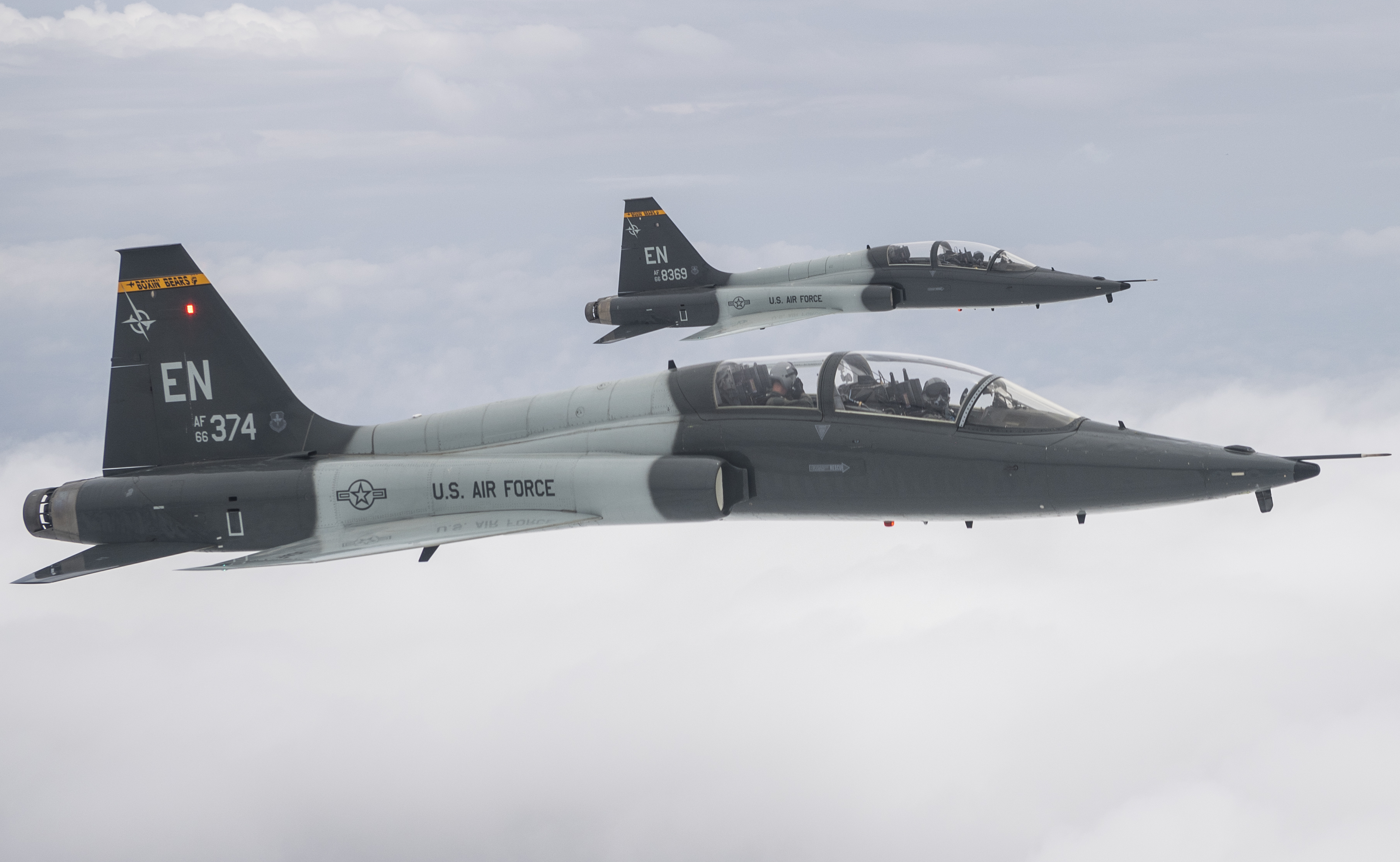
Romanian and American instructor pilots flying T-38Cs in formation

=== Euro-NATO Joint Jet Pilot Training ===
After previously stating the intent of joining the Euro-NATO Joint Jet Pilot Training Program (ENJJPT) in 2015, Romania became a member of the program in 2017. The first Romanian instructor was sent to the Sheppard Air Force Base in 2020. As of 2023, Romania had 15 pilots at the American base, of which nine instructor pilots. The Romanian instructors participate in the training of all partner nation pilots on the T-6A Texan II and T-38C Talon aircraft.

=== 2019–2020 mission to Mali ===
From October 2019 to November 2020, the Carpathian Pumas detachment of the 572nd Helicopter Squadron was deployed to Mali as part of MINUSMA. The detachment consisted of four IAR 330L helicopters and 120 personnel deployed on two rotations which took part in MEDEVAC, CASEVAC, troop and materiel transport, air patrol, and reconnaissance missions. By the end of the mission to Mali, the detachment flew over 380 missions, of which approximately 100 transport missions, 200 reconnaissance missions, and 18 medical missions during which more than 40 patients were evacuated. It operated in the UN sectors in the Mopti and Kidal regions.

One IAR 330 was damaged in August 2020. It was located at the Douentza base when the helicopter was overturned by a storm. No injuries occurred as a result of the accident.

== Structure ==
=== Air Force General Staff ===
The Romanian Air Force General Staff represents the military concept-developing, command and executive structure providing Air Forces peacetime, crisis and wartime leadership in order to reach, maintain and increase, as required, the operational level of the military subordinated structures so that to be able to operate under authorized commands responsible for military operations planning and conduct.

The main task is to generate, mobilize, structure, equip, operationalize and regenerate the required forces, provide the logistic support necessary to conduct military operations and based on higher orders, take over both the Air Component Command and independent air operations command and control, through the Air Operations Centre. Starting with 1 July 2010, the Romanian Air Force bases were renamed to Air Flotillas. The names were kept until 1 December 2013, when they were changed back to Air Bases.

=== Units ===
Romanian Air Force locations
Fighter base Helicopters Other flying units
AN/FPS-117(V) Radar station Air Component Command Air Signals and IT Centre

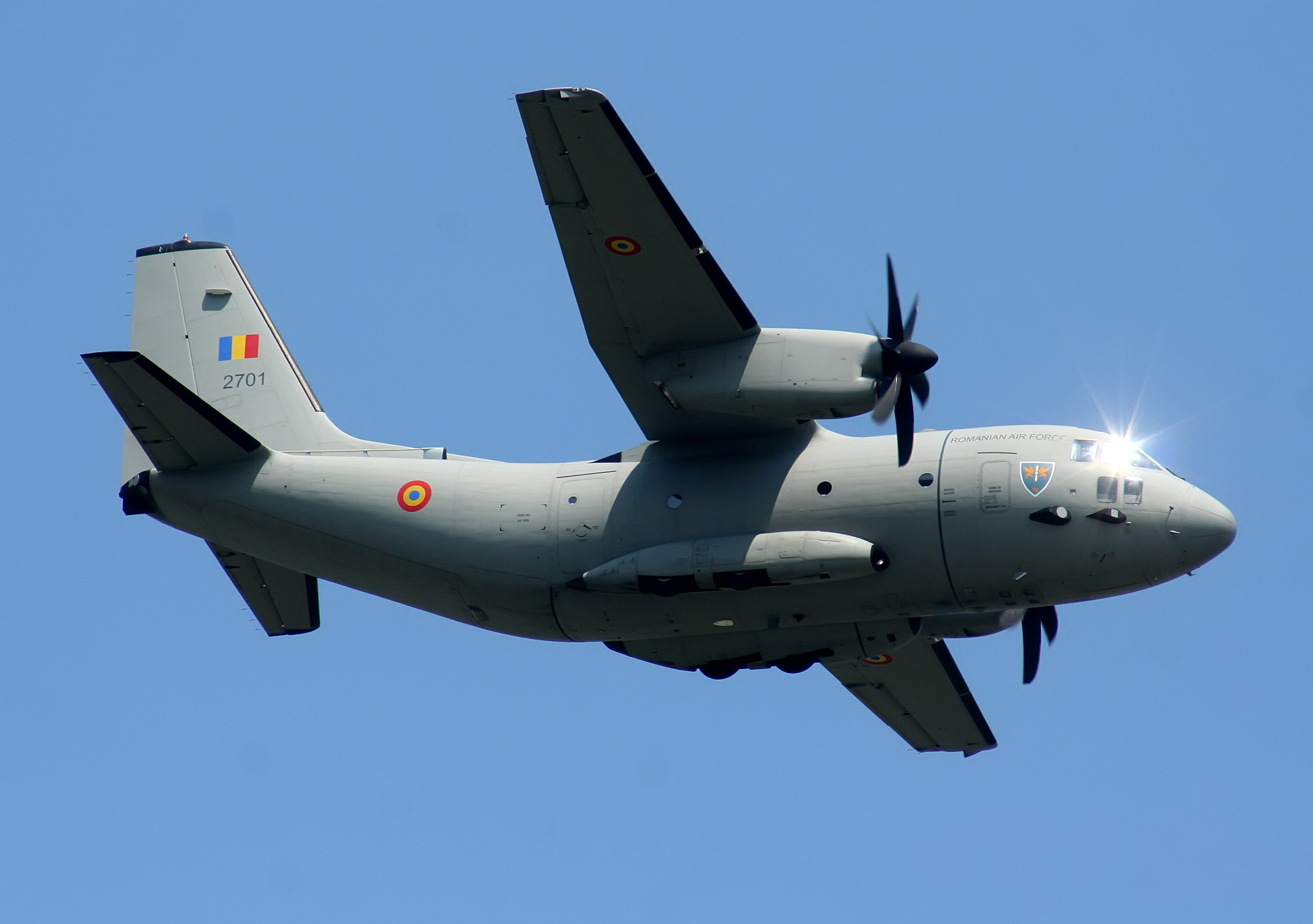
Alenia C-27J Spartan RoAF 90th Airlift Base

The current structure of the Romanian Air Force is as follows:

- 57th Air Base "Căpitan Aviator Constantin Cantacuzino"
  - 57th Air Base Command, at Constanța – Mihail Kogălniceanu IAP
    - 57th Air Operations Center
    - 57th Operational Group
      - 572nd Helicopter Squadron, with IAR 330 L-RM (MEDEVAC)
    - 57th Force Protection Group
      - Anti-Aircraft Artillery Battalion
      - 578th Military Police Company
    - 57th Support Group
      - 573rd Cargo and Personnel Processing Company
      - Transport Company
- 71st Air Base "General Emanoil Ionescu"
  - 71st Air Base Command, Câmpia Turzii military airfield
    - 71st Air Operations Center
    - 71st Operational Group
      - 48th Fighter Squadron, with F-16AM/BM MLU
      - 58th Fighter Squadron, with F-16AM/BM MLU
      - 713th Combat Helicopter Squadron, with IAR 330 SOCAT
      - 71st Air Base annex, at Timișoara – Giarmata IAP
        - 712th Helicopter Squadron, with IAR 330L/M (MEDEVAC)
    - 71st Force Protection Group
      - 715th Anti-Aircraft Artillery Battalion
      - 717th Military Police Company
    - 71st Support Group
      - 716th Air Communications and Air Navigation Technical Systems Company
      - Service Platoon
- 86th Air Base "Locotenent Aviator Gheorghe Mociorniță"
  - 86th Air Base Command, in Fetești – Borcea military airfield
    - 86th Air Operations Center
    - 86th Operational Group
      - 53rd Fighter Squadron, with F-16AM/BM MLU
      - European F-16 Training Center Squadron, with F-16AM/BM MLU
    - 86th Force Protection Group
      - 864th Anti-Aircraft Artillery Battalion
      - 866th Military Police Company
    - 86th Support Group
      - Air Communications and Air Navigation Technical Systems Company
      - Transport Company
      - Service Platoon
- 90th Airlift Base "Comandor Aviator Gheorghe Bănciulescu"
  - 90th Airlift Base Command, at Bucharest – Otopeni IAP
    - 90th Air Operations Center
    - 90th Operational Group
      - 901st Strategic Airlift Squadron, with C-130B/H Hercules
      - 902nd Airlift and Aerophotogrammetry Squadron, with C-27J Spartan, An-26 and An-30
      - 903rd Transport Helicopter Squadron, with IAR 330L/M
    - 90th Force Protection Group
      - 905th Anti-Aircraft Artillery Battalion
      - Military Police Company
    - Logistic Support Group
    - 90th Support Group
      - 908th Infrastructure Company
      - Communications and Information Technology Company
      - Engineer Company
      - Transport Company
      - Service Platoon
- 95th Air Base "Erou Căpitan Aviator Alexandru Șerbănescu"
  - 95th Air Base Command, at Bacău IAP
    - 95th Air Operations Center
    - 95th Operational Group
      - 951st Advanced Air Training Squadron, with IAR 99 Șoim
      - 952nd Combat Helicopter Squadron, with IAR 330 SOCAT
    - 95th Force Protection Group
      - 954th Anti-Aircraft Artillery Battalion
      - 956th Military Police Company
      - 958th CBRN Defence Platoon
    - 95th Support Group
      - 955th Air Communications and Air Navigation Technical Systems Company
      - 957th Infrastructure Company
      - Engineer Company
      - Transport Company
      - Service Platoon

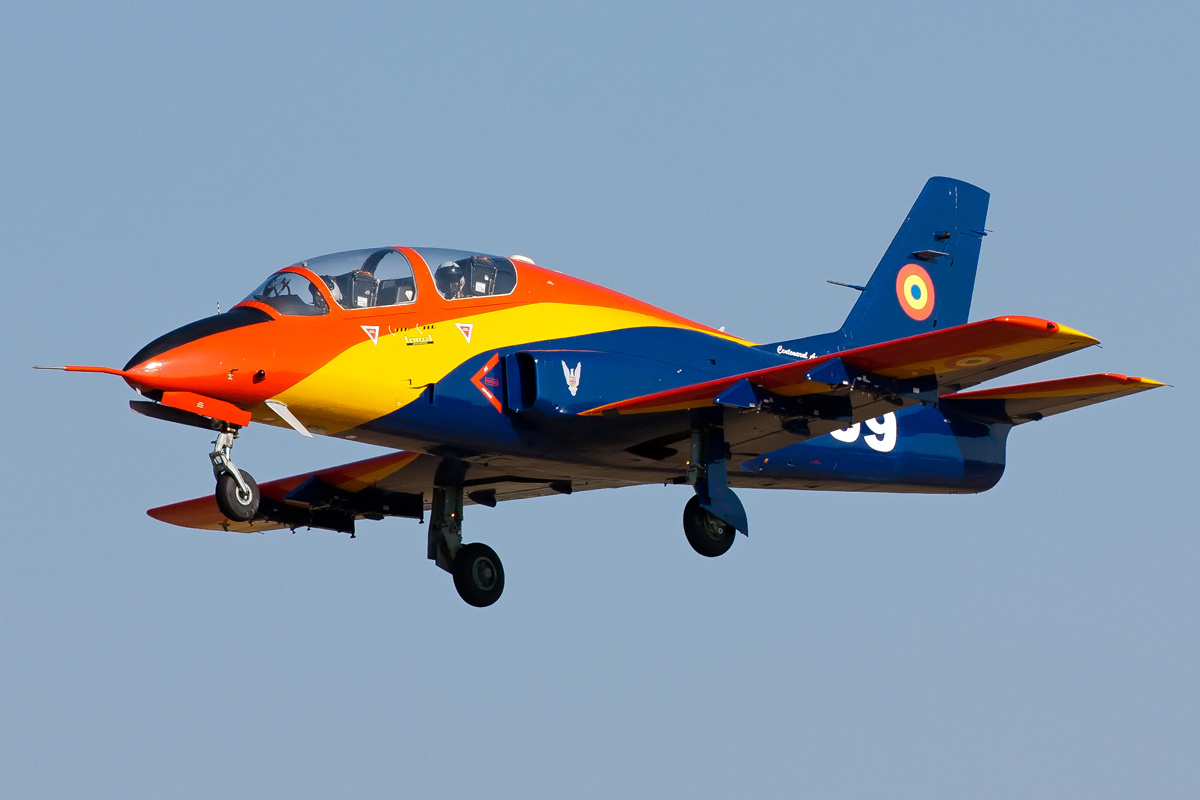
A IAR 99 Șoim in 100th anniversary of aviation colours

- 70th Aviation Engineer Regiment "General-maior Gheorghe Teodorescu", in Pantelimon
  - 1st Engineer Battalion
  - 2nd Engineer Battalion
  - Air Force EOD Group
  - Force Protection Company
  - Logistic Support Company
- 85th Air Signals and IT Centre "General Doroftei Ghermănescu", in Bucharest
  - 2nd Air Communications Company
  - Air Force Mobile Communications and Information Support Center
  - Deployable Communications and Information Technology Module (MCID)
  - Logistic Support Company
- 74th Patriot Regiment, in Mihai Bravu
  - 1st Battalion
  - Support Battalion
- 1st Surface-to-air Missile Brigade "General Nicolae Dăscălescu", in Chitila
  - 111th Surface-to-air Missile Battalion "Voievodul Mihai", in Boteni
  - 112th Surface-to-air Missile Battalion, in Bucșani
  - 113th Surface-to-air Missile Battalion "Codrii Vlăsiei", in Ghimpați
  - 114th Surface-to-air Missile Battalion "Șoimii Bărăganului", in Adâncata
  - 5th Surface-to-air Missile Battalion "Horea", in Vâlcele
  - 7th Hawk Battalion
  - 8th Technical Battalion
  - 12th Support Group
    - Support Company
  - Force Protection Group
- 76th Intelligence, Surveillance and Reconnaissance Brigade "Dacia", in Moara Vlăsiei
  - 1st Airspace Surveillance Group "General Neculai Iordache", at 86th Air Base, in Fetești
    - 102nd Radiolocation Company, in Schitu
    - 105th Radiolocation Company, in Sulina
    - 107th Radiolocation Company
    - 109th Radiolocation Company
  - 2nd Airspace Surveillance Group "General Pompiliu Ionescu", at 95th Air Base, in Bacău
    - 201st Radiolocation Company, in Bacău
    - 204th Radiolocation Company, in Matca
    - 205th Radiolocation Company
    - 206th Radiolocation Company, in Miroslava
    - 207th Radiolocation Company, in Ionășeni
  - 3rd Airspace Surveillance Group "General Vasile Mihalache", at 71st Air Base, in Câmpia Turzii
    - 302nd Radiolocation Company, in Odorheiu Secuiesc
    - 304th Radiolocation Company, in Tășnad
    - 305th Radiolocation Company, in Șepreuș
  - 4th Electronic Warfare Group "Locotenent-colonel Mihai Cană", in Domnești
  - Cyberspace Intelligence Collection Center CYBERINT
  - Operations, Air Surveillance and Electronic Warfare Center
  - Operational Center
  - Support Group
- 91st Logistic Base "General Aviator Andrei Popovici", in Otopeni
  - 91st Logistic Support Group, in Târgșoru Nou
  - 917th Armament and Ammunition Depot, in Verneşti
  - 918th Armament and Ammunition Depot, in Mediaș
  - 920th Fuel-Lubricants Depot, in Cristian
  - Regional Maintenance Center, in Otopeni
- 51st Infrastructure, Troop Housing and Barracks Administration Center, in Pantelimon
- 210th Support Group "General de divizie Ioan Macri", in Bucharest
  - Transport and Service Company
- Air Component Command "General comandant aviator Ermil Gheorghiu", in Balotești
  - Air Operations Centre, in Balotești, reports to the NATO Integrated Air Defense System CAOC Torrejón
    - Radiolocation Company, in Ovidiu, with AN/FPS-117(V)
    - Radiolocation Company, at Giarmata with AN/FPS-117(V)
    - 208th Radiolocation Company, in Suceava (Dumbrăveni), with AN/FPS-117(V)
    - 110th Radiolocation Company, in Craiova (Cârcea), with AN/FPS-117(V)
    - Radiolocation Company, on Muntele Mare, with AN/FPS-117(V)
  - Cyber Defence Operational Center
  - Communications and Information Technology Center
  - Operational Meteorological Center
  - Logistic Support and Force Protection Group
    - Logistic Support Company
    - Military Police Company
- Air Force Academy "Henri Coandă", in Brașov
- Air Force Personnel Training and Formation Air Base
  - Air Operations Center
  - Air Force Application School "Aurel Vlaicu", Boboc military airfield
    - Aviation Training Group
      - 1st Air Training Squadron AI-A Phase, with Iak-52 and IAR 316B
      - 2nd Air Training Squadron AII-A Phase, with IAR 99 Standard
  - Air Force NCO and Specialists School "Traian Vuia", Boboc military airfield
  - Operational Center
  - Force Protection Group
    - Anti-Aircraft Artillery Battalion
    - Military Police Company
  - Support Group
    - Air Communications and Air Navigation Technical Systems Company
    - Transport Company
- Air Force Simulation Training Center, Boboc military airfield
- Combat Search and Rescue Detachment (DCSL)
- Military College "Mihai Viteazul", in Alba Iulia
- National Museum of Romanian Aviation

=== Reserve air bases ===
- 93rd Air Base, at Giarmata Airport

=== Capu Midia Training Range ===
The Capu Midia Surface-to-air Training and Air-to-Surface Shooting Range, officially named the Air Defense Training School "Brigadier General Ion Bungescu", provides firing training, execution and evaluation facilities. It is located in Constanța County, 20 kilometres (12 mi) north of the city of, Constanța.

Air Defense Training School "Brigadier General Ion Bungescu"

- Force Protection Battalion
  - Military Police Company
- Logistics Company

== Equipment ==
=== Aircraft ===
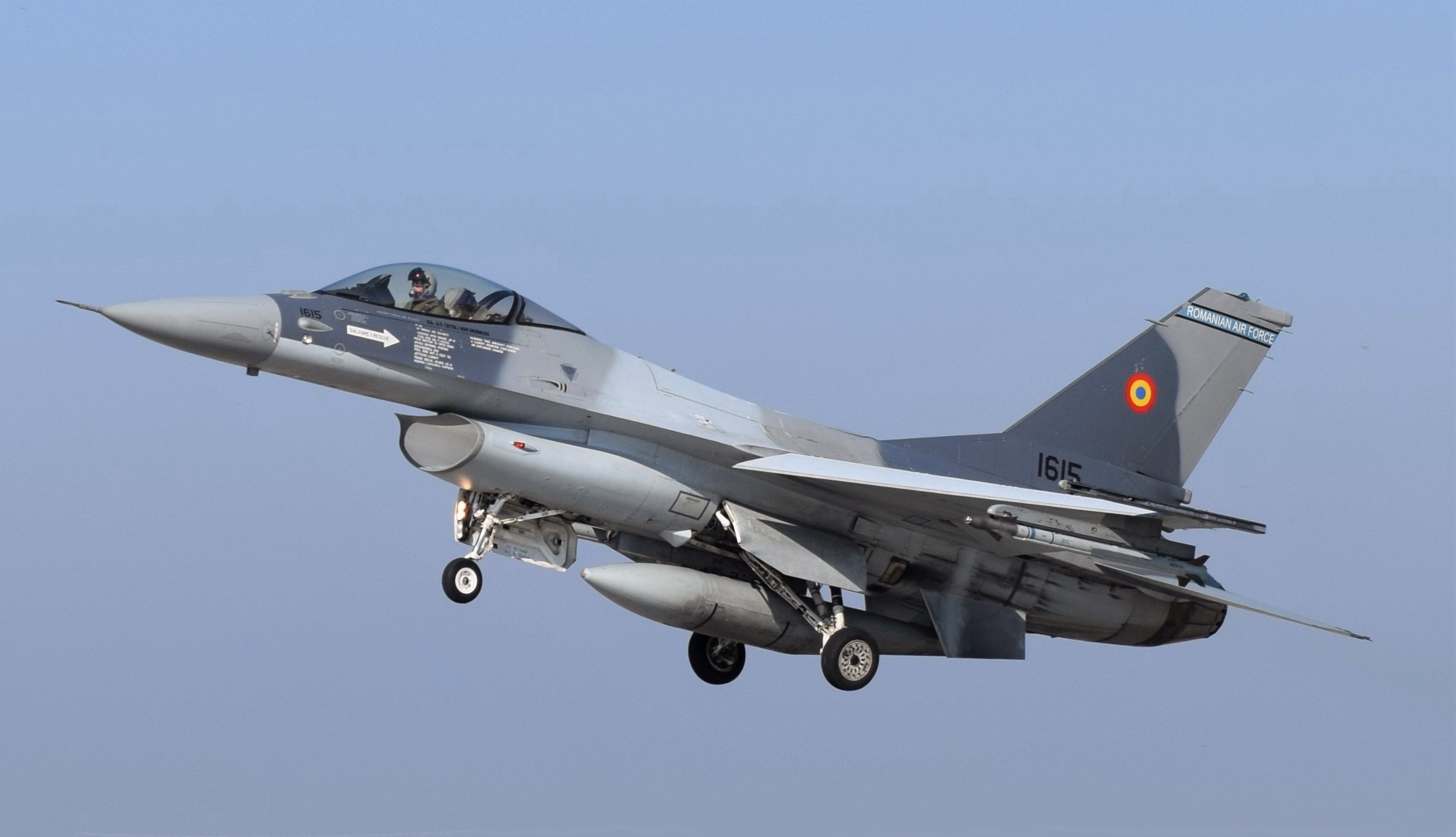
An F-16AM lands at Borcea Air Base

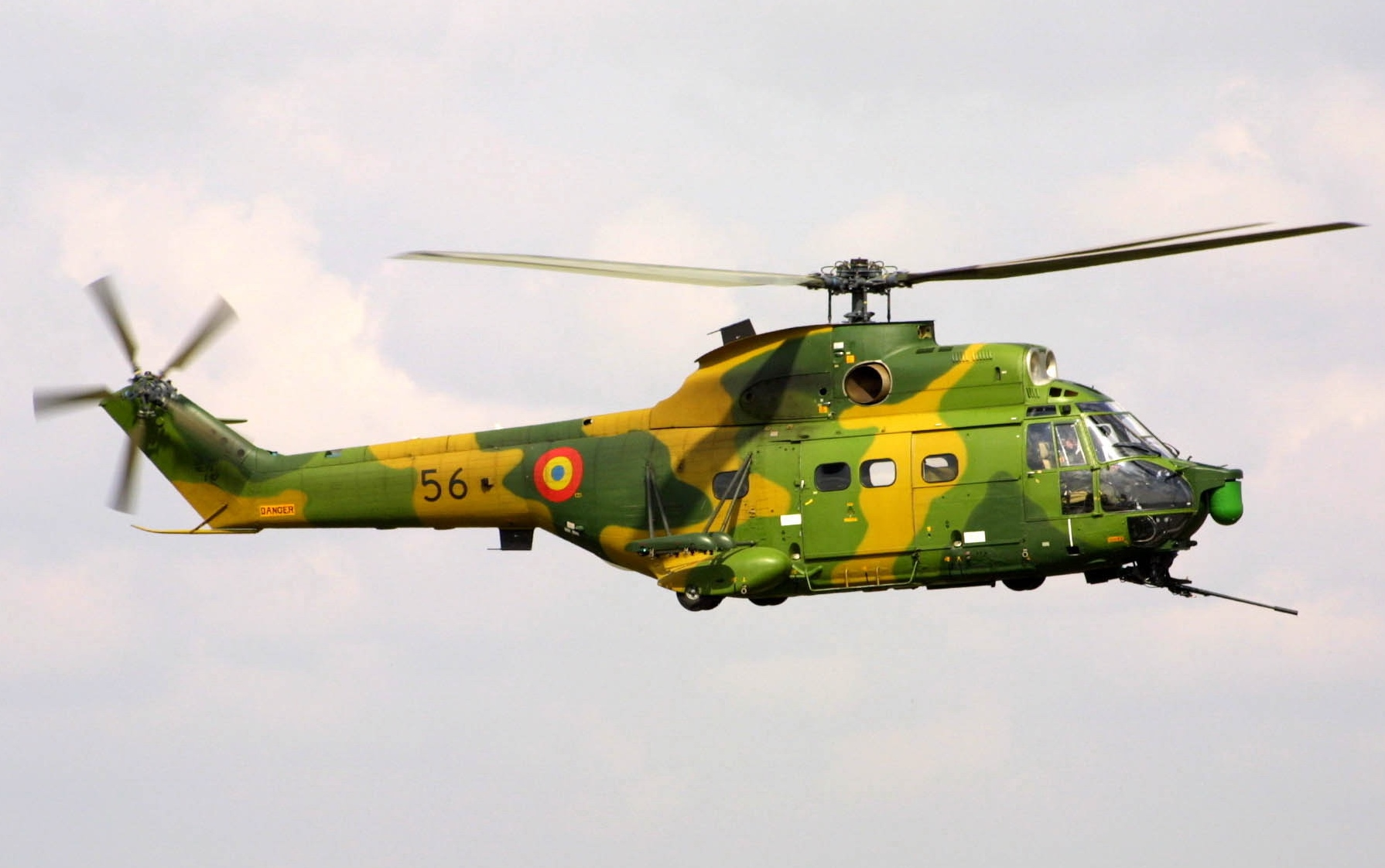
Romanian Air Force IAR 330 SOCAT

| Aircraft | Origin | Type | Variant | In service | Notes |
Combat aircraft
| F-16 Fighting Falcon | United States | Multirole | F-16AM/BM | 64 / 67 | 3 surplus Norwegian units to be delivered. 24 used for conversion training. 6 additional aircraft used for ground training. |
| F-35 Lightning II | United States | Multirole | F-35A | 0 | 32 on order. |
Reconnaissance
| Antonov An-30 | Soviet Union | Surveillance | | 2 | |
Transport
| Antonov An-26 | Soviet Union | Transport | | 1 | |
| C-27J Spartan | Italy | Transport | | 7 | |
| C-130 Hercules | United States | Tactical airlifter | C-130B/H | 9 | 4 are C-130B, 5 are C-130H |
Helicopters
| Airbus H175 | France | Utility | H175M | 0 | 6 on order. Purchased through the Security Action for Europe program. |
| Airbus H225 | France | Attack | H225M | 0 | 12 on order. Purchased through SAFE. |
| IAR 330 | Romania | Utility / Transport | | 56 | 22 SOCAT used in a gunship role |
Trainer aircraft
| IAR 99 | Romania | Jet trainer | IAR 99C/SM | 21 | 11 are IAR 99C, 10 IAR 99SM on order (2 delivered by 2026) |
| IAR 316 | Romania | Trainer / Utility | | 7 | Licensed built SA316B |
| Yakovlev Yak-52 | Romania | Trainer | | 14 | |

Note: Three C-17 Globemaster III and five RQ-4D are available through the Strategic Airlift Capability, and Alliance Ground Surveillance programs

=== Air defense ===
The Romanian Air Force also has several anti-aircraft systems:

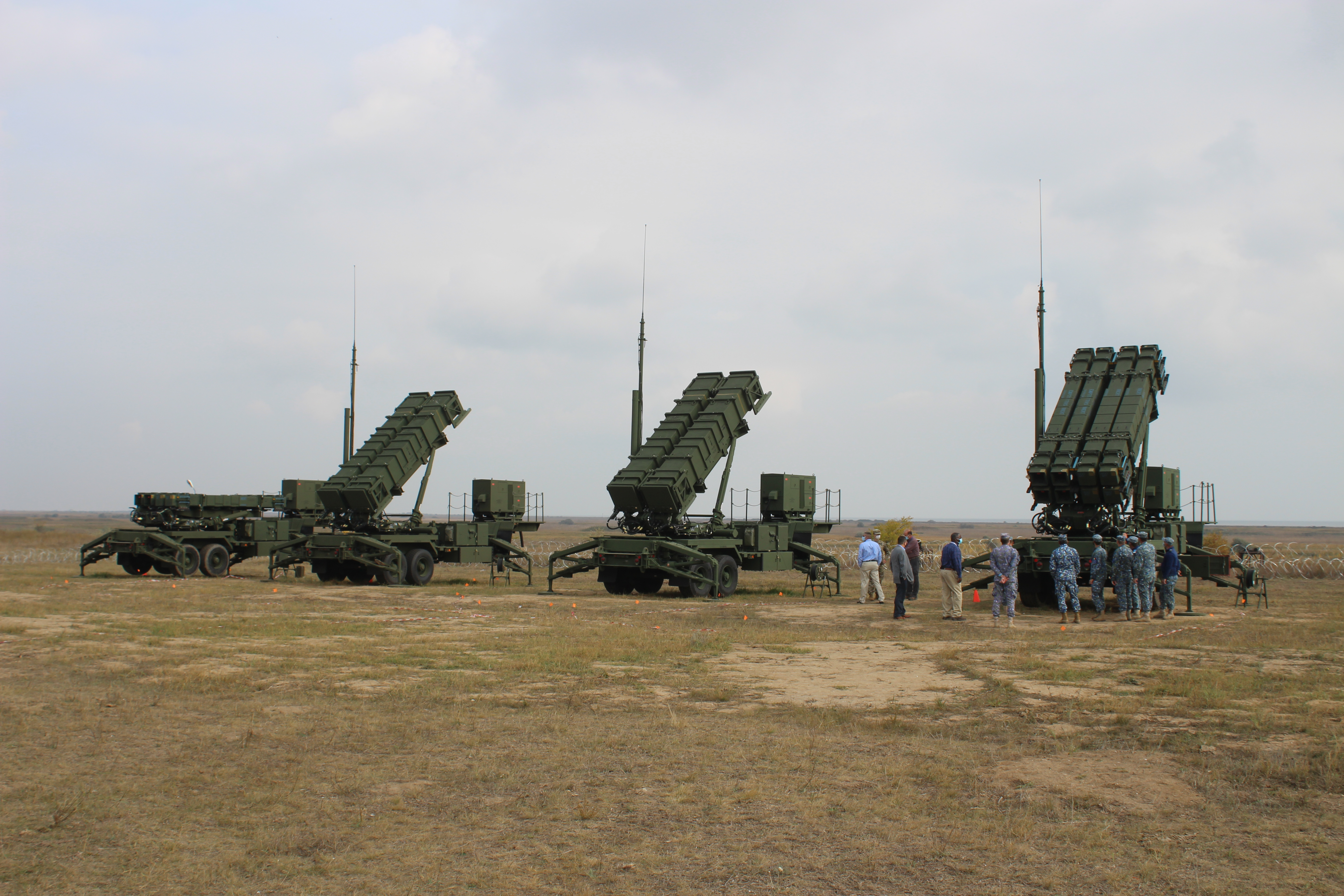
The first Romanian MIM-104 Patriot battery, 29 October 2020

| Name | Origin | Type | In service | Notes |
SAM
| MIM-104 Patriot | United States | SAM/ABM system | 3 batteries | 1 battery on order to replace the system donated to Ukraine. |
| MIM-23 Hawk | United States | SAM system | 8 batteries | |
| IRIS-T SL | Germany | SAM system | 0 | 3 systems on order. Purchased through SAFE. |
| SPYDER | Israel | SHORAD/VSHORAD | 0 | 6 integrated systems on order. |
Air defence
| S-60 57mm | Soviet Union | Mobile anti-aircraft | | Towed gun |
| Skynex | Italy | C-RAM and C-UAS | 0 | 7 systems purchased through SAFE. Will replace the S-60 guns in service with the Anti-Aircraft Artillery Battalions. |
Radars
| P-14 | Soviet Union | Radar | | 2D VHF radar |
| P-18 | Soviet Union | Radar | | 2-dimensional air search radar |
| P-37 (radar) | Soviet Union | Radar | | E band/F band 2D radar |
| PRV-13 | Soviet Union | Radar | | Radar altimeter |
| AN/TPS-79(R) | United States | 3D radar | 19 | Medium range 3D radar. Co-produced in Romania |
| AN/FPS-117 | United States | 3D radar | (5) FPS-117 / (7) TPS-77 | Long-range 3D radar |
| GM200 MM/A | France | 3D radar | 0 | 12 radars on order. Purchased through SAFE. To be partially produced in Romania. |

Note: Additionally, five WSR-98D radars owned by the National Meteorological Administration are used for both civilian and military purposes

== Aircraft markings ==
The Romanian roundel uses the colours of the Romanian flag. It is used on Romanian Armed Forces vehicles and Romanian Air Force aircraft.

Roundel used for aircraft and vehicles from 1912 to 1941, 1944 to 1950 and since 1984

Roundel used during WWI. French markings were overpainted with yellow to match the Romanian national colors.

Roundel seen in 1916, appearing on some aircraft.

Marking used by Romanian Royal Air Force, and Romanian Royal Army from 1 May 1941 to 3 September 1944

Romanian Roundel used from 1949 to 1984

== Ranks and insignia ==
Officers

| NATO code | OF-10 | OF-9 | OF-8 | OF-7 | OF-6 | OF-5 | OF-4 | OF-3 | OF-2 | OF-1 |
|---|---|---|---|---|---|---|---|---|---|---|---|
| Romanian Air Force |
| Romanian Air Force | Mareșal | General | General-locotenent | General-maior | General de flotilă aeriană | Comandor | Căpitan-comandor | Locotenent-comandor | Căpitan | Locotenent | Sublocotenent |

Enlisted/Non-commissioned officers

| NATO code | OR-9 | | OR-8 | OR-7 | OR-6 | OR-5 | OR-4 | | | OR-3 | OR-2 | OR-1 |
|---|---|---|---|---|---|---|---|---|---|---|---|---|
| Romanian Air Force |
| Romanian Air Force | Plutonier adjutant principal | Plutonier adjutant | Plutonier-major | Plutonier | Sergent-major | Sergent | Caporal clasa I | Caporal clasa a II-a | Caporal clasa a III-a | Fruntaș | Soldat |

Aviator badges

The first aviator badges of Romania were issued in 1912. The current pilot badges were introduced in 1996 and use the same style as the World War I and World War II badges.

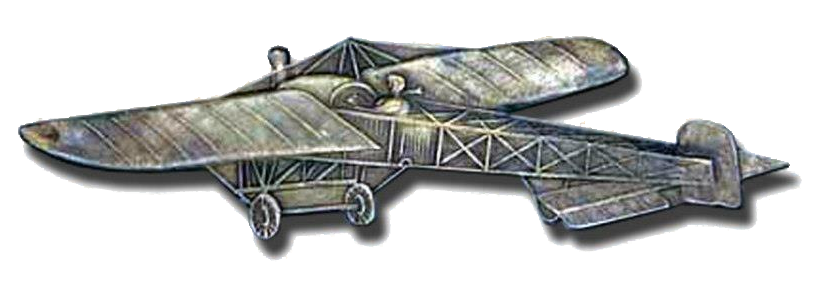
Model 1912 badge

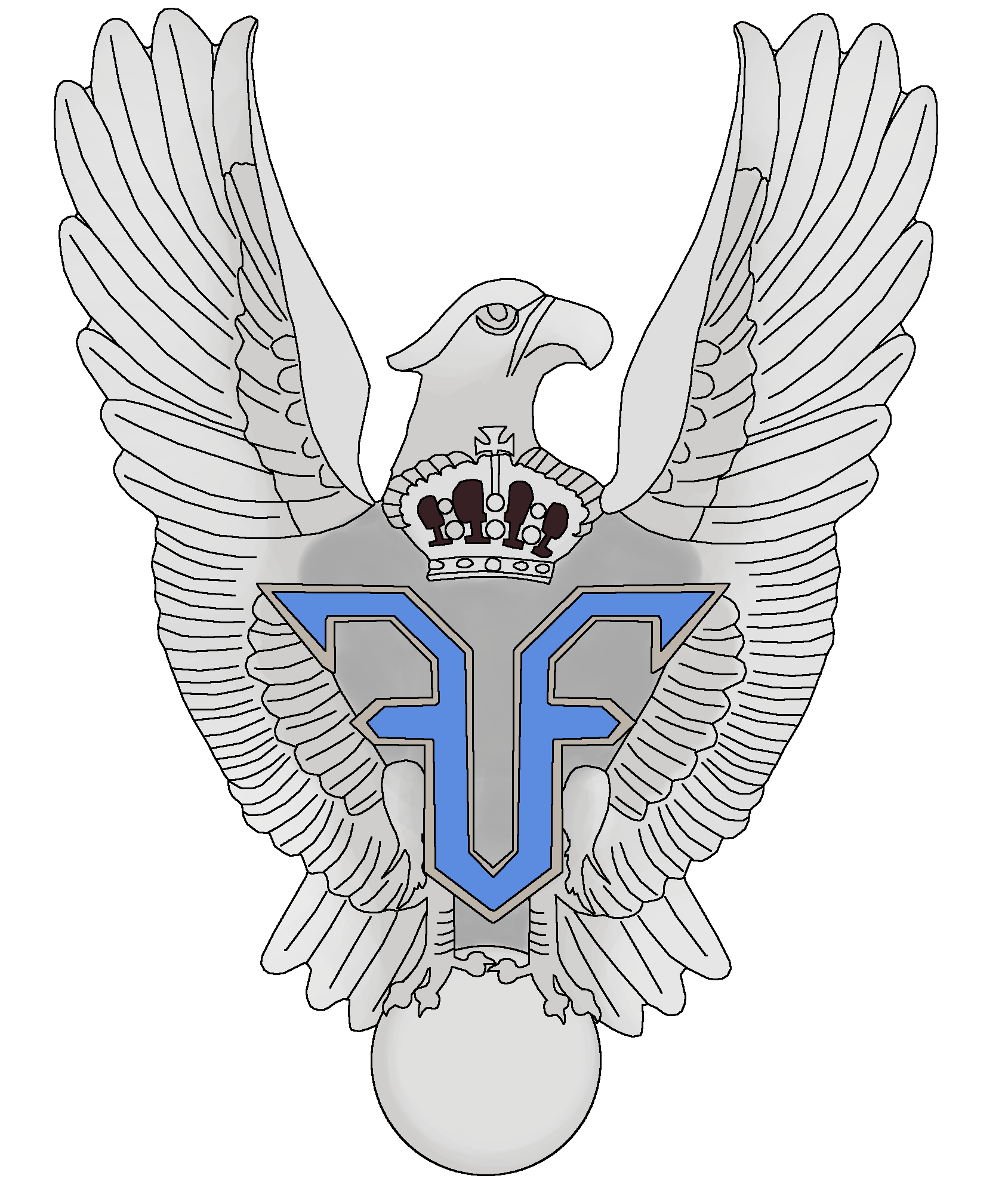
Model 1915 pilot badge

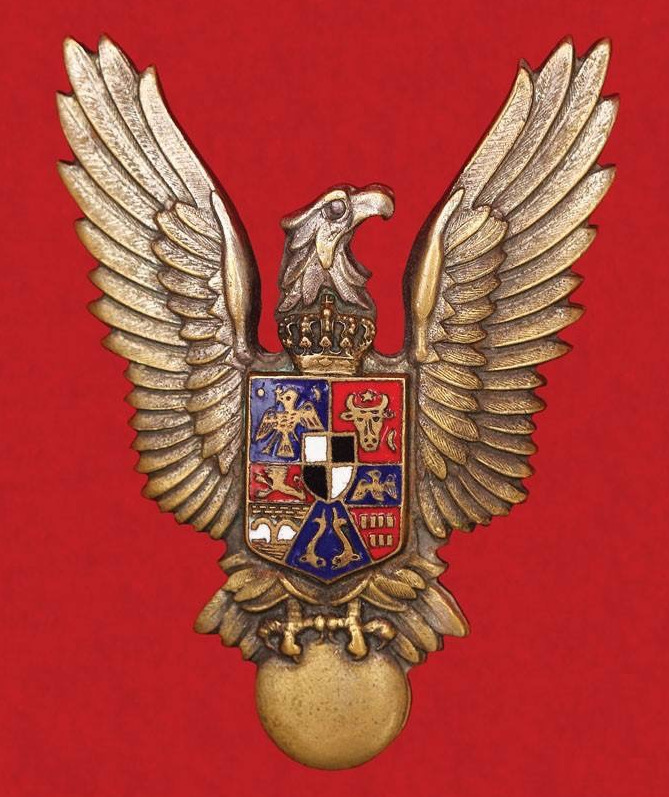
Model 1941 pilot badge

Current pilot badge

== See also ==
- Aviation in Romania
- Monument to the Heroes of the Air
- General Inspectorate of Aviation, air component of the Ministry of Internal Affairs
- Romanian Naval Aviation, air component of the Romanian Naval Forces
- Romavia, former airline of the Ministry of National Defense
