= Bucharest Airport (disambiguation) =

Henri Coandă International Airport is the main airport serving Bucharest, Romania.

Bucharest Airport may also refer to:

- Aurel Vlaicu International Airport serving Bucharest, Romania - located in the district of Băneasa
- Bucharest Alexeni Airport, a project for a new airport aiming to serve low-cost airlines
