= Craiova Air Base =

- Baza Aeriană Craiova
- Craiova, Dolj County, Romania
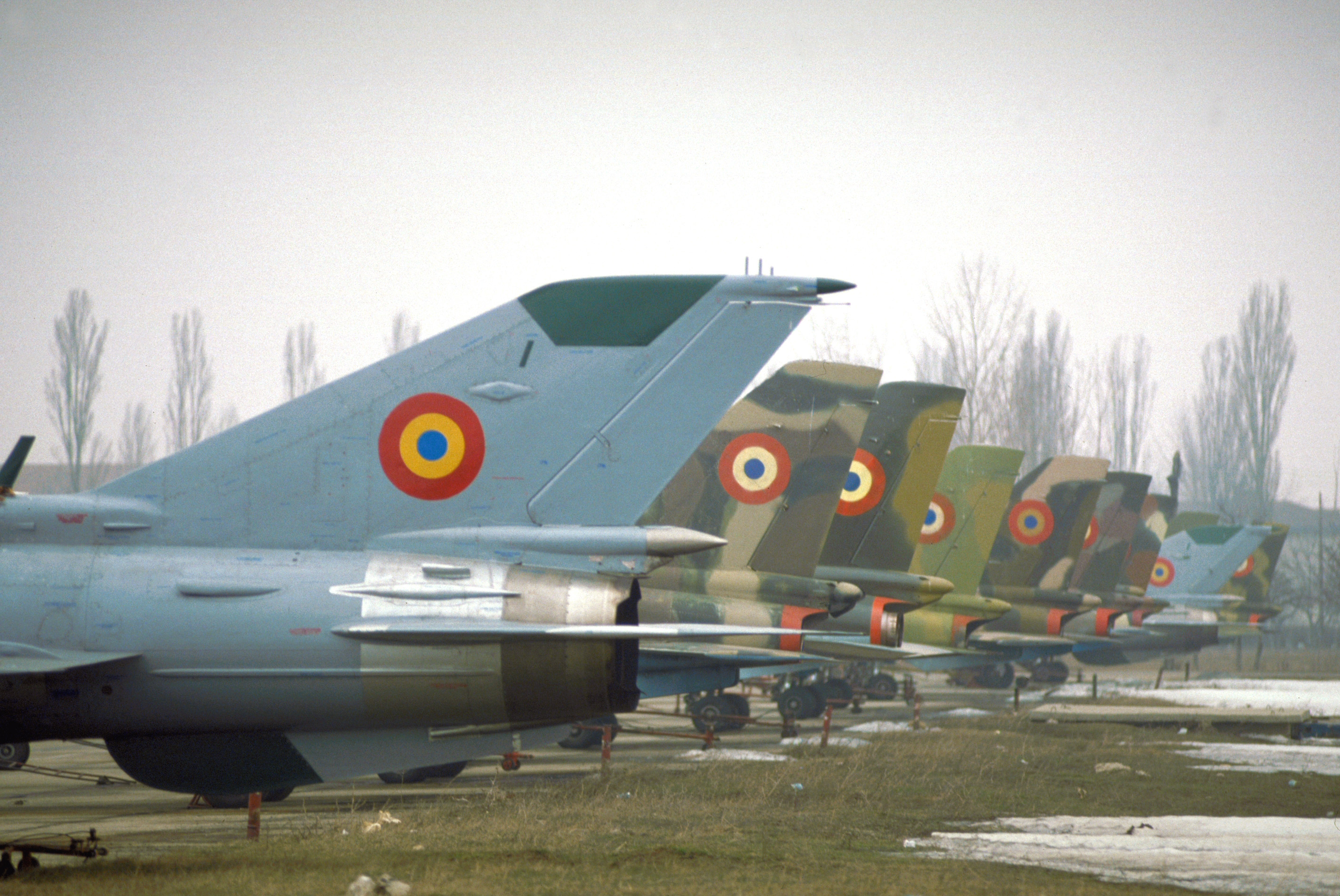
- Retired MiG-21 and IAR-93 aircraft

Site information
- Controlled by: Romanian Air Force

Location
- Coordinates: 44°19′05″N 023°53′19″E

Site history
- Built: 1938
- In use: 1940–2004

Airfield information
- Identifiers: IATA: CRA, ICAO: LRCV
- Elevation: 191 metres (627 ft) AMSL
Runways
Direction	Length and surface
09/27	2,500 metres (8,200 ft) Asphalt

The Craiova Air Base, also known as the 67th Air Base, was an air base of the Romanian Air Force located in Craiova at the Craiova International Airport. It functioned as a military base from 1940, last being organized as the 67th Advanced Operational Training and Flight Test until 2004. The 322nd Aviation Maintenance Centre also functioned at the base between 1970 and 2004.

Currently, the military base of the Craiova Airport works as the Center for Research, Innovation and Flight Tests (Centrul de cercetare, inovare și încercări în zbor).

== History ==
=== 1914–1945 ===
In 1914, the Ministry of War gave the order to the Aviation Command to survey and identify locations where reserve aerodromes could be set up. One of the surveyed locations was Craiova, where an aerodrome was set up in 1916 on the Craiova Hippodrome. During the war, various missions were flown with Farman aircraft from this aerodrome.

In 1938, King Carol II issued a decree for the establishment of an airport near Craiova. The new airport was to serve both a public role and a military one during an eventual war. During the war, it was the headquarters of the 3rd Bomber Flotilla. In 1942, the 3rd Light Bomber Group was formed within the Flotilla. The Group consisted of the 73rd Squadron (equipped with PZL.23 Karaś) and the 74th Squadron (equipped with Potez 63), and the 81st Squadron (equipped with IAR 37) which remained stationed at Buzău. The Group participated in the campaign on the Eastern Front in Ukraine, being equipped with Junkers Ju 87 dive bombers and renamed to the 3rd Dive Bomber Group. In 1944, the Group was deployed to the front in Moldavia, in the Iași area. After the 23 August coup d'état, the 3rd Group was relocated to Ianca, then returned to Craiova and merged with the 6th Dive Bomber Group.

=== 1948–2004 ===
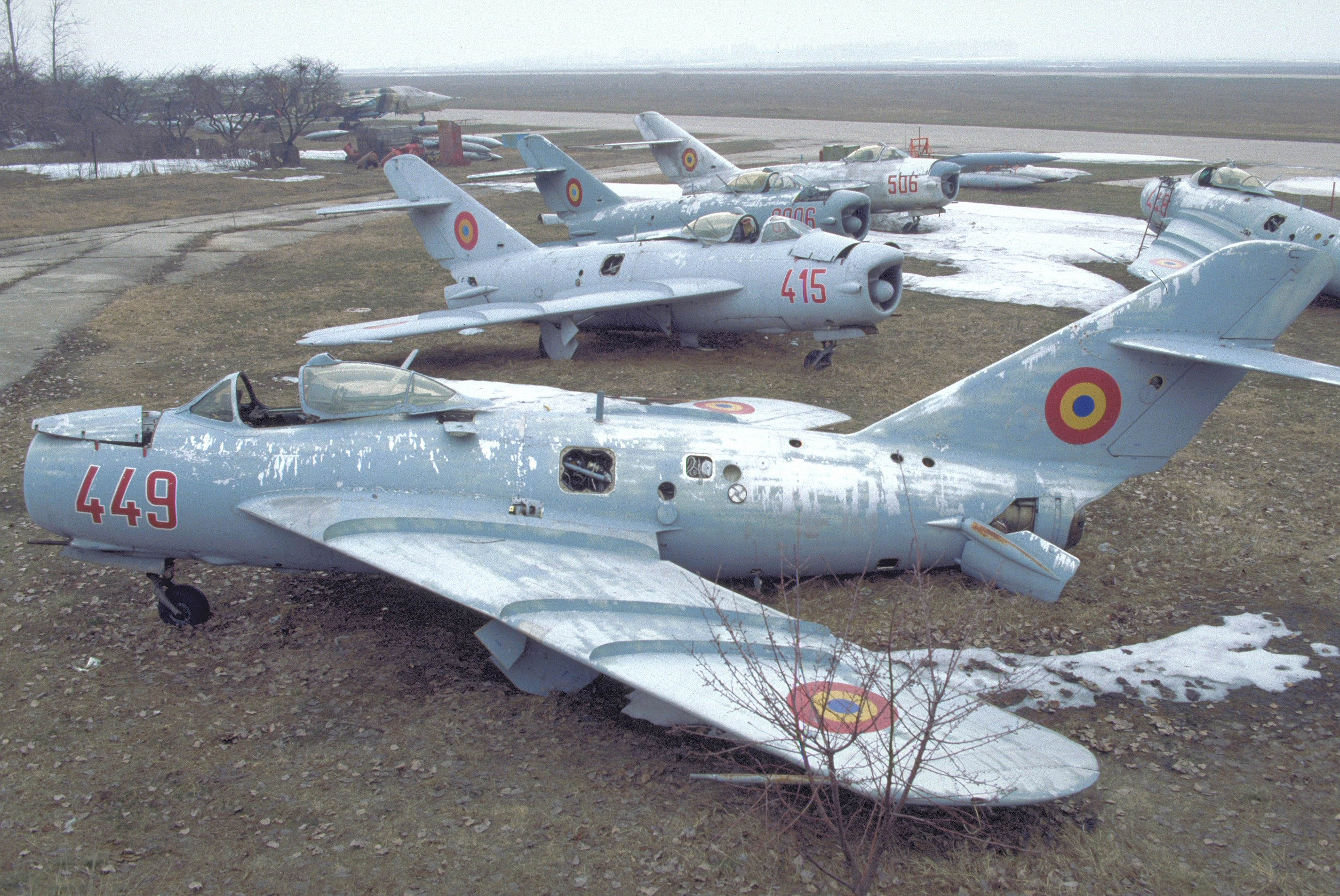
Retired MiG-17PF fighters in 1996

In 1948, the 2nd Fighter Group was moved to the base, being renamed the 2nd Aviation Regiment a year later. The Regiment was equipped with Messerschmitt Bf 109G, IAR 80, and IAR 81 fighters. Between 1950 and 1952, a concrete runway was constructed at the base. In 1952, the 158th Jet Fighter Aviation Regiment was moved to Craiova from Clinceni, and was equipped with Soviet MiG-15 fighters. The 158th Regiment was renamed to the 67th Fighter Aviation Regiment in 1959, being equipped with MiG-17F and PF fighters. From 1979, the Regiment began being equipped with IAR 93 aircraft, and by 1989, the 67th Fighter-Bomber Regiment had two squadrons of IAR 93s.

After the retirement of the MiG-15 and MiG-17 fighters, the unit was equipped with MiG-21s. Around the mid-1990s, the Regiment was also renamed to the 67th Air Base following the restructuring of the Romanian Air Force. After persistent problems and the civil wars in Yugoslavia, production of the IAR 93 was stopped and the aircraft was retired in 1998. The IAR 93 was replaced with IAR 99s transferred from Ianca.

The air base functioned until 2001, being transformed into the "67th Advanced Operational Training and Flight Test Center", and was eventually disbanded in 2003. The 322nd Aviation Maintenance Centre, which was established in 1970, was disbanded in 2004.

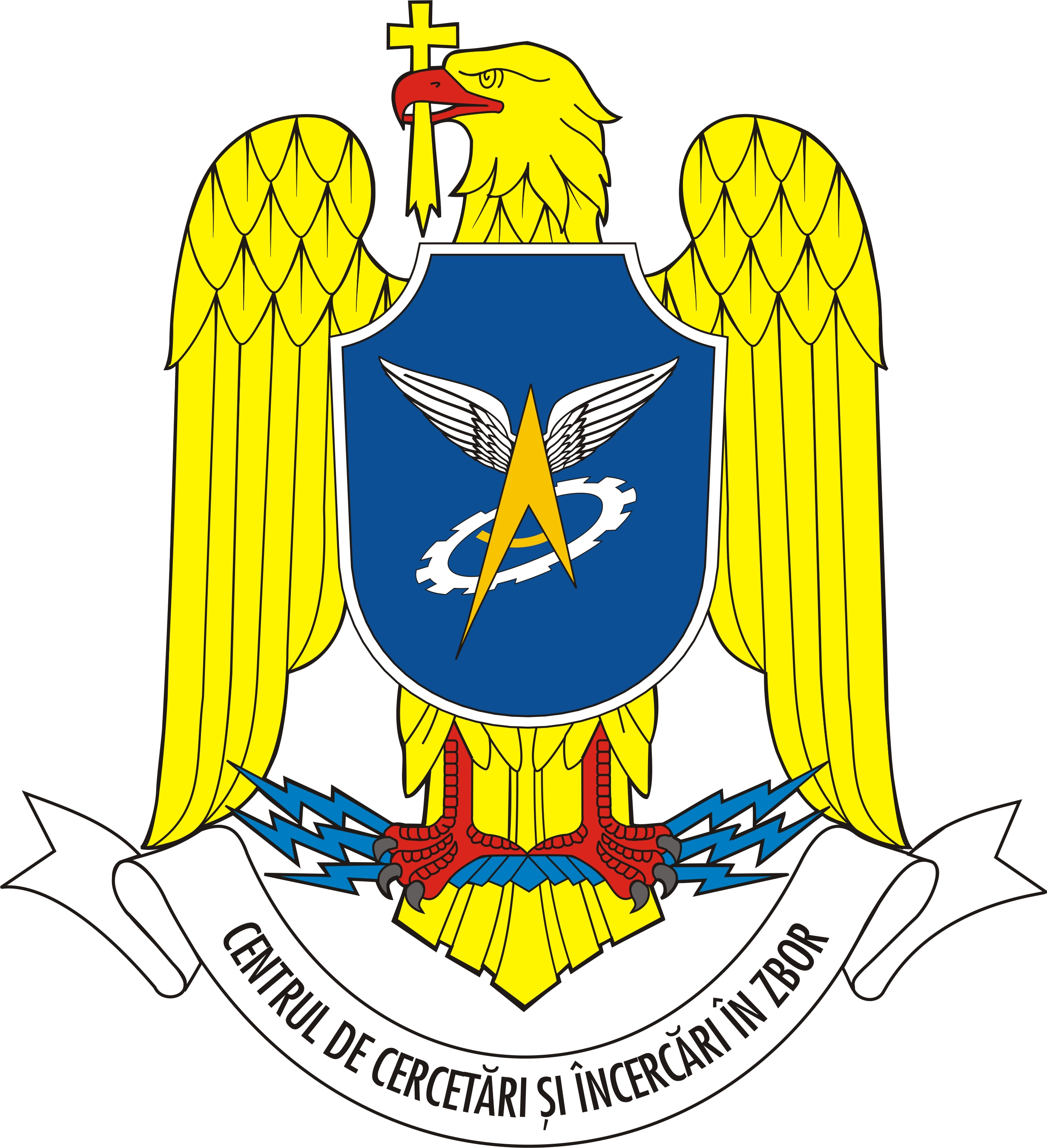
Coat of Arms of CCIIZ

== Center for Research, Innovation and Flight Tests ==
Founded in 1974 as the Flight Test Center, the research center worked together with Avioane Craiova on the IAR 93 and IAR 99 projects. In 1994, the center changed its name to the current "Center for Research, Innovation and Flight Tests" (CCIIZ) and was integrated into the Army Endowment Department. The task of the center is to conduct research, development, testing, and evaluation of aeronautical products that are to enter service with the Romanian Armed Forces.

== Bibliography ==
- Penciu, Viorel (2000). Monografia Bazei Aeriene Craiova (in Romanian). Craiova: Sitech.
- Sandachi, Paul (2001). Aviația de luptă reactivă în România: 1951 - 2001. Muzeul Aviației.
