= Ianca Air Base =

- Baza Aeriană Ianca
- Ianca, Brăila County, Romania
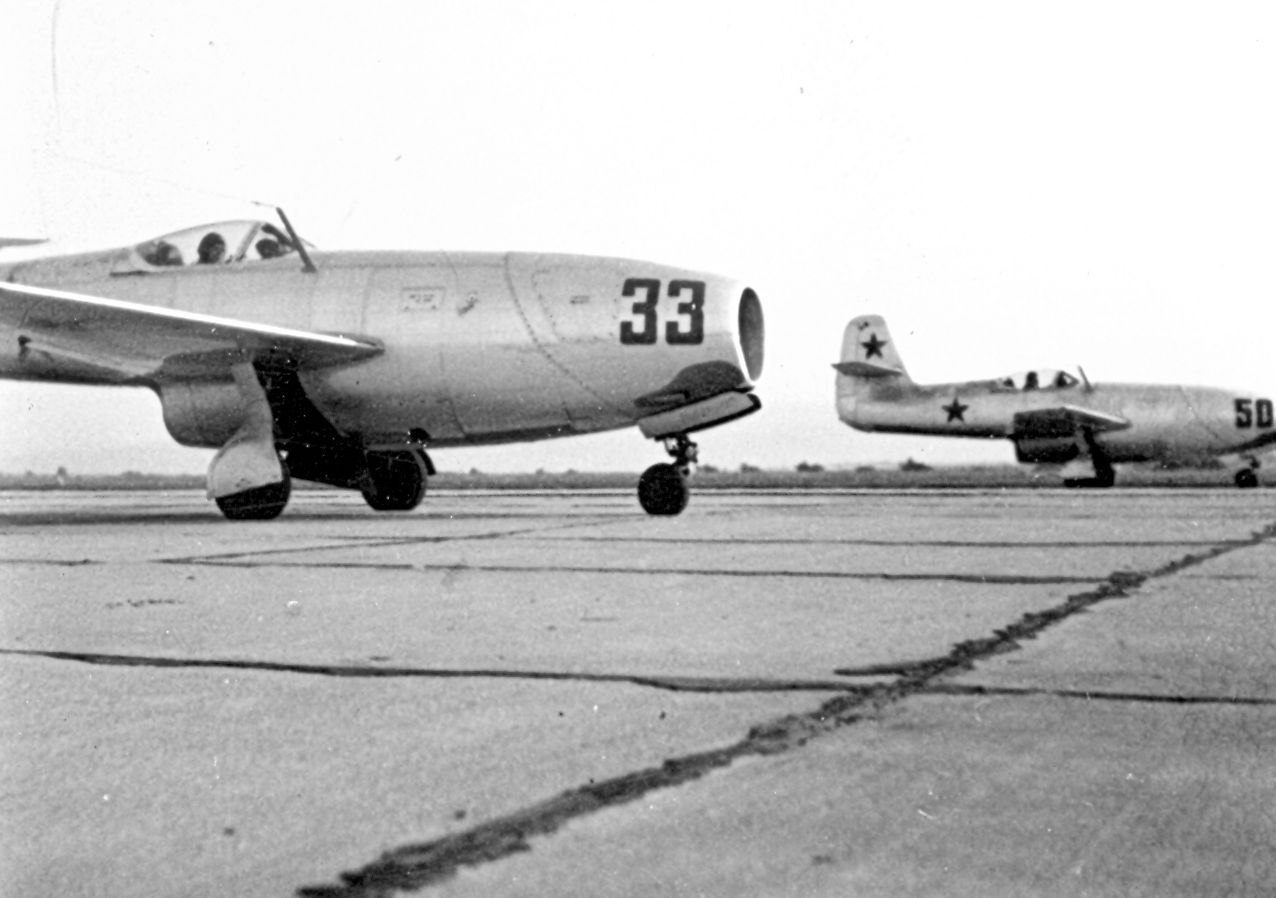
- Yak-23s at Ianca Air Base

Site information
- Controlled by: Romanian Air Force

Location
- Coordinates: 45°09′31″N 027°25′52″E

Site history
- Built: 1941
- In use: 1941–2001

Airfield information
- Elevation: 40 metres (130 ft) AMSL
Runways
Direction	Length and surface
3/21	2,500 metres (8,202 ft) Concrete

The Ianca Air Base, or the 49th Air Base, was a Romanian Air Force base located in the town of Ianca in the Brăila County. It was active from 1941 to 2001 and was the first unit equipped with jet fighters in Romania.

From July 2022, the airfield is owned by the Romanian Aeroclub.

== History ==
The airfield at Ianca was first established in 1941 when a squadron was deployed there to carry out missions in support of the military actions in Bessarabia. After the war, on 28 March 1951, the 3rd Fighter Aviation Division with the 11th, 12th, and 14th Regiments was created at the airfield. At the same time, Soviet equipment was brought to the base, and command and observation points, hangars airplanes, and barracks, as well as a concrete runway were built. During the same month, the unit was equipped with Yak-23 and Yak-17 jets which were brought in and assembled by Soviet technicians and were tested by Soviet pilots. Later, Romanian pilots began also training, and in less than two weeks, the first pilots performed 6 flights on twin-seat airplanes with Soviet instructors. The first flight on a single seat Yak-23 was done by Major Aurel Răican on 26 June 1951.

In July 1953, the 206th Fighter Aviation Regiment initially formed at Deveselu was transferred to Ianca, where it was equipped with the MiG-17PF. It remained at the base until 1958, when it was moved to the Borcea aerodrome. In 1965, the 49th Fighter-Bomber Aviation Regiment was moved from the Alexeni airfield to Ianca.

=== After 1989 ===
The last MiG-15s of the air base were retired in 1990. During the 1990s, the 49th Air Base also retired its IAR 93 aircraft and transferred a number of IAR 99s to 67th Air Base from Craiova. After the transfer, the base received several L-39ZA trainers from Boboc. These airplanes were returned by 1998, and the base remained operating only IAR 99s. Eventually, the base was disbanded, with the IARs being sent to Craiova, and the airfield was used for storage.

In 2009, the airfield was taken from the Ministry of Defence by the County Council with plans to build a civilian airport. These plans never materialized, and on 27 July 2022, the administration of the airfield was given to the Romanian Aeroclub. The current plans are to establish a territorial aeroclub at Ianca.

== First interception mission ==
On the night of 28 October 1952, an unidentified aircraft was detected by radar entering Romanian airspace, and moving towards Brașov. From Ianca, the aircraft continued to be tracked as it passed Bucharest, and headed to Giurgiu towards Bulgaria. Intrigued that the Soviet air units stationed at Otopeni did not react, the leadership from Ianca decided to prepare a Yak-23 to be scrambled to intercept, with Major Dumitru Balaur, commander of the 172nd Jet Fighter Regiment, being chosen for the mission. After reaching Sofia, the target turned left towards Varna, then back towards Romanian airspace. Once it reached Constanța, Major Balaur took off to intercept and was directed towards the unidentified airplane.

The pilot identified the aircraft as a twin-engine bomber, and as its crew did not follow the Romanian pilot's signals to land, the fighter moved behind the target and requested permission to open fire, however, he was ordered to return to base. The next day, the airmen from Ianca learned that the intercepted aircraft was a Soviet Ilyushin Il-28 which was sent on a spy flight over Romania and Bulgaria.
