= AZP =

AZP may refer to:

- 57 mm AZP S-60, an anti-aircraft gun
- Antonio Zanussi Pordenone, a wood-burning oven
- AZP Group, an American power company
