= Zanussi =

Italian home appliance producer

Electrolux Italia S.p.A.
- Formerly: Officina Fumisteria Antonio Zanussi (1916-1926); Antonio Zanussi Pordenone (1926-1952); Fratelli Zanussi S.a.s. (1952-1963); Industrie A. Zanussi S.p.A. (1963-1978); Industrie Zanussi S.p.A. (1978-1994); Electrolux Zanussi S.p.A. (1994-2003)
- Type: Subsidiary
- Industry: Home appliance
- Founded: 1916; 110 years ago
- Founder: Antonio Zanussi
- Headquarters: Pordenone, Italy
- Area served: Worldwide
- Key people: Lino Zanussi
- Products: Home appliances
- Owners: Electrolux (100%)
- Parent: Electrolux
- Subsidiaries: Rex; Zoppas (1970-1973)
- Website: www.zanussi.com

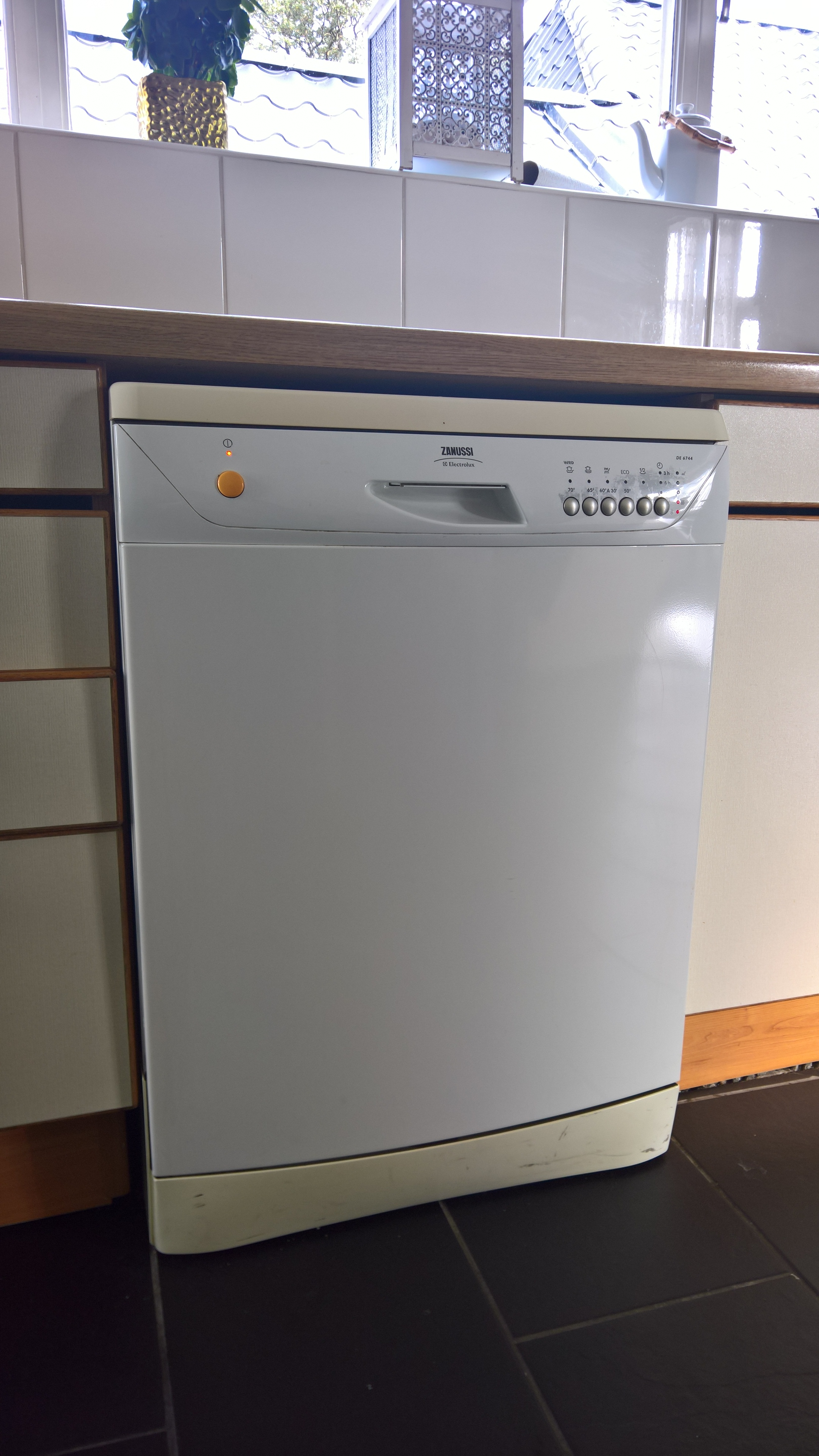
A Zanussi dishwasher

Electrolux Italia S.p.A. (originally Fratelli Zanussi S.a.s., then Industrie A. Zanussi S.p.A., Industrie Zanussi S.p.A. and Electrolux Zanussi S.p.A.) is an Italian household appliance manufacturer based in Pordenone.

Founded in 1916 by Antonio Zanussi, after World War II it became the largest domestic company in the sector, thanks in part to the Rex brand. In 1984, it came under the control of the Swedish multinational Electrolux.

Cease of existence in Italy in 1995, the Zanussi brand is still used for appliances sold abroad and for catering equipment.

== History ==
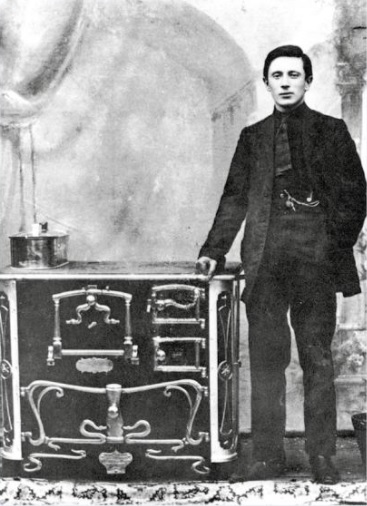
Antonio Zanussi, 1920

Former logo (until 2003; still used outside Italy)

The Zanussi company began as the small workshop of Antonio Zanussi in 1916. The 26-year-old son of a blacksmith in Pordenone in Northeastern Italy began the business by making home stoves and wood burning ovens.

In 1933 Antonio Zanussi launched Rex, the company's newest trademark at that time, to coincide with a huge media event of the day: the new record for a transatlantic crossing (Gibraltar to New York) with which the Italian liner "Rex" conquered the Blue Riband.

In 1946 Antonio Zanussi died and management of the family business passed to his sons Lino and Guido. Under the leadership of Lino, the company developed into a modern industrial concern and in 1951, with a workforce of over 300, the company began to diversify into gas and electric, and combined gas/electric ovens; and, with growing availability and popularity of gas cylinders, Zanussi brought out their first gas cooker – the Rex 401.

A factory was opened at Porcia in 1954 and a Study Centre was established to research and design new appliances.

1958 saw the production of the first Zanussi washing machines. The same strategy underlay the creation, a year later, of the company's Design and research Centre.

In 1959 Zanussi launched the first "Supermarket" fridge with automatic defrosting and two compartments with separate temperature controls. At the end of the 1950s, Zanussi launched its "Tropic System" featuring a rounded style. Meanwhile, the washing machines were already into the second generation, with front-loading, and five washing programmes, developed with an eye for the requirements of the important German market.

In 1960, Zanussi started producing TV sets. By 1962, Zanussi exported its products to 60 countries.

1964 saw the first appearance in Italy of a fridge with a –12C compartment that was suitable for the conservation of frozen food – the "Freezermarket" Rex. In the following year, Zanussi put its first dishwasher on the market.

The next decade was one of important purchases, with the Becchi, Castor, Zoppas and Triplex brands all joining the Zanussi Group, and of the start-up of manufacturing outside Italy. Zanussi advanced to leadership of the Italian household appliance industry with a 25% market share, and was among the foremost producers in Europe with 10% of sales throughout the continent.

In late 1974, Zanussi released the Ping-O-Tronic under the Sèleco brand.

The death of Lino Zanussi and his closest assistants in an airplane crash in Spain on 18 June 1968 marked a change of strategy. In the meantime the economic situation in Italy had changed and with plans for diversification undermined by the difficulties being experienced by Italian industry in general, Zanussi slipped towards financial crisis in the late 1970s and the first half of the 1980s. The recovery process began in 1985 after Electrolux acquired the company in late 1984.

In 1985, Zanussi introduced the Jetsystem on their range of washing machines, which uses a circulation pump to pump the water in the drum onto the clothes via a jet hole in the door seal. This helps save water as the clothes are soaked with soapy water quicker. This can still be found on current Zanussi washing machines.

== Prizes for the design of white appliances ==
- Compasso d'Oro ADI in 1962 for cooker series 700.
- Compasso d'Oro ADI in 1967 for compact washing machine P5.
- Compasso d'Oro ADI in 1981 for corporate image and the entire production.
- Six products selected at the Compasso d'Oro ADI in 1987, 1989, 1991 and 2008.
- Three honour selections at the Compasso d'Oro ADI 1998, 2001 and 2004.
- Two Golden Medals at the Biannuals of Design in Lubiana BIO 12 and BIO19.
- SAMI du Design at Salon des Arts Menagers in Paris year 1990.
- Goed Industrieel Ontwerp (the Netherlands) in 1987, 1991, 1999 and 2001.
- Design Prestige in Brno 1997.
- Premio De Diseño MCMXCVIII. XVI Feria Internacional de L'Avana, Cuba1998.
- Ten Good Design Awards at the Chicago Athenaeum in Chicago in 1999, 2000, 2001, 2002, 2003, 2004.

== Aftersales service ==
Until the end of the 1980s Zanussi service was run from Reading, Berkshire and was a network of independent repairers.

In the early 1990s Electrolux amalgamated all its UK brands under one service entity. This entity was split, dependent on region, between the Zanussi service agents and the local Electrolux Service Centre. In general those in a high population density area were given to the Electrolux employed centres. Tricity Bendix, Electrolux and AEG as well as Zanussi were all to be serviced by the one network.

This was changed in the late 1990s and early 2000s as Electrolux sold or gave away the regional service centres, generally to the existing management or to area managers to run as independent businesses.

This service network was re-branded and became Service Force which still exists today but is, once again, all operated by independent service companies who repair and supply spare parts for all of the brands.

== See also ==
- List of Italian companies
