= Sèleco =

Italian electronics company

Sèleco S.p.A.
- Type: Private company
- Industry: Consumer electronics
- Founded: 1933
- Founder: Giorgio Tranzocchi, Lino Zanussi
- Headquarters: Trieste, Italy
- Area served: Worldwide
- Products: Television set
- Owner: Maria Mancini (via Sargas S.r.l.)
- Parent: Sargas S.r.l.
- Website: seleco-italia.it

Sèleco S.p.A. is an Italian manufacturer of consumer electronics.

== History ==
Sèleco was born in 1965 as a spin-off from the home appliances maker Zanussi. In the first years of its life, Sèleco produced mostly black and white televisions with the Zanussi or Rex brand. The company was put up for sale in 1984, and was acquired by Gian Mario Rossignolo. He first became chairman and then main stockholder.

During the 1980s, the company launched worldwide marketing campaigns and began sponsoring some of the most famous Italian soccer teams, such as S.S. Lazio.

During the '90s, the company was mainly concentrated on the production of pay-TV decoders, but in 1993 suffered from a loss of competitiveness. With the intent to reshape its position and to get gave new life to the company, Gian Mario Rossignolo bought Brionvega from the Brion family, the founder. This attempt went nowhere, so the company was forced to declare failure in 1997. During the years, Sèleco has passed through ups and downs, and at the end it was overcome by the continuous changes in the electronics world.

After the melt-down, the company and all its interests were bought by the Formenti family. This gave rise to the Sèleco-Formenti Group, owner of the rights for the brands Sèleco, Rex, Phonola, Imperial, Stern, Phoenix, Televideon, Kerion and Webrik.

The Formenti family re-launched the company with the production of CRT-TVs. In 2000, the company suffered a strong crisis, following the price dumping made by Turkish manufacturers. This led to end of the Sèleco and Brionvega story, as the Sèleco-Formenti Group was forced to liquidation.

In 2006, Trademark property were entrusted to Super//Fluo except for the Brionvega brand (bought by Sim2 Multimedia), up to the bankruptcy of company, after which Sèleco went to Selek Technology.

In December 2016, Sèleco was acquired by Twenty S.p.A., which successively changed its name to Sèleco S.p.A., moving the company's headquarters and production lines to Trieste. It was revealed that the parent company of Sèleco S.p.A. was owned by Maria Mancini, a woman born in 1939.

Sèleco also acquired a football club Pro Piacenza in June 2018.
