= Piaggio PD.808 =

Business jet aircraft

PD.808
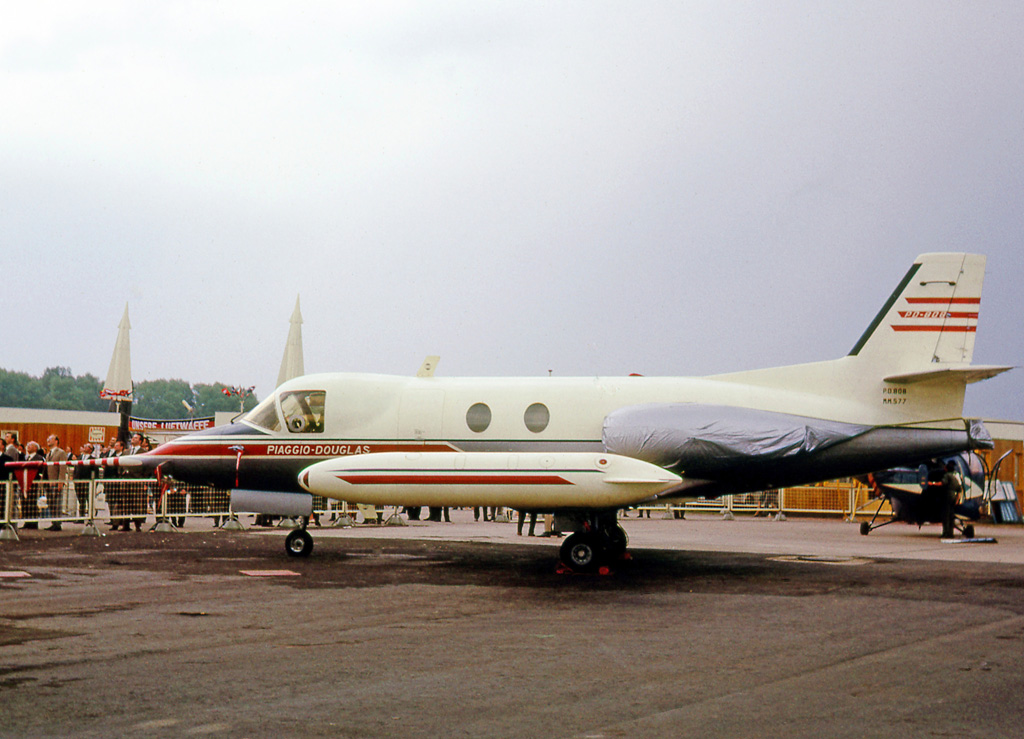
- The prototype Piaggio PD.808 at the 1966 Hanover Air Show wearing Italian Air Force markings

General information
- Type: Business & military jet
- Manufacturer: Piaggio Aero
- Designer: Douglas Aircraft Company
- Primary user: Italian Air Force
- Number built: 24

History
- Introduction date: November 1966
- First flight: 29 August 1964

The Piaggio PD.808 was an Italian business jet built by Piaggio. It was designed as a joint venture between Piaggio and Douglas Aircraft Company of Long Beach, California, United States.

== Design and development ==
Originally named the PD.808 Vespa Jet the business jet was designed in a joint venture between Piaggio and the Douglas Aircraft Company. The basic design work was carried out by Douglas and the prototype was built at the Piaggio factory at Finale Ligure.

The PD.808 was a low-wing cantilever cabin-monoplane with tip-tanks and powered by two rear-mounted Bristol Siddeley Viper 525 turbojets. It has retractable tricycle landing gear and was originally designed with a cabin for a pilot and six-passengers.

The first Viper 525-powered prototype (with Italian Serial Number MM577) first flew on 29 August 1965, this was followed by a second Viper 525 powered prototype and two civil demonstrators.

The company tried to interest commercial operators (including offering a General Electric CJ610 variant) but the only interest was from the Italian Air Force as a liaison, training and radar calibration aircraft with an order for 25. The Italian Air Force aircraft were powered by Viper 526 turbojets.

== Variants ==
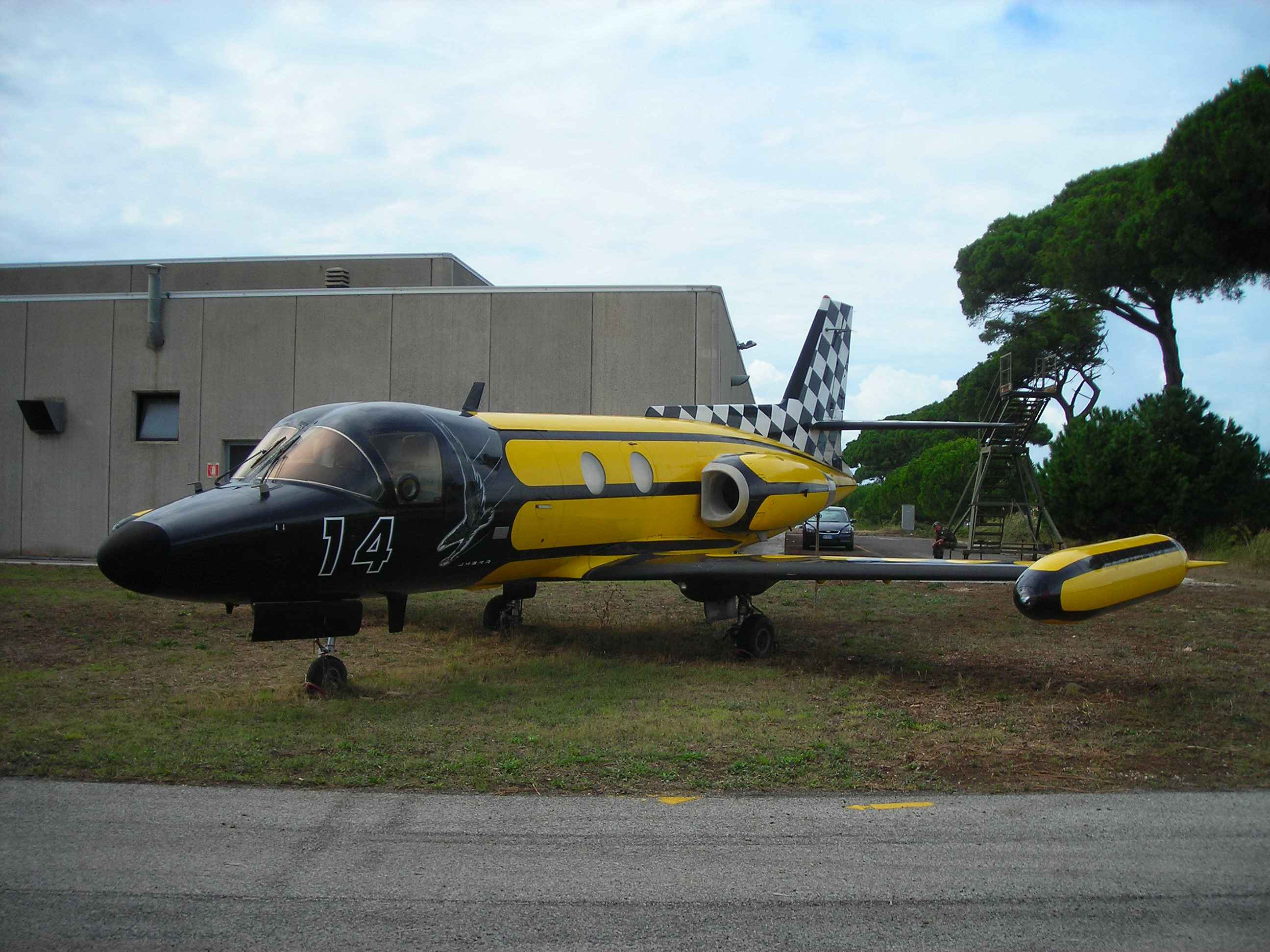
PD.808 in a special commemorative colour scheme at the aircraft show Giornata Azzurra 2006

- PD-808VIP: VIP transport.
- PD-808TA: navigation trainer.
- PD-808RM (radiomisure): radio calibration, four built
- PD-808GE (guerra elettronica): aircraft modified for Electronic warfare, PD-808GE1 entered service in 1972, the PD-808GE2 in 1977.
- PD-808TF: Proposed turbofan-powered version. Not built.

== Operators ==
Italy

- Italian Air Force operated 22 Piaggio PD.808 from 1970 until 2003

== Accidents and incidents ==
On 18 June 1968 one of the demonstration aircraft I-PIAI crashed in bad-weather when it flew into the side of Mount Jaizkibel, near San Sebastian, Spain, all six on-board including the Italian businessman Lino Zanussi and the Piaggio chief test pilot Davide Albertazzi were killed.

== Aircraft on display ==
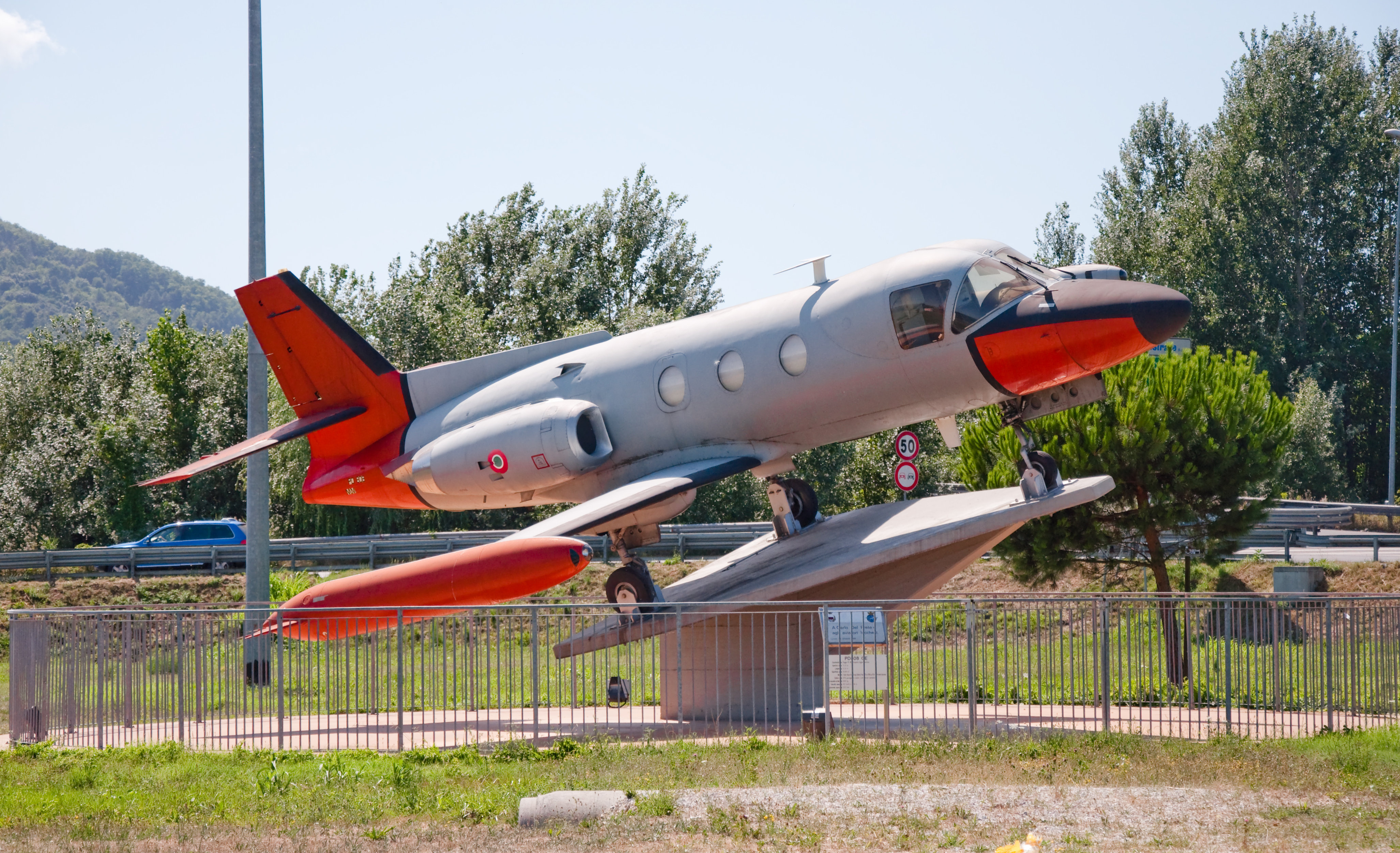
A PD-808 preserved at Lucca, Italy

Italy

- I-PIAL – PD-808VIP on static display at the Volandia museum adjacent to Milan-Malpensa Airport. It is the fourth prototype (c/n 504), used by Piaggio as the company's executive aircraft until the end of the 1980s, and later as a source of spare parts for the Italian Air Force. Piaggio presented it to Volandia in 2017.
- M.M.62015 – PD-808GE on static display in Lucca, Tuscany. It was previously operated by the Italian Air Force.
- M.M.61961 – PD-808GE on static display at the Italian Air Force Museum, located on the former Vigna di Valle Air Base in Bracciano near Rome.

== Specifications (PD.808) ==
Data from , Jane's Aircraft Recognition Guide

General characteristics

- Crew: 1/2
- Capacity: 6-10 pax
- Length: 12.85 m (42 ft 2 in)
- Wingspan: 13.2 m (43 ft 4 in) over tip tanks
- Height: 4.8 m (15 ft 9 in)
- Wing area: 20.9 m^{2} (225 sq ft)
- Aspect ratio: 6.25
- Airfoil: root:DES 0010-1·1-40/11° (modified); DES 0008-1·1-40/9° (modified)
- Empty weight: 4,830 kg (10,648 lb)
- Max takeoff weight: 8,165 kg (18,001 lb)
- Fuel capacity: 1,935 L (511 US gal; 426 imp gal) in wing integral tanks plus 1,792 L (473 US gal; 394 imp gal) in 2 wing-tip tanks
- Powerplant: 2 × Rolls-Royce Viper Mk526 turbojet engines at 3,330lb/f each

Performance

- Maximum speed: 852 km/h (529 mph, 460 kn) at 5,945 m (19,505 ft)
- Maximum speed: Mach 0.85
- Cruise speed: 722 km/h (449 mph, 390 kn) at 1,250 m (4,100 ft)
- Stall speed: 167 km/h (104 mph, 90 kn) at 5,902 kg (13,012 lb) landing weight
- Never exceed speed: 788 km/h (490 mph, 425 kn) (0.85M above 4,260 m (13,980 ft))
- Range: 2,128 km (1,322 mi, 1,149 nmi) with max fuel, 381 kg (840 lb) payload and 45 min fuel reserve
- Service ceiling: 13,715 m (44,997 ft)
- Rate of climb: 27.5 m/s (5,410 ft/min) at sea level and 7,176 kg (15,820 lb)
- Wing loading: 390.6 kg/m^{2} (80.0 lb/sq ft)
- Thrust/weight: 0.0036 kN/kg (0.37 lbf/lb)

== Bibliography ==
- Gaillard, Pierre (March 1989). "Piaggio-Douglas PD-808". Le Fana de l'Aviation (in French) (232): 14–18. ISSN 0757-4169.
