= Alexeni Airfield =

Alexeni airfield
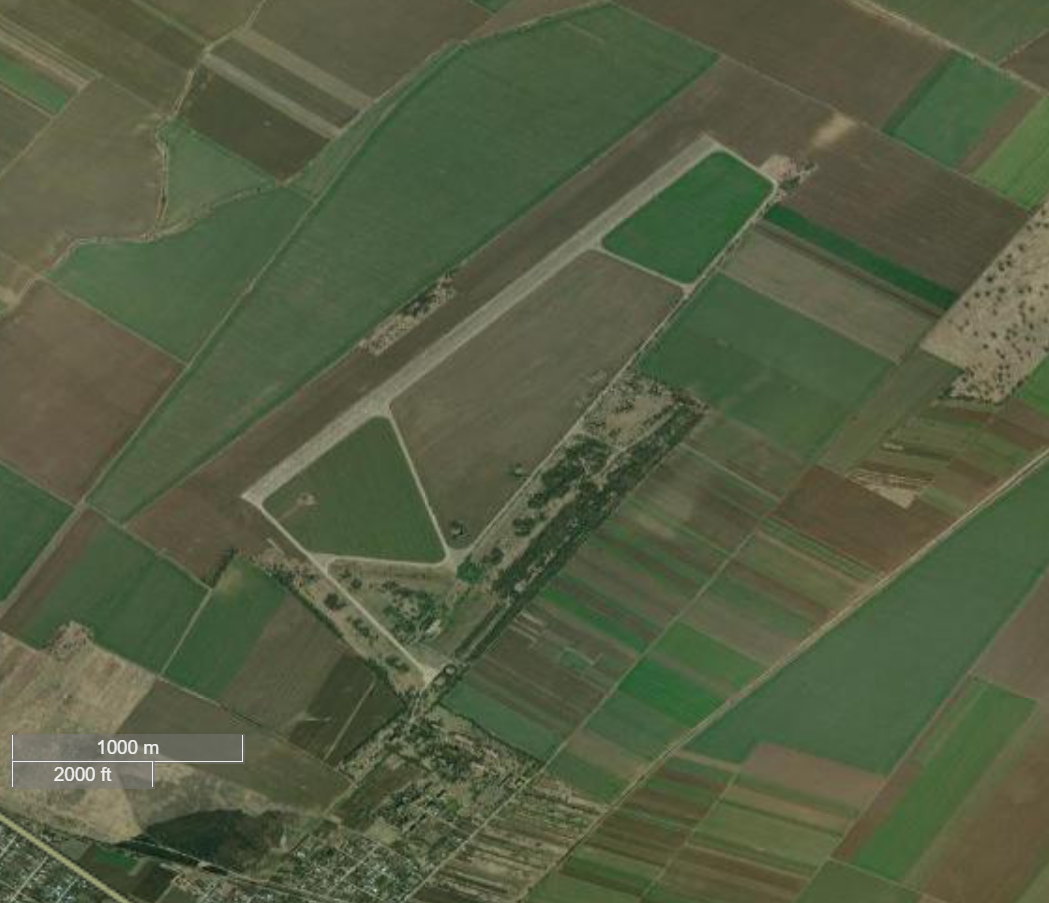
- Satellite view of the airfield
- IATA: none; ICAO: none

Summary
- Owner: Ialomița County Council
- Operator: Automagistral-Pivden SRL and Avant Airports SRL
- Location: Alexeni, Ialomița County, Romania
- Opened: 1954
- Closed: 2001
- Coordinates: 44°42′16.47″N 26°43′7.45″E
- Interactive map of Alexeni airfield

Runways
Direction	Length		Surface
Direction	ft	m	Surface
042/222	8,200	2,500	concrete

Alexeni airfield was a military airfield of the Romanian Air Force located in the Alexeni commune near the city of Urziceni, Ialomița County, at 66 km (41 mi) north-east of the capital city of Romania. Hosting the 94th Helicopter Regiment since 1965, the base was closed in 2001. Following its closure, the Ministry of Transport proposed the airfield as a new low-cost airport for Bucharest.

After the project's failure, the airfield was given to the Ialomița County Council, which leased it in 2024 to a Romanian-Ukrainian joint venture. Under the current plan, Alexeni will be turned into a cargo and passenger hub capable to take over a significant part of the traffic from the Otopeni airport.

== History ==
=== Military base ===
During World War II, a landing ground was set up on the outskirts of Alexeni for the German Luftwaffe fighter units which were intercepting Allied bombing raids targeting Bucharest and Ploiești. After the war, the area was determined to be suitable for fast military interventions and exercises as it was located close to the capital. Under the supervision of General Nicolae Fulga, an airfield was built at Alexeni with the construction being finished in 1954.

In 1958, the 227th Jet Aviation Regiment (Regimentul 227 Aviație Reactivă) equipped with MiG-15s was moved to the base. In 1960, the Regiment changed its name to the 49th Fighter-Bomber Aviation Regiment (Regimentul 49 Aviație Vânătoare-Bombardament) and remained deployed to Alexeni until 1965 when it was transferred to the Ianca airfield.

On 16 June 1968, the Romanian Air Force organized an important air show at Băneasa. For this show, 32 MiG-21s and MiG-15s were brought to Alexeni. After the air show, more fighters were stationed at Alexeni in preparation for the 23 August parade. With the Soviet invasion of Czechoslovakia, the jet fighters stationed at Alexeni received the task of defending the capital in case of attack. After 23 August, the fighters returned to their bases.

From 1965 to 2001 a military helicopter unit, the 94th Helicopter Regiment, was based on this airfield. The regiment was equipped with Soviet and Polish helicopters including Mil Mi-4 and Mi-8, and PZL SM-1 and SM-2. In 1975, the regiment received the IAR-built IAR 330 helicopters. In July 1975, the airfield hosted a parade and a military equipment presentation during which the IAR-93 Vultur was officially unveiled in the presence of Nicolae Ceaușescu.

=== Present airport ===
After the closure of the air base, the airfield was handed over to the Ministry of Justice which further placed it under the National Penitentiary Administration. In 2007, then-Minister of Transport Radu Berceanu suggested the location for Bucharest's new low-cost flights airport (as the operational tariffs for Bucharest's previous low-cost hub, Aurel Vlaicu Airport, were set to grow). However, some analysts considered the project unrealistic and doomed to fail due to the poor conditions of the infrastructure in the area. AllBucharest's low-cost flights were moved to Henri Coandă International Airport in March 2012.

Ialomița County Council, which is the airfield's owner since 2017, launched the auction for the airport concession in August/September 2022, three potential investors expressed their interest, but no one submitted the tender offer at the end of the legal period. The authorities expect the value of the investment needed at cca. €150 mil. The airport concession bid was announced again in December 2022, with eight potential investors who expressed interest.

In 2024, the airport has been officially leased to a Romanian-Ukrainian joint-venture for a period of 49 years. The operator assumed the obligation to invest €400 mil and to open the airport in 2028. It will be the first private operational airport in Romania and the first energetically independent airport in the world. The Romanian company Avant Airports confirmed that it will develop Alexeni into the largest cargo hub in Eastern Europe together with the Ukrainian Automagistral-Pivden company. The airport is to accommodate all types of aircraft and will include a 30,000 m^{2} (320,000 sq ft) passenger terminal as well as a 20,000 m^{2} (220,000 sq ft) cargo terminal. Other planned constructions for the future airport include a photovoltaic park, an aviation school, a train station, a hotel and recreational areas.

== See also ==
- Aviation in Romania
- Transport in Romania
