= Alexeni =

- Commune
- Location in Ialomița County

- Location in Romania
- Coordinates: 44.6780°N 26.7113°E
- Country: Romania
- County: Ialomița

Government
  - Mayor (2020–2024): Ion Crețu (PNL)
- Area: 43.62 km^{2} (16.84 sq mi)
- Elevation: 50 m (160 ft)
- Population (2021-12-01): 2,215
  - Density: 50.78/km^{2} (131.5/sq mi)
- Time zone: UTC+02:00 (EET)
  - Summer (DST): UTC+03:00 (EEST)
- Postal code: 927015
- Area code: +(40) 243
- Vehicle reg.: IL
- Website: primariaalexeni.ro

Alexeni is a commune in Ialomița County, Muntenia, Romania, some 65 km (40 mi) north-east of Bucharest, near the town of Urziceni. It is composed of a single village, Alexeni.

Until 2001 a Romanian Air Force military helicopters unit was located at the nearby Alexeni Airfield. In 2007, as the airfield was not used by the Romanian Air Force any longer, the former Minister of Transport Radu Berceanu suggested to use the location for Bucharest's new low-cost flights airport (as the operational tariffs for Bucharest's previous low-cost hub, Aurel Vlaicu Airport, were set to grow). However, some analysts considered the project unrealistic and doomed to fail due to the poor conditions of the infrastructure in the area. Eventually those plans were abandoned and all low-cost flights were moved in March 2012 at Bucharest main airport, the Henri Coandă International Airport.

Historical population
Year	Pop.	±%
1899	1,583	—
1925	2,050	+29.5%
2002	2,504	+22.1%
2011	2,410	−3.8%
2021	2,215	−8.1%
Source: Census data

== Natives ==
- Chira Apostol (born 1960), rower
