= Avioane Craiova =

Romanian aeronautical company

Avioane Craiova S.A.

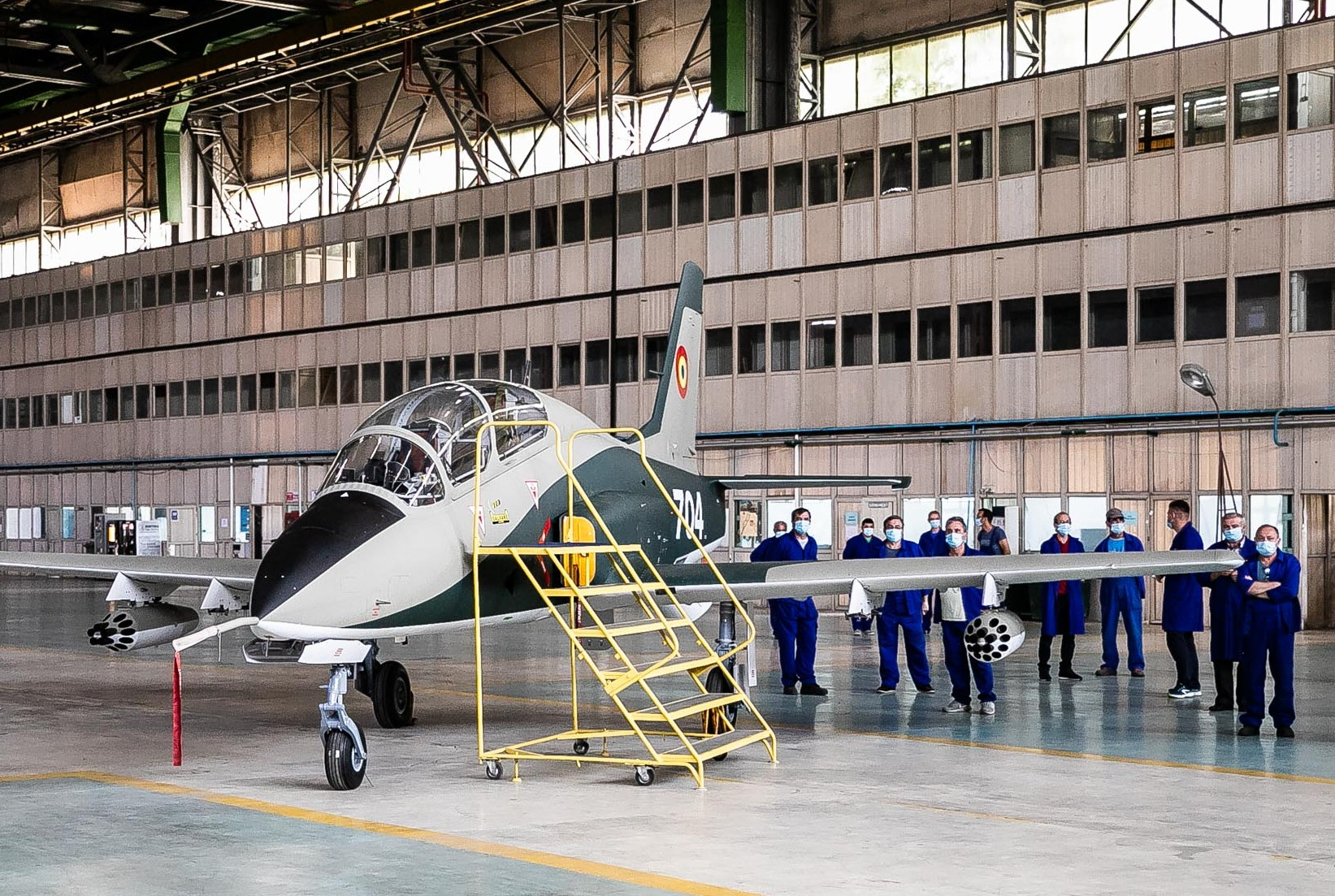
- IAR 99 Șoim at the Craiova aircraft factory, 2020
- Type: Public
- Industry: Aerospace
- Founded: 1972
- Headquarters: Craiova, Romania
- Website: www.acv.ro

Avioane Craiova S.A. ("Craiova Airplanes" in English) is an aeronautical company based in Ghercești, near Craiova, Romania. It has been involved in the manufacture of various military aircraft, including the IAR-93 Vultur ground-attack fighter, the IAR-99 advanced jet trainer/light attack aircraft, and the cancelled IAR-95 Spey fighter.

Avioane Craiova was established in 1972 to develop, manufacture, and provide support for several military aircraft. Its services have been principally used by the Romanian Air Force, although export sales have also been pursued by the company. Since the start of the 2000s, the Romanian government has made persistent efforts to privatise Avioane Craiova.

== History ==
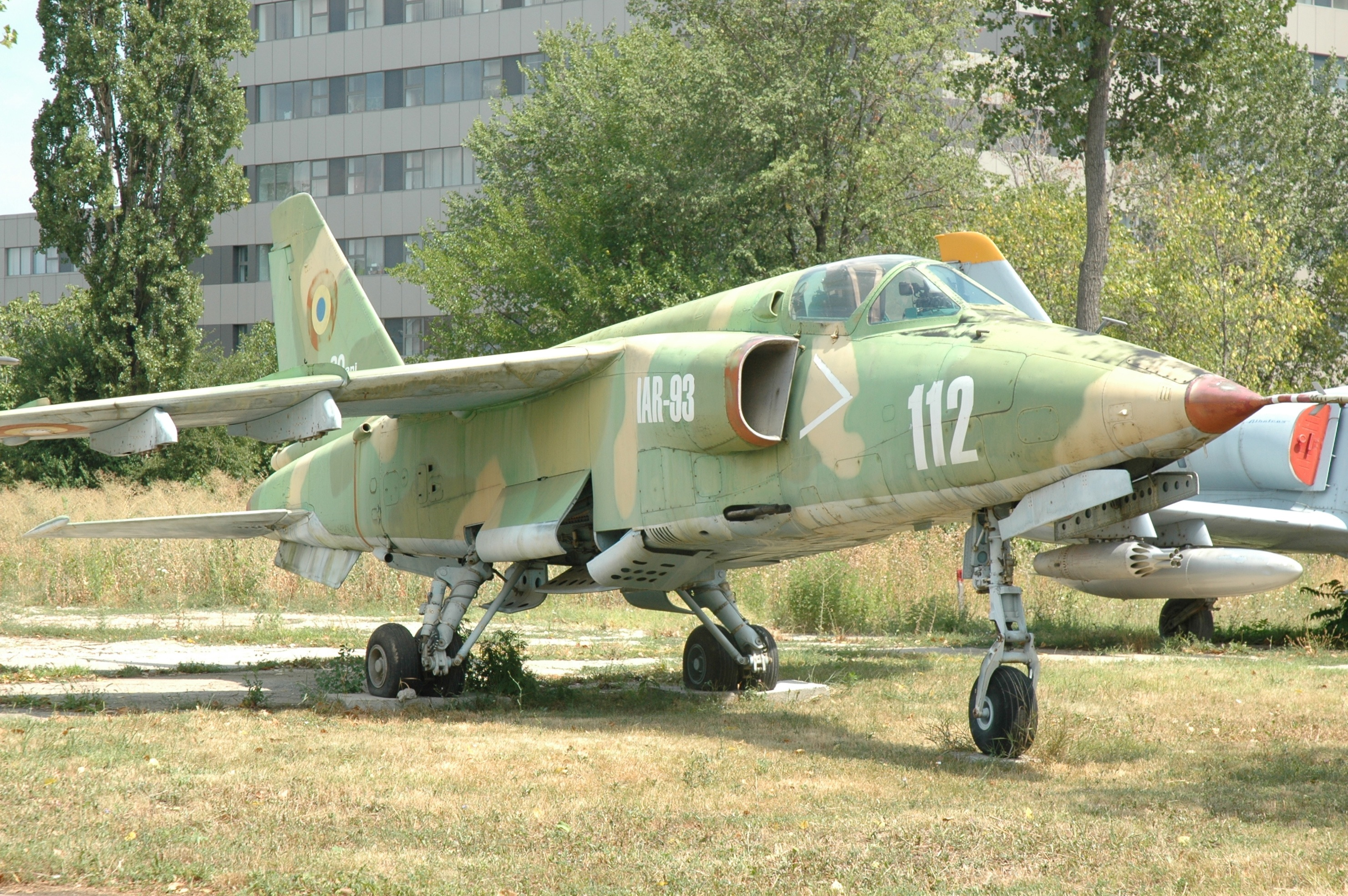
IAR-93 Vultur

Immediately following its establishment in 1972, Avioane Craiova became involved in a multinational aircraft programme in which Romania co-operated with the neighbouring nation of Yugoslavia to jointly develop and produced a military twin-engined ground attack and tactical reconnaissance aircraft, the IAR-93 Vultur. In addition to Avioane Craiova, two other Romanian companies, Aerostar Bacău and IAR Brașov, along with the Yugoslavian aircraft manufacturer SOKO, worked together on the IAR-93 programme. First flown in 1985, around 200 aircraft were constructed and entered in service with the Romanian Air Force prior to the end of production in 1992. During the 1990s, Avioane Craiova independently proposed various upgrades and modifications to the IAR-93 fleet.

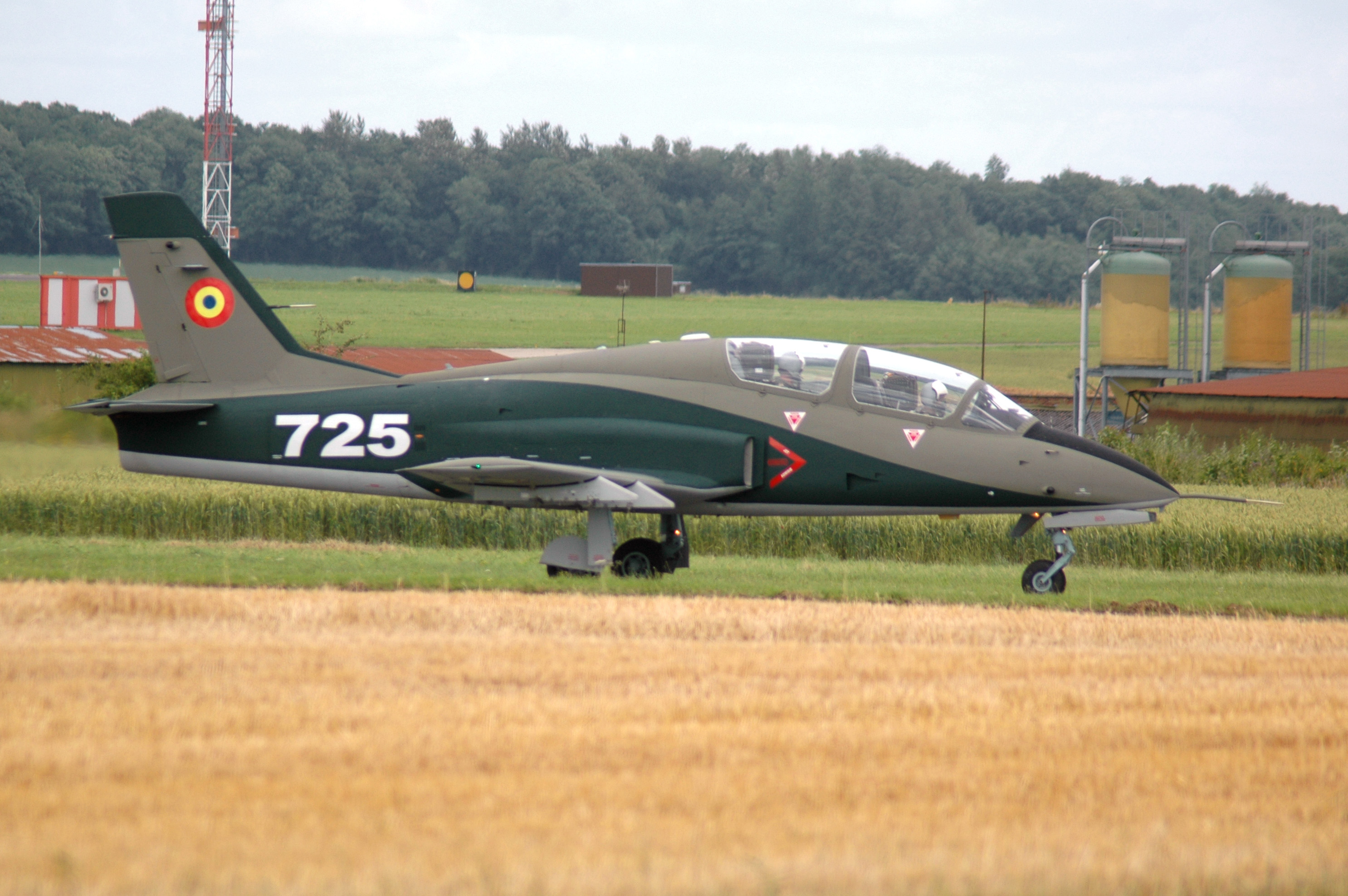
IAR-99 Șoim

Amid the late 1970s, Avioane Craiova commenced work on an envisioned indigenous supersonic fighter jet, commonly referred to as the IAR-95, which was intended to be adopted by the Romanian Air Force. However, work on the project was terminated in 1981, but revived shortly thereafter. During 1988, the IAR-95 programme was cancelled for a second and final time, allegedly due to a lack of available funds. Work had been halted prior to the completion of a single prototype, a full-scale mockup had reportedly been partially constructed.

During the 1980s, another aircraft programme was launched by the company. This effort resulted in the development of an advanced jet trainer and light attack aircraft, the IAR-99. Despite deliveries commencing in 1987, the programme was hampered by the decline in Romanians' economic conditions during the early 1990s. In September 1998, the Romanian government authorised the upgrade of the existing 24 IAR-99s of the Romanian Air Force with a new avionics suite that was developed in collaboration with the Israeli aerospace company Elbit Systems. By 2009, Avioane Craiova was claiming that the IAR-99 remained in active production, specifically as the modernised IAR-99 Șoim (Hawk) variant. By 2017, only 19 examples were in use with the Romanian Air Force, the type's sole operator to date. Avioane Craiova has continued to pursue upgrades and partnerships, as well as the promotion of IAR-99 in upgraded forms as late as September 2017.

During the 2000s, the Romanian government has made efforts to privatise many of its state-owned assets, including Avioane Craiova. In May 2008, aerospace periodical Flight International reported that a total of three bidders had issued offers to acquire up to 81 percent of the company, these being the Italian aerospace manufacturer Alenia Aeronautica, the Czech Republic–based aircraft company Aero Vodochody, and local agency INAV Bucharest. At one stage, Aero Vodochody appeared to by the frontrunner, the company having promoted its plans to develop Avioane Craiova's aerostructures capabilities. However, by October 2008, none of the bidders were willing to agree to the contractual terms presented and had therefore pulled out of the privatisation process, forcing it to be restarted.

In 2020, the company was contracted to modernize ten IAR 99 Standard to the IAR 99 SM variant. All aircraft were to be delivered by 2024, however after delays which were claimed to have been caused by the COVID-19 pandemic and the Russian invasion of Ukraine, the first aircraft finished modernization in December 2023.

=== Warbird projects ===
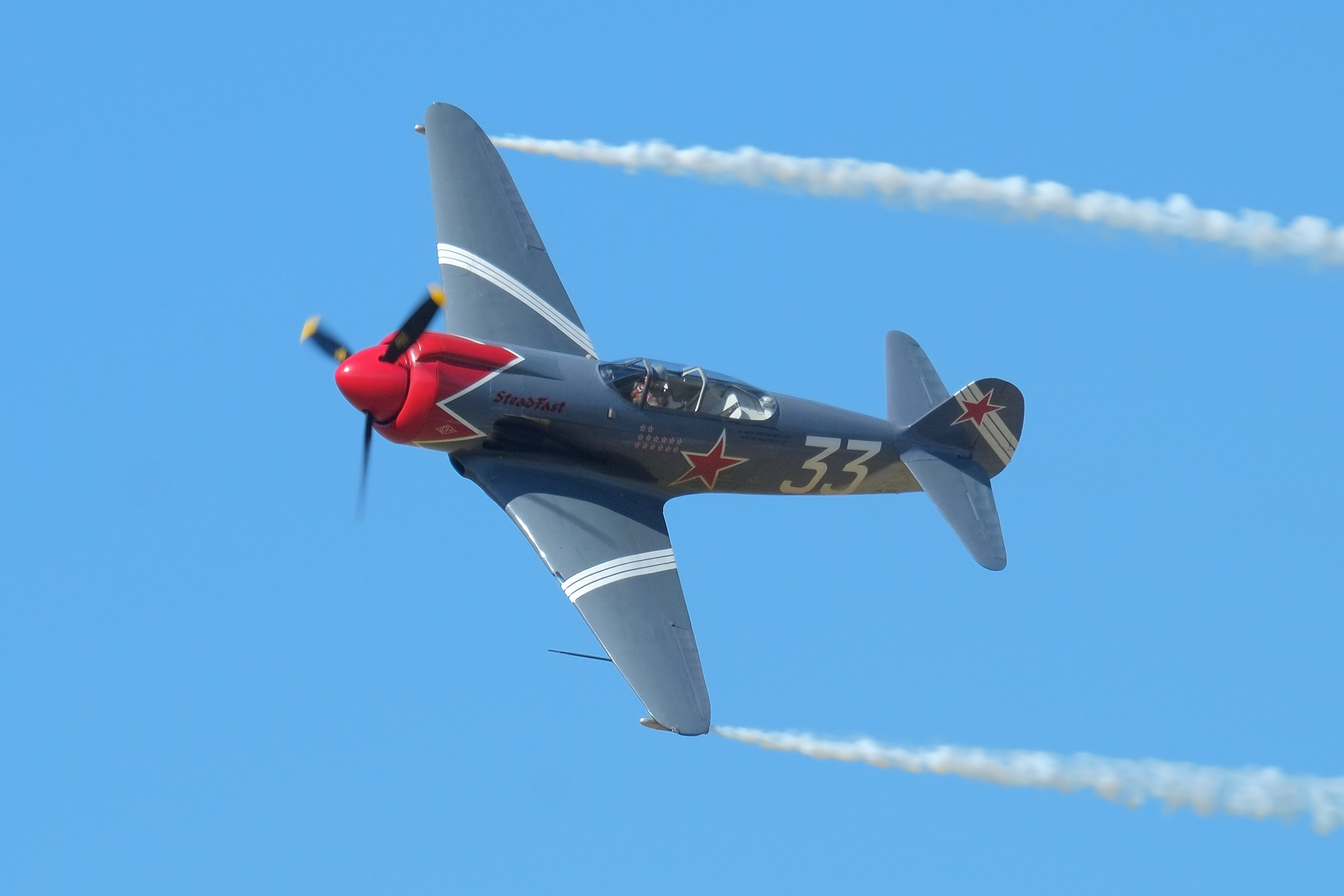
Yak-3U "Steadfast"

Replicas of the Yak-3U were produced at Avioane Craiova. The project started in 1992, when 10 airplanes were ordered by a French company. The Yak-11 no. 47, located at the National Military Museum, which was converted in the 1950s into a single-seat aerobatic plane was used as a model. The first Yak-3U replica flew in 1994, two years after the contract was signed.

Nine replicas were produced with the Pratt & Whitney R-1830-92 engines. In 2005, a variant was made with a more powerful R-2000 engine. This airplane was bought by Will Whiteside who named it "Steadfast" and kitted it out to compete in the Reno Air Races. In 2011, he set the under-3,000 kg (6,600 lb) World Speed Record at Wendover, Utah in the United States, travelling at a speed of 670 km/h (416 mph).

In 2013 it was moved to Australia where it was registered as VH-YOV on 24 December 2013. It was purchased by the Omaka Aviation Heritage Centre in September 2019.

== Products ==
Model name	First flight	Number built	Type
IAR 93 Vultur	1974	88	Twin engine monoplane attack airplane
IAR 99	1985	28	Single engine monoplane advanced trainer
Yakovlev Yak-3	1994	10	Replica single engine monoplane fighter

=== Projects ===
- IAR-95 Spey
- IAR-109 Swift

== See also ==
- Aviation in Romania
- IAR
