= IAR 99 =

Romanian trainer/light attack aircraft

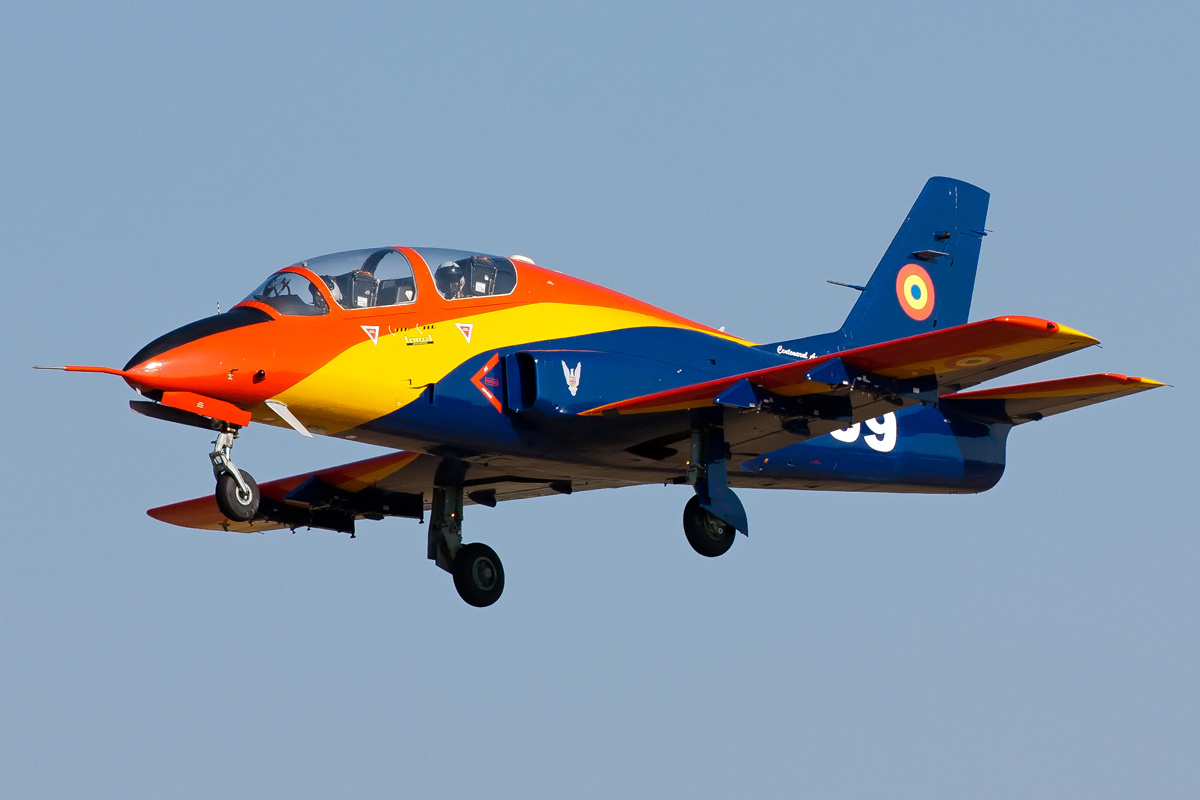
- IAR 99 of the Romanian Air Force

General information
- Type: Advanced trainer and light attack aircraft
- National origin: Romania
- Manufacturer: Avioane Craiova
- Status: In service
- Primary user: Romanian Air Force
- Number built: 28 (25 Șoim/C 3 prototip)

History
- Manufactured: 1985–2008
- Introduction date: 1987
- First flight: 21 December 1985

The IAR 99 Șoim (Hawk) is an advanced trainer and light attack aircraft designed and produced by the Romanian aircraft manufacturer Avioane Craiova. It is capable of performing front line roles, including those of close air support and aerial reconnaissance.

Development of the IAR 99 begun in 1975, and the prototype conducted its maiden flight on 21 December 1985. Serial production commenced two years later. The aircraft is of semi-monocoque design, with tapered wings and a swept-back tail unit. A large blade-type antenna installed beneath the nose on the port side of the fuselage gives the IAR 99 a distinctive appearance. Introduced by the Romanian Air Force during the late 1980s, the IAR 99 gradually displaced both the Aero L-29 Delfin and Aero L-39 Albatros as the primary jet trainer of the service.

Since its introduction, various modifications and variants of the IAR 99 have been implemented or proposed. Various small changes made during the 1990s were centred around boosting safety and lowering maintenance demands, as well as to adapt it for use as the lead-in trainer for Romania's MiG-21 Lancer fleet. A more extensive upgrade involving American-sourced avionics was worked on, including the adaption of three IAR 99s as flying testbeds and aerial demonstrators, but was ultimately not rolled out to production aircraft. During the early 2020s, the existing IAR 99 airframes were modernised for continued service with the Romanian Air Force. Despite marketing and development efforts, no export sales have been secured for the type to date.

== Development ==
In 1975, design work on what would become the IAR 99 commenced, the project would produce the first jet trainer to be both fully designed and built in Romania. Four years later, funding was approved for the construction of the first aircraft by I.Av. Craiova; at the time, the firm was also engaged in the manufacture of the IAR 93 attack aircraft. In 1983, the existence of the IAR 99 was publicly revealed at the Paris Airshow; at the event, it was claimed that the aircraft was already being test flown. On 21 December 1985, the prototype (S-001) performed its maiden flight with Lt. Col. Vagner Ștefănel at the controls. S-002 served for static (ground) testing, S-003 being the second flying prototype (later re-serialled 7003).

The aircraft entered series production in 1987, with 17 aircraft delivered to the Romanian Air Force by 1989.. Early refinements and post-delivery modifications were focused around increasing operational safety as well as ease of maintenance.

In 1990, the fall of the Eastern Bloc created new export opportunities for the aircraft. Despite the aircraft possessing excellent aerodynamic and handling qualities, it was left behind in several competitors largely on account of its obsolete avionics. Accordingly, upgrades became a commercial priority.

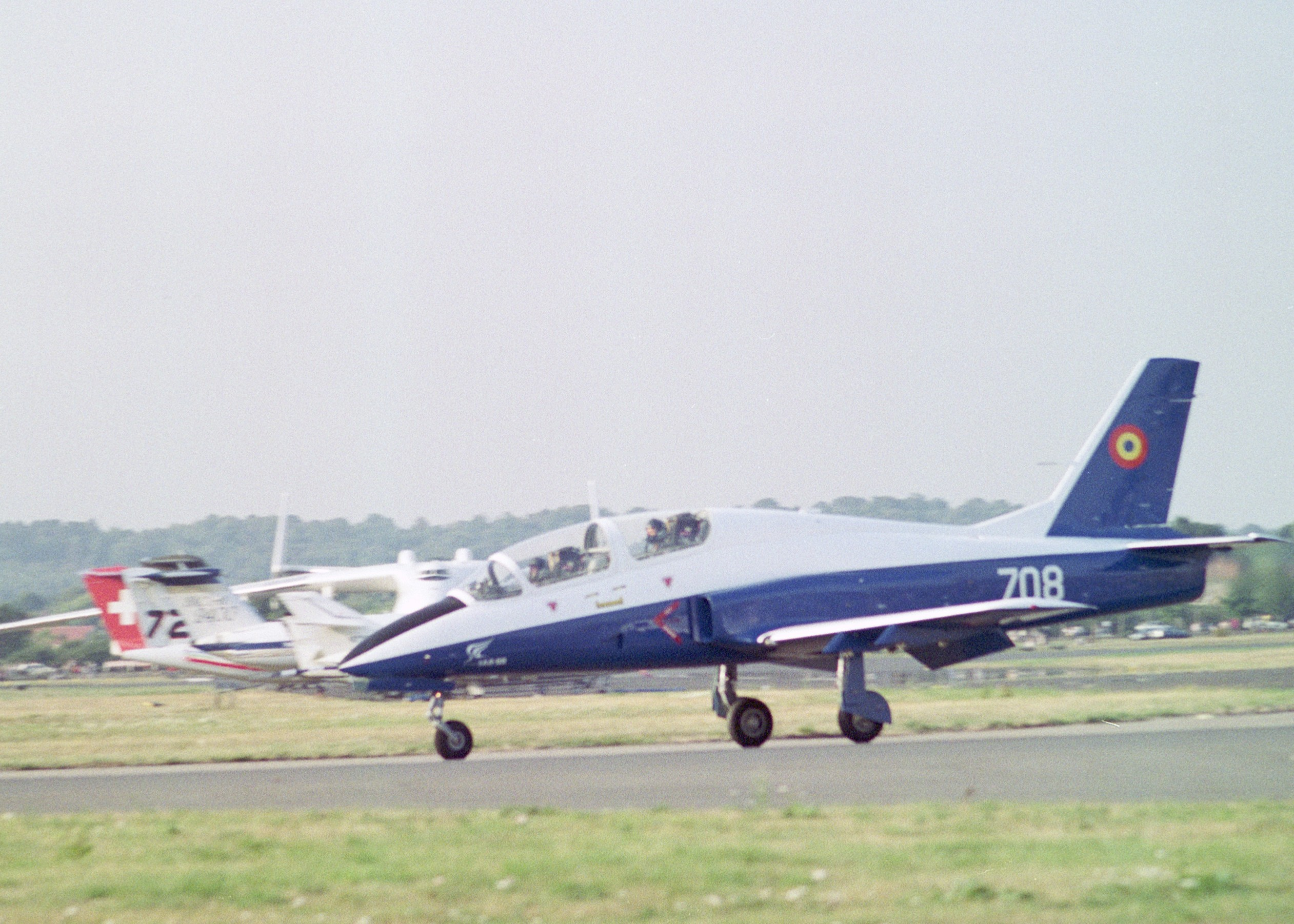
IAR 99 at Farnborough

The first upgrade attempt was made in 1990 by I.Av.Craiova together with the Texas-based Jaffe Aircraft Corporation. Aircraft 708 and 709 were modified by installing Honeywell avionics, while the canopy was changed to a two-piece design instead of the original one piece; this change would be retained for all subsequent aircraft. 708 took its first flight on 8 August 1990, followed by 709 weeks later. The aircraft were displayed at the 1990 Farnborough Airshow, being proposed for the Joint Primary Aircraft Training System program for the United States of America, although this work resulted in no orders. In 1991, aircraft number 712 was outfitted with Collins avionics and took part in a show in Ankara, Turkey. Subsequently, aircraft 708, 709 and 712 were reconfigured to Standard and delivered to the Romanian Air Force.

In 1996, the upgrade program of the IAR 99 was revived with the need for a lead-in trainer for the newly upgraded MiG-21 Lancer. The Israeli company Elbit was chosen as an integrator. The avionics package selected was stated to be compatible with fifth generation fighter systems and it was inspired by the MiG-21 Lancer upgrade, but adapted to the requirements for the IAR 99. The first upgraded IAR 99 was the 18th production aircraft (number 718), which performed its first flight on 22 May 1997. The upgraded IAR 99 was displayed at Paris in 1997 and Farnborough in 1998.

On 6 August 1998, the Romanian Government approved the introduction into series production of the upgrade program for 24 IAR-99 Șoim, out of which four were originally scheduled to be delivered by 2001. On 20 April 2000, the Romanian Ministry of National Defence signed a contract covering all 24 aircraft; however, the scope was reduced to only 12 aircraft on 14 December 2000. Of these, seven IAR 99s were to be new-builds (numbers 719–725) while five were upgraded from existing airframes (numbers 709, 711, 712, 713, 717). The upgraded aircraft were delivered between 2003 and 2008, gradually replacing the L-39 Albatros' in service with the Romanian Air Force's training school. Thus, the Romanian Air Force will have 12 IAR 99 C Șoim (upgraded) and 11 IAR 99 Standard, with 7003 remaining with Avioane Craiova SA as demonstrator aircraft.

In 2015, a consortium composed of Avioane Craiova, INCAS and CCIZ announced that an enhanced version of the IAR 99 called IAR 99 TD is under development. A single airframe will be built with a new avionics suite, an engine and radar. The Leonardo Vixen 500E radar was chosen and requires lengthening the nose by 900mm. A new powerplant which supports computer control is required to replace the Rolls-Royce Viper engine, which had been designed during the 1950s; this in turn will necessitate a twice as big air intake. A prototype is expected to be completed by 2022.

In December 2020, Elbit Systems announced they had been awarded the contract to upgrade the remaining 10 IAR 99 Standard airframes in service with the Romanian Air Force. The upgrade, performed by Avioane Craiova, was to be finished by 2024. However, due to several delays, the first aircraft was modernized in December 2023. One factor in these delays has been the Russo-Ukrainian war as suppliers were requested to put other projects on hold to prioritise aid to Ukraine.

== Design ==
The fuselage of the IAR 99 is of conventional semi-monocoque construction, being all-metal and possessing an oval cross-section. It is equipped with retractable tricycle landing gear, each unit being equipped with a single wheel and an oleo-pneumatic shock absorber; when retracted, the landing gear is full enclosed. The IAR 99 is powered by a non-afterburning model of the Rolls-Royce Viper turbojet engine, which also powered the IAR 93 attack aircraft. Installed within the rear fuselage, air is supplied to the engine via a pair of lateral intakes set on either side of the fuselage in line with the rear of the cockpit. No air brake is present.

The IAR 99 features a low-mounted cantilever monoplane wing with unswept leading and trailing edges along with a three-degree dihedral. It is equipped with ailerons and trim tabs. The wing employs a conventional structure, comprising a pair of spars, webs and flanges. Furthermore, the wing is equipped with a total of four underwing hardpoints that permit the platform to perform weapons training and light attack missions. The tail unit features a rear-swept fin and a balanced rudder; the tailplane is unswept, lacks any dihedral, and features balanced elevators. Trim tabs are present in each elevator and the rudder.

The aircraft has a tandem-stepped dual-control cockpit, which is equipped with Martin-Baker Mk 10 zero-zero ejection seats. The instructor's seat at the rear position is raised by 35 cm to provide better visibility. The canopy was made as a single piece (prototypes and planes 701–707), later changed to a two-piece canopy, both opening to the starboard side. The cockpit is equipped with Liquid Crystal Displays (LCDs) and HOTAS flight controls. Both the pilot and the instructor are equipped with a DASH Display and Sight Helmet identical to those used on Romanian MiG-21 Lancer fighters; this helmet guides the onboard weapons systems to the pilot's line of sight and (via the visor's display) confirms when target acquisition has been achieved. The visor also displays the data from the HUD (Head-Up Display) while flight and navigation data are displayed on HUD, on the helmet DASH and MFDC (color multifunction displays).

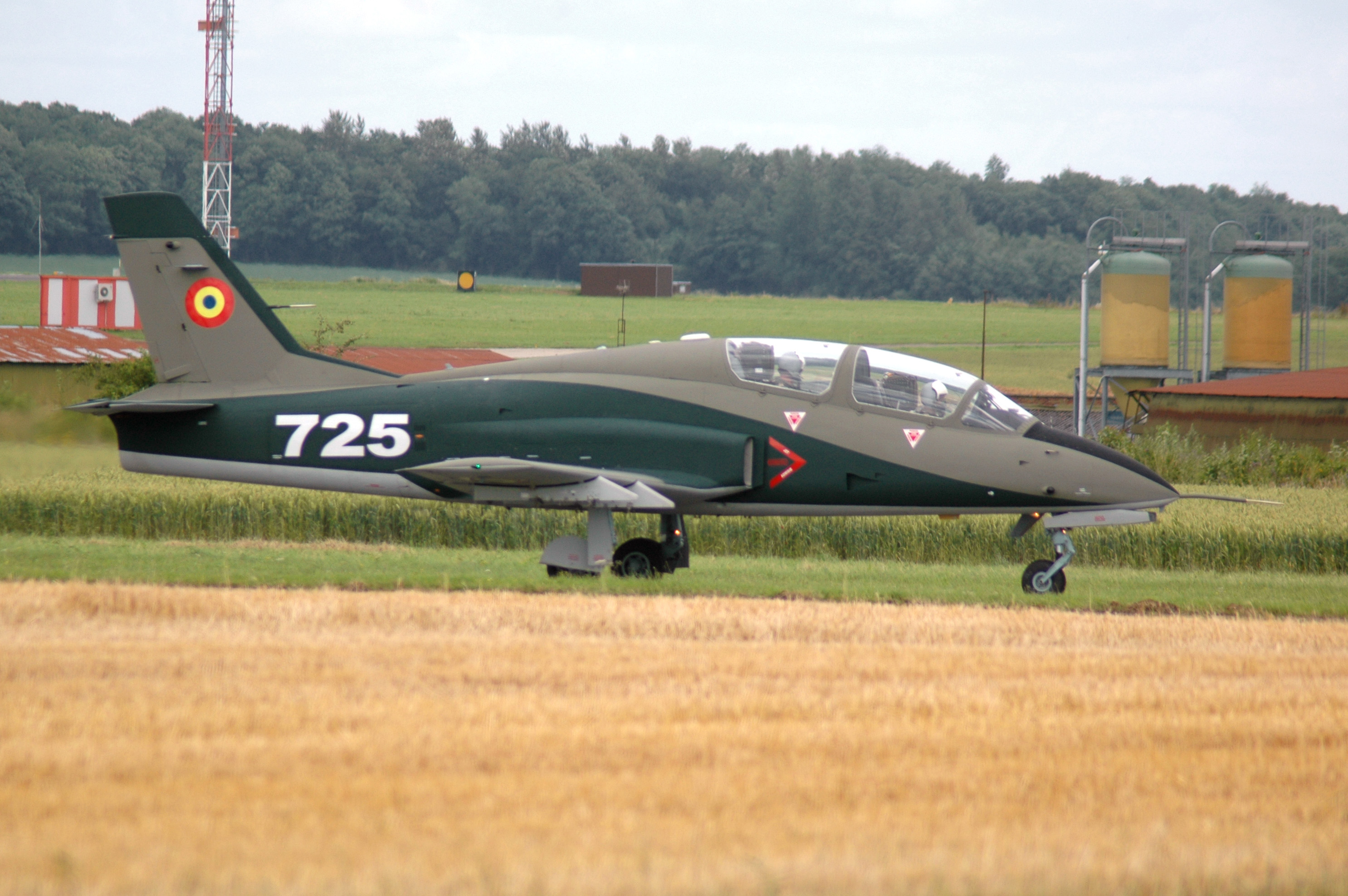
IAR 99 Șoim

Elbit is supplying the aircraft's advanced avionics suite installed on a MIL-STD-1553B data bus. The advanced avionics suite, including communications, navigation, identification systems and the cockpit configuration, are similar to those of the MiG 21 LanceR and F-16 fighter aircraft. The IAR 99 is also equipped with video and debriefing systems.

The communication systems include VHF and UHF communications, voice-activated intercom and an IFF transponder. The flight systems include a VOR/ILS, linked VHF omnidirectional antenna radio ranger linked to the instrument landing system. Other navigation tools include distance measuring equipment (DME), an automatic direction finder (ADF), a Northrop Grumman inertial navigation system and a Trimble GPS system. One of the best features of the aircraft's avionics is a virtual training system that allows, based on a data link system, inflight simulations of firing and air combat capabilities using two or more aircraft.

The electronic warfare suite of the IAR 99 is based on the Elisra Electronic Systems radar warning receiver and electronic countermeasures pod plus a chaff and flare decoy dispenser. The systems are integrated through the 1553 data bus. The radar warning receiver detects pulse-Doppler, pulse and continuous wave radar threats and provides threat identification by comparing signal characteristics against a threat database.

== Variants ==
- IAR-99 "Standard"
Initial variant designed as a lead-in trainer for the IAR-93.

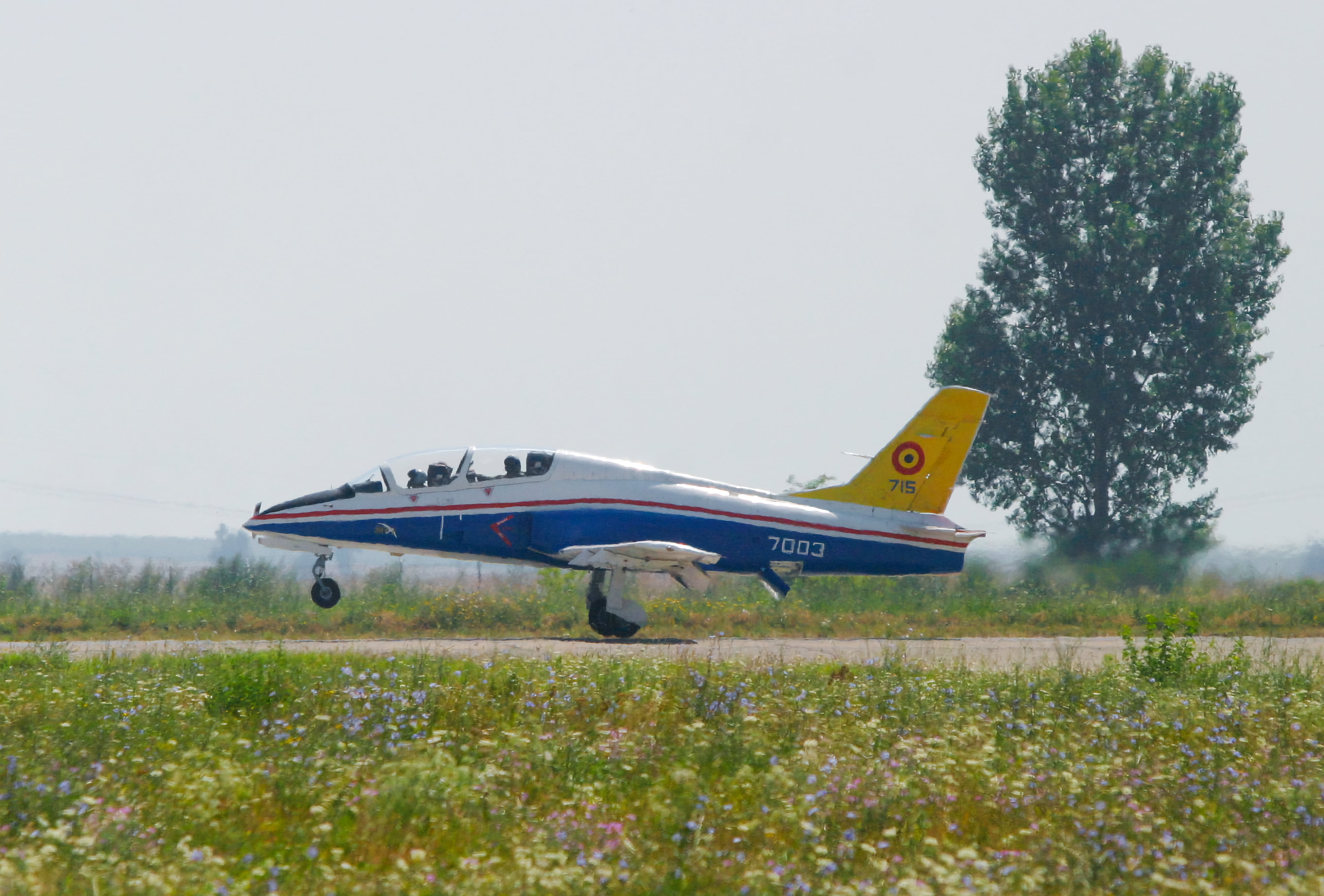
IAR 99, number 7003, landing in 2006. Note below the cockpit, the white bird logo overlapping the yellow "Swift" writing.

- IAR-109 "Swift"
In 1992, an upgrade program was started in partnership with IAI Lahav of Israel, for both Romanian Air Force use and export. Aircraft number 7003 was equipped with HOTAS (Hands On Throttle and Stick) controls in both cockpits, a wide-angle HUD (Head-Up Display) with Up Front Control Panel in the front cockpit, two 3 inch displays in both cockpits, a ring laser gyro Inertial Navigation System (INS), as well as the integration of both Eastern and Western weapon systems on the aircraft. The aircraft was displayed at the 1993 Paris Air Show and flew at Asian Aerospace in 1994. A prospective sale of 10 aircraft to Botswana was blocked in parliament, ending the collaboration with IAI. The aircraft was converted back to Standard configuration and delivered to the center for flight research and testing (CCIZ). As late as 2009 it still retained its "Swift" styled paint scheme and logo.

- IAR-99C "Șoim"

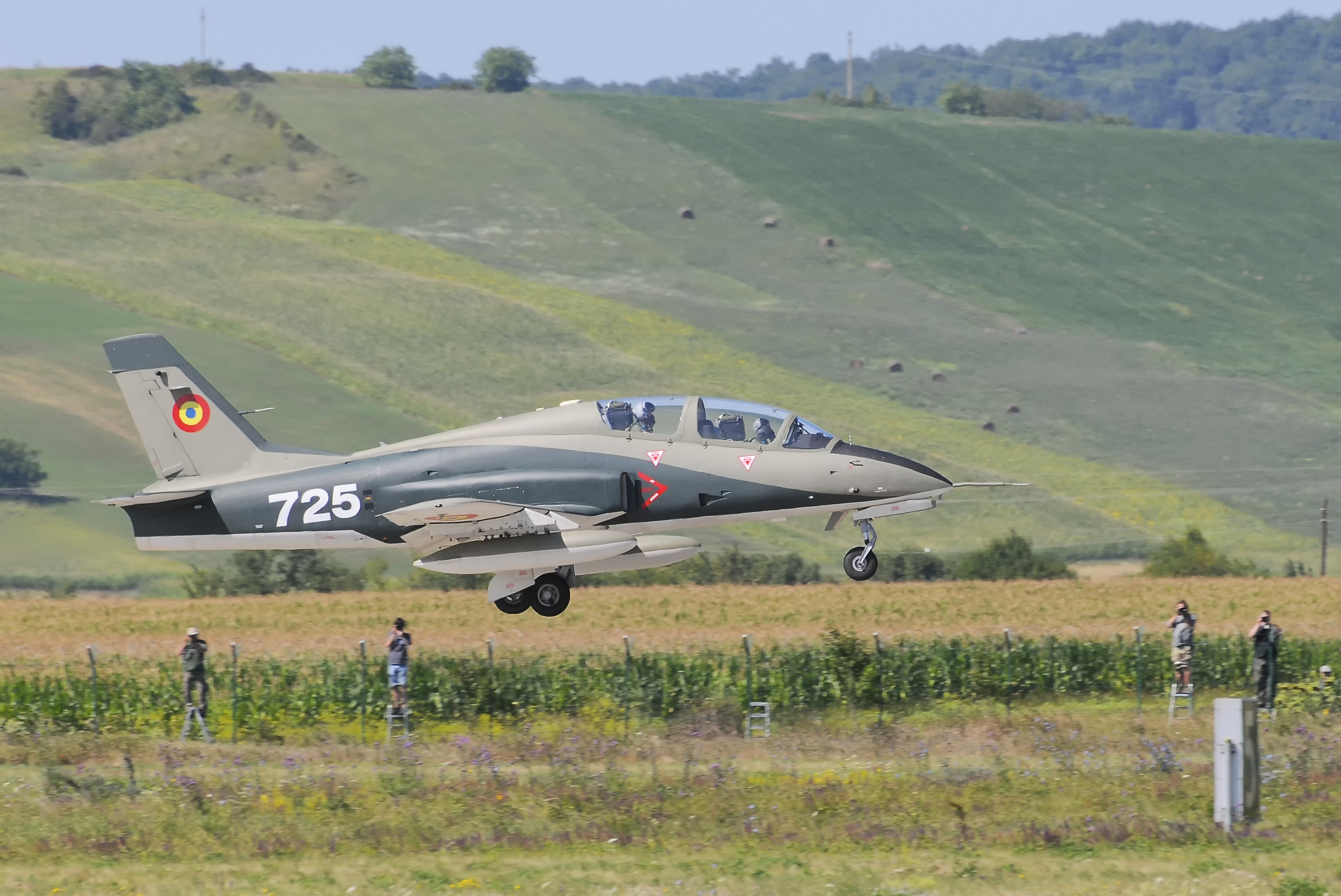
IAR-99C landing at RoAF 71st Airbase during open doors 2017.

Upgraded variant using an Elbit Systems avionics package.

- IAR-99TD
Technical demonstrator under development which will act as base for a future new trainer aircraft called IAR-99NG.

- IAR-99SM "Standard Modernizat"

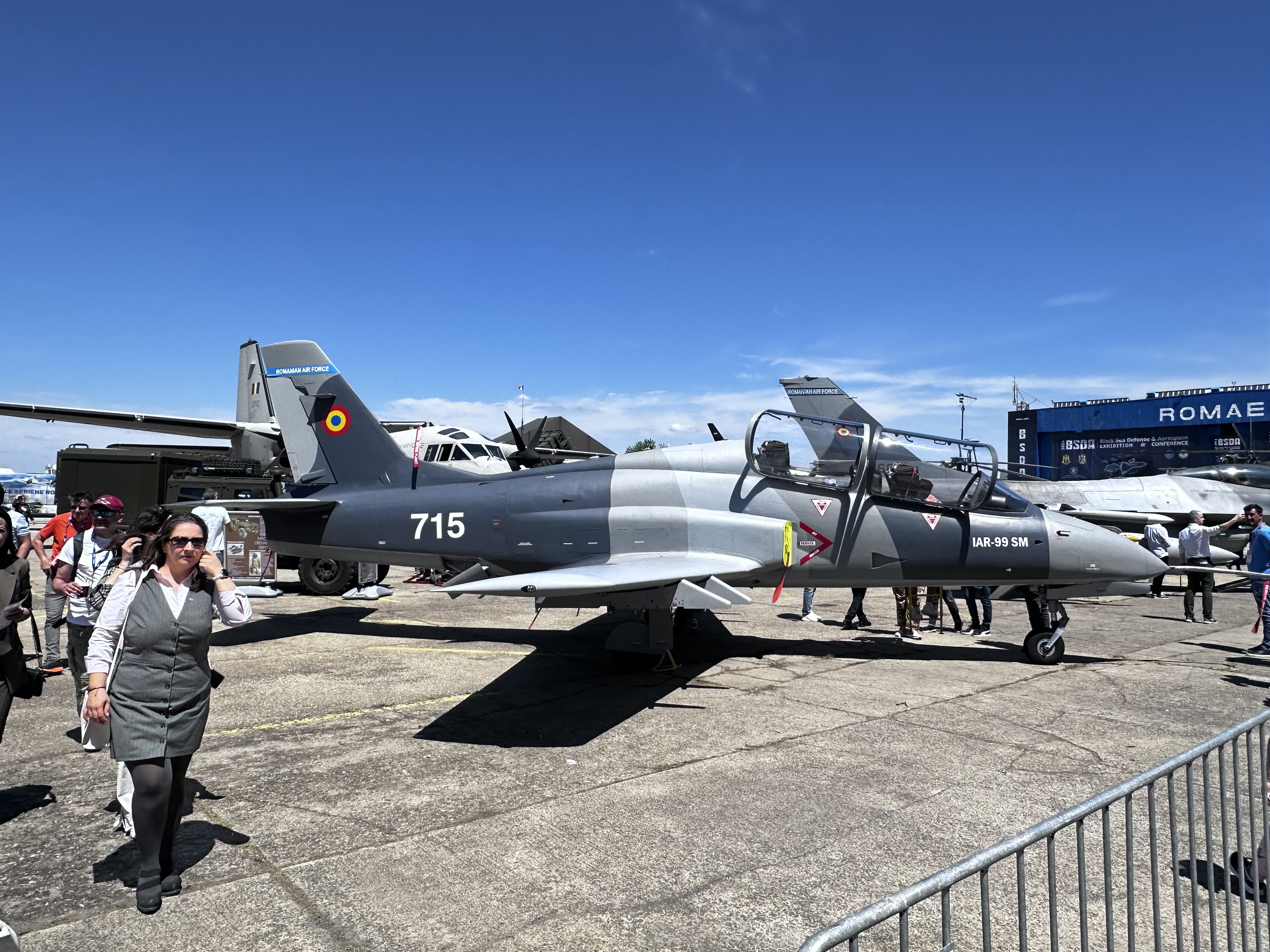
IAR-99SM, number 715, on static display at BSDA 2024.

Modernized Standard variant designed as a lead-in trainer for the F-16 and F-35.

- IAR-99SR "Șoim Revitalizat"
Modernized C variant designed as a light-attack aircraft with air-to-air capabilities.

== Operators ==
=== Current ===
Romania

- Romanian Air Force – 21 aircraft in service.

=== Proposed ===
Botswana

- Botswana Defence Force Air Arm Command – 10 aircraft were planned. In the early 1990s, Romania attempted to export the IAR-99 based on the IAR-109 Swift upgrade to Botswana. The proposed deal reportedly involved the sale of approximately ten aircraft. However, the acquisition was ultimately not approved by the parliament, and the export contract was never concluded.

Mauritania

- Mauritania Islamic Air Force – 2 aircraft were planned. Romania explored supplying two IAR-99 trainer aircraft as part of a broader package to Mauritania in the early 1990s that also included six IAR-93 Vultur aircraft configured for maritime patrol. The aircraft were intended for fisheries surveillance and maritime monitoring, with Mauritanian pilots and technicians reportedly planned to receive training in Romania. The proposal, which allegedly involved payment partly through fishing rights granted to Romanian ocean-fishing companies, was never finalized and the aircraft were not delivered.

== Notable accidents and incidents ==
- On 14 August 1986, aircraft number S-002 crashed. Lt. Col. Mihai Ionescu and Mj. Mitiță Stoica safely ejected.
- On 26 June 1990, aircraft number S-001: While training for an upcoming air show, during an inverted low level flight, the left wing clipped the air strip and crashed. Lt. Col. Ștefănel Vagner and Lt. Col. Mihai Ionescu died.
- On 24 February 1994, aircraft number 710 burned down on the ground. No injuries incurred.
- On 30 March 1995, aircraft number 714: a fuel line rupture caused a fire. Both occupants ejected safely.
- On 24 September 2004, aircraft number 721 (Șoim), suffered a bird strike to the cockpit with debris ingested by the engine. The crew attempted a crash landing and were badly injured upon impact, but recovered. The aircraft was written off.
- On 23 August 2012, aircraft number 718 (Standard) crashed shortly after takeoff during a training flight. The instructor in the back seat ejected safely, suffering serious injuries. The student died.
- On 16 July 2018, aircraft number 723 (Șoim), crashed after both occupants ejected safely. Onlookers report smoke coming from the aircraft before the crash.

== Specifications ==
Data from Avioane Craiova SA, Jane's all the World's Aircraft 2004-05

General characteristics

- Crew: 2
- Length: 11.01 m (36 ft 1 in)
- Wingspan: 9.85 m (32 ft 4 in)
- Height: 3.9 m (12 ft 10 in)
- Wing area: 18.71 m^{2} (201.4 sq ft)
- Aspect ratio: 5.2
- Airfoil: NACA 64_{1}A-214 (modified)
- Empty weight: 3,200 kg (7,055 lb) equipped
- Max takeoff weight: 4,400 kg (9,700 lb) Trainer; 5,560 kg (12,260 lb) Ground attack
- Fuel capacity: Internal:1,370 L (360 US gal; 300 imp gal); External:up to 450 L (120 US gal; 99 imp gal) (in 225 L (59 US gal; 49 imp gal) drop tanks)
- Powerplant: 1 × Turbomecanica/Rolls-Royce Viper Mk632-41M turbojet, 17.79 kN (4,000 lbf) thrust

Performance

- Maximum speed: 865 km/h (537 mph, 467 kn) trainer, clean
- Maximum speed: Mach 0.76
- Range: 1,100 km (680 mi, 590 nmi) Trainer with internal fuel; Ground attack with internal fuel 967 km (601 mi; 522 nmi)
- Combat range: 345 km (214 mi, 186 nmi) hi-lo-hi at 5,280 kg (11,640 lb)all-up weight
- Service ceiling: 12,900 m (42,300 ft)
- g limits: +7 / -3.6
- Rate of climb: 35 m/s (6,900 ft/min) at Sea level
- Wing loading: 235.2 kg/m^{2} (48.2 lb/sq ft) Trainer; 297.2 kg/m^{2} (60.9 lb/sq ft) Ground attack

Armament

- Guns: 1 × 23 mm Gryazev-Shipunov GSh-23L autocannon (ventral gun pod)
- Hardpoints: 4 underwing hardpoints capable of holding 250 kg each and 1 central hardpoint capable of holding 400 kg with a capacity of up to 450 kg (990 lb) of stores (the underwing hardpoints are wet capable of carrying 225l drop tanks)
- Rockets:
  - LPR 57
- Missiles:
  - R-60 air-to-air missile
  - Python AAM
  - R.550 Magic AAM
- Bombs:
  - BE-50 general-purpose bomb
  - BE-100 GP bomb
  - BEM-250 GP bomb
  - Mk 81 GP bomb
  - Mk 82 GP bomb
  - Elbit Opher infrared-guided bomb

== See also ==
Aircraft of comparable role, configuration, and era

- Aermacchi MB-339 - same engine and role
- Aero L-39 Albatros
- Aero L-59 Super Albatros
- BAE Systems Hawk
- FMA IA 63 Pampa
- Mikoyan MiG-AT
- PZL I-22 Iryda
- Soko G-4 Super Galeb
- Kawasaki T-4
- CASA C-101
