= IAR-93 Vultur =

Romanian ground-attack/interceptor aircraft

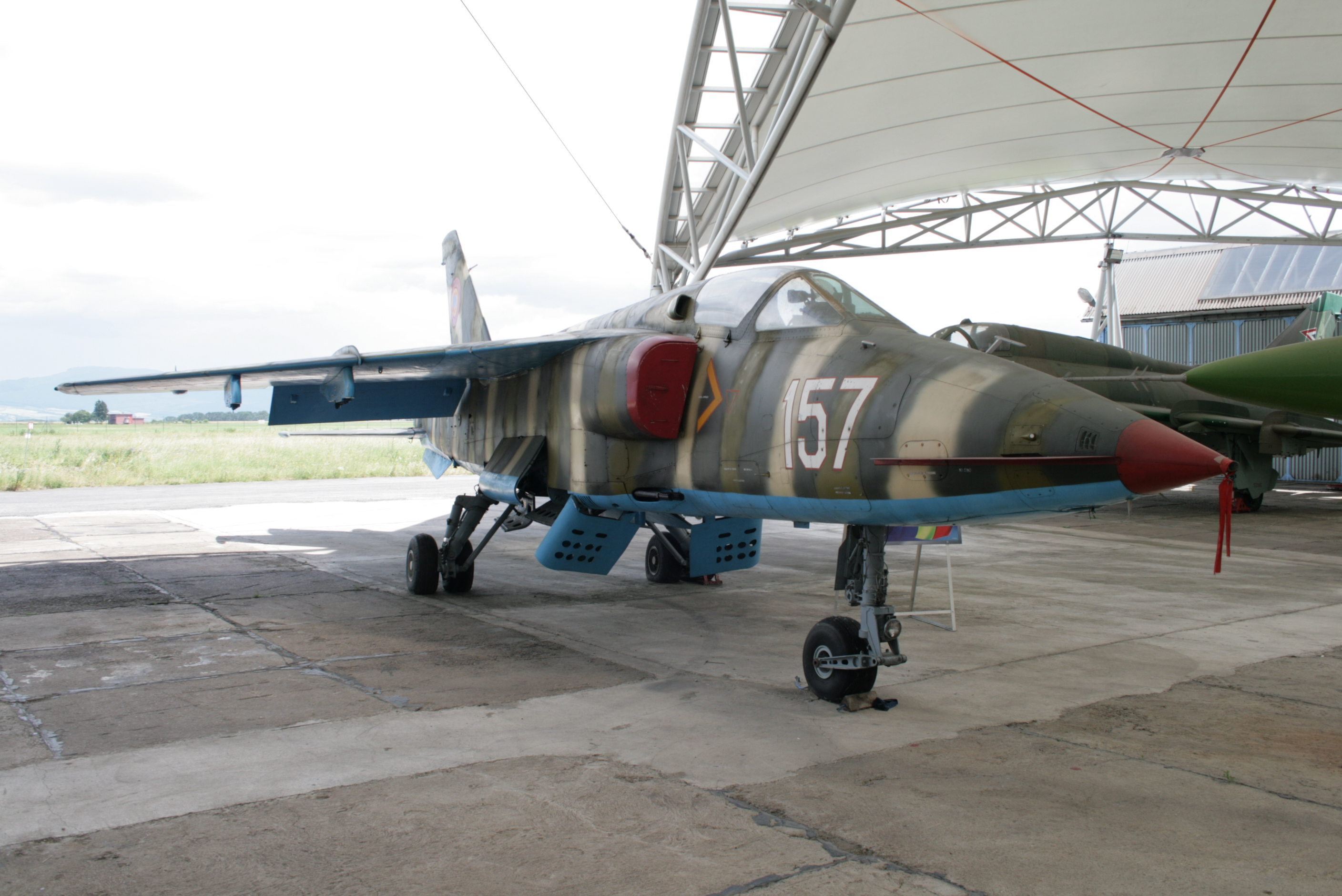
- IAR-93

General information
- Type: Ground attack aircraft Low level interceptor
- Manufacturer: Avioane Craiova
- Designer: INCAS Romania; VTI Yugoslavia
- Primary user: Romanian Air Force
- Number built: 87

History
- Manufactured: 1975–1992
- Introduction date: 1975
- First flight: October 31, 1974
- Retired: April 9, 1998
- Variant: Soko J-22 Orao

The Avioane Craiova IAR-93 Vultur (vulture/eagle) is a twinjet, subsonic, close support, ground attack and tactical reconnaissance aircraft with secondary capability as low level interceptor. Built as single-seat main attack version or combat capable two-seat version for advanced flying and weapon training, it was developed in 1970s by Romania and Yugoslavia to become more independent from Soviet equipment. The Romanian aircraft were built by I.R.Av. Craiova as IAR-93, and its Yugoslav counterpart by Soko as the Soko J-22 Orao. For Romania, the IAR-93 was intended to replace MiG-15s and MiG-17s in the fighter-bomber role.

== Development ==
On May 20, 1971, Romania and Yugoslavia signed the governmental agreements for the YuRom R&D programme. The program managers were Dipl. Dr. Engineer Teodor Zamfirescu for the Romanian party and Colonel Vidoje Knežević for the Yugoslav party.

The requirements called for a light subsonic aircraft for ground attack and tactical reconnaissance missions and with low level air combat as a secondary capability. It was to be built on a simple structure, using locally produced equipment and avionics (but compatible with Western components), tough (able to operate on grass or damaged runways), easy to maintain, and reliable. The aircraft was of conventional twin-engine, high mounted wing monoplane configuration with all flying surfaces swept. The Rolls-Royce Viper was chosen as the powerplant, as SOKO had experience with licence-building this engine. It was originally intended that an afterburner would be developed for the Viper engines, but there were prolonged difficulties with this project, meaning that none of the pre-production aircraft featured it, and neither did early production examples. During the 1980s, both countries developed slightly different versions to take advantage of the afterburning engines that had since become available.

== Flight testing ==
The Romanian single-seat prototype White 001 made its first flight, which lasted 21 minutes, on October 31, 1974, at Bacău (simultaneously with the Yugoslav prototype at Batajnica Air Base). The aircraft was flown by Colonel Gheorghe Stănică. On September 20, 1979, the plane was lost when, during a test flight, both engines stopped, and the pilot ejected. This prompted modifications to the combustion chamber (including all aircraft already delivered).

On July 18, 1975 the aircraft was presented to Nicolae Ceauşescu on the Bacău airfield.

The DC (two-seat) prototype #003 first flew on January 23, 1977, and was lost on November 24, 1977, due to tail flutter. The left elevator broke off while in level flight at 500 metres (1,600 ft) altitude and 1,045 kilometres per hour (649 mph). The Martin-Baker Mk RU10J zero-zero ejection seats functioned well and the two test pilots ejected safely. After this event the aft fuselage structure was reinforced.

Prototype #004 crashed at Craiova Air Base on February 20, 1979, during an aerobatics demonstration. The pilot, Capt. Eng. Dobre Stan, did not manage to eject.

On August 23, 1979, three IAR-93 (#001, #002 and #005) were first presented to the public in flight during the military parade celebrating the national day of Romania at that time.

== Variants ==
- IAR-93A: initial production version with non-afterburning Viper Mk 632-41 turbojets
  15 pre-production aircraft delivered in 1979; entered service in 1981
  26 built (#109-119 pre-production, #150-164 series) as single-seaters and 9 DC (two-seat) trainers (#005-008 pre-production, #180-184 series)
- IAR-93MB: MB = Motor de Baza (basic engine). This version had the fuselage of the IAR-93B but used the non-afterburning engine of the IAR-93A
  delivered starting with 1982
  15 single-seaters built (#201-215)
- IAR-93B: refined version with afterburning Viper Mk 633-47 engines, increased internal fuel capacity, upgraded hardpoints and revised wing, including leading edge extensions. Also, the ventral fins, inboard wing fences and forward fuselage strakes were removed
  first flew in 1985; entered service in 1987
  27 built as single-seater (#200, #216-241) and 7 DC (#600-606)

== Operators ==
=== Former ===
Romania

- Romanian Air Force – 116 total of which 87 were in service (including prototypes), and the other 29 were left unfinished. Additional 125 were ordered in 1989. - 67th Fighter-Bomber Regiment at Craiova. - 49th Fighter-Bomber Regiment at Ianca.

=== Proposed ===
Iran

- Islamic Republic of Iran Air Force – 48 total planned. In 1988, Iran evaluated the purchase of the IAR-93B Vultur during the final phase of the Iran–Iraq War, after facing aircraft losses and difficulties maintaining its U.S. supplied fleet, which included the Grumman F-14 Tomcat, McDonnell Douglas F-4 Phantom II and the Northrop F-5, due to Western arms embargos. Negotiations took place for the possible acquisition of 48 IAR-93B aircraft, consisting of 24 aircraft taken from Romanian Air Force stocks and 24 newly manufactured examples. Iranian pilots reportedly visited Romania to test-fly the aircraft at Craiova, where they conducted evaluation flights and weapons trials using unguided bombs. Only minor modifications were planned for export aircraft, mainly involving changes to radio equipment and identification-friend-or-foe (IFF) systems. The project did not progress to delivery following the August 1988 ceasefire that ended the Iran–Iraq War. Later discussions on broader economic cooperation between the two countries took place during the December 1989 visit of Romanian president Nicolae Ceaușescu to Tehran, but the aircraft acquisition was never actually implemented.

Mauritania

- Mauritania Islamic Air Force – 6 total planned. A proposed export of the IAR-93 Vultur to Mauritania in the early 1990s. According to a few accounts, Romania explored a contract for six modified IAR-93 aircraft intended for maritime patrol and fisheries surveillance, along with two IAR-99 Șoim trainer aircraft and training for Mauritanian personnel. The aircraft were reportedly to be equipped with surveillance equipment for monitoring illegal fishing in Mauritanian territorial waters. The proposed agreement, valued at approximately US$40 million, allegedly involved a mixed payment structure combining cash with fishing rights granted to Romanian ocean-fishing companies operating off the Mauritanian coast. The deal, reportedly negotiated through the Romanian state arms export agency Romtehnica, was not concluded and the aircraft were never delivered.

== Lost aircraft ==
Data from Romanian press and partially from ejection-history.org.uk

- #002, November 24, 1977 The left elevator broke off due to flutter. Both pilots, Col. Gheorghe D. Stanica and Col. Petru Ailiesei, ejected safely.
- #003, February 20, 1979 at Craiova Air Base. Capt. Eng. Dobre Stan did not manage to eject.
- #001, September 20, 1979 Both engines stopped. Col. Ilie P. Botea ejected safely.
- #113, March 8, 1983 Crashed on landing due to pilot error. Maj. Ion G. Tanase ejected safely.
- #602, August 25, 1992 Both pilots, Maj. Dan C. Cosaceanu and Cpt. Traian G. Neagoe, ejected safely.
- #200, November 26, 1996 at Recea-Slatina. Crashed during a test flight. Cpt. Cmdr. Matei "Bebe" Constantin ejected safely.
- #210, July 9, 1997 at Craiova Air Base. Exploded on the runway during preparations for Romanian-made cluster munitions testing. 16 ground personnel died. The pilot, Cmdr. Ion Marculescu, had not yet approached the plane and was unharmed.
- #219, April 9, 1998 at Ghercesti, near Craiova. The forward landing gear could not be deployed after a test flight. Cmdr. Ion Marculescu ejected safely after exhausting the fuel and the airplane crashed a few km further. This was the last flight for the type.

== Retirement ==
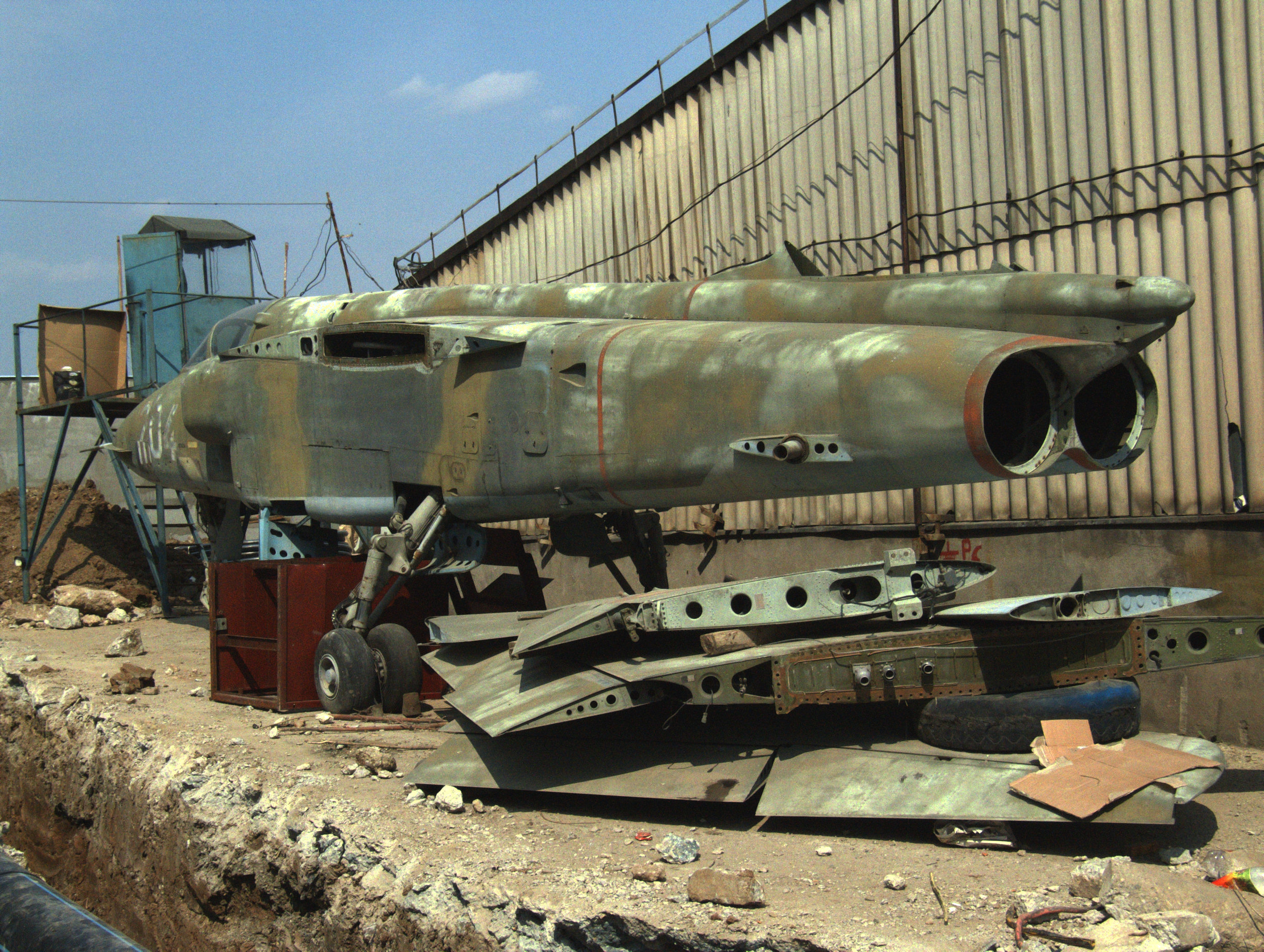
Dismantled IAR-93 MB #204

Following the outbreak of the war in Yugoslavia and the UN embargo, the IAR-93 program ended in Romania in 1992, with several airframes in different stages of construction. Around 75 aircraft were still in service, a few of them being used for testing and research (#200 – first B model with afterburners, #600 (DC) – the only one fitted with canards).

The last IAR-93s were withdrawn and mothballed from the Romanian Air Force in 1998. Surviving airframes were stored at Deveselu (IAR-93A #116), Timișoara (IAR-93MB #214), and Craiova (about 60 aircraft).

The J-22 Orao are still in service with the air force of Serbia. The last Yugoslav aircraft was delivered in February 1992, and the plant in Mostar was destroyed shortly after.

== Aircraft on display ==
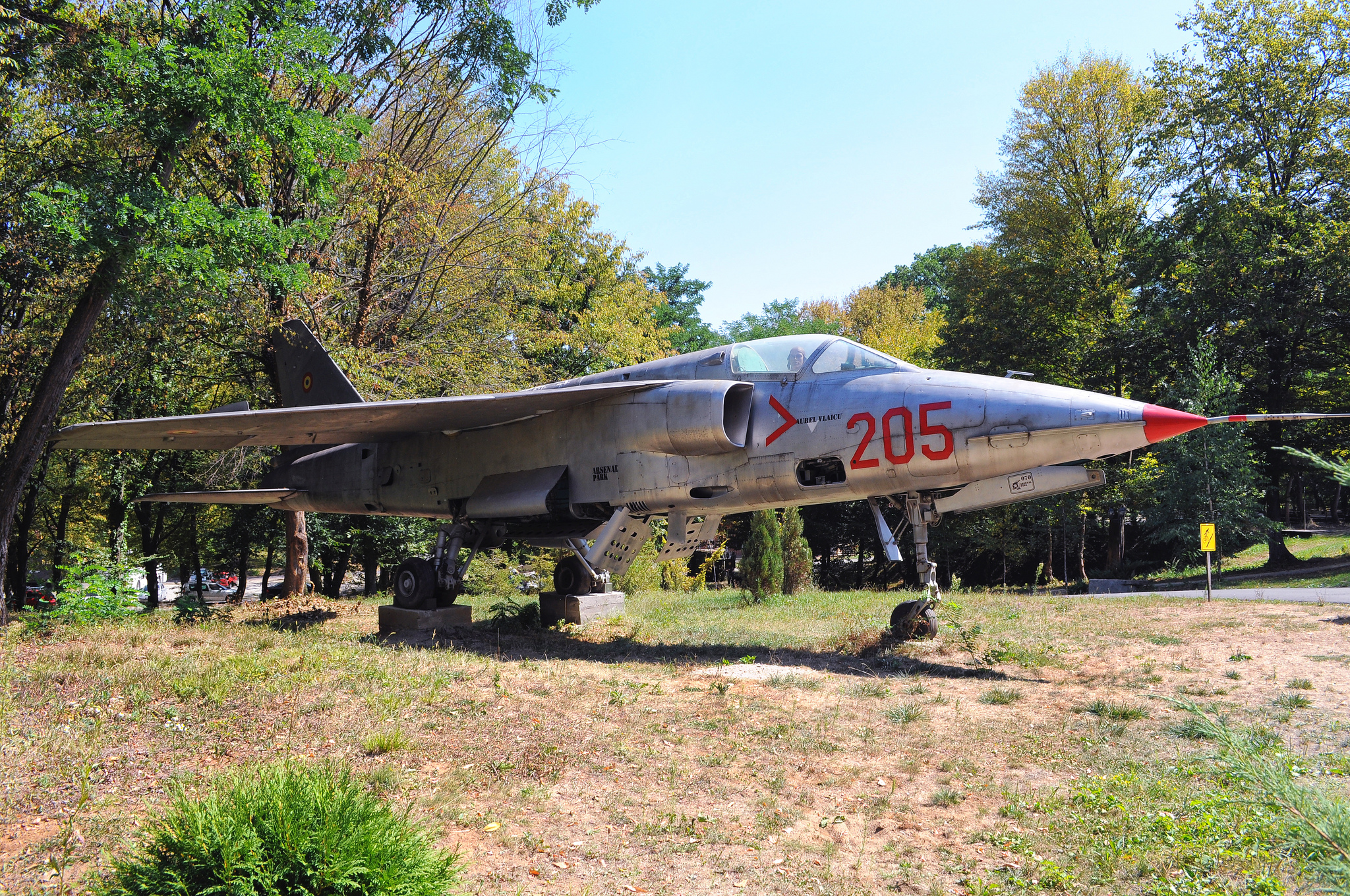
IAR-93 #205 on display in Orăștie (Arsenal Park).

- #002 (prototype DC) Aviation Museum, Bucharest (44°28'39.7"N 26°06'41.8"E)
- #109 (A) Henri Coandă School courtyard, Perișor, Dolj
- #112 (A) Aviation Museum, Bucharest (44°28'39.8"N 26°06'42.2"E)
- #114 (A) Aviation Museum, Bucharest (44°28'38.9"N 26°06'40.9"E)
- #153 (A) at the National Military Museum, Bucharest (44°26'25.3"N 26°04'36.4"E)
- #157 (A) donated by the Romanian Air Force to the Museum of Aviation in Košice, Slovakia on October 23, 2006
- #159 (A) in Bucharest, at the gate of I.N.C.A.S./Comoti Institut (the birthplace of IAR 93 and IAR 99) (44°26'03.5"N 26°00'21.3"E)
- #182 (A) Aviation Museum, Bucharest (44°28'38.5"N 26°06'39.7"E)
- #201 (MB) in Timișoara, on the road to Resita (45°43'8.27"N 21°11'58.77"E)
- #205 (MB), #207, #208 (August 2022) in Orăștie, at Arsenal Park (45°50'02.7"N 23°09'52.7"E)
- #206 (MB) in Pivka Military History Park, Pivka, Slovenia
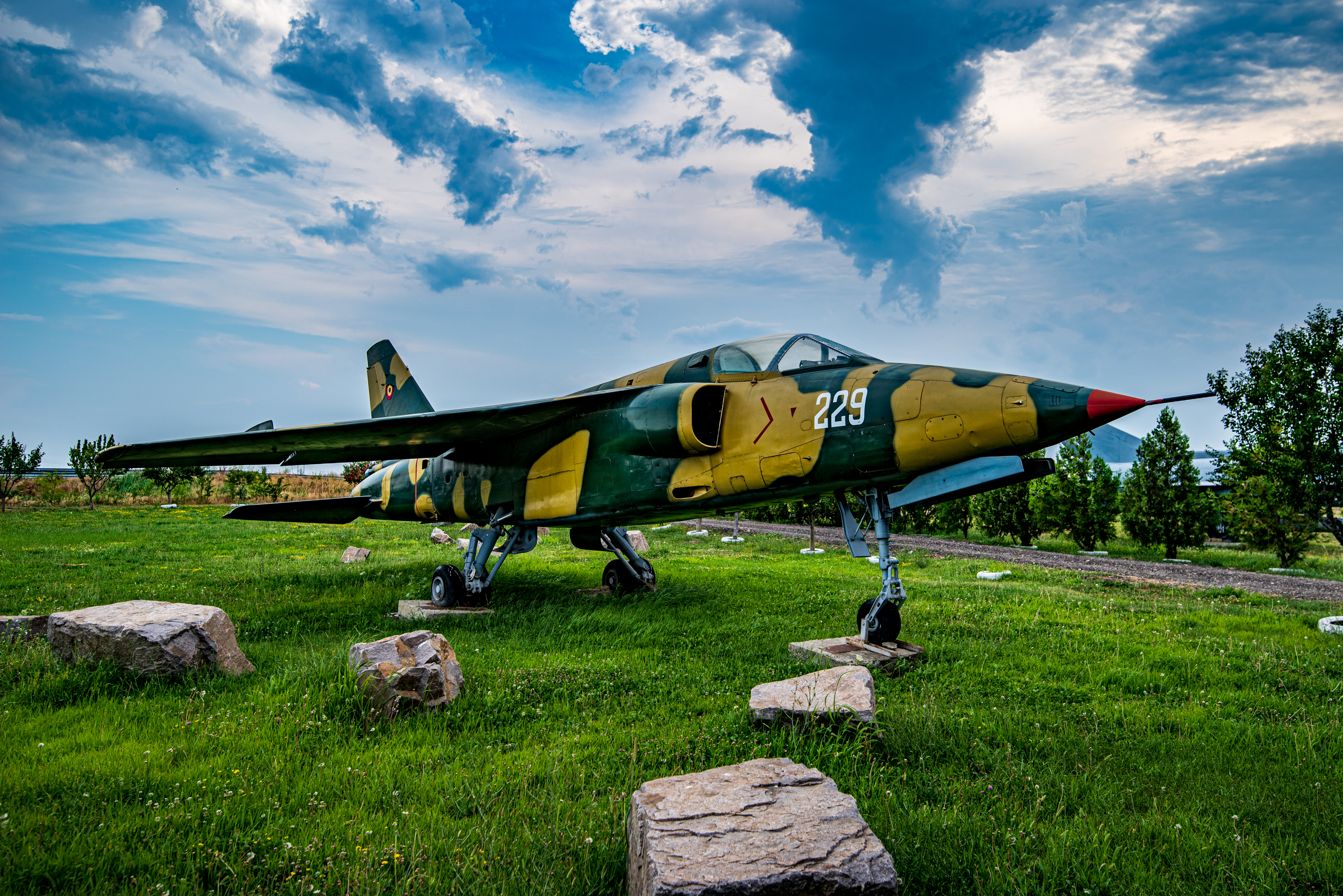
- IAR 93 on display at Vădeni Airfield
  #207 (MB) in Timișoara (45°44'4.65"N 21°15'49.65"E)
- #215 (MB) Colonești, Olt (44°38'01.3"N 24°40'41.2"E)
- #216 (MB) Bălăbănești, Galați (46°05'22.1"N 27°43'04.6"E)
- #223 (B) Gagu, Dascălu, (44°36'43.4"N 26°15'36.1"E)
- #229 (B) Vădeni, Brăila (45°21'46.572" N 27°56'22.716" E)
- #232 (B) in the Military Technical Academy's courtyard, Bucharest
- #600 (DC) in the Air Force Academy's courtyard, Brașov
- #613 (MB) in front of the Craiova International Airport (44°18'46.2"N 23°53'5.05"E)
- #220 in front of Facultatea de mecanica "Gheorghe Asachi", Iasi
- #181 in Ianca DN2B 247
- #222 in Aerodrom Șiria, Arad (46° 15' 50.11497" N 21° 36' 12.01636" E)

== Specifications (IAR-93B) ==
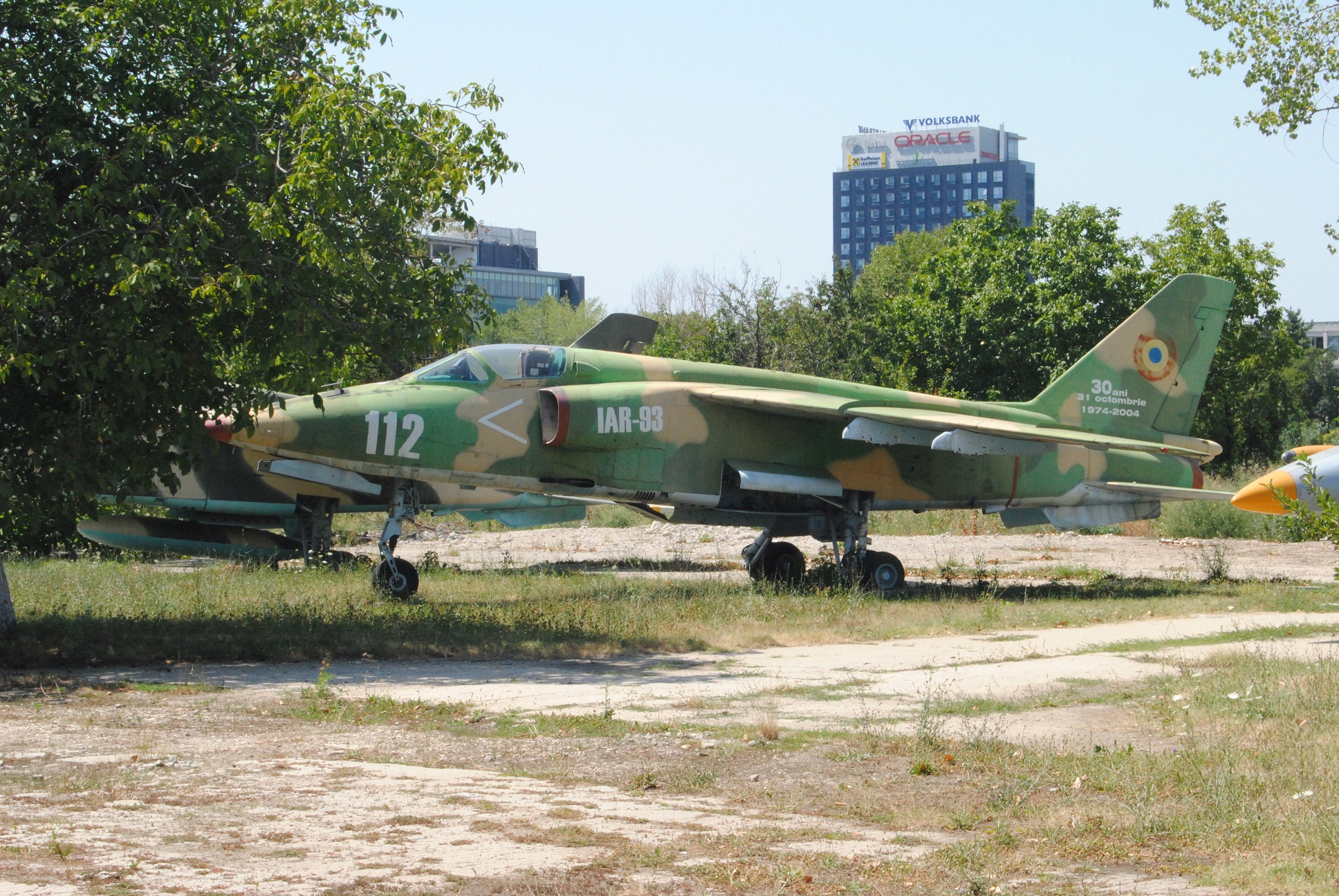
IAR 93 at the Aviation Museum in Bucharest

Data from International Air Power Review Vol.3, INCAS - IAR 93 SOKO /VTJ - J - ORAO

General characteristics

- Crew: 1
- Length: 14.9 m (48 ft 11 in) single-seat

15.38 m (50 ft) two-seats

- Wingspan: 9.3 m (30 ft 6 in)
- Height: 4.52 m (14 ft 10 in)
- Wing area: 26 m^{2} (280 sq ft)
- Aspect ratio: 3.33
- Airfoil: NACA 65A-008 mod.
- Empty weight: 5,750 kg (12,677 lb)
- Gross weight: 8,400 kg (18,519 lb)
- Max takeoff weight: 10,900 kg (24,030 lb)
- Maximum landing weight: 9,360 kg (20,635 lb)
- Fuel capacity: 2,400 kg (5,291 lb)
- Powerplant: 2 × Turbomecanica/Orao-built Rolls-Royce Viper Mk 633-47 afterburning turbojet engines, 17.79 kN (4,000 lbf) thrust each dry, 22.24 kN (5,000 lbf) with afterburner

Performance

- Maximum speed: 1,086 km/h (675 mph, 586 kn) at sea level
- Maximum speed: Mach 0.9
- Cruise speed: 1,087 km/h (675 mph, 587 kn) / M0.88 at 5,000 m (16,000 ft)
- Stall speed: 274 km/h (170 mph, 148 kn)
- Combat range: 260 km (160 mi, 140 nmi) lo-lo-lo with four rocket launchers, 5 min over target

380 km (240 mi; 210 nmi) hi-hi-hi patrol with three 500 litre drop tanks, 45 min over target
450 km (280 mi; 240 nmi) lo-lo-hi with two rocket launchers, six 100 kg bombs and one 500 litre drop tank, 10 min over target
530 km (330 mi; 290 nmi) hi-hi-hi with four 250 kg bombs and one 500 litre drop tank, 5 min over target

- Service ceiling: 13,600 m (44,600 ft)
- g limits: +8 -4.2
- Rate of climb: 65 m/s (12,800 ft/min)
- Wing loading: 419.2 kg/m^{2} (85.9 lb/sq ft)
- Thrust/weight: 0.417
- Take-off run: 800 m (2,600 ft)
- Take-off run to 15 m (49 ft): 1,150 m (3,770 ft)
- Landing run: 1,050 m (3,440 ft)

690 m (2,260 ft) with brake parachute

- Landing run from 15 m (49 ft): 1,520 m (4,990 ft)

1,520 m (4,990 ft) with brake parachute

Armament

- Guns: 2 × 23 mm Gryazev-Shipunov GSh-23L autocannons in lower front fuselage, below engine air intakes, with 200 rounds per gun; gun camera and GEC-Marconi D282 gyro gunsight installed. An additional centerline 23 mm GSh-23L cannon pod could be mounted
- Hardpoints: up to 2,500 kg (5,511 lb) on 5 pylons
- Rockets:
  - LPR 2-122 launcher for PRND-122 rockets
  - LPR 57-16 (UB-16)/LPR 57-32 (UB-32) rocket pod for S-5 rockets
  - PRN 80
- Missiles:
  - Air-to-air missiles:
    - K-13 (license-built in Romania as A-91) – (only on some IAR-93B)
- Bombs:
  - BE-50 general-purpose bomb
  - BE-100/BEF-100
  - BM-250/BEM-250
  - BA-500/BE-500/BM-500

Avionics

- VHF/UHF air-to-air and air-to-ground radio (20W transmission power)
- gyro unit (Honeywell SGP500 twin-gyro platform in ORAO)
- radio altimeter
- ADF
- radio compass and marker receiver
- IFF (IAR-93B only)
- GEC-Marconi three-axis stability augmentation system, incorporating a basic bank/altitude hold autopilot and emergency wings-level facility
- IAR 93 Modernization Project In 1992, a proposal was made to modernize IAR 93, with plane no. 605.The avionics was produced by the Collins (USA) company and included an inertial navigation system, new modern sighting, two displays.

== See also ==
Related development

- Soko J-22 Orao

Aircraft of comparable role, configuration, and era

- AMX
- Dassault/Dornier Alpha Jet
- Mikoyan MiG-27
- Mitsubishi F-1
- SEPECAT Jaguar
- Xian JH-7
