= Lino Zanussi =

Italian businessman

Lino Zanussi (Pordenone, 15 February 1920 - San Sebastián, 18 June 1968) was an Italian businessman and appliance manufacturer.

== Company history ==
=== Beginnings ===
Antonio Zanussi (Lino's father) was the son of a blacksmith. At the age of 26, in 1916, when the economy of Pordenone was still largely agricultural, he opened a small workshop where he began making stoves and ovens. He sold his products under the brand name "Rex". By 1920, when Lino was born, the "Workshop Antonio Zanussi" had 10 workers and launched a product that was initially created for export: the AZP (Antonio Zanussi Pordenone), the first wood-burning oven made of molded iron.

=== Lino takes charge ===
When Antonio died on 21 November 1946, the company had one hundred employees. Lino and his brother Guido took over the company. At first, they decided to produce for the domestic market. Having received an education in business by his father, Lino developed the company, making it a major European producer of appliances. By 1962, it had surpassed its German competitors to become the largest company in Europe producing gas and electric stoves, gas rings, washing machines, dishwashers and refrigerators domestically marketed under the "Rex" and "Naonis" brand names (export models were always branded "Zanussi"). In 1960, the company also began making televisions under the brand name "Seleco". The company's business model, according to Lino Zanussi, is "... To sell we need to produce a better quality with lower costs, if we don't have one of these two requirements, we lose the market .... " At the time of Zanussi's death, the company had 13,000 employees in 13 factories. Since then, other companies have been acquired which now make up the Zanussi Group.

== Achievements and accolades ==
Zanussi participated in creating the CUOA Foundation at the University of Padua. In the spring of 1963, the University gave him an honorary degree in industrial engineering. On the 21 of October 1966, President Giuseppe Saragat with the Minister of Industry Giulio Andreotti in the Zanussi factory in Porcia, said:

"When we talk of our Nation, we have to think about life in our country. Our nation's life is linked to the past and projected into the future, but is represented by people living today. And living in its noblest form is work. It is more than creating wealth: Work is the greatest creator of the moral forces on which civil society is founded "

== Zanussi's philosophy ==
Zanussi advocated this concept of work as a source of morality and civilization. His idea of enterprise is a severe but not paternalistic control, modern and rational, directed toward globalization of markets (with a dominant presence in the European market, with constant attention to assimilating technical and managing know-how, and with a strategy oriented towards the Eastern European countries), the company must create wealth for employees and for the local territory, developing it from a social and cultural point of view.

== Death ==
On 18 June 1968, a Piaggio PD.808 demonstration aircraft I-PIAI crashed in bad weather when it flew into the side of Mount Jaizkibel, near San Sebastian, Spain. All six on board, including Zanussi, were killed.
