= 53rd Fighter Squadron "Warhawks" =

Military unit

53rd Fighter Squadron
- Escadrila 53 Vânătoare
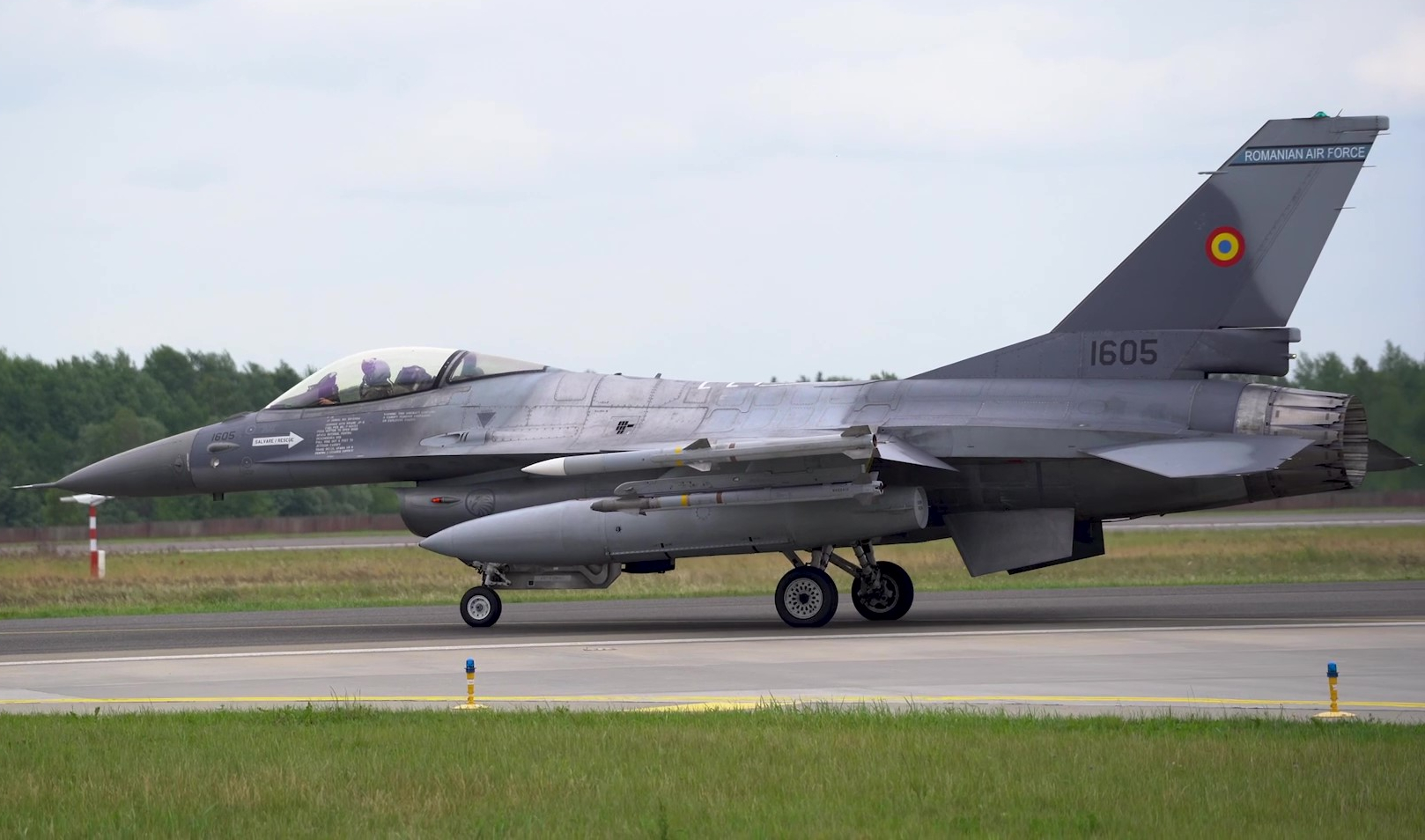
- F-16 of Escadrila 53 Vânătoare conducting an alpha scramble as part of the Baltic Air Policing at Šiauliai
- Active: 1 June 1940 – 15 December 1944; 29 September 2016 – present
- Country: Romania
- Branch: Romanian Air Force; Royal Romanian Air Force
- Type: Squadron
- Role: Fighter
- Size: 17 F-16AM/BM (current)
- Garrison/HQ: RoAF 86th Air Base (Baza 86 Aeriană), Borcea, Călărași County
- Nickname: Warhawks
- Mottos: We prey, they pray
- Equipment: World War II: Hawker Hurricane; IAR 80A; Messerschmitt Bf 109E-3; Messerschmitt Bf 109G; Present: F-16AM/BM Block 15 MLU
- Engagements: Second World War: Eastern Front; Operation München; First Jassy–Kishinev offensive; Western Allied campaign in Romania; Operation Tidal Wave

Commanders
- Current commander: Comandor Mihăiță "Mitză" Marin

Insignia
- 53rd Fighter Squadron badge

The 53rd Fighter Squadron (Romanian: Escadrila 53 Vânătoare) is a squadron of the Romanian Air Force, first formed on 1 June 1940, then reactivated on 29 September 2016 at the 86th Air Base near Borcea. The squadron currently operates the F-16AM/BM fighter aircraft. During World War II, the 53rd Fighter Squadron participated in the defense of Dobrogea in 1941, and of the Ploiești oil fields in 1943, notably during Operation Tidal Wave. In 1944, the squadron was moved to the front in Western Moldavia and continued fighting until its disbanding on 15 December 1944. The squadron also scored the last officially registered victory over a Soviet aircraft shortly after King Michael's Coup.

In 2026, the reactivated 53rd Squadron recorded the first aerial victory of the Romanian Air Force since 1945 by shooting down a Ukrainian drone over Estonia. The same year, the squadron also shot down the first Russian drones over Romania.

== History ==
=== 1940 - 1941 ===
On 1 June 1940, Grupul 7 Vânătoare (7th Fighter Group) was activated within the Flotila 1 Vânătoare (1st Fighter Flotilla), with the base on the Pipera airfield, near Bucharest. The group consisted of the 53rd Squadron (equipped with the Hawker Hurricane) and the 57th Squadron (equipped with the Messerschmitt Bf 109E-3). At that time, the 7th Fighter Group was the best-equipped Romanian Air Force unit.

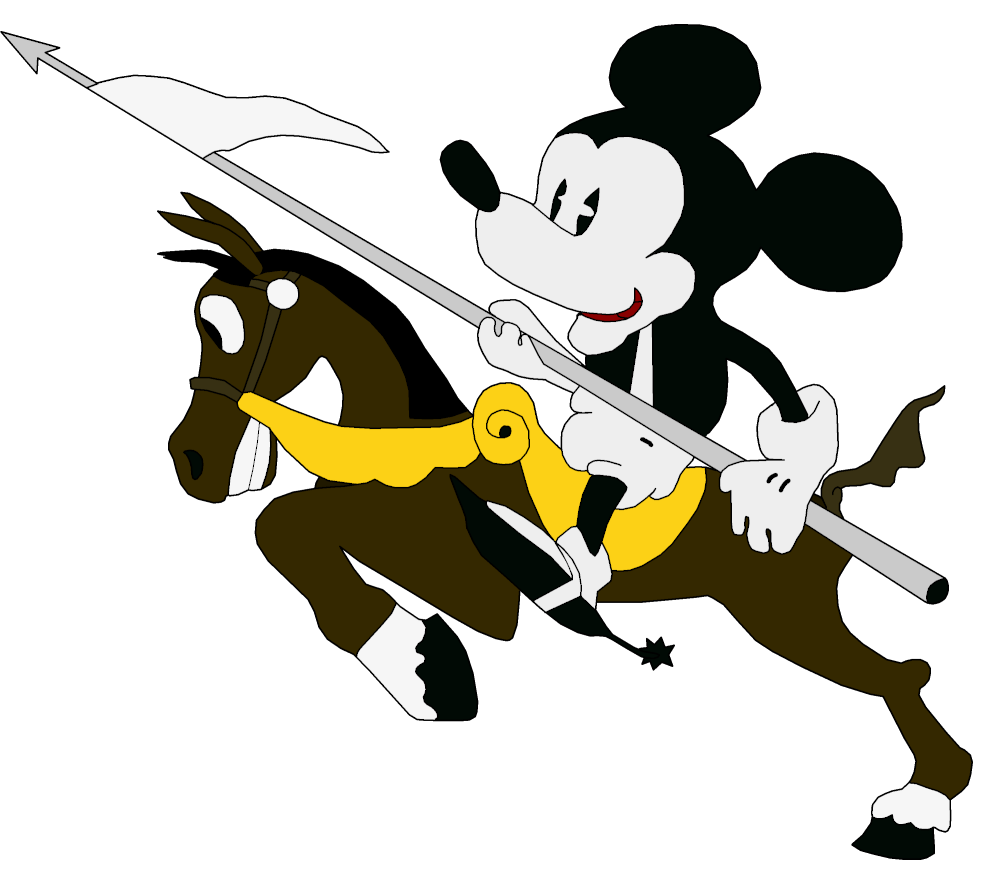
Emblem of the 53rd Fighter Squadron during World War 2, featuring Mickey Mouse.

The first deployment of the 7th Group took place on 11 June 1940 on the airfield of Florești. After Romania joined the Axis in the autumn of 1940, a German military mission arrived in the country. It included a German fighter group (I./JG 28), which began flying training missions with pilots from the 7th Fighter Group. On 10 October 1940, the 53rd Squadron moved to the Câmpia Turzii aerodrome, where it remained until 5 November. In November 1940, the instruction courses of the Romanian pilots with the Germans started on the Pipera airfield.

On 18 January 1941, the squadron was transferred to Grupul 5 Vânătoare (5th Fighter Group), being moved to Constanța, on the Mamaia airfield and assigned to the Dobrogea Aero Command. On 21 June 1941, one day before the start of the campaign, the 53rd Squadron was redeployed to the Buzău aerodrome, from where it was to accompany the Romanian bombers. However, a pilot of the 53rd Squadron remained at the Mamaia aerodrome, Lieutenant Horia Agarici, whose plane was under repair. In the hangars from Mamaia there was a second Hurricane, also under repair. The latter, having problems with engine overheating and could not be used in flight for long periods.

On 22 June 1941, the 53rd Squadron accompanied 10 PZL.37 Łoś bombers that attacked the airfield of Cetatea Albă. The pilots of the squadron managed to shoot down 4 enemy aircraft, with the loss of 2 bombers to ground fire. A day later Constanța was attacked by Ilyushin DB-3 bombers. After the first wave of bombers managed to hit the port, Lt. Horia Agarici took off in the Hurricane with engine overheating problems and managed to shoot down 3 bombers of the second wave before having to disengage in order to avoid destroying his engine. The same day, the squadron returned to Mamaia and managed to shoot down a further 2 DB-3s.

The defense of Dobrogea continued with Lieutenant Constantin "Bâzu" Cantacuzino being credited with a probable victory on 2 July 1941. The 53rd Squadron was visited and congratulated by General Ion Antonescu for the 25 victories obtained in five days of effective fighting. In the first 10 days of fighting, the pilots of the squadron obtained 32 confirmed and 3 unconfirmed victories, with no losses.

On 15 September 1941, a Hurricane patrol took off to accompany the airplane of Marshal Ion Antonescu, which was traveling to Nikolayev, where the funeral of General Eugen von Schobert, commander of the German 11th Army, was taking place. Once there, the Hurricane patrol flew over the funeral procession.

The number of air victories at the end of 1941 was 52 aircraft, with a single loss in battle.

=== 1942 - 1944 ===
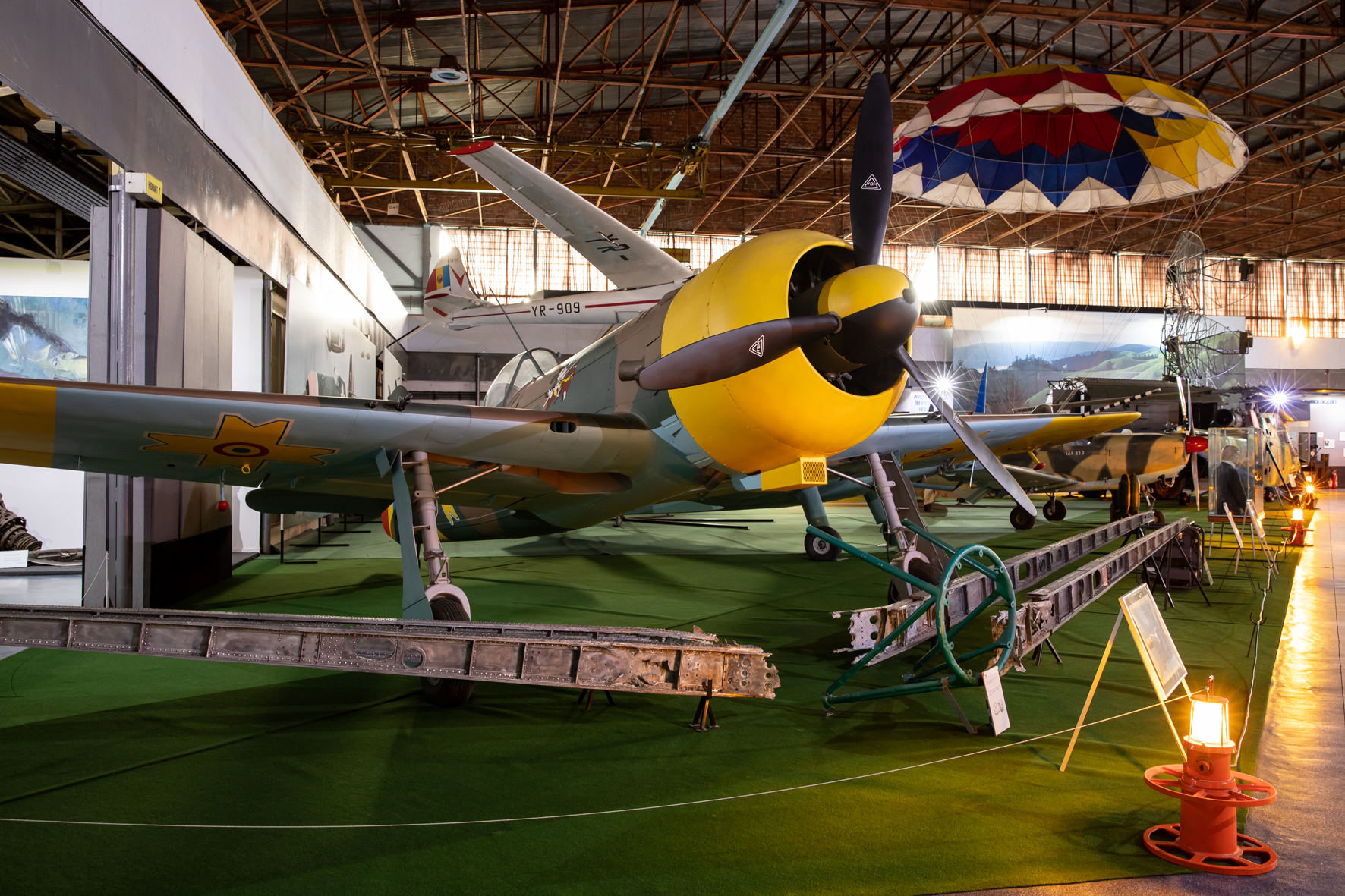
IAR 80 replica in the 53rd Fighter Squadron markings at the National Museum of Romanian Aviation

During 1942, the 53rd Squadron did not take part in further fighting on the Eastern Front. The squadron, which had been equipped with the Hawker Hurricane Mk. I, started converting to the IAR 80. Later, it converted again to the Bf 109E, finally being equipped with Bf 109G fighters. The squadron left the 5th Fighter Group and was assigned to the joint German-Romanian unit I./Jagdgeschwader 4 (JG 4) at Mizil, near Ploiești. The squadron was called 4./JG 4 by the Germans. During Operation Tidal Wave on 1 August 1943, the 53rd Squadron was credited with downing two B-24 bombers.

In 1944, the squadron was reintegrated into the 7th Fighter Group. The 7th Group engaged in two American air raids in April and downed three bombers. On 19 April, the 7th Fighter Group (with the 53rd and 57th Squadrons) was transferred to the front in Moldavia, under the command of the 1st Air Corps. The fighters started flying combat missions in the Târgu Frumos area on 22 April. Fighting intensified in May with the start of the Second Battle of Târgu Frumos, and the group registered a high number of sorties. The last mission on the front was flown on 30 May, by which time Grupul 7 had achieved 22 victories against the Soviet Air Forces. The 53rd Squadron, along with the 7th Group, returned to air defense duty against American air raids until 18 August. A few days before King Michael's Coup, the 7th Group relocated to Roman due to the start of the Soviet offensive. The squadron also scored the last victory over a Soviet aircraft when a Bf 109E shot down a Pe-2 on 24 August 1944, before the armistice could fully come into effect. Later that day, all fighter groups were called to the Popești-Leordeni airfield near Bucharest.

From 25 August, the 53rd Fighter Squadron aided in defending Bucharest against the German air raids during the attempted counter-coup. That day, Ofițer de echipaj clasa a III-a (Junior lieutenant) Ioan Maga distinguished himself by shooting down two German bombers and damaging a third one. On 28 August, Maga and his flight of Bf 109s strafed a column of about 150 German vehicles that were retreating from Otopeni. As a result, about 40 vehicles were destroyed, and the column was disorganized, allowing other Romanian units to capture the remaining German troops along with their commanders. For his actions, Ioan Maga was later decorated with the Order of Michael the Brave. He was assigned as the commander of the 53rd Squadron on 1 November 1944. On 15 December 1944, the 53rd Squadron was disbanded, together with the 56th and 57th Squadrons and the command of the 1st Fighter Flotilla.

=== 2016 - present ===
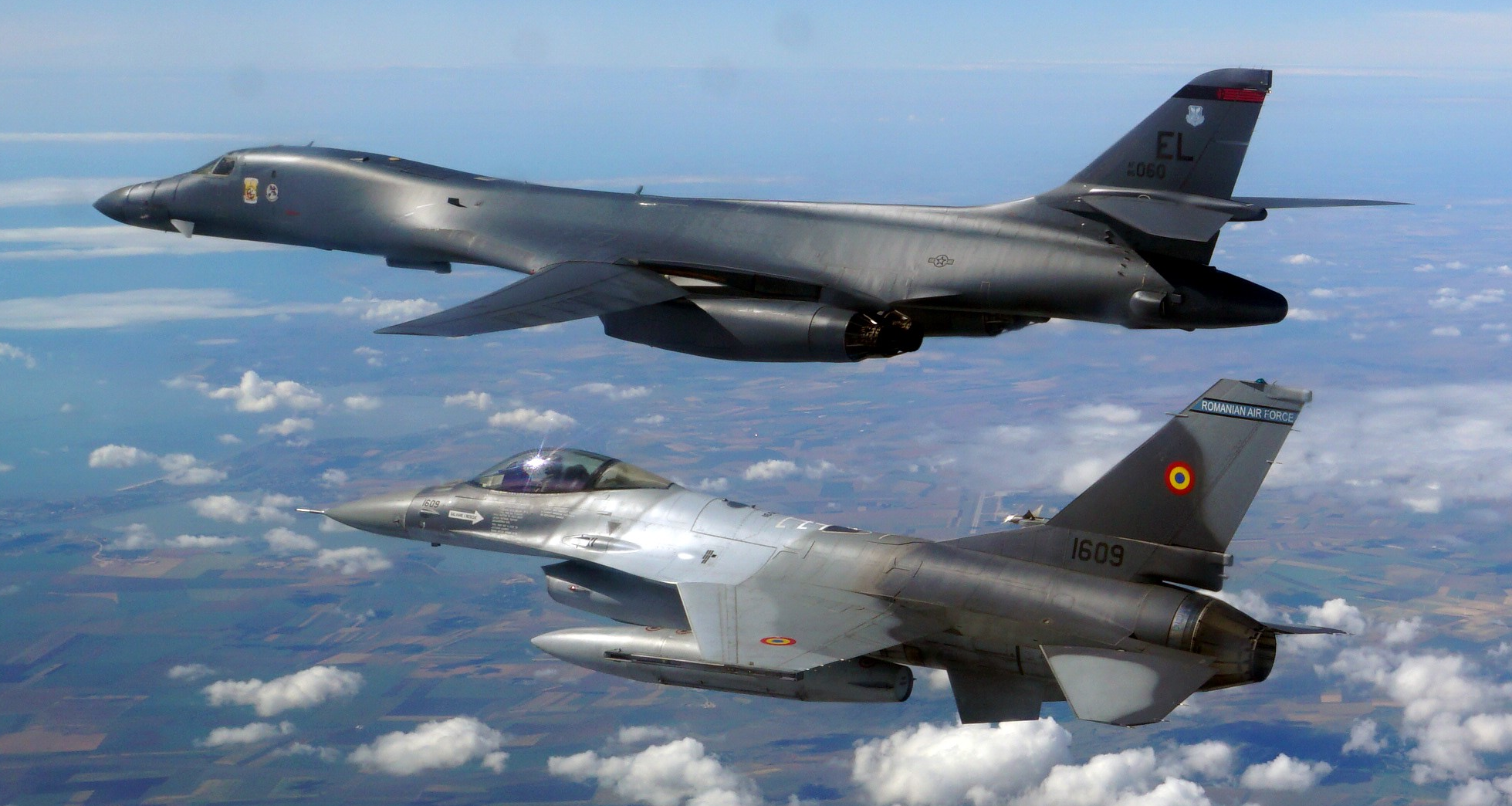
Romanian F-16 escorting B-1B Lancers of the 34th Bomb Squadron during the Bomber Task Force Europe 2020 mission

The 53rd Fighter Squadron was reactivated on 29 September 2016, with the arrival of the first F-16s from Portugal. The first pilots got their IOC in 2017, meaning the unit could start taking part in NATO air patrolling missions. In 2018, tasks were further expanded to include the full variety of tasks the F-16 can perform, and full operational capability was achieved a year later, with the unit beginning to perform air policing missions under national command. The squadron received its 17th F-16 on 25 March 2021.

Four F-16s of the fighter squadron, along with around 100 servicemen forming the Carpathian Vipers detachment, were deployed to the Šiauliai Air Base as part of the Baltic Air Policing mission on 31 March 2023. During their deployment from April to July, the Romanian fighters intercepted over 60 Russian aircraft in over 25 missions, the first of which happened on 7 April when two Romanian F-16s intercepted two Russian Sukhoi Su-27 Flankers flying in international airspace over the Baltic Sea. The detachment also participated in various multinational training exercises, including Air Defender 23. The detachment took part in the Baltic Air Policing mission again in 2025 and in 2026.

==== Russian invasion of Ukraine ====
On 24 February 2022, the starting day of the Russian invasion of Ukraine, two F-16s intercepted a Sukhoi Su-27 of the Ukrainian Air Force that was approaching Romanian airspace. The Su-27 was escorted to the 95th Air Base in Bacău.

On 19 May 2026, an F-16 from the 86th Air Base and part of the Carpathian Vipers detachment deployed to Šiauliai, piloted by Căpitan-Comandor Costel-Alexandru Pavelescu, shot down a Ukrainian drone over Estonia. The drone had entered Estonian airspace from Russia during an attack on the Saint Petersburg region. The pilot who shot down the drone was decorated in the aftermath of the incident.

An F-16 from the 86th Air Base shot down another drone over Romania on 24 July 2026. Identified as a Russian Geran-2, the drone crashed in a field between Padina and Pogoanele, in the Buzău County. This event marked the first time a drone was destroyed in Romanian airspace. Less than 24 hours later, another drone was shot down near Sfântu Gheorghe, Tulcea, by the same pilot who shot down the previous one. A third drone was shot down in Romania over the Black Sea on 26 July 2026.

Two Russian jet-powered Geran-4 drones were shot down by F-16s from the 86th Air Base on 17 October. Each drone was shot down by an F-16 within four minutes after entering Romanian airspace over the Black Sea east of Sulina.

== See also ==
- List of Romanian Air Force units

== Bibliography ==
- Moroșanu, Teodor Liviu; Melinte, Dan Alexandru (2010). Romanian Fighter Colors 1941-1945. MMP Books. ISBN 978-83-89450-90-6.
