= Doru Davidovici =

Romanian aviator and writer

- Born: Doru Filimon Davidovici; 6 July 1945; Bucharest, Kingdom of Romania
- Died: 20 April 1989 (aged 43) near Perișoru, Călărași County
- Military career
- Allegiance: Romania
- Branch: Romanian Air Force
- Service years: 1968–1989
- Rank: Lieutenant-colonel
- Unit: 86th Fighter Aviation Regiment
- Writing career
- Spouse: Agnes-Ruth Valentin
- Children: two children
- Genre: Fiction

Doru Davidovici (Romanian pronunciation: [ˈdoru daˈvidovit͡ʃʲ]; July 6, 1945 – April 20, 1989), was a Romanian aviator and writer. Born in a Romanian-Jewish family, Doru Davidovici became one of the most loved Romanian fiction writers in the 1980s. During the communist years, his books gave an unusual sense of liberty and new horizons by describing the experience of flying, and the closeness it forged – both between pilots and between pilots and their machines. The plane is seen by Davidovici not simply as a machine that enables one to fly but as an actual character, with its own personality and almost with its own soul.

== Biography ==
=== Early life and military career ===
Doru Filimon Davidovici was born on 6 July 1945 to Paul and Etti Davidovici. He attended the Higher School of Active Aviation Officers, graduating in 1967 with the rank of Lieutenant. He continued his studies at the Military Academy between 1977 and 1979.

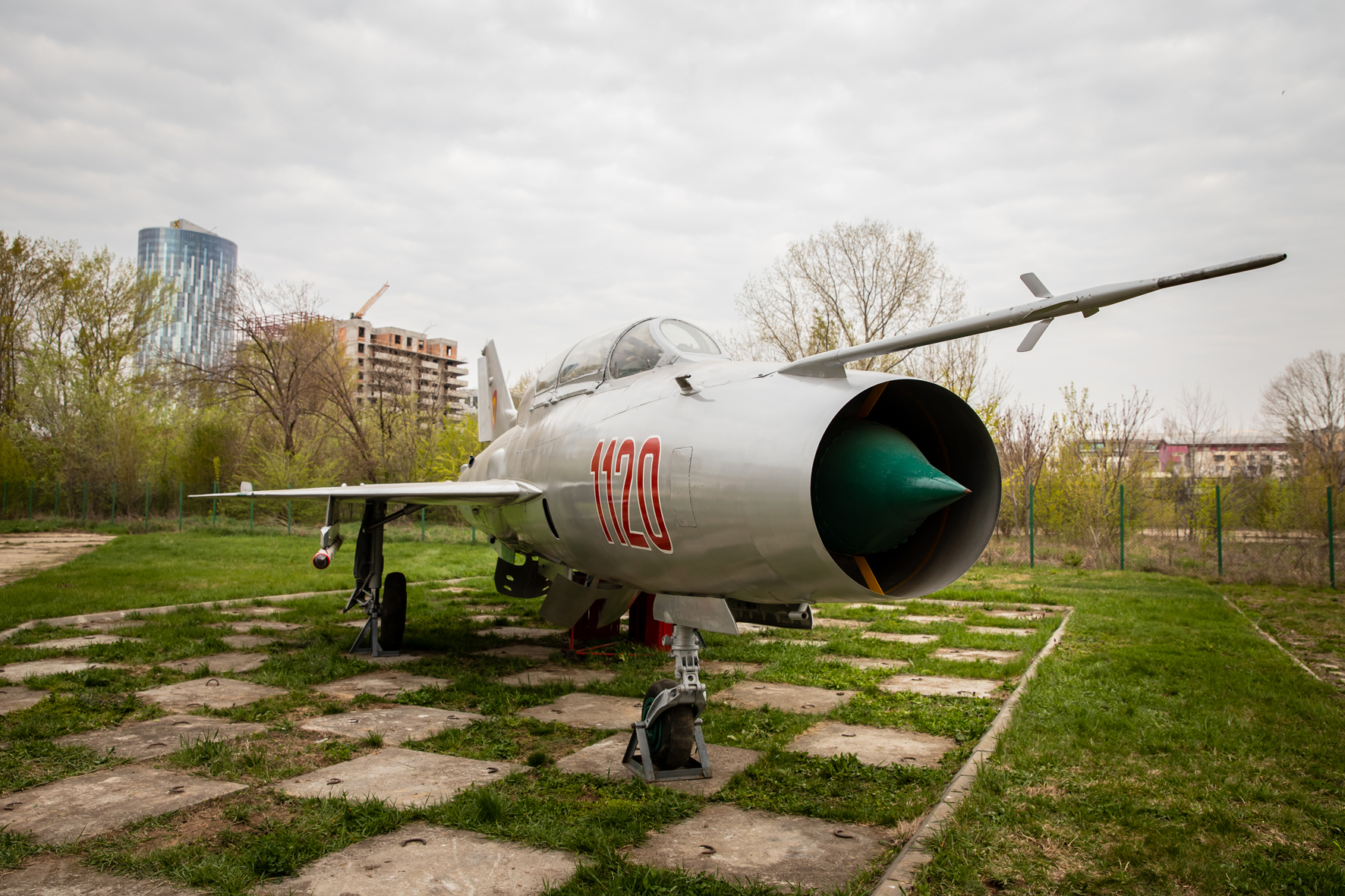
MiG-21 U-400 no. 1120 nicknamed "Bătrâna doamnă" ("Old lady"), one of the MiGs flown by Davidovici, displayed at the Museum of Romanian Aviation

After he completed his conversion training on supersonic fighters, he was assigned to the 86th Fighter Aviation Regiment in 1984 where he flew on MiG-21 aircraft. Between 1981 and 1986, he served in various roles such as patrol commander, squadron commander, and inspector in the Military Aviation Command. From 1986 until his death in 1989, he worked as an instructor on the MiG-21.

==== The cockpit incident ====
In 1974, soon after taking off on a mission, the canopy of his airplane broke off knocking him unconscious. When he woke up, the aircraft was diving towards a forest but soon he managed to regain control and bring the airplane to level flight. Under the instructions of his flight leader, he then began the process of landing.

While everything else was under control, he noticed a piece of the broken plexiglass still attached to the metal frame of the cockpit. Fearing it could tear off and hit him in the face, he grabbed the piece with his right hand while keeping the controls of the aircraft with his left hand. Unsuccessful in his attempt, and with an injured hand, he tried again with his other hand, eventually managing the tear off the piece. While on approach he tried to lower his visor, but his arm got twisted by the air current and flung backward, outside the cockpit, dislocating his shoulder. He managed to land the aircraft while his right arm was still twisted. Soon after landing, the medics managed to save his arm.

=== Writing career ===
He began his writing career in 1973, publishing the book titled Caii de la Voroneț ("The Horses of Voroneț"). With this book, he received the First prize at the publishing house's debut contest. His works soon gained popularity, giving readers a sense of liberty by describing the experiences of flying and presenting new horizons, and in other works of his presenting UFOs and aliens.

Davidovici’s books about flight were popular with aviators. It was reported young pilots would ask for autographs on his books while at the Air Base, with him signing them right on the wing of his MiG-21 RFMM.

=== Investigation by Securitate and censorship ===
Due to his family's close ties to Israel, he became a target for the Securitate. His father, Paul, had been investigated two times in 1953 and in 1963, while his mother, Etti, was arrested on suspicion of treason being released two years after her arrest. Davidovici's wife, Agnes, worked as a translator for Agerpres and had many contacts in Israel, West Germany, France, and the United States. Thus, both Doru (under the codename "Aron") and his wife were investigated by the secret police.

In 1987, the Securitate intercepted one of his letters to writer Cornel Marandiuc. In this letter, Doru complained that his newly released book Lumi Galactice was censored with "incompetent erasures and clumsy additions".

=== Later career ===
Sometime at the end of 1987, or the beginning of 1988, Davidovici wanted to leave military aviation and wished to become a pilot flying internal routes for TAROM. He was however denied this request.

=== Death and legacy ===
Doru Davidovici lost his life together with Dumitru Petra on 20 April 1989 during landing procedures while returning with his MiG-21UM from a training flight to the Borcea air base. The place where he crashed near the village of Perișoru (44°23′4.04″N 27°36′9.51″E) is marked with a pile of boulders.

His work was influenced by writers like Ray Bradbury, Radu Tudoran, and Bertolt Brecht. He is often compared with French aviator and writer Antoine de Saint-Exupéry. Both found a source of literary inspiration in their profession, and they both died, at about the same age, flying a fighter plane.

The MiG-21 modernization program, which later became known as the LanceR program, was initially called the "DD Program", meant as a tribute to Doru Davidovici.

Davidovici was married to Agnes-Ruth, née Valentin, and had two children, Irina and Ștefan.

== Literary works ==
His published works include:

- Caii de la Voroneț (1973)
- Ultima aventură a lui Nat Pinkerton (1975)
- Insula nevăzută (1976)
- Intrarea actorilor (1977)
- Zeița de oricalc (1977)
- Celula de alarmă (1979)
- Culoarea cerului (1981)
- Aripi de argint (1983)
- Lumi galactice (1986)
- V de la Victorie (1987)

=== Published posthumously ===
- Ridică-te și mergi (1991)
- Dezmințire la Mit (1991)

Besides his narrative work, Doru Davidovici is known for his essay on the UFOs, Lumi Galactice – colegii mei din neștiut (Galactic worlds – my colleagues from the unknown), published in 1986. Here Davidovici regards, once again through his pilot eyes, the UFOs and the issues raised by their presumed existence.
