= Adamescu =

Adamescu is a Romanian surname. Notable people with the surname include:

- Dan Adamescu (1948–2017), Romanian businessman, founder of The Nova Group

- Alexander Adamescu, son of Dan

- Gheorghe Adamescu (1869–1942), Romanian literary historian and bibliographer
- Vasile Adamescu (1944–2018), Romanian educator
