= Borcea =

- Commune
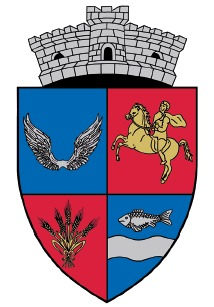
- Coat of arms

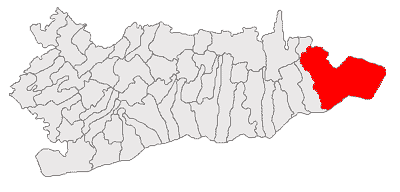
- Location in Călărași County

- Location in Romania
- Coordinates: 44°20′00″N 27°45′25″E
- Country: Romania
- County: Călărași
- Established: 1501 (first official record as Tamburești)

Government
  - Mayor (2020–2024): Theodor Aniel Nedelcu (PNL)
- Area: 385.82 km^{2} (148.97 sq mi)
- Highest elevation: 22 m (72 ft)
- Lowest elevation: 9 m (30 ft)
- Population (2021-12-01): 7,219
  - Density: 18.71/km^{2} (48.46/sq mi)
- Time zone: UTC+02:00 (EET)
  - Summer (DST): UTC+03:00 (EEST)
- Postal code: 917015
- Area code: +40 x42
- Vehicle reg.: CL
- Website: www.primariaborcea.ro

Borcea is a commune situated in the eastern part of Călărași County, Muntenia, Romania. It is one of the most populous communes in the county and it is situated on the west bank of the Borcea branch (a section of the Danube). The commune was formed as a result of the administrative reform of 1968 by joining two neighboring villages, Cocargeaua and Pietroiu. Today, it is composed of two villages, Borcea and Pietroiu.

The commune is home to the Romanian Air Force 86th Air Base.

== History ==
=== Antiquity ===
The oldest archaeological findings in Borcea date from III-IV BC and consist of ancient pottery, Macedonian amphorae and a silver drachma issued by the ancient city of Histria. The presence of numerous archaeological evidence in Borcea which originated from the Greek colonies in Dobruja lead to the conclusion that between Getic settlements that were strung along the Borcea branch and the Greek colonies there were cultural and economic exchanges. This layer of archaeological findings (III-IV B.C.) is covered by a Roman layer (II–IV A.D.) of pottery and other materials.

=== Middle Ages ===
The next archaeological layer (IX-XII A.D.) consists of evidence of medieval culture (coins and pottery). Because of the loss of many documents that relate to the beginning of medieval Romania, the first time Borcea is mentioned in an official document takes place only at the beginning of XVI century. On 15 December 1501, Prince Radu IV the Great of Wallachia issued a charter that confirmed that the property of Nucet Monastery extends from Săltava pond to the Tâmburești (now Borcea) village. Later, another charter from the time of Prince Vlad VI of Wallachia, dated 6 July 1530, confirmed the possession of "the long creek of Tâmburești". On 18 November 1614, the entire Tâmburești village and the nearby land became the property of Plumbuita Monastery, following a decree of Prince Radu Mihnea of Wallachia. From 1614 to 1863 Tâmburești was administered by the abbot of Plumbuita Monastery. The peasants lost ownership of their lands.

=== Late modern and contemporary ===
In 1863 as a result of the secularization of monastic estates in Romania and the Agrarian Law imposed by Alexandru Ioan Cuza, the monastery lost ownership of Tâmburești and the peasants regained possession of their lands. This reform also led to Tâmburești being completely separated in two neighboring villages: Pietroiu and Cocargeaua.

During the early years of the communist regime in Romania (1949–1962), Borcea (Pietroiu and Cocargeaua) went through a process of collectivization of agriculture. Personal property (lands, agricultural machinery, etc.) was confiscated by the communist state and two I.A.S. (State Agricultural Institution) were formed: I.A.S. Pietroiu and I.A.S. Borcea. These state administered institutions were basically collective farming units. In the assessment of historian Stan Stoica, collectivization seriously harmed the Romanian village: he cites the loss of "independence, dignity and identity" by the peasants; a decline in the rural population that accelerated when young people migrated to the cities (forced industrialization was going on at the same time); and the fact that families were "wrecked" by poverty, while interest in work plummeted. Another administrative reform came on 17 February 1968; this reform merged Pietroiu and Cocargeaua back together into a single commune that was called Borcea after the "Borcea branch" of the Danube. From 1968 to 1981, Borcea commune was part of Ialomița County. As a result of the State Council Decree no. 15 of 23 January 1981 Borcea was included in the newly formed Călărași County.

== Geography ==
=== Topography ===
Borcea is located in the south-eastern part of Romania, on the west side of the Borcea branch of the Danube, approximately 35 km (22 mi) north of the Bulgarian border and 75 km (47 mi) west of the Black Sea. Its geographical coordinates are 44° 20' north latitude and 27° 45' east longitude. Because Borcea is situated on the east side of the vast Wallachian Plain, more precisely, in the subdivision Bărăgan of the Ialomița Plain, it has a flat topography with a minimum elevation of 9 m (30 ft) in the flood plain of the Borcea branch and maximum elevation of 47 m (154 ft) in the northwestern part of the commune. The arable land administered by the commune extends on either side of the Borcea branch with most of the farmland on the west side. Occupying an habitable area of 5.35 km^{2} (2.07 sq mi), the nearest city, Fetești, is situated just 5 km (3.1 mi) to the north. The Wallachian Plain was formed at the end of the Cenozoic−Quaternary period by intense sedimentation of the Sarmatian Sea and the gradually withdrawal of the water from north to south and from west to east. This process formed loess as deep as 40 m (130 ft) below the Borcea commune. As a result, the soil in the surrounding region is very fertile because of the high humus content. This soil is called chernozem.

=== Climate ===
According to Köppen climate classification system Borcea has a humid continental climate typified by large seasonal temperature differences, with warm to hot summers and cold (sometimes severely cold) winters. The average annual temperature is 11.2 °C, in July the average temperature fluctuates around 23 °C, and in January there is an average of −3 °C. The lowest temperature recorded in the area dates from 8 January 1938 when there was −30 °C, and the highest of 41.4 °C on 10 August 10, 1951. The Borcea commune enjoys a high calorie potential, whose value reached 125 kcal/cm2.

Borcea sits at the influence of the crivăț wind, a cold continental wind which blows in the winter from north east creating blizzard conditions, a hot and humid wind called "Băltărețul" from the south, and the Westerlies.

The continental climate is emphasized by the annual amounts of precipitation falling on the commune and its surroundings. Thus, average annual precipitation is only 500 mm, due to the influence exercised by ascending currents that arose on nearby lake surfaces and the Borcea branch. Annual maximum is recorded in May–June and a minimum in July–August, during which the sky is mostly clear and brief periods of drought may occur.

Climate data for Borcea
Month	Jan	Feb	Mar	Apr	May	Jun	Jul	Aug	Sep	Oct	Nov	Dec	Year
Record high °C (°F)	16 (61)	20 (68)	27 (81)	30 (86)	34 (93)	37 (99)	39 (102)	38 (100)	35 (95)	33 (91)	25 (77)	18 (64)	39 (102)
Mean daily maximum °C (°F)	2 (36)	3 (37)	10 (50)	16 (61)	22 (72)	26 (79)	27 (81)	27 (81)	24 (75)	17 (63)	8 (46)	4 (39)	16 (61)
Daily mean °C (°F)	—	1 (34)	6 (43)	11 (52)	17 (63)	20 (68)	22 (72)	21 (70)	18 (64)	12 (54)	5 (41)	1 (34)	11 (52)
Mean daily minimum °C (°F)	−3 (27)	−2 (28)	1 (34)	6 (43)	11 (52)	15 (59)	16 (61)	15 (59)	12 (54)	6 (43)	1 (34)	−1 (30)	6.5 (43.7)
Record low °C (°F)	−24 (−11)	−18 (0)	−16 (3)	−2 (28)	—	7 (45)	11 (52)	8 (46)	−1 (30)	−6 (21)	−12 (10)	−17 (1)	−24 (−11)
Average precipitation days	10	10	8	8	8	8	5	5	5	6	9	9	91
Average rainy days	4	5	6	8	8	8	5	5	5	6	7	6	73
Average snowy days	7	6	3	—	—	—	—	—	—	—	2	4	22
Average relative humidity (%)	80	74	63	55	53	52	51	48	48	58	76	84	62
Source: weatherbase.com

== Law and government ==
=== Administration ===
The commune is governed by a mayor–council system. In Borcea, the central government is responsible for public education, libraries, public safety, recreational facilities, sanitation, water supply and welfare services. The mayor and councillors are elected to four-year terms. Decisions are approved and discussed by the local council (consiliu local) made up of 14 elected Councillors.

In Romania the two round system is used to elect the Mayors. The number of votes needed to win in the first round is calculated using the local electoral list. To elect the Local Councils, the closed party list proportional representation is used, with a 5% threshold of the votes at the constituency level.

From 2004, the mayor office was held by Marcel Zăgărin who was re-elected in 2008. The last local elections took place in 2008 on June 1 (first round) and June 15 (second round). In the first round Marcel Zăgărin (PC) was leading with 46.43% of the votes closely followed by Zaharia Costică (PNL) with 38.30%. In the third place was Cristian Burlacu Ion (PSD) with 5.62% and in the fourth Crinel Din (PD-L) with 5.52%. On 15 June 2008, the current mayor won the elections round with 53.62% of the votes to 46.37% for his closest opponent and former mayor of Borcea, Zaharia Costică.

=== Central government ===
Borcea is part of Călărași County's 2nd electoral district of the Chamber of Deputies, which is currently represented by Ioan Damian (PSD). Although Jenel Serban (PNL) won the 2008 elections in the district with 36.21% of the votes to 30.32% for Ioan Damian he lost the deputy mandate to Eugen Nicolaescu, a party colleague, after the county redistribution of votes.

In the Senate, Borcea is represented by Vasile Nedelcu (PNL), winner at the 2008 elections for Călărași County's 1st Senate electoral district

== Architecture and landmarks ==
=== Vernacular architecture in Borcea ===
Many of the houses in Borcea are built using traditional means of construction and locally sourced materials. The masonry construction of the houses use sun-dried mudbricks called chirpici. Finer adobe is also used for exterior coating and as a binding material. The exterior of a house is usually covered with a layer of lime. Some houses are decorated with traditional motifs. The simple ridged roof consists of declined rafters that rest on vertical wall-plates on top of each wall. Tiles are often used as a roof covering although galvanised steel and bitumen could also be found. The roof often extends toward the front of a house to cover a small porch. Supporting frames are seldom used in this type of construction and are usually made of wood. Building an mudbrick house is a community effort with relatives of the house owner assisting in the erection of the building.

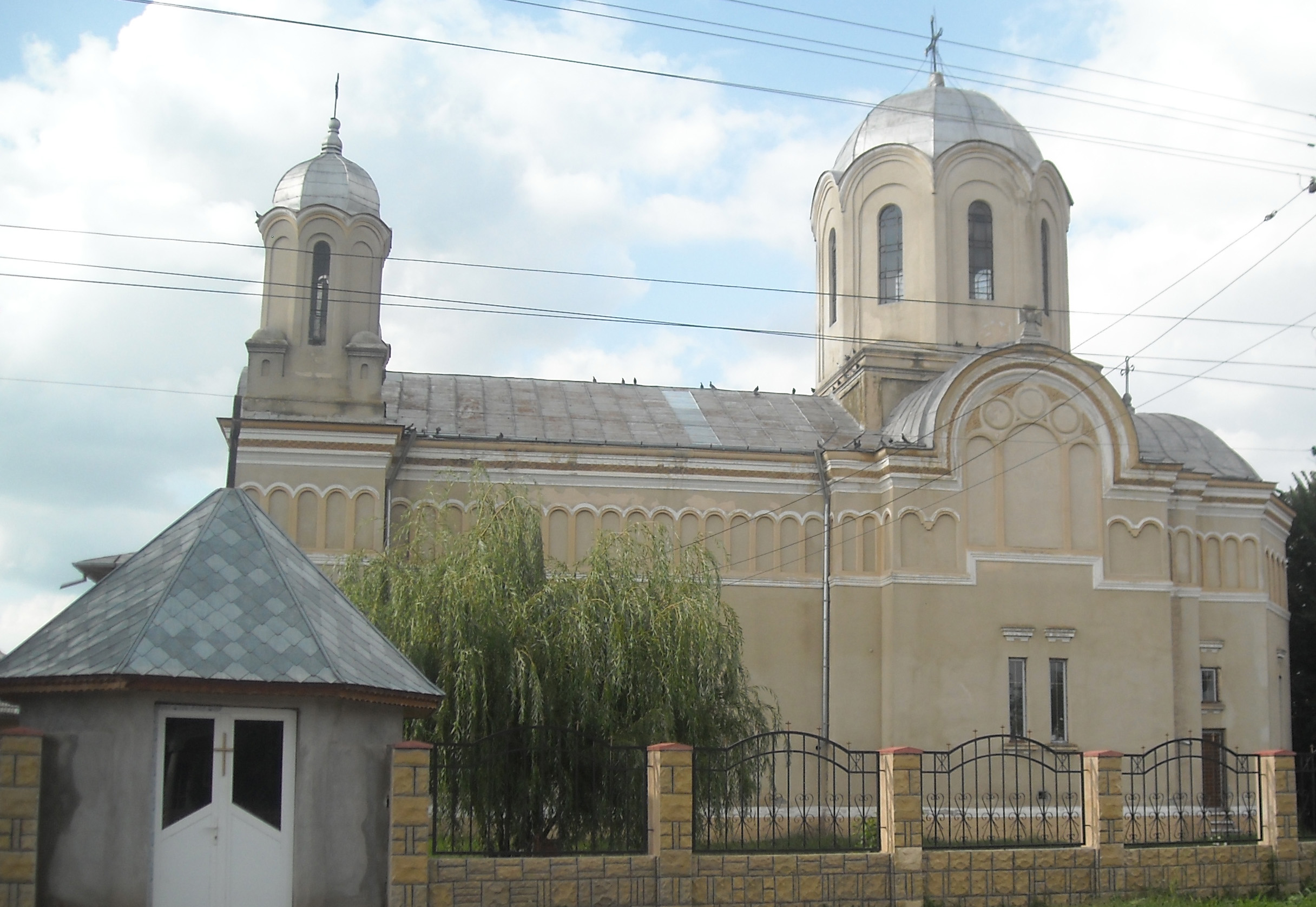
Saint Nicholas Church

=== Saint Nicholas Church ===
Saint Nicholas Church was built between 1909 and 1911 in distinct neo-Byzantine architecture. It has a typical cross-shaped design with two hemispherical domes, arcades blending into the domes with tin roofing that flows smoothly around the arches and a relatively small belltower. The interior is decorated with mural paintings and a large iconostasis that separates the nave from the sanctuary. There are no seats or pews as in the West, but high-armed chairs placed along the walls traditionally called "strana pl.strane".

The church was founded by nobleman Miniu Ion and the first parish priest was Radu Nicolescu. It underwent a foundation reinforcement in 1931, and nave vault repairs in 1941.

== Demographics ==
Historical population
Year	Pop.	±%
2002	9,694	—
2011	7,986	−17.6%
2021	7,219	−9.6%
Source: Census data

According to the National Institute of Statistics, the commune's population in July 2011 was 9,982 inhabitants. in an area of 5.35 km2 (2.07 sq mi). The population density is 20.1 people/km2.

In the commune the population was spread out, with 19.82% under the age of 14, 58.34% from 14 to 59 and 21.85% who were 60 years of age or older. The males represented 50.11% of the population while the females 49.89%.

According to the 2002 Romanian census, 99.15% (9,612 people) of the population of Borcea are ethnic Romanians. The remainder is composed of Roma 0.78% (76 people), Hungarians 0.03% (3 people) and Lipovans 0.03% (3 people).

In terms of religion, 99.13% (9610 people) of the population are Romanian Orthodox and 0.69% (67 people) are Seventh-day Adventist. The Roman Catholic and the Reformed communities claim 0.14% (14 people) and 0.03% (3 people) of the population respectively.

Romanian is spoken as a first language by 99.82% of the population of Borcea. Vlax Romani is spoken by 0.12% (12 people), Hungarian by 0.03% (3 people) and Russian by 0.02% (2 people) of the population.

The population of Borcea is experiencing a decline since the fall of the communist regime due to the proximity to the cities Călărași (34 km) and Fetești (5 km) and the 2007 integration of Romania into the European Union. This led to the widespread migration of the population to the nearby cities or higher income countries where there are better job opportunities and higher salaries.

== Economy ==
The economy of the Borcea commune revolves around agriculture, fishing and retailing. As of 2011 over 200 companies were registered in Borcea, 32 agricultural companies, of which three are former state farms operating more than 8,000 ha (20,000 acres) of arable land.

The commune's budget for 2011 was 7,413,000 RON (approx 1,705,000 EUR).

Tourism in Borcea is based on the fishing and hunting activities.

Top ten companies after annual turnover (2010):

Company	Annual Turnover (RON)	Annual Turnover(EUR)	Domain
Agricom Borcea SA	15,847,297	3,642,625	Agriculture
Agroserv Borcea SRL	3,343,225	768,466	Agriculture
Crismetal SRL	2,085,411	479,348	Agriculture
Filip Construct SRL	1,701,992	391,216	Construction
SC Top Construct SRL	1,526,685	350,920	Retail
SC Agrofulvia SRL	1,415,287	325,314	Agriculture
SC Agromec Borcea SA	1,173,675	269,778	Agriculture
SC Bac COM SRL	985,777	226,588	Retail
SC Agro Vis 2006 SRL	800,315	183,958	Agriculture
SC Consumcoorp Borcea	640,659	147,260	Retail

== Transport ==
Borcea is served by two roads: the national road DN3B (which runs through Călărași and Fetești) and the county road DJ308A (which links Borcea to the national road DN3A). Borcea still relies on gravel roads for inner commune transportation. The nearest train station is in Fetești, 12 km (7.5 mi) away.

== Notable people ==
- Vasile Adamescu (1944–2018), deafblind educator
- Gerhard Ortinau (born 1953), writer
