= Vasile Adamescu =

Deafblind Romanian educator

- Born: 5 September 1944; Borcea
- Died: 6 December 2018 (aged 74); Cluj-Napoca
- Occupation: Teacher

Vasile Adamescu (5 September 1944 – 6 December 2018) was a Romanian educator. Deafblind from age two, Adamescu taught children with sensory deficiencies. He was awarded the Romanian National Order of Merit in 2013.

== Early life and education ==
Vasile Adamescu was born in Borcea, a commune in Călărași County, southeast Romania, on 5 September 1944. Vasile was the second child born to his parents, Zamfir and Voica; his mother died when he was an infant. At age two he lost his sight and hearing after contracting meningitis. He received no schooling until age eleven, when his father brought him to the School for the Visually Impaired in Cluj. Some teachers at the school were reluctant to accept Adamescu, as they thought he would be better placed at a school for the deaf. The principal of the school taught him the manual alphabet, and Florica Sandu, a special education teacher, taught him to speak, read, and write. Adamescu wrote about his education:

One day, while I was studying in the school museum, it occurred to my teacher to teach me the letter f. Every time I tried to associate a word with the letter I was learning. Initially she showed me the position of the teeth and tongue, necessary for the pronunciation of this letter, after which she lit a match and handed it to me to make me understand that f is the first letter of the word fire. I got scared and dropped the match over the old carpets in the museum. I then bent down, trying to find it. I knew the idea of fire, but I didn't know what word it was associated with. A story came to my mind from Borcea, my native village, when, by mistake, without knowing what I was doing, I set fire to the stable. This was when I began to understand that every object has a name. From now on I was curious to know the name of each object around me.

Adamescu graduated middle school in 1967 and from the Special High School for the Blind in Cluj in 1973. That summer, he began studies at the Department of Defectology in the Faculty of History-Philosophy at Babeș-Bolyai University. He was one of the first to graduate from the newly renamed Department of Psychopedagogy in 1977, graduating with an average of 9.75 out of 10.

== Artwork ==
Adamescu was also an artist who worked with modeling in clay. Between 1983 and 1986 he attended the folk school of fine arts in Cluj-Napoca, focusing on sculpture. He created many forms in clay work, including busts, animals, and buildings. An exhibition of Adamescu's work sponsored by the ASTRA Museum in Sibiu was held in 2014, featuring over 80 of his fired and unfired clay figures.

== Career and later life ==
Adamescu was a teacher at the high school he attended, the Special High School for the Blind in Cluj-Napoca, from 1977 to 2004. He prioritized the education of children with sensory deficiencies.

After his retirement in 2004, he continued to advocate for those with sensory deficiencies. Adamescu participated in international conferences, giving televised interviews, and consulting with educators and students. In 2015 he became a member of the board of directors of Sense International Romania, a nonprofit organization dedicated to those with deafblindness. He also ran free pottery workshops with the visually impaired and deaf and hard of hearing.

He published his autobiography, Înfruntând viața (Facing Life), in three volumes, published in 2013, 2018, and 2020. The work took about ten years to write; the text was written in Braille and transcribed on a computer. It was the first book in Romania written by a deafblind person.

Adamescu died in Cluj-Napoca on 6 December 2018.

== Honors ==
He was named the Honorary Citizen of Cluj-Napoca in 2010. Sense International Romania named Adamescu a Promoter of the Rights of People with Deafblindness in 2018.

In 2013, Romanian President Traian Băsescu awarded Adamescu the National Order of Merit at the level of Knight in recognition of his dedication to educating people with disabilities.
