= RoAF 86th Air Base =

Air base in Borcea, Romania

RoAF 86th Air Base
- Baza 86 Aeriană "Locotenent aviator Gheorghe Mociorniță" Borcea
- Borcea, Călărași County; Near Fetești in Romania
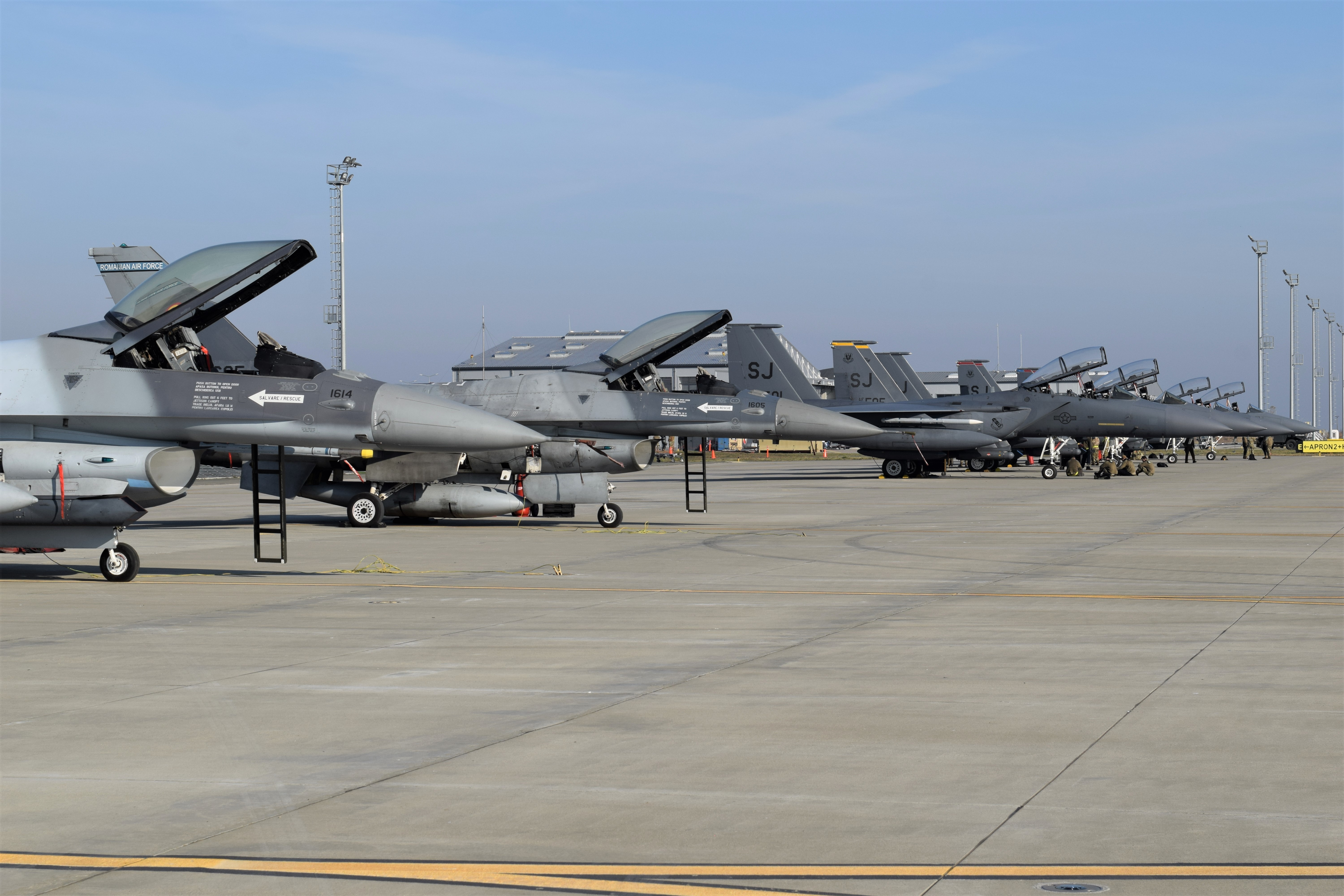
- F-15E Strike Eagles of the 336th Fighter Squadron and Romanian F-16s parked at the base in 2021

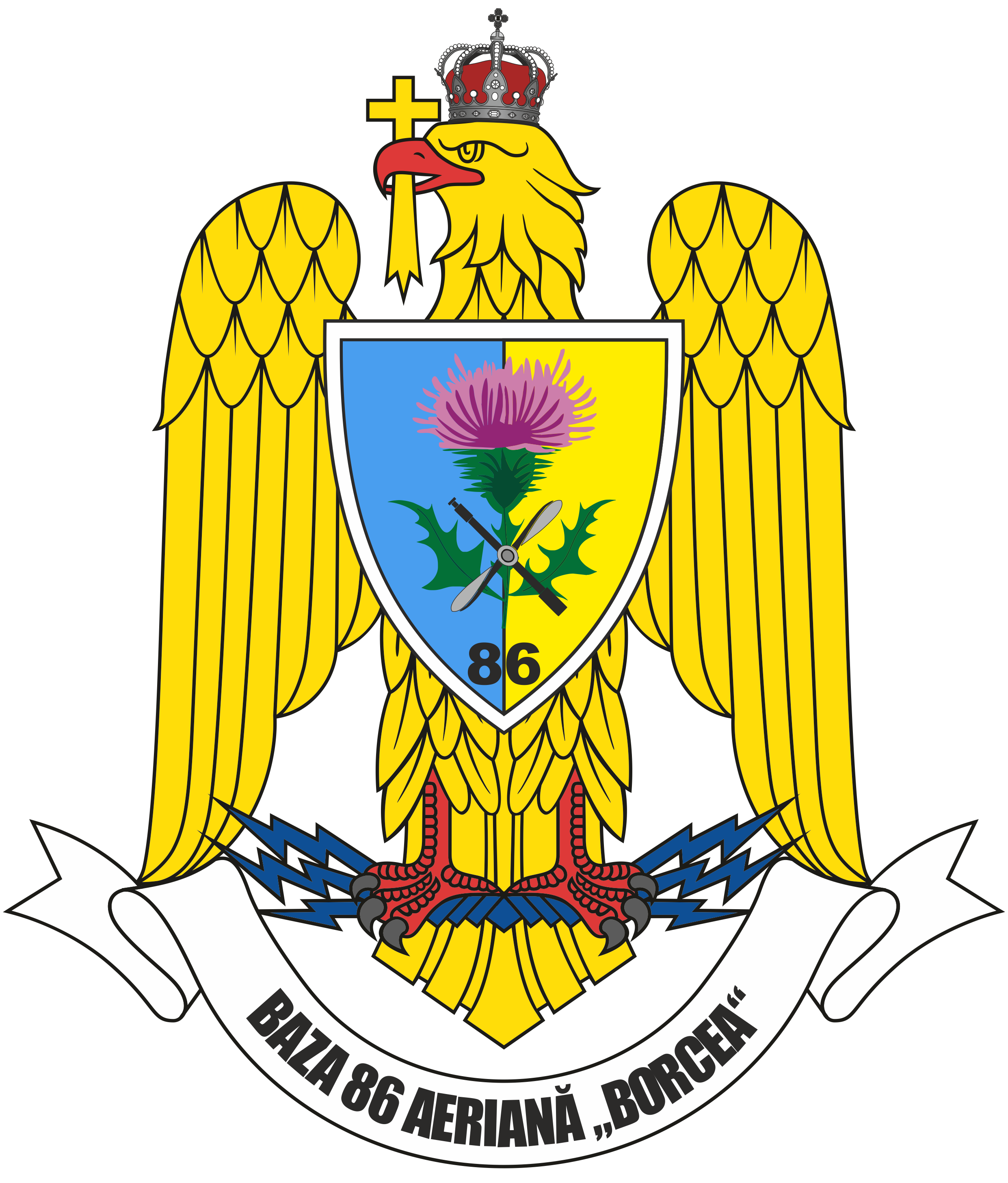
- Coat of arms of the 86th Air Base

Site information
- Owner: Ministry of National Defence
- Operator: Romanian Air Force

Location
- Location within Romania Location within Europe
- Coordinates: 44°23′44″N 027°43′32″E

Site history
- Built: 1939
- In use: 1939–Present

Garrison information
- Current commander: General de flotilă aeriană Iulian Pațilea
- Occupants: 53rd Fighter Squadron "Warhawks"; EFTC "Impalers"

Airfield information
- Identifiers: ICAO: LRFT
- Elevation: 55 metres (180 ft) AMSL
Runways
Direction	Length and surface
18/36	2,800 metres (9,186 ft) Asphalt

The Romanian Air Force 86th Air Base "Lieutenant Aviator Gheorghe Mociorniță" (Romanian: Baza 86 Aeriană "Locotenent aviator Gheorghe Mociorniță"), also known as Fetești or Borcea Air Base, is located in commune Borcea, Călărași County near the town of Fetești. It is currently the home of the 53rd Fighter Squadron (operating F-16 Fighting Falcons) and the location of the European F-16 Training Center.

The current commander of the base is General de flotilă aeriană Iulian Pațilea.

== History ==
On the current grounds of the airbase, a military aerodrome was established in 1939 following an order of the General Staff. Known as the Cocargeaua aerodrome, it was to be used as a reserve landing and deployment base of the Royal Romanian Air Force during World War II. In 1940, wooden barracks, and fuel storage facilities were built on the airfield. Over the years, the name of the base varied between Cocargeaua, Bărăganu, Borcea, and Fetești. In February 1944, the 51st Fighter Squadron of the 5th Fighter Group was moved to the Cocargeaua aerodrome and began flying interception missions against USAAF bombers with Bf 109E and IAR 80 fighters starting in April. After 23 August 1944, the 52nd Fighter Squadron also joined the 51st at Cocargeaua where the 5th Group remained until the end of the war.

During the Soviet occupation of Romania, the aerodrome was used as a base by the Soviet Air Forces until 1958. On 9 August 1958, the 206th Tactical Fighter Aviation Regiment, equipped with MiG-17PF fighters, together with the 499th Technical Base were moved to Cocargeaua and received a squadron of MiG-19 aircraft. The unit was first formed in the spring of 1952 on the Deveselu airfield, then moved several times to Ianca, then to Otopeni. From 1959, the 206th Tactical Fighter Aviation Regiment was subordinated to the 15th Tactical Fighter Aviation Division and received a new name - the 86th Fighter Aviation Regiment.

In 1967, an important change took place in the 86th Fighter Aviation Regiment, with the introduction of the new MiG-21F-13 fighter jet. Thus, the 86th Fighter Aviation Regiment was fully equipped with supersonic aircraft: two squadrons with MiG-21F-13 and one squadron with MiG-19.

=== After 1989 ===
In 1995, the 86th Fighter Aviation Regiment turned into the 86th Fighter Aviation Group and the 86th Fighter and Fighter Bomber Air Base. At the same time, the 86th Fighter Aviation Group was given the honorary name "Lieutenant Aviator Gheorghe Mociorniță".

Starting in 1997, a squadron at the 86th Air base began intensive training, in order to become capable of carrying out joint missions with NATO forces. A special training program was initiated, aiming at a higher level of interoperability, and for this purpose the Fighter-Bomber Squadron was fully equipped with MiG-21 LanceRs. By the end of 2000, as a result of the Romanian Air Force reform, the structure of the 86th Air Base changed again. The 86th Air base has now a modular structure, fitting NATO's airbase model and offering a real background for achieving appropriate interoperability at this level, with the declared purpose to provide the necessary basis to plan, organize, command, and accomplish the missions assigned.

Between 2013 and 2015, the base was modernized to NATO standards. Facilities were also built to accommodate the F-16 fighters. Since 2016, it is the home base of the 53rd Fighter Squadron, the first Romanian Air Force squadron equipped with F-16s.

The MiG-21 LanceR was officially retired on 15 May 2023. Ceremonies were held at the 71st Air Base and at the 86th Air Base. The MiGs were then flown to the 95th Air Base in Bacău for storage.

== Foreign deployments ==
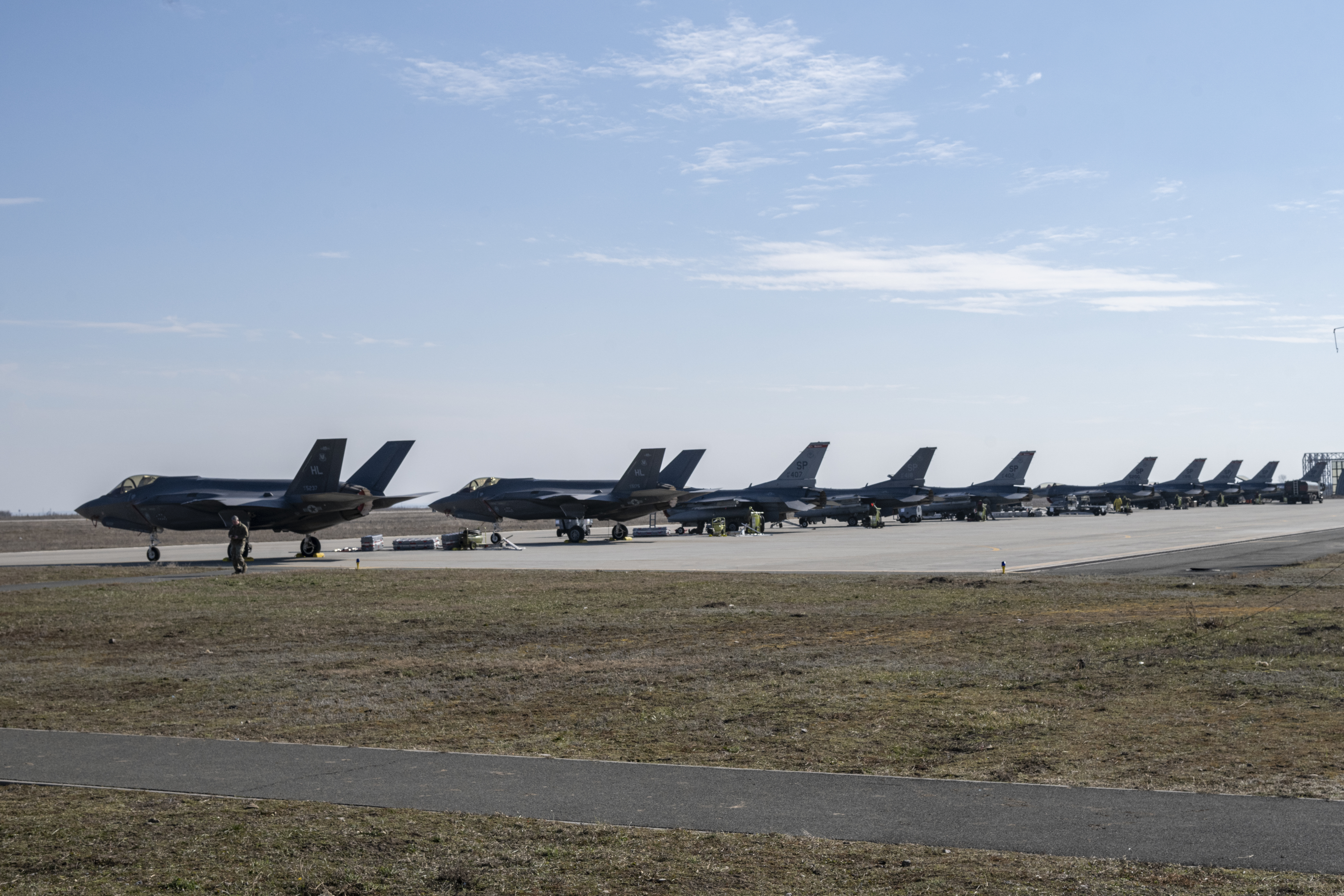
F-35s of the 388th Fighter Wing and F-16s of the 480th Fighter Squadron at the base in 2022

The first US deployment at the base took place in 2021 when the 336th Fighter Squadron arrived to conduct exercise Castle Forge. In February 2022, eight F-16s of the 480th Fighter Squadron were deployed to the base to conduct enhanced Air Policing missions. The F-16s participated in enhanced Air Policing activities for a three-month period, until they were replaced by the 510th Fighter Squadron.

Hours after the Russian invasion of Ukraine on 24 February, two F-35 Lightning II aircraft of the United States Air Forces in Europe landed at the 86th Air Base, in support of the NATO mission.

Other fighter detachments deployed at the base on three-month rotations in support of the enhanced Air Policing mission included Dassault Rafales of the French Air and Space Force starting from October 2023, and F-16s of the Turkish Air Force starting from December 2023. The Royal Air Force began deploying Eurofighter Typhoons at the airbase as part of Operation Biloxi in 2026.

== European F-16 Training Center ==
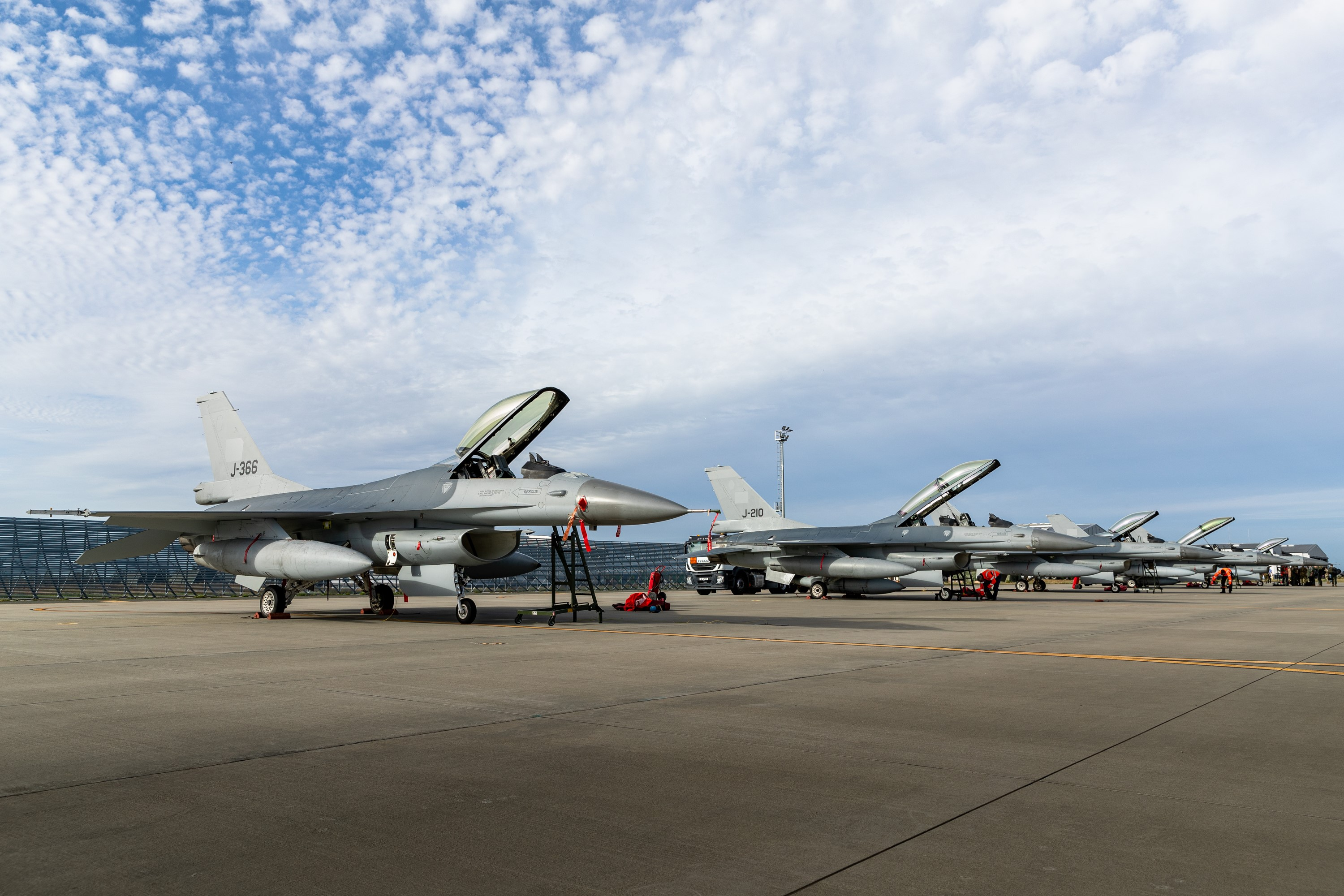
Aircraft of the EFTC at the base

In July 2023, it was announced that the F-16 training center intended for Romanian, Ukrainian, and other NATO pilots was to be located at the 86th Air Base. The hub is supported by an international coalition which was formed during the 2023 Vilnius summit. Lockheed Martin also participates in the project with several subcontractors. It is organized by Romania, the Netherlands, and Lockheed Martin. Romania provides the base infrastructure, the Netherlands provides the 18 F-16 aircraft for training, while the instructors, technicians, and logistics support are provided by Draken International, Gesellschaft für Flugzieldarstellung (GFD), ILIAS Solutions, and Daedalus Aviation Group. The training center first used the aircraft for refresher training of the hired F-16 instructors. This was followed by training of NATO and Ukrainian pilots. Training courses only take place in NATO airspace.

On 29 August, a Letter of Intent for the establishment of the F-16 Training Center was signed by the Romanian and Dutch Ministries of Defence, and Lockheed Martin during the Informal Meeting of EU Defence Ministers in Toledo, Spain. The first five aircraft arrived at the base on 7 November, with the new European F-16 Training Center (EFTC) being inaugurated after an official ceremony on 13 November 2023. The EFTC is commanded by a Romanian Air Force officer. The instructors are provided by Draken International from the United States, while Airbus Defence and Space subsidiary GFD provides instructors from Europe.

The center provides five training modules:

- Basic F-16 training for either new students, experienced fighter pilots on other aircraft, or for pilots already qualified on the F-16;
- Flight lead training;
- F-16 instructor training;
- Night vision devices training;
- Targeting pod training.

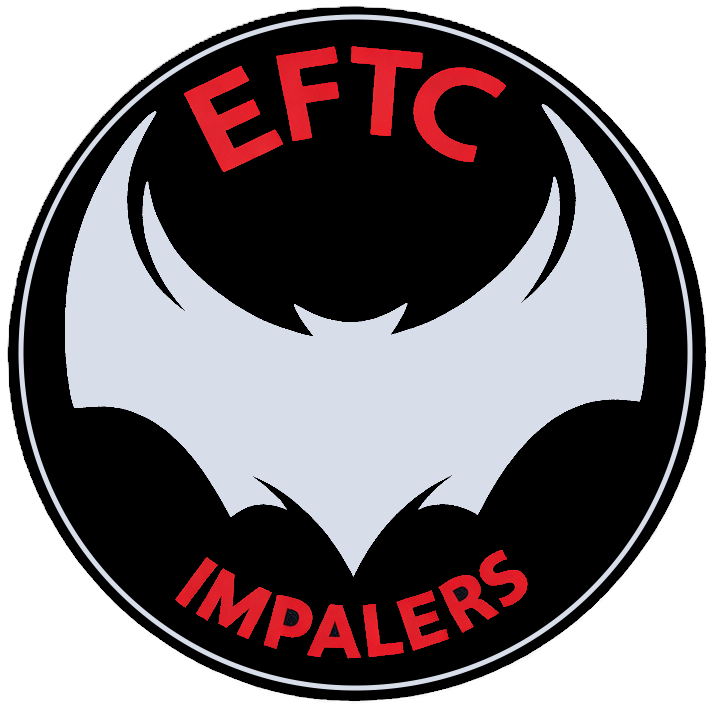
Badge of the EFTC Squadron

According to General Onno Eichelsheim, the Dutch Chief of Defence, Ukrainian pilots were to begin training in early 2024. The first group of students that started training at the center in November 2023 was made up of seven Romanian former MiG-21 LanceR pilots. They finished training in July 2024. Their training was not too difficult, since these pilots already spoke English and were familiar with NATO operating standards. In June 2024, the Romanian Government approved an emergency ordinance through which it was to cover the training and accommodation expenses of the Ukrainian pilots at the base. Also in June, it was announced that the first ten Ukrainian pilots who completed training in France were to arrive in Romania to complete their training on the F-16. The first Ukrainian pilots arrived at the base for training in September 2024. This was announced by the Ukrainian Defense Minister Rustem Umerov.

The 18 F-16s at the Center were officially transferred to the Romanian Air Force for the price of 1 euro on 3 November 2025. The aircraft continue to be operated for training NATO and Ukrainian pilots while retaining Romanian Air Force markings and registration. The EFTC squadron operates under the nickname of "Impalers", which is meant as a nod to nearby Transylvania, Vlad the Impaler and Vampire bats.

== Based units ==
The following flying and non-flying units are located at Borcea.

Air Force General Staff

- 86th Air Base Command
  - 86th Air Operations Center
  - 86th Operational Group
    - 53rd Fighter Squadron
    - European F-16 Training Center Squadron
  - 86th Force Protection Group
    - 864th Anti-Aircraft Artillery Battalion
    - 866th Military Police Company
  - 86th Support Group
    - Air Communications and Air Navigation Technical Systems Company
    - Transport Company
    - Service Platoon

== Decorations ==
The 86th Air Base has received the following decorations:

- Order of Aeronautical Virtue, Peacetime (Knight – 2012; Officer – 2017; Commander – 2022)

== Gallery ==
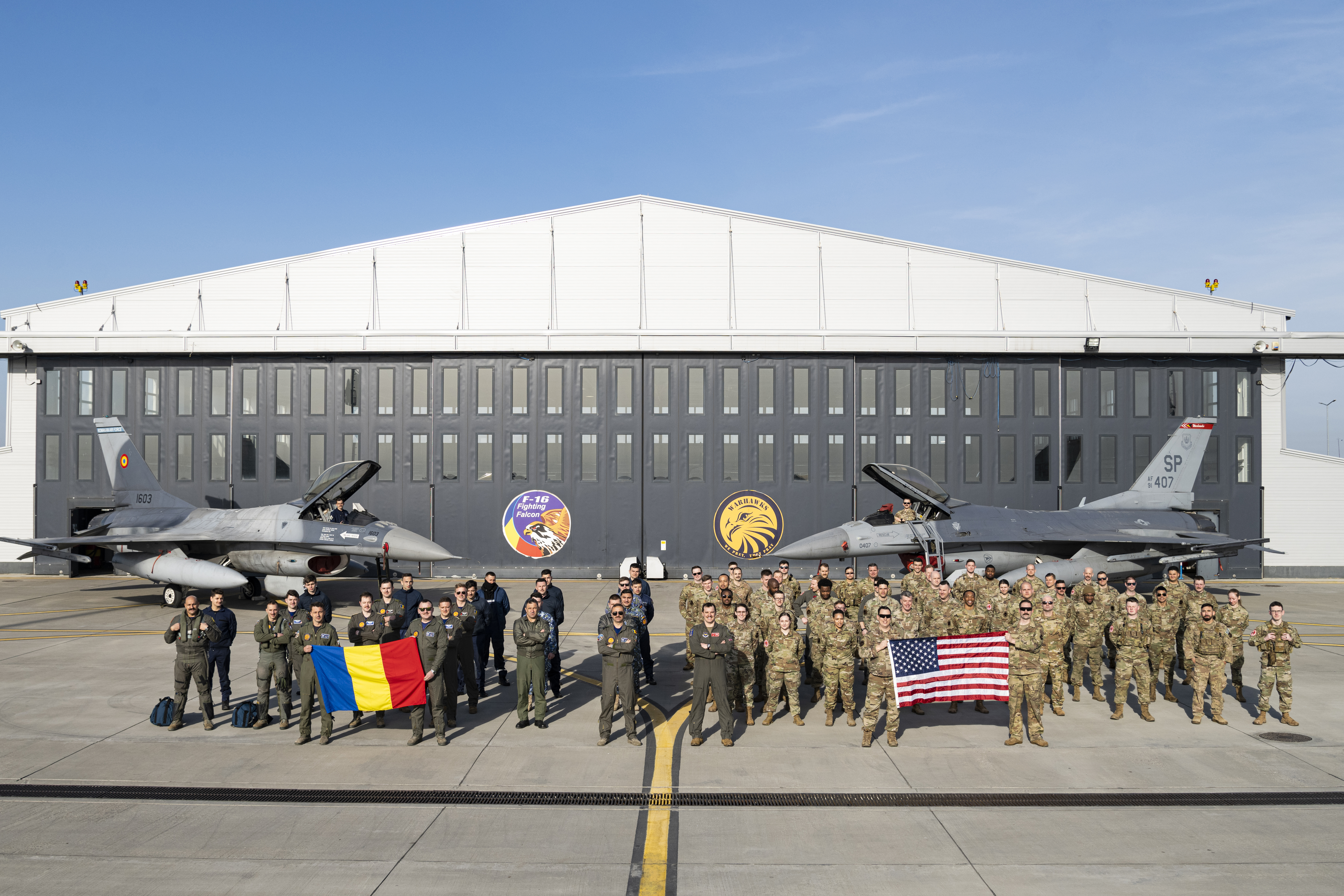
US airmen from the 480th Fighter Squadron together with Romanian airmen at the base.

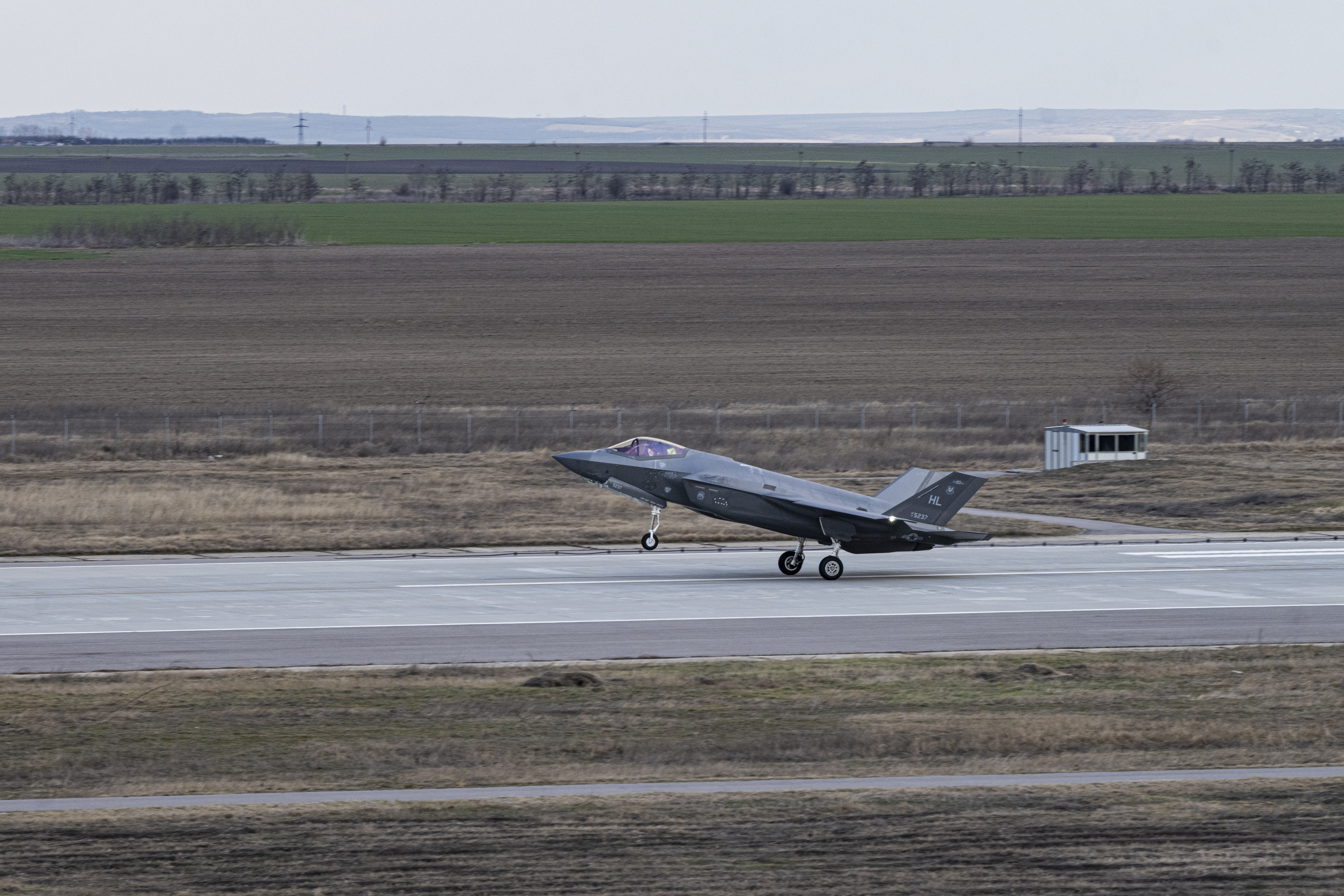
An F-35 of the 34th Fighter Squadron landing at the base in February 2022.

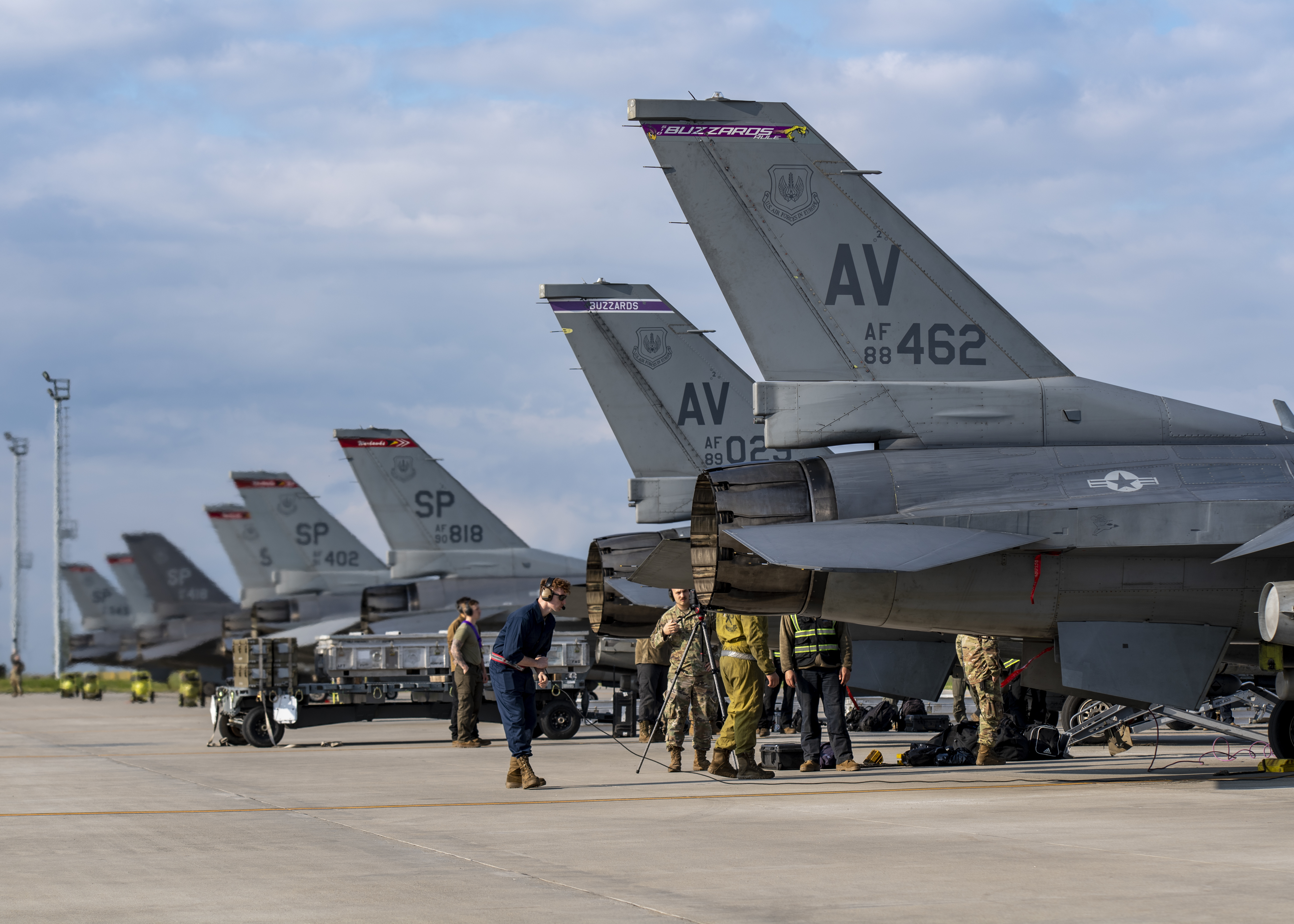
US F-16s parked at the base in 2022.

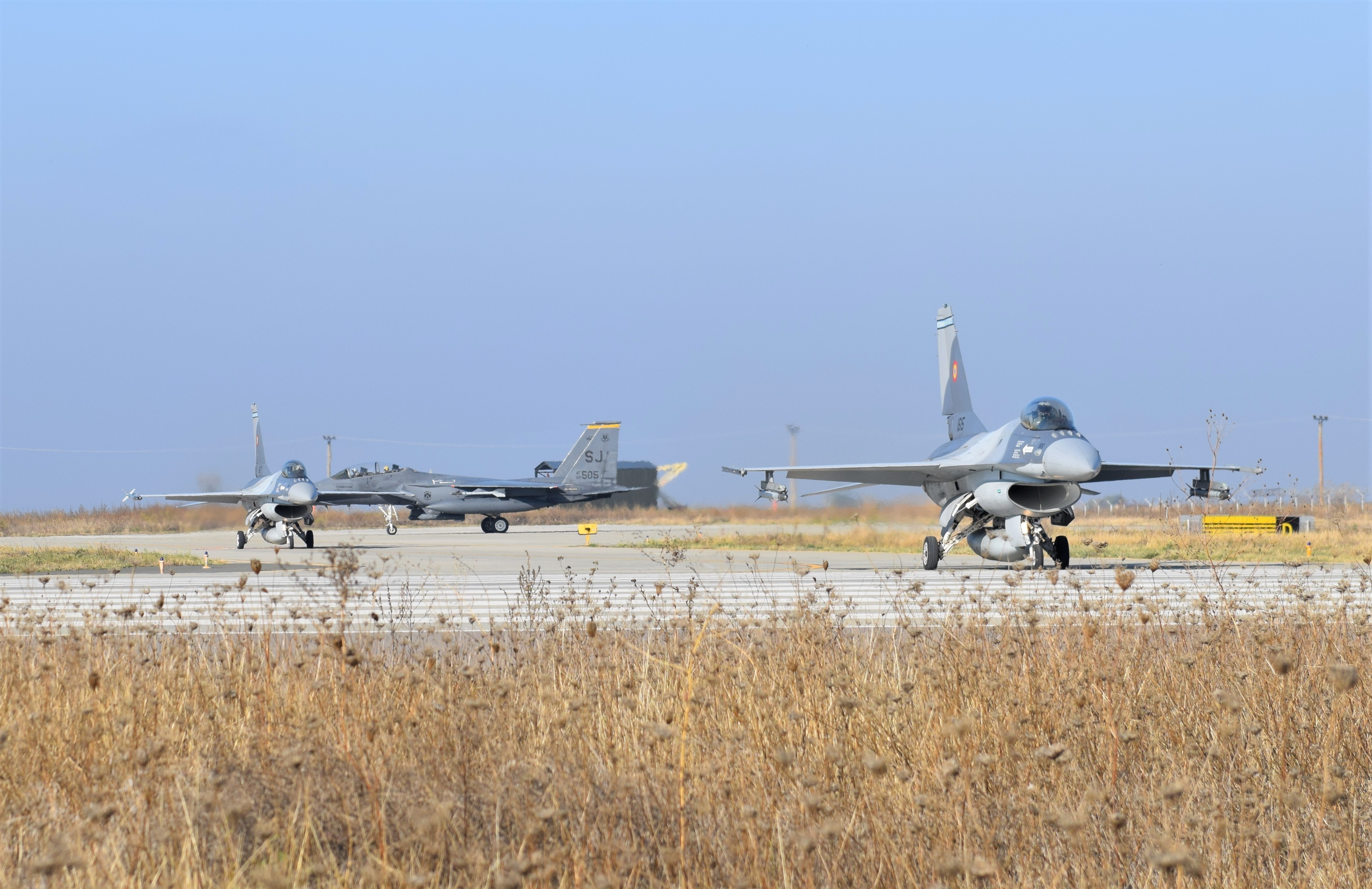
F-15Es of the 336th Fighter Squadron and Romanian F-16s during operation Castle Forge.

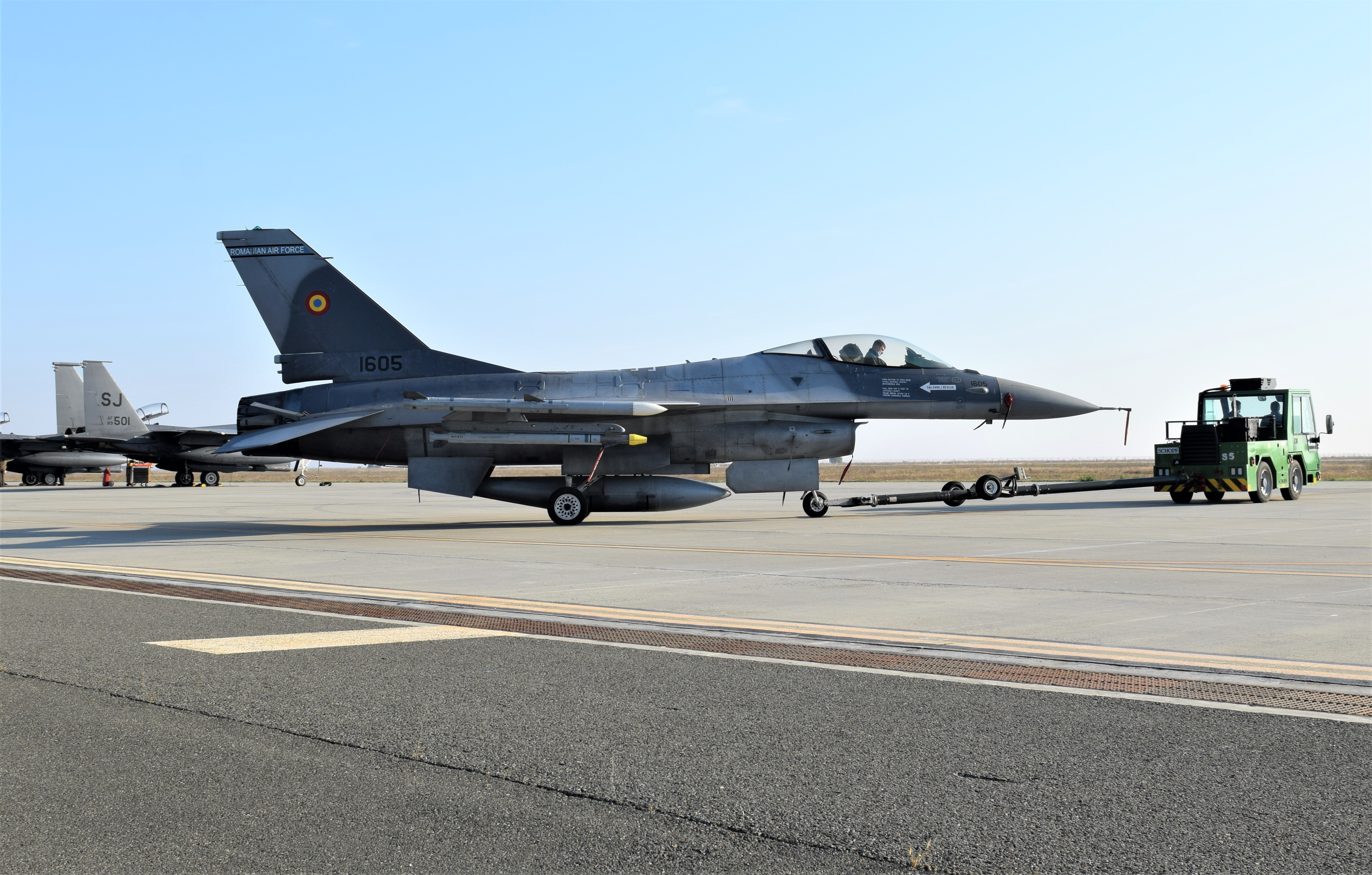
Romanian F-16 prepared for a sortie.

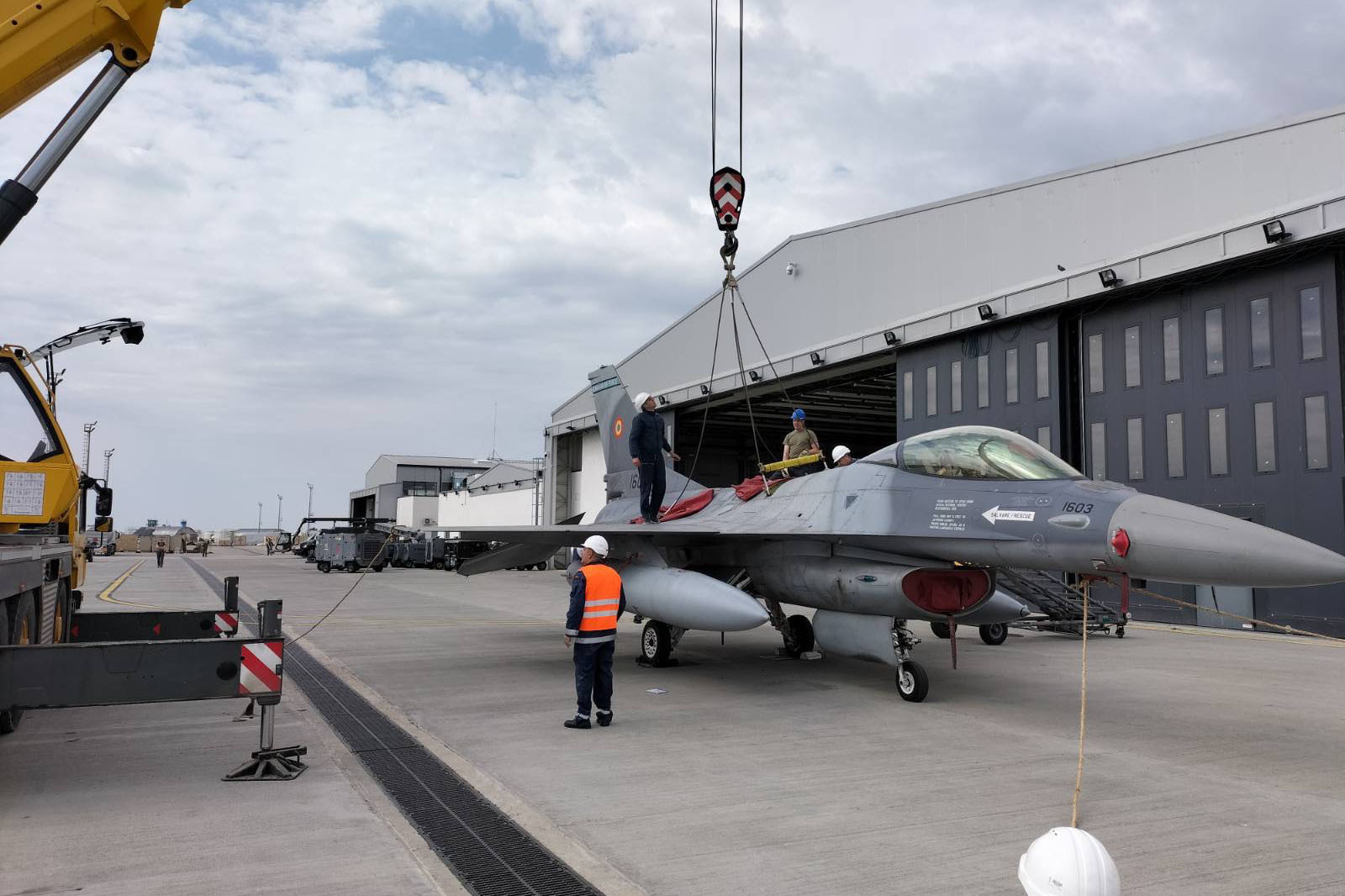
Romanian air force ground crews lifting an F-16 for maintenance.

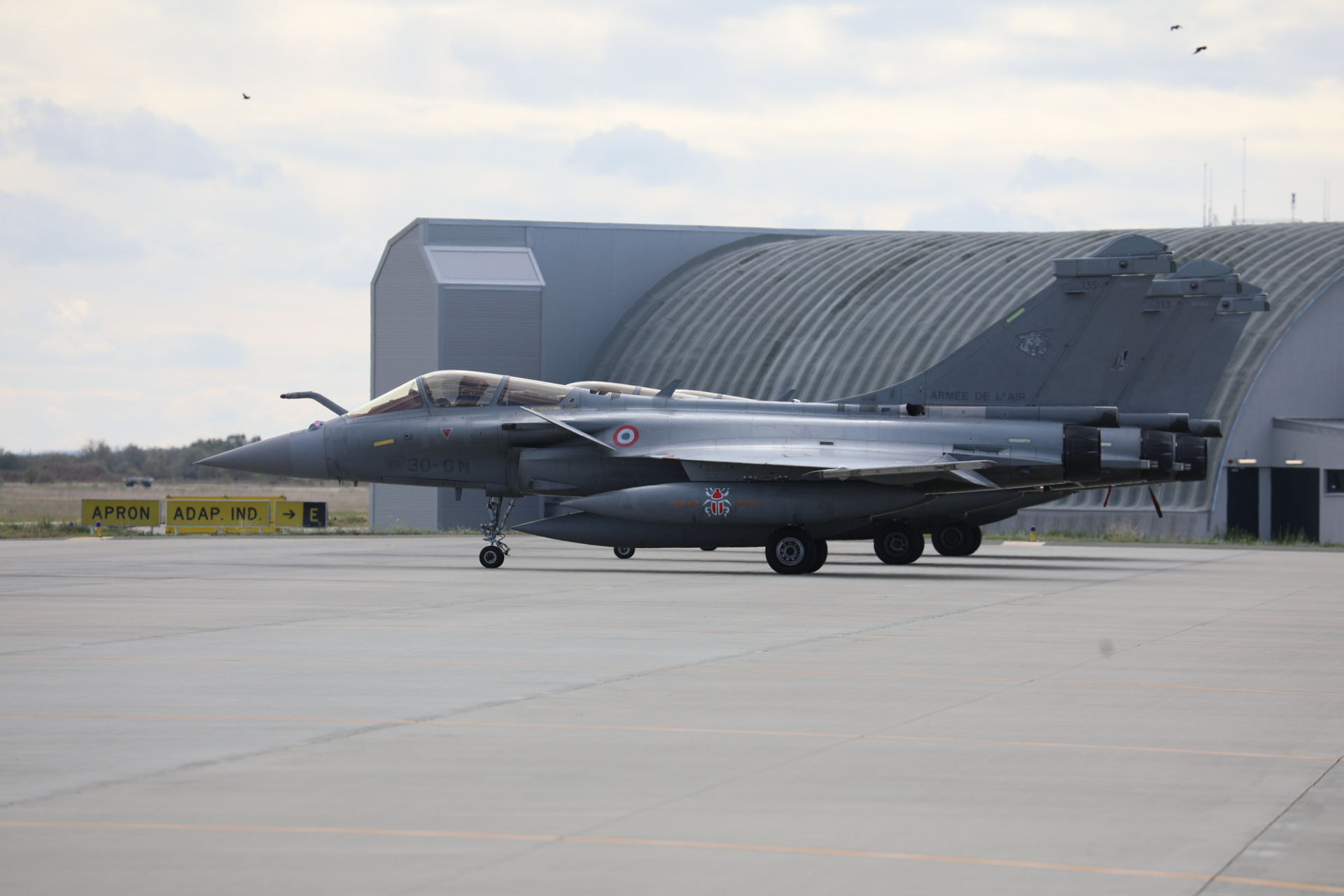
Dassault Rafale fighters of Escadron de Chasse 3/30 Lorraine at the base in October 2023.
