= National Museum of Romanian Aviation =

Museum in Bucharest, Romania

- Muzeul Național al Aviației Române
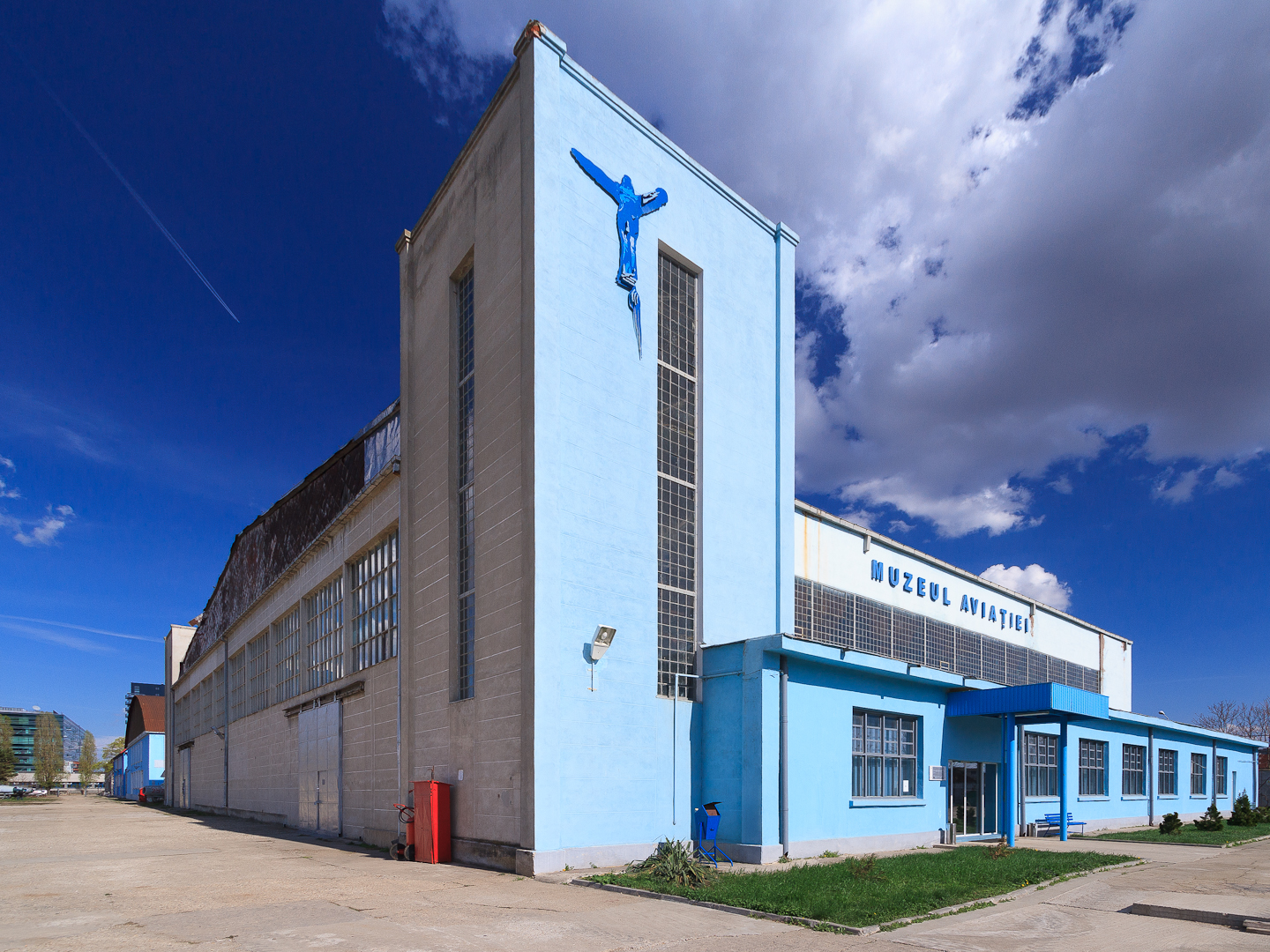
- Hangar building of the museum
- Established: 2 March 1990
- Location: Bucharest, Romania
- Coordinates: 44°28′36.98″N 26°6′38.77″E
- Type: Aviation museum
- Director: Comandor Mihai-Iulian Pena
- Owner: Romanian Air Force
- Website: https://roaf.ro/?cpt_portfolio=muzeul-national-al-aviatiei-romane

The National Museum of Romanian Aviation (Romanian: Muzeul Național al Aviației Române) is an aviation museum owned by the General Staff of the Romanian Air Force. The museum was established on 2 March 1990, being initially located on the Otopeni military base. In 2006, it was moved in the hangars of the former Pipera Airport. The museum also manages the "History and Museography of Rockets and Space Research" section of the Hermann Oberth memorial house in Mediaș.

The current director of the museum is Comandor Mihai-Iulian Pena.

== History ==
=== Origins ===
Nicolae Iorga was the first to bring up the idea of establishing a Romanian aviation museum. After the First World War, the Romanian National Aeronautic League took the first steps to establish the museum. For this task, the League collected various items captured by the Romanian Army during the war.

After 1970, the foundations of the air museum were laid in Boboc and Mediaș. However, following a protocol, these were passed to the aviation section of the National Military Museum. After 1989, the process of establishing the Aviation Museum was resumed.

=== 1990–present ===
On 2 March 1990, the Aviation Museum was established through a Government decision. The museum was opened in 1993, at that time being located in five campaign tents at the Otopeni Air Base. In 1998, the museum was moved to a more suitable space at the Băneasa Airport. On 2 March 2000, the museum received a new exhibition space near Otopeni airport.

On 18 March 2006, the museum was moved to its current location at the former airfield of Pipera. It is located in the World War II-era hangars on what used to be the south side of the airfield.

In 2023, the museum began modernization works. Under the project, which is to be finished by April 2027, the three hangars of the museum will be completely renovated with Hangar 1 to serve as the main exhibit space, Hangar 2 as an archive and documentation space, and Hangar 3 as a repair and restoration workshop. The exterior exhibit space will also be reconfigured.

== Collections ==
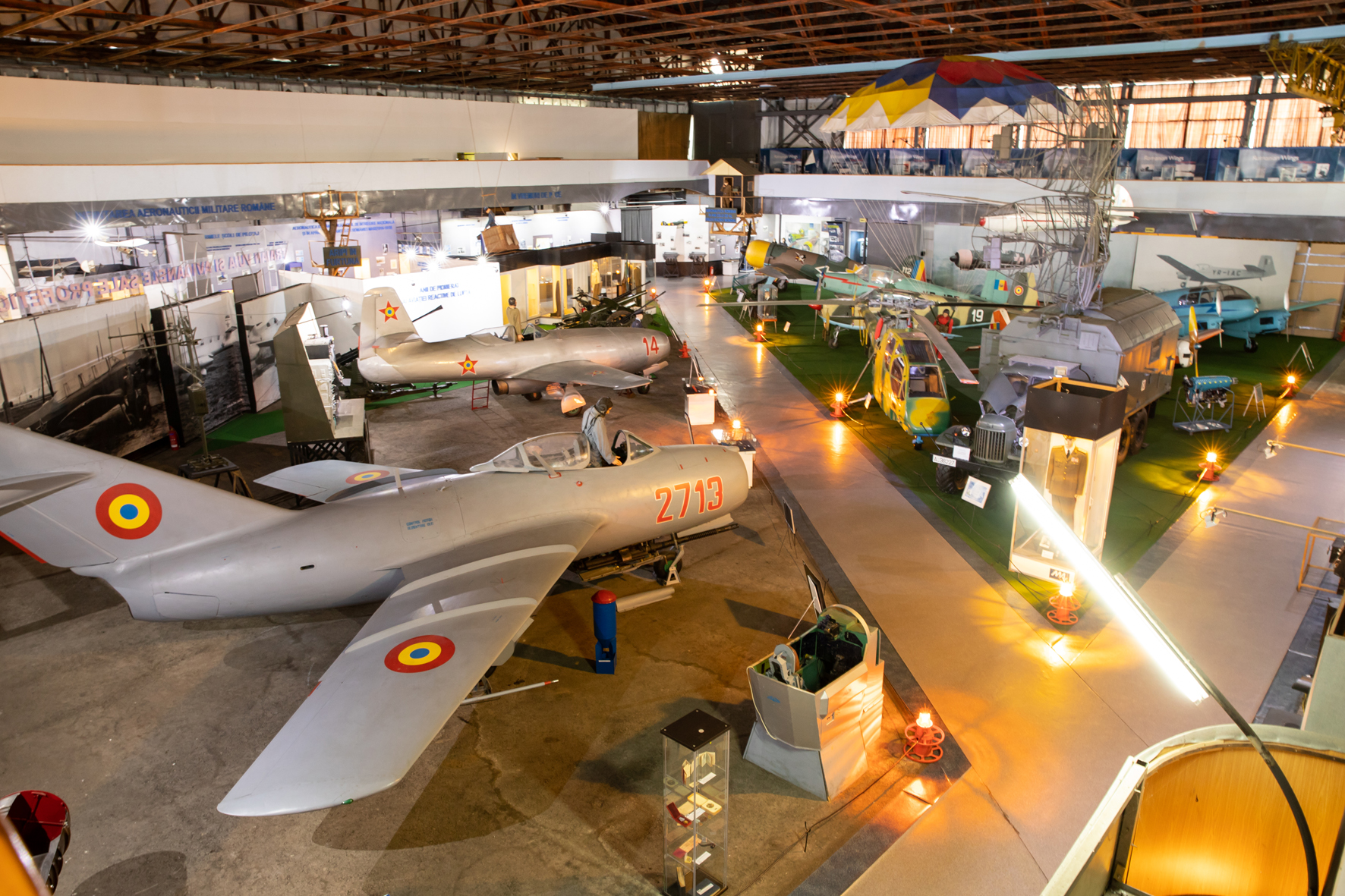
Interior view of Hangar 1

The museum endowment contains various items and documents belonging to Romanian pioneers such as Aurel Vlaicu, Henri Coandă, Elie Carafoli, and other pioneers.

The exhibits of the museums are set up in two hangar buildings:

- Hangar 1 ("Traian Vuia" Hall) - dedicated to aviation history until the end of the 1950s
- Hangar 2 - displays jet aircraft from the 1960s to 1970s, flight simulators, radiolocation equipment, and anti-aircraft artillery of that era

The two hangars are connected by a passage recreating the atmosphere of a street from the interwar period. The open-air park displays various airplanes, helicopters, radar technology, anti-aircraft guns, and surface-to-air missiles.

Besides the location in Bucharest, the museum also manages the History and Museography of Rockets and Space Research located in the Hermann Oberth memorial house in Mediaș. This section is organized in three modules: one dedicated to Conrad Haas, one to Hermann Oberth, and one to Dumitru Prunariu. The memorial house museum displays various items related to rocket technology and space travel such as a cosmonaut training suit, models of the Buran space shuttle, V-2 and Saturn V rockets.

=== Aircraft on display ===
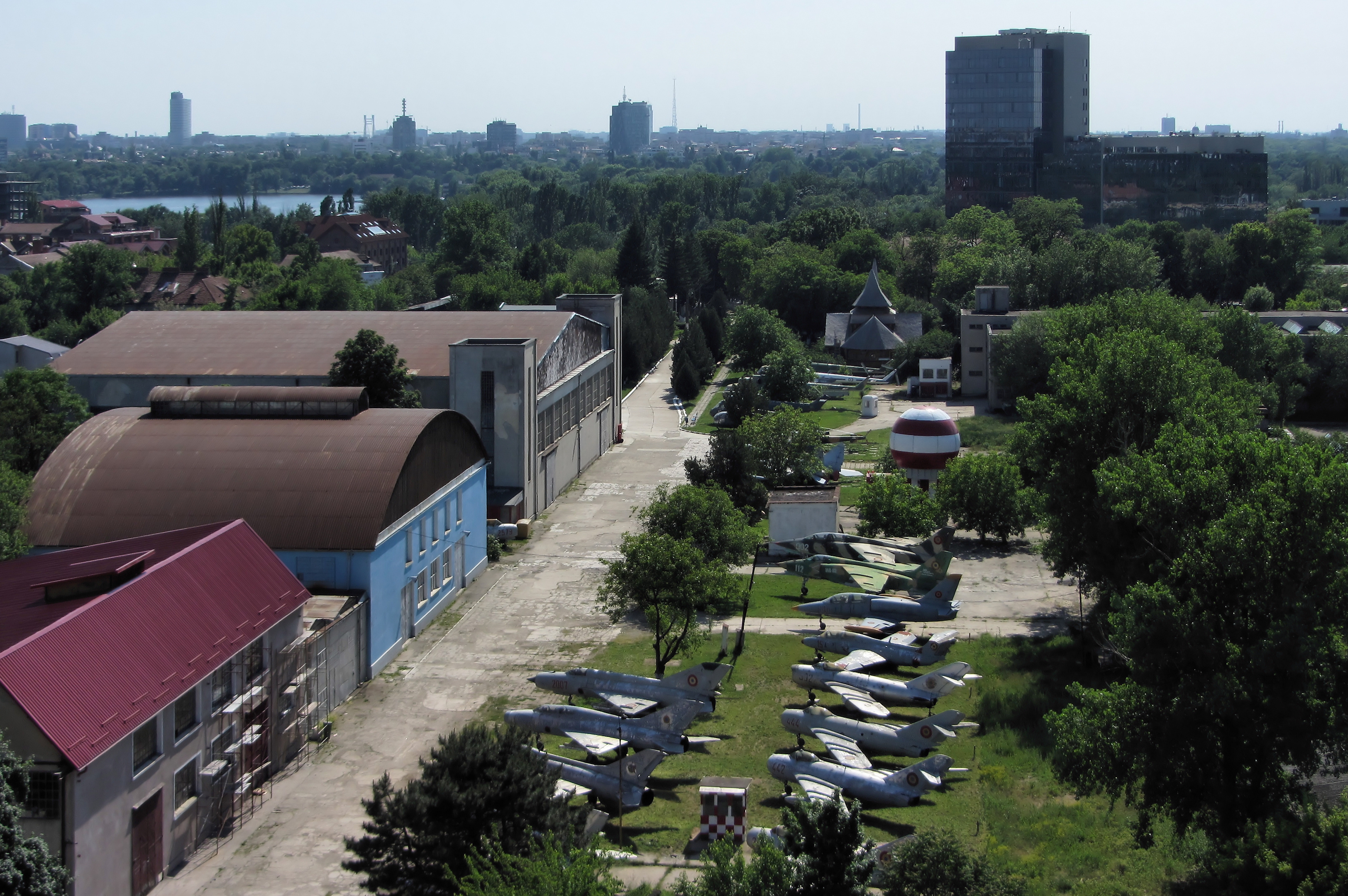
View of the open-air park and hangars

The aircraft on display include:

- Vuia 1 (replica)
- IAR 80 (replica)
- IAR 813
- IAR 823
- IAR 828
- IAR 93
- IAR 316
- IAR 317
- IAR 28MA
- Yak-23
- MiG-15
- MiG-17
- MiG-19
- MiG-21 (various models)
- MiG-29 Sniper
- Aero L-29
- Aero L-39
- BN-2 Islander

== Gallery ==
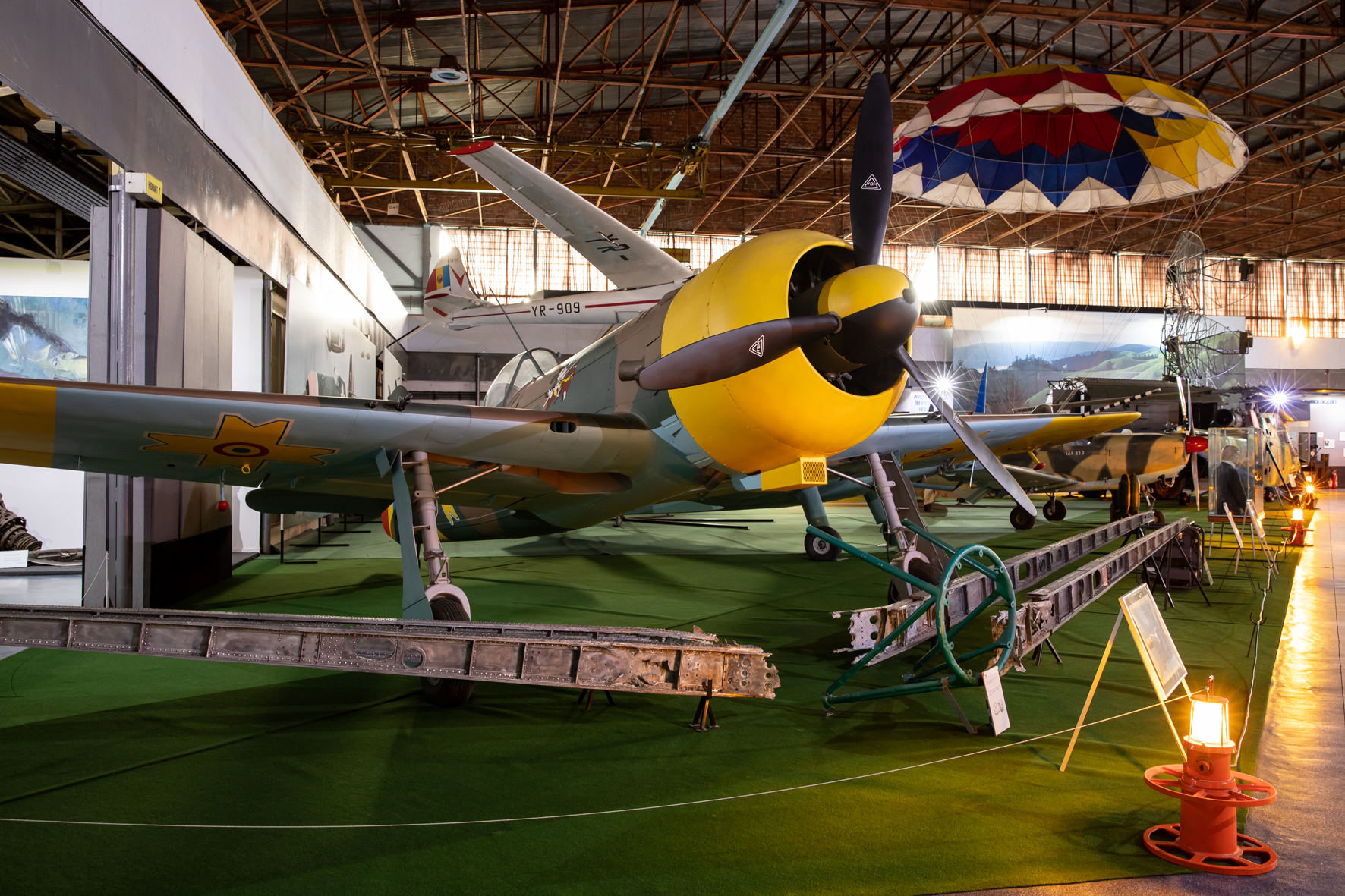
IAR 80 replica

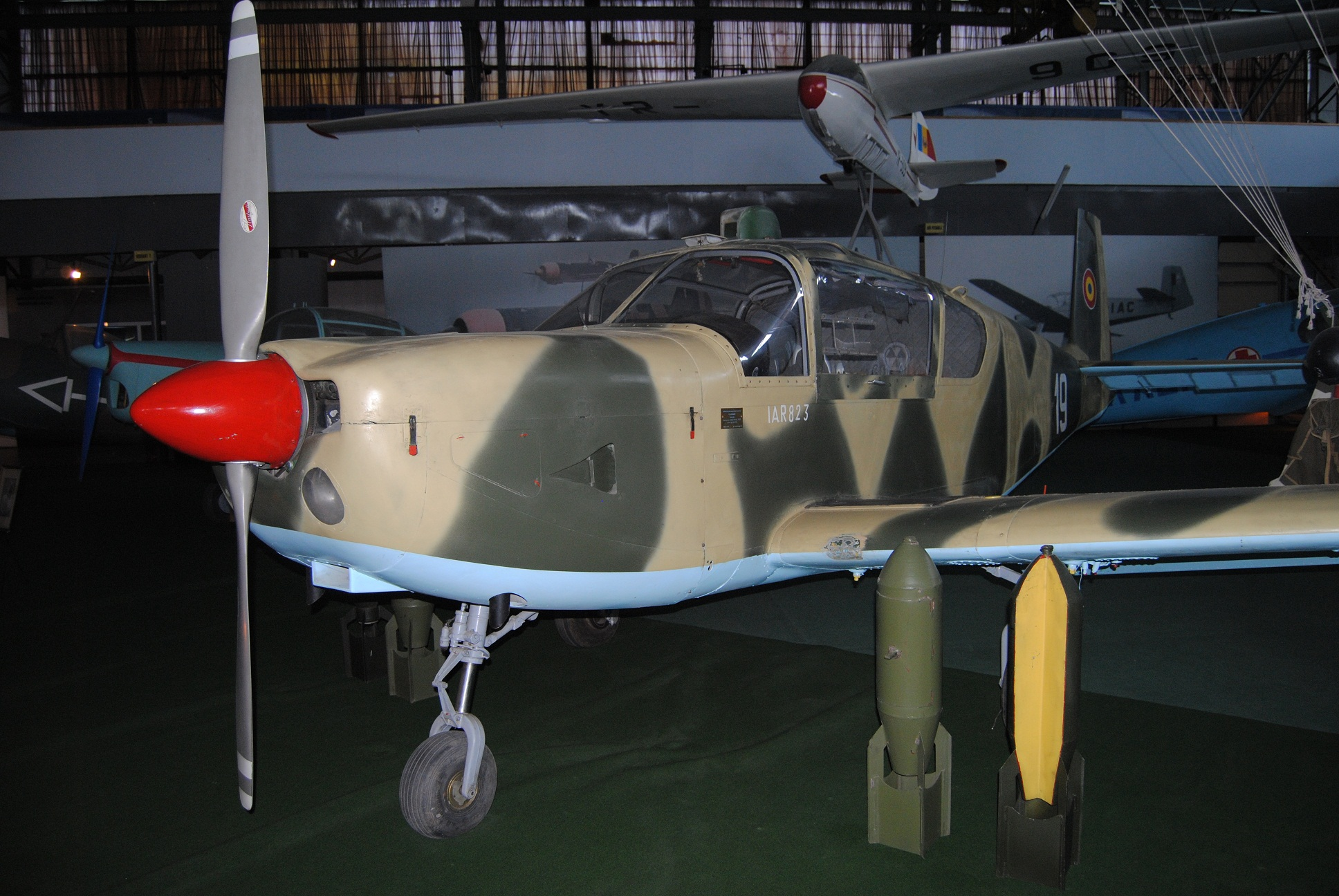
IAR 823

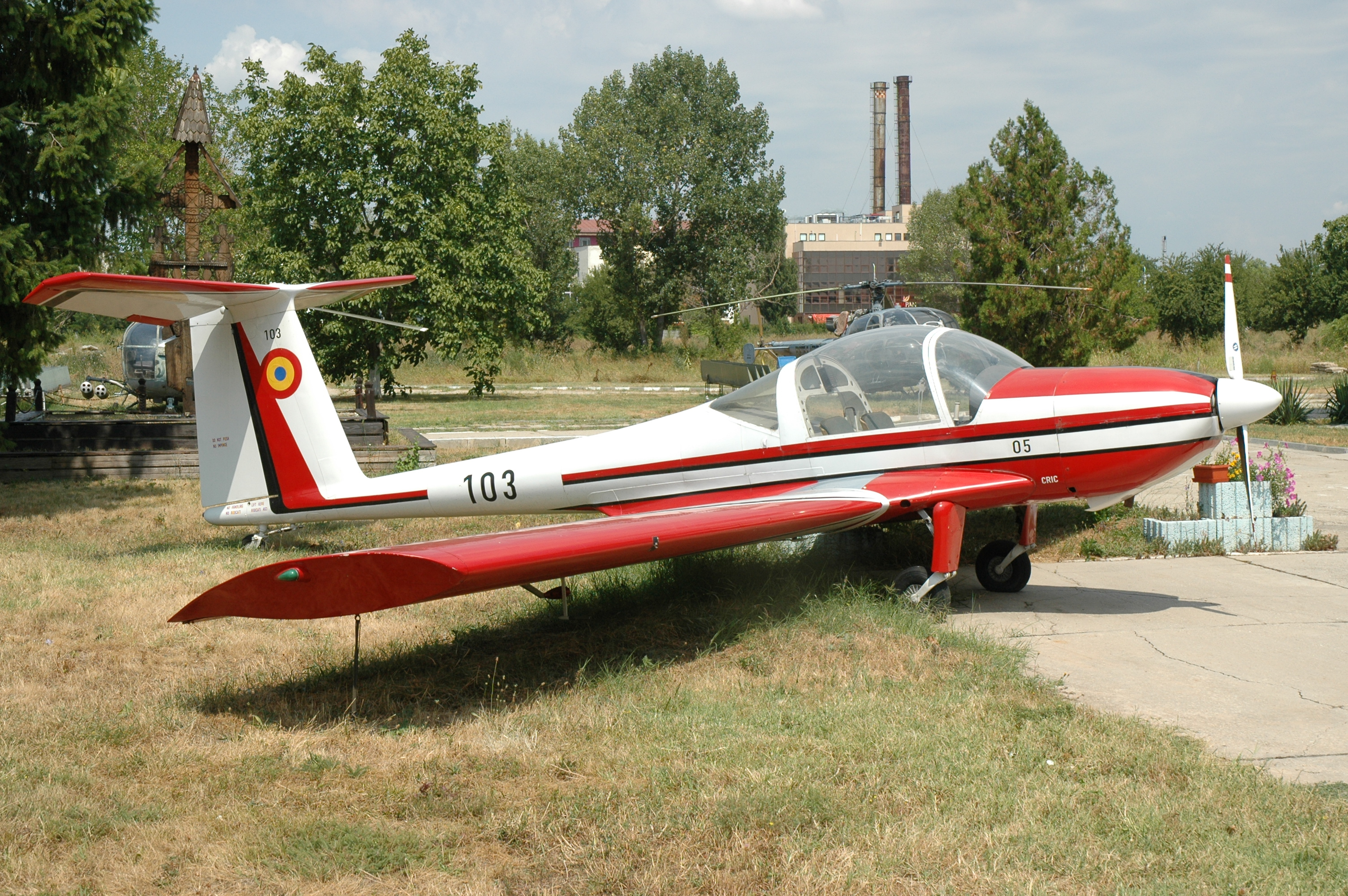
IAR 28MA

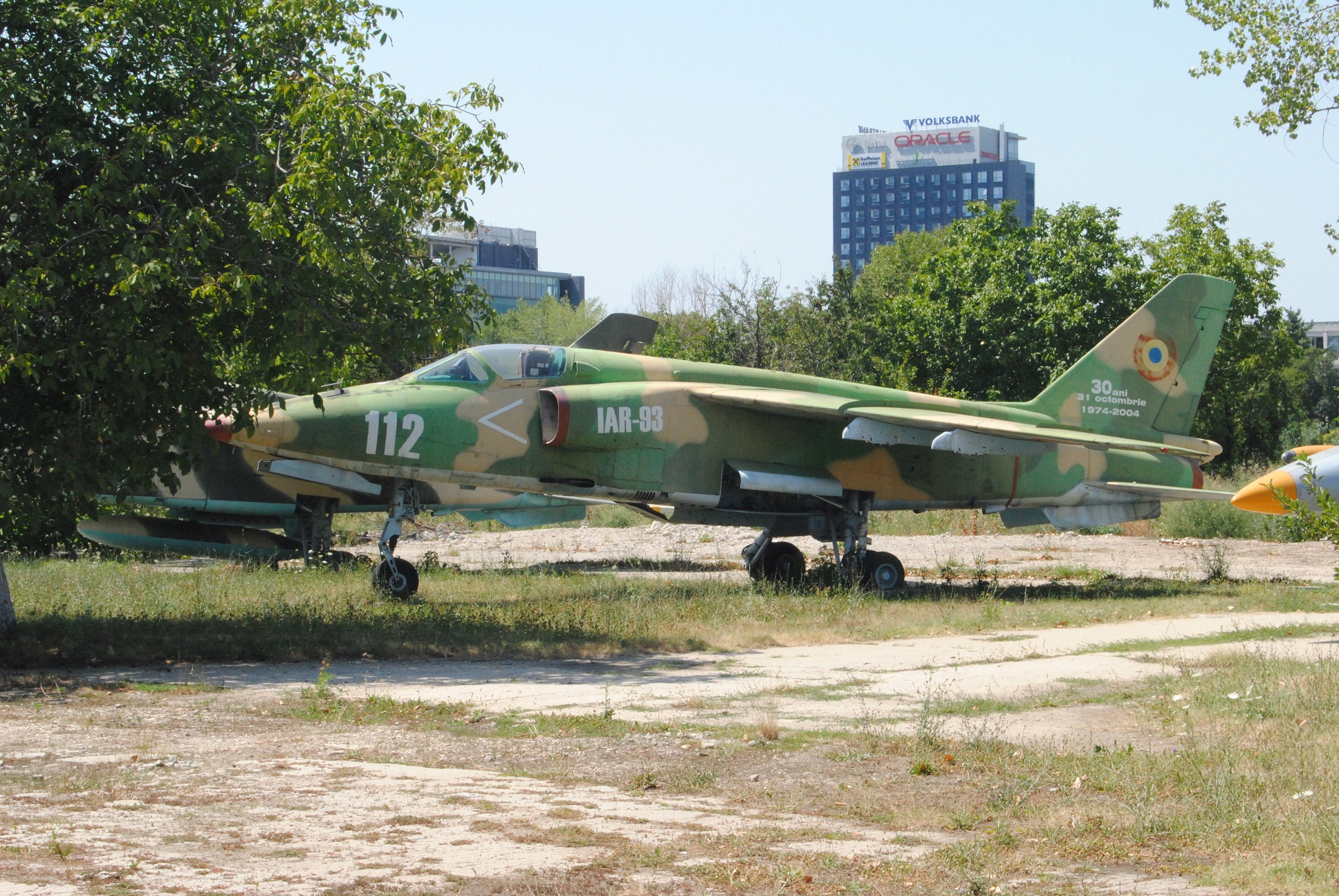
IAR-93

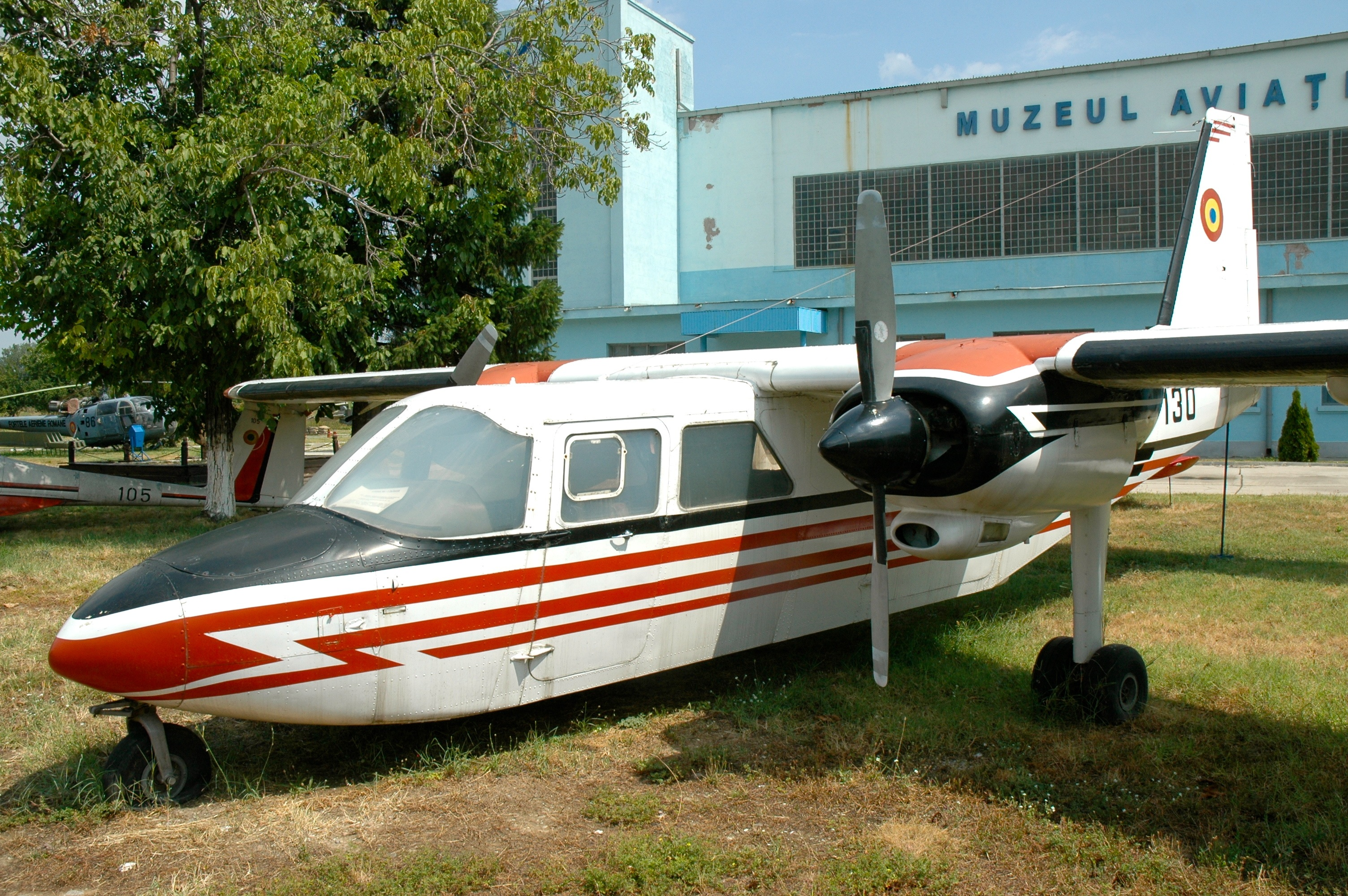
BN-2 Islander

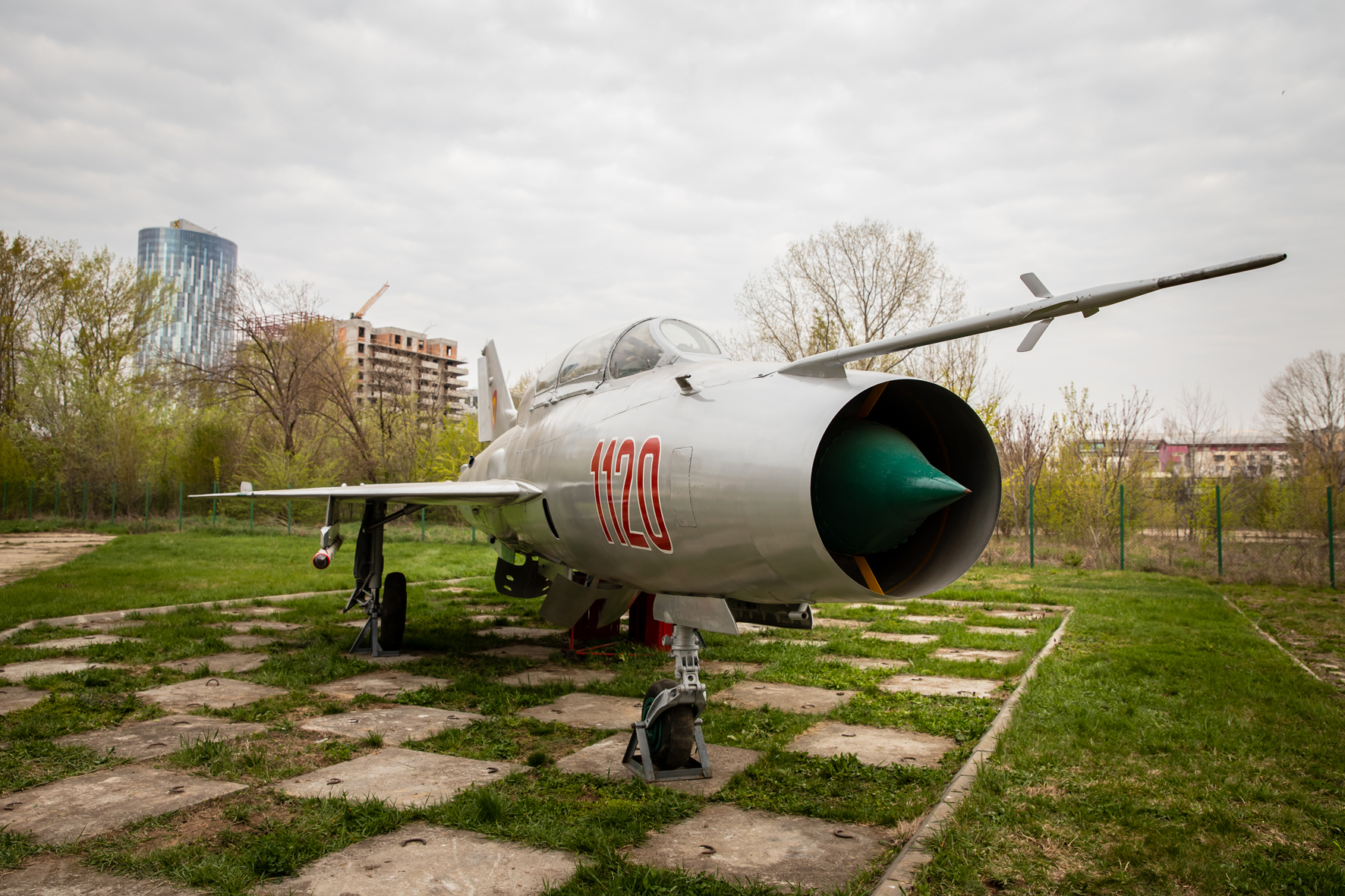
MiG-21 in the open-air exhibit

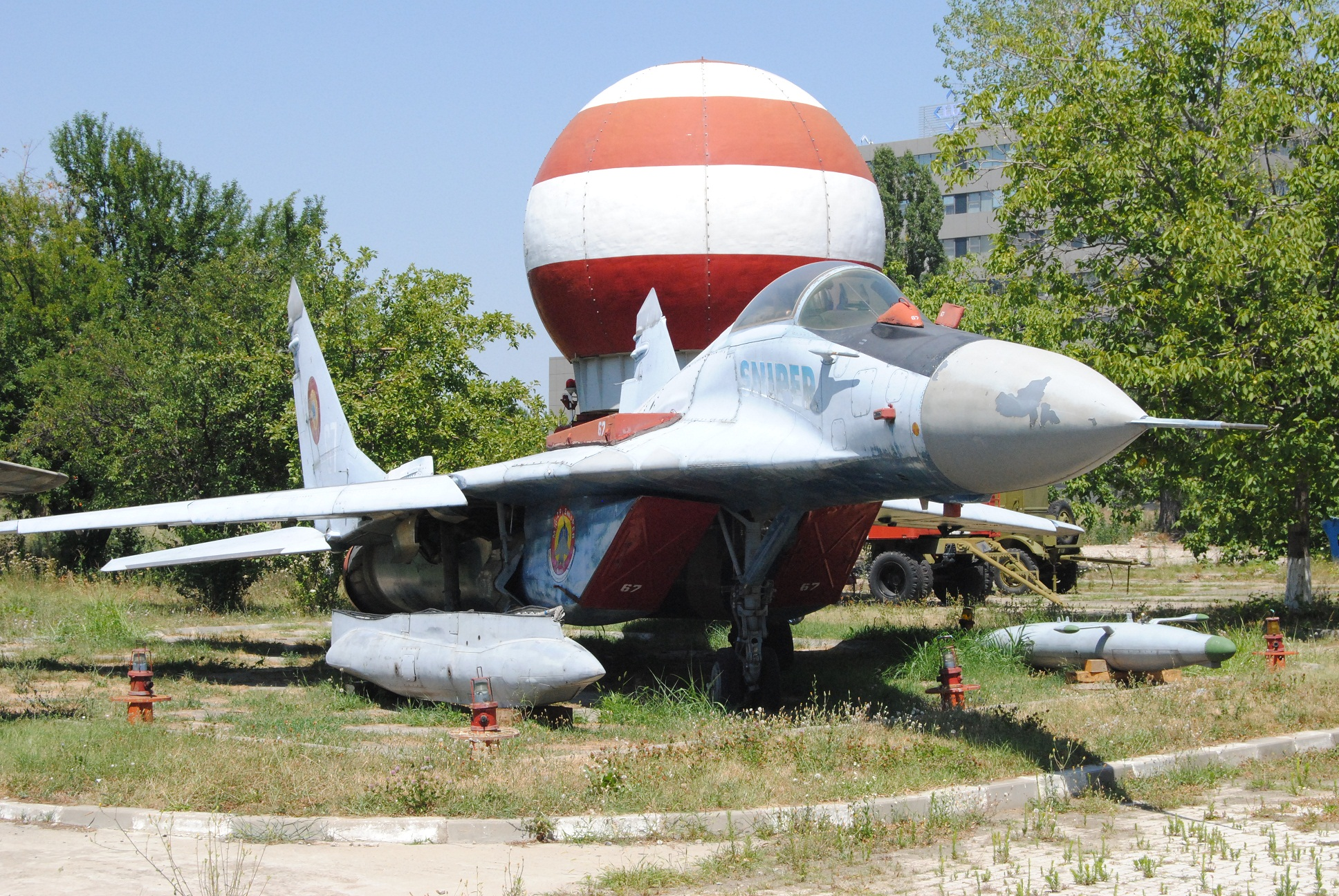
MiG-29 Sniper

== See also ==
- List of aviation museums
