= List of Romanian Air Force bases =

This is a list of Romanian Air Force air bases/airfields, past and present.

== Air bases ==
=== Active ===
Air base	ICAO /IATA airport codes	Headquarters	County	Notes
Boboc Air Base	LRBO / –	Boboc	Buzău	Location of the Aurel Vlaicu Flight School
57th Air Base "Captain Aviator Constantin Cantacuzino"	LRCK / CND	Mihail Kogălniceanu	Constanța	Commonly known as Mihail Kogălniceanu Air Base or MK Airbase.
71st Air Base "General Emanoil Ionescu"	LRCT / –	Câmpia Turzii-Luna	Cluj	
86th Air Base "Lieutenant Aviator Gheorghe Mociorniță"	LRFT / –	Fetești-Borcea	Ialomița	The base hosts the EFTC squadron which operates under the Romanian Air Force.
90th Airlift Base "Comandor Aviator Gheorghe Bănciulescu"	LROP / OTP	București-Otopeni	Ilfov	
95th Air Base "Căpitan Aviator Alexandru Șerbănescu"	LRBC / BCM	Bacău	Bacău	

=== Reserve ===
Air base	ICAO / IATA airport code	Headquarters	County	Notes
93rd Air Base	LRTR / TSR	Timișoara-Giarmata	Timiș	Fighter base that operated MiG-15/17, MiG-23 and MiG-21 aircraft until its disbandment in 2004; now an annex of the 71st Air Base hosting the 712th Helicopter Squadron, also hosting Bayraktar TB2 for the Romanian Land Forces.

=== Closed ===
Air base	ICAO /IATA airport codes	Headquarters	County	Notes
Siliștea Gumești - Balaci Air Base	–	Balaci-Siliștea Gumești	Teleorman	Constructed in the early 1950s under Soviet supervision, the airfield was transferred to the Romanian Air Force in 1953. Jet flying operations appear to have ceased in the early 1960s; however, the site continued to function as a military radio-location installation until approximately 1999.
Someșeni (Helicopter) Air Base	LRCL / –	Cluj-Napoca, Someșeni	Cluj	Someșeni served as a helicopter base during the late Cold War and post-Cold War period at Cluj International Airport. The airfield hosted Escadrila 132 Elicoptere, which operated Mil Mi-8 transport helicopters and IAR-316B Alouette III helicopters, and later received IAR-330L Puma as part of its operational inventory. The squadron remained active through the 1990s, conducting transport and support missions in the region. As part of early-2000s restructuring and force consolidation, Escadrila 132 Elicoptere formally ceased activity on 31 May 2002, and its personnel and aircraft were reassigned to Câmpia Turzii, where they were incorporated into the helicopter formation that later became Escadrila 713 Elicoptere under the 71st Air Base. This marked the end of Someșeni's function as an operational RoAF helicopter location.
19th Air Base	–	Focșani	Vrancea	Functioned primarily as a Romanian Air Force training and liaison facility with the longest grass runway in the country. It hosted the 19th Aviation School and Liaison Group (Grupul 19 Aviație Școală Legătură). The unit was disbanded in 2002 due to force restructuring, with aircraft and personnel being reassigned. On the night of 7 July 2022, residents of Focșani reported hearing low-flying military aircraft and observing what appeared to be an unplanned landing at the base. Local media subsequently confirmed that a C-130H/J military transport aircraft had landed in the middle of the night as part of joint military exercises conducted by the Israeli Defence Forces in Romania. According to reports, the aircraft's arrival was connected to coordinated training activity in the region and was not part of the regular schedule of operations at Focșani.
49th Air Base	LRIC / –	Ianca	Brăila	Opened in 1941 and expanded with appropriate fighter jet infrastructure from 1951. Operated various fighters from MiG-15 to the Romanian-made IAR-93 and IAR-99. Disbanded and closed in 2001; airfield subsequently transferred to Romanian Aeroclub and is now active as a civilian airfield.
58th (Helicopter) Air Base	LRSB / SBZ	Sibiu	Sibiu	Also referred to as Turnișor, located at Sibiu International Airport. Hosted the 58th Helicopter Group with IAR-330H and IAR-316 helicopters. As part of the 2002 reorganization, the group was reorganized as a squadron and assigned to RoAF 71st Air Base. The site now hosts a new military unit.
59th (Helicopter) Air Base	LRTZ / –	Tuzla	Constanța	Coastal air base active during the Cold War and post-1989 period, associated mainly with helicopter and maritime-support missions. Disbanded during early-2000s restructuring; the airfield is presently operated by the Romanian Naval Forces and for civilian use.
60th (Helicopter) Air Base	–	Tecuci	Galați	The RoAF traces the origins of the Aviation Training Center to the Tecuci, where personnel training was conducted from the interwar/early modern period into the early jet era. In the 1950s, the local aviation school received the name Școala Militară de Aviație „Aurel Vlaicu” and was later relocated to Boboc (or Ziliștea as it was known) in 1958. As of September 2024, the infrastructure that remained was demolished.
61st (Helicopter) Air Base	LRTI / –	Titu-Boteni	Dâmbovița	ICAO not in use. Boteni Air Base (commonly referred to as Titu) served RoAF from World War II to the early jet period with MiG-15 operations and later moving only to helicopter units consisting of IAR-330 and IAR-316. During the early 2000s force restructuring, the base was disbanded, marking the end of its military role. The airfield infrastructure was subsequently transferred and incorporated into the Renault Titu automotive testing facility.
67th Air Base	LRCV / CRA	Craiova	Dolj	Functioned as air base until 2004 with the military site now being part of the Center for Research, Innovation and Flight Tests (Centrul de cercetare, inovare și încercări în zbor), also HQ for Avioane Craiova.
73rd (Helicopter) Air Base	LRCS / CSB	Caransebeș	Caraș-Severin	Served as a jet fighter base from 1953, operating Yak-23 aircraft before fighter activity ceased in 1960. Reactivated in 1984 as a helicopter base, it later hosted the 73rd Helicopter Group until its disbandment in the early 2000s restructure. The airfield subsequently transitioned to civilian control, with use by IGAv and for multinational exercises.
91st Air Base	LRDS / –	Caracal-Deveselu	Olt	ICAO not in use. Key interceptor base, constructed in 1952 and home to MiG-21F-13 fighters from 1962 as part of the 91st Fighter Aviation Regiment overlooking Romania's southern airspace. Throughout the 1980s it hosted multiple squadrons operating night and day to protect national air defence. The base was disbanded in 2003 during Romanian Air Force restructuring as flying operations ended. In 2011 Romania and the United States agreed to establish a NATO ballistic missile defence facility on the site, and the Aegis Ashore system became operational in 2016, transforming Deveselu into one of NATO's strategic missile defence installations, becoming the 99th Military Base Deveselu.
94th (Helicopter) Air Base	–	Alexeni	Ialomița	Developed in the mid-1950s into a major base with the Regimentul 94 Elicoptere (1965). The Romanian-made IAR-93 was first presented here. The base hosted various helicopters that were used by the RoAF and it was eventually disbanded in 2001 during force restructuring, with Mi-8 helicopters redistributed or being retired entirely; the airfield has since remained inactive pending redevelopment proposals from the civilian sector.

== Airfields ==
=== Active ===
Airfield	Headquarters	County	Notes
Buzău Airfield	Buzău City	Buzău	Airfield used for advanced flight training before 1939, was rated for bombers. Currently it is still active as a military site with a small grass airfield which rarely used.

=== Closed ===
Airfield	County	Notes
Aiud	Alba	Emergency landing ground; exact location not determined. Listed as available in August 1941.
Alba Iulia	Alba	Emergency landing ground; 46°06′40.0″N 23°36′40.0″E. Grass surface measuring approx. 1580 x 805 meters with an irregular shape, documented on 28 May 1944.
Alexandria	Teleorman	Landing ground rated for bombers; existed pre-war and used as a forward landing ground by Luftwaffe dive bombers, fighters and tactical reconnaissance aircraft during the spring 1941 campaign Balkans, then inactivated. 43°57′00.0″N 25°22′00.0″E.
Alioș	Timiș	Field airstrip and emergency landing ground; exact location not determined. Rated for single-engine aircraft. Dimensions documented and measured 450 x 450 meters in 1941.
Andrășești	Ialomița	Emergency landing ground; Exact location not determined. Documented 31 December 1943.
Arad-Ceala	Arad	Airfield in Arad; existed pre-war and used by the Luftwaffe during the spring 1941 Balkan campaign. Airfield inactive from May 41 until late 1943 when some development work began then said to have become the main airport of the city, now known as Arad International Airport.
Arad-Gai	Arad	Airfield of the village of Gai; rated for bombers. A pre-war civil airport. Heavily used by the Luftwaffe during the spring 1941 Balkan campaign. The few small buildings that had existed here were gone by Nov 1943.
Bacău-Margineni	Bacău	Established during the First World War. Classified as a field airstrip in December 1943. Approximate coordinates 46°37′50.0″N 26°52′30.0″E.
Bacău-Trotuș	Bacău	Field airstrip with name being derived from a nearby river in the south. Documented coordinates in 1944 show the airstrip being located in the same location as of the current Bacău International Airport, which also functions as RoAF's 95th Airbase.
Băicoi-Țintea	Prahova	Emergency landing ground; 45°01′00.0″N 25°49′05.0″E. Documented on 31 December 1943.
Bălcești	Vâlcea	Emergency landing; exact location not determined but probably 44°37′00.0″N 23°57′00.0″E. Documented on 31 December 1943.
Balomir (Balomiru de Câmp)	Alba	Landing ground rated for bombers; used by the Luftwaffe as a transit field in spring 1941 and then again from Apr to Aug 44. Limited evidence suggests that it was inactive between those two time periods. Documented in 1944. Approximate location 45°55′30.0″N 23°21′40.0″E.
Balta Doamnei	Prahova	Landing ground in 1941 as the land was requisitioned in 1939. Approximate location 44°45′43.9″N 26°14′20.3″E.
Balta Greaca	Călărași	Seaplane anchorage on the former Lake Balta Greaca. Believed to have been used by Luftwaffe seaplanes flying to and from Greece, no other details. Approximate location 44°05′00.0″N 26°22′30.0″E.
Bârlad	Vaslui	Classified as field airstrip; rated for multi-engine aircraft. Existed in 1940 and was used by Romanian fighters during the June 1941 attack on the Soviet Union. Approximate location 46°13′35.0″N 27°38′42.0″E.
Barticești Ferdinand	Neamț	Landing ground; rated for single-engine aircraft in 1941. Approximate location 47°04′00.0″N 26°46′00.0″E.
Beiuș	Bihor	Emergency landing ground; had a take-off and landing run of 825 meters. Approximate location 46°39′00.0″N 22°22′40.0″E.
Berteștii de Jos	Brăila	Initially a private landing ground before World War II, finally became emergency landing ground. Approximate location 44°50′40.0″N 27°44′40.0″E.
Bilciurești	Dâmbovița	Emergency landing ground; documented around 1943. Approximate location 44°44′20.0″N 25°48′44.0″E.
Bistrița	Bistrița-Năsăud	Emergency landing ground; used until August 1940. Approximate location 47°04′35.0″N 24°34′25.0″E.
Blaj	Alba	Operational airfield with landing ground rated for multi-engine aircraft in 1941. Approximate location 46°10′15.0″N 23°56′40.0″E.
Boița-Tălmaciu (Boița-Tălmacel)	Sibiu	Emergency landing ground; documented around 1943. Approximate location 45°38′20.0″N 24°15′35.0″E.
Bosancea	Suceava	Landing ground; rated for single-engine aircraft in 1941. Approximate location 47°35′00.0″N 26°18′00.0″E.
Botoșani	Botoșani	Landing ground; rated for single-engine aircraft in 1940. Used briefly. Approximate location 47°44′23.0″N 26°41′40.0″E.
Botoșești	Dolj	Emergency landing ground; measuring approx. 685 x 685 meters. Approximate location 44°24′00.0″N 23°17′00.0″E.
Brad	Hunedoara	Emergency landing ground; listed as available in August 1941. Approximate location 46°07′40.0″N 22°47′30.0″E.
Brăila	Brăila	Landing ground rarely used. Approximate location 45°16′00.0″N 27°57′00.0″E.
Brănești	Ilfov	Landing ground used in 1941; grass surface measuring approx. 1000 x 410 meters. Approximate location 44°27′25.0″N 26°20′00.0″E.
Brănețul	Olt	Emergency landing ground; Exact location not determined.
Brașov	Brașov	Large Operational airfield that also served as the factory airfield for Industria Aeronautică Română (IAR) that was built 1925–27. Approximate location 45°40′43.6″N 25°37′03.4″E, to not be confused with the current IAR Ghimbav location.
București-Bârseșu	București	Emergency landing ground in Bucharest city; likely to have been used for glider training. Measuring approx. 540 x 455 meters. May have been a satellite field of nearby Popești-Leordeni airfield. Approximate location 44°23′45.0″N 26°09′00.0″E.
București-Cotroceni	București	Airfield established in 1912 as the first military flight training school. Location of the Aeronautical Arsenal since 1919; rated for single-engine aircraft. Currently the Drumul Taberei neighbourhood takes its place. Approximate location 44°25′50.0″N 26°03′15.0″E.
București-Giulești "Romeo Popescu"	București	Operational airfield used as civil aviation training school and occasionally by Royal Romanian Air Forces from 1939, the airfield was named after Romanian aviator Romeo Popescu; it was taken over by the Luftwaffe in early 1941 and used as a transit field. Was rarely used after June 1941 and apparently turned into a logistics and support facility. Later, in 1959 it was closed. Approximate location 44°29′41.8″N 26°00′49.9″E.
București-Pipera (Pipera Airport)	Ilfov	Operational airfield used from 1915 and rated for all types of aircraft. It was used as a fighter station for the protection of Bucharest and the Ploiești refinery complex until June 1942. It was dismantled in 1958 and currently it hosts the National Aviation Museum of Romania. Location 44°22′35.0″N 26°11′30.0″E.
București-Popești-Leordeni	Ilfov	Operational airfield used from 1939; Initially home to an instrument flight training school and a parachute training school, the airfield was taken over by the Luftwaffe in early 1941 and used until June 1941. It subsequently functioned as a Romanian center for aircraft repairs and as a fighter base for the protection of Bucharest and the Ploiești refinery complex. The airfield remained in military use until 1960s, when it was closed and dismantled. Approximate location 44°22′35.0″N 26°11′30.0″E.
București-Tunari	Ilfov	Classified as field airstrip; rated for single-engine aircraft. It was laid out in 1939 to be used as a satellite base for Otopeni and Pipera. Approximate location 44°33′20.0″N 26°09′25.0″E.
Buziaș	Timiș	Emergency landing ground; exact location is unknown. Documented in 1943 and reportedly had take-off and landing runs of 640 meters.
Căiata	Vrancea	Functioned as a private landing ground before World War II that was later captured by the Luftwaffe in 1944 and then used as auxiliary field for other bases. Unsure if it was used by the Royal Romanian Air Force. Approximate location 45°28′50.0″N 27°06′40.0″E.
Călărași	Călărași	Civilian airfield built around 1936-37 which was later used for military purposes such as evacuation between here and Crimea in 1944. It was rated for single-engine aircraft in 1941. Approximate location 44°13′00.0″N 27°19′35.0″E.
Câmpina	Prahova	Private landing ground built before World War II which was used predominantly by the Luftwaffe from 1941. Approximate location 45°07′00.0″N 25°44′00.0″E.
Câmpulung	Argeș	Emergency landing ground; exact location unknown. Documented 31 December 1943.
Caracal	Olt	Classified as field airstrip; rated for single-engine aircraft in 1941. Approximate location 44°06′00.0″N 24°21′00.0″E.
Cârlomănești	Galați	Simple landing ground in the village; exact location unknown.
Carol I (Ciocârlia)	Constanța	Landing ground; built sometime in 1943. Used during evacuations of Crimea in 1944. Approximate location 44°21′00.0″N 28°22′00.0″E.
Cernavodă	Constanța	Emergency landing ground; leveled grass surface measuring approx. 410 x 35 meters. Approximate location 44°20′10.0″N 28°02′30.0″E.
Chevereș (Chevereșu Mare)	Timiș	Operational field; even though it was built by Luftwaffe in December 1943, it was not used by them. Approximate location 45°40′00.0″N 21°29′00.0″E.
Cioara Doicești	Ialomița	Landing ground; rated for bombers in 1941. Approximate location: 44°45′30.0″N 27°33′51.0″E.
Cobadin	Constanța	Emergency landing ground. Approximate location: 44°04′15.0″N 28°13′50.0″E.
Constanța-Mamaia	Constanța	Operational airfield which existed by 1930 and served as a training school for gunnery and bombing. Initially rated for single-engine aircraft, its classification was upgraded to bomber operations in December 1943. During the Second World War it was jointly used by the Royal Romanian Air Force and the Luftwaffe, primarily by fighter and other single-engine units. In October 1943 it was ordered equipped with fighter control apparatus for use as a fighter base. Its hangars can still be seen today as they remain intact, however with major damage. Approximate location 44°18′30.0″N 28°36′30.0″E.
Constanța-Palas (Constanța City)	Constanța	Civilian airport built in 1932; was built near Viile Noi-Palas hence the name. Converted and used mainly for military purposes in World War II by the Royal Romanian Air Force and Luftwaffe, functioning also as a transport hub during the April–May 1944 evacuation of Crimea. As the city continued to expand in the early 1960s around the airport and couldn't allow for further expansion and proper functionality, it was decided that the airport would close and all flights be moved to Mihail Kogalniceanu.
Cornul (Cornu de Jos)	Prahova	Private landing ground used before World War II; later used as emergency landing ground with surface measuring 730 x 365 meters with an irregular shape. Approximate location: 44°50′20.0″N 26°15′40.0″E.
Craiova-Braniște (Balta Verde)	Dolj	Used as emergency landing ground and by 1944 it was abandoned. Currently it is in civilian use with the Romanian Aeroclub as the Craiova Balta Verde Aerodrome. Location 44°16′51.8″N 23°47′28.9″E.
Dărmănești	Bacău	Private landing ground pre-war; was used as emergency landing ground. Measuring approx. 730 x 320 meters. Approximate location 46°22′45.0″N 26°29′50.0″E.
Deta	Timiș	Landing ground; also served as an important forward field for fighters during the attack on Yugoslavia in April 1941. It saw little to no activity after mid 194. Approximate location 45°24′00.0″N 21°14′20.0″E.
Deva	Hunedoara	Private landing ground used pre-war; set up later as emergency landing ground. Reportedly had take-off and landing runs of 825 meters. Approximate location 45°53′00.0″N 22°54′25.0″E.
Dragalina	Călărași	Classified as field airstrip, rated for bombers in 1941. Approximate location 44°24′19.0″N 27°23′00.0″E.
Drăgănești	Teleorman	Emergency landing ground; exact location unknown. Reportedly had take-off and landing runs of 825 meters.
Dragoș Vodă	Călărași	Classified as landing ground; exact location in relation to town not known. Rated for bomber aircraft in 1941 and it measured 1000 x 1000 meters.
Făgăraș	Brașov	Emergency landing ground; exact location unknown.
Fălticeni	Suceava	Emergency landing ground; exact location unknown.
Filipeștii de Târg	Prahova	Emergency landing ground; exact location unknown.
Filipești-Galbeni	Bacău	Emergency landing ground; exact location unknown. Surface measuring approx. 730 x 730 meters
Florești	Prahova	Private landing ground used before World War II; later used by fighters during the war. Approximate location 45°03′30.0″N 25°47′35.0″E., in proximity to Bănești aerodrome.
Focșani North	Vrancea	Landing ground; rated for bombers, it served primarily as a satellite and alternate landing ground for Focșani South. Used occasionally by the Luftwaffe from July 1941. Measured approximately 1000 × 2300 m with a grass surface prone to becoming unserviceable in wet weather. Light infrastructure was added by late 1943. Bombed by USAAF B-17s on 11 June 1944. Approximate location 45°44′15.0″N 27°11′30.0″E.
Focșani South	Vrancea	Operational airfield; rated for all aircraft classes, it functioned as a bomber base in June–July 1941, then mainly as a transit field following the German advance into Ukraine and Russia. Reactivated in spring 1944 during the German retreat into Romania. After World War II, the south base became the 19th Air Base which also later closed down in 2002.
Frumușica Tărgul	Botoșani	Landing ground; rated for single-engine aircraft in 1941. Measured 500 x 600 meters. Location not determined.
Frunzeasca	Galați	Emergency landing ground; exact location unknown.
Fundulea	Călărași	Emergency landing ground; exact location unknown.
Găești	Dâmbovița	Emergency landing ground; exact location unknown. In 1941 it was taken over by the Luftwaffe.
Galați	Galați	Operational Airfield which was located in the city. A pre-war joint civil and military airport existing since at least 1920, it was rated for bombers and improved by the Luftwaffe in 1941. From autumn 1941 until spring-summer 1944 it functioned mainly as an aircraft repair and overhaul center and as a fighter training base. Measured approximately 1000 × 1100 m in 1941–43 (later about 1050 × 960 m in August 1944), with a grass surface and no paved runway. Bombed by the US 15th Air Force on 6 June 1944, with reported destruction of aircraft, barracks and damage to hangars and repair facilities. After the war the airport continued operating for several years, but was closed in 1958 on grounds of inefficiency. The site was subsequently redeveloped: industrial facilities were built on the former airfield, several hangars were incorporated into production use, new streets were laid out, and from 1970 the “Cartierul Aeroport” residential district was constructed. Approximate location 45°27′20.0″N 28°01′40.0″E.
Galda de Jos	Alba	Landing ground used before World War II; was later obstructed with trenches during the war. Measuring approx. 1920 x 1920 x 1920 meters. Approximate location 46°10′30.0″N 23°40′00.0″E.
Giurgiu	Giurgiu	Landing ground built sometime before World War II; was used by Luftwaffe fighters in 1941. Measuring approx. 1280 x 1000 meters. Approximate location 43°55′00.0″N 26°00′16.0″E.
Glavacioc	Argeș	Landing ground. Approximate location 44°28′00.0″N 25°14′00.0″E.
Grind	Turda	Landing ground with unknown origin; It was one of several satellites and alternate landing grounds in the vicinity of Turda. Measuring approx. 1280 x 340 meters. Currently, the Luncani Airfield is active in the same location. Approximate location 46°28′35.0″N 23°55′30.0″E.
Hârșova	Constanța	Emergency landing ground; exact location unknown. Reportedly had take-off and landing runs of 730 meters.
Homorod	Brașov	Emergency landing ground; exact location unknown. Reportedly had take-off and landing runs of 640 meters.
Huși	Vaslui	Operational field airstrip; rated for single-engine aircraft, it was constructed by the Luftwaffe and operated as a frontline fighter-bomber base from March to August 1944 during fighting in eastern Romania. Probably abandoned after the war. Approximate location 46°40′00.0″N 28°04′00.0″E.
Iași-South	Iași	Operational airfield; rated for all aircraft classes, it existed as a military airfield from at least 1920, was ceded to the Soviet Union in June 1940, and reoccupied by Romania in July 1941. From mid-July 1941 it was heavily used by the Luftwaffe in support of operations on the Eastern Front, saw reduced activity from late 1941 to early 1944, and became active again until August 1944 during Axis defensive operations in north-eastern Romania. Approximate location 47°09′30.0″N 27°38′05.0″E. Currently, the Territorial Aeroclub "Alexandru Matei" Iaşi operates here under the Romanian Aeroclub with ICAO LRIS.
Ivești	Galați	Landing ground. Approximate location 45°41′23.0″N 27°32′06.0″E.
Jegălia	Călărași	Operational field airstrip; rated for single-engine aircraft. Measuring approximately 800 × 1800 m, Approximate location 44°17′00.0″N 27°38′00.0″E., although not confirmed.
Jiblea (Jiblea Veche)	Vâlcea	Emergency landing ground; exact location unknown.
Jilavele	Ialomița	Emergency landing ground; exact location unknown.
Lugoj	Timiș	Landing ground; rated for single-engine aircraft, functioned as a pre-war civil airstrip and was enlarged early in the Second World War, with construction of a hangar begun but apparently not completed. Grass surface with no paved runway; expanded by 1944 to approximately 1490 × 730 m. Likely abandoned after the war. Approximate location 45°41′20.0″N 21°56′00.0″E.
Mânăstirea	Călărași	Emergency landing ground; exact location unknown, although likely to be around 44°12′35.0″N 26°54′14.0″E.
Mangalia	Constanța	Emergency landing ground; rated for single-engine aircraft. Approximate location 43°48′30.0″N 28°35′00.0″E.
Matca	Galați	Landing ground; believed to be a satellite of or alternate landing ground for Tecuci airfield. Approximate location 45°51′36.0″N 27°33′33.0″E.
Medgidia	Constanța	Emergency landing ground; exact location unknown.
Mediaș	Sibiu	Operational airfield; rated for single-engine aircraft, it existed by 1939 as a flight school and training center for aviation engineers and mechanics. During the Second World War it continued to function primarily as a technical and training base. Grass surface with no paved runway; expanded by early 1944 to approximately 1180 × 420 m. Approximate location 46°10′25.0″N 24°22′30.0″E.
Meri	Prahova	Landing ground; Believed to have been built by the Germans in late 1943 or early 1944 as a fighter field for the defense of Bucharest and Ploiești. Approximate location 44°50′02.0″N 26°18′16.0″E.
Mihai Bravul	Giurgiu	Landing ground; Origin uncertain. Measuring approximately 595 × 410 m with no paved runway; A nearby Romanian Army training camp immediately north of the field likely provided administrative and billeting support. Approximate location 44°06′40.0″N 26°04′05.0″E.
Miroși	Argeș	Emergency landing ground; measuring approx. 550 x 550 meters. Approximate location 44°25′00.0″N 24°54′00.0″E.
Mizil	Prahova	Operational field airstrip; rated for bombers. Initially used by Romanian fighter units until mid-1941, it was subsequently taken over by the Luftwaffe and operated by fighter replacement and operational units until August 1944.o Originally about 1200 × 600 m (later restated as 1100 × 700 m) and expanded by July 1944 to approximately 1785 × 915 m. Was equipped with hangars, workshops, refueling points, bulk fuel storage and an ammunition dump. Also protected by Romanian anti-aircraft defenses in summer 1944. Approximate location 45°00′45.0″N 26°25′30.0″E.
Moreni	Dâmbovița	Emergency landing ground; before the Second World War it was used as a private landing ground. Measuring approx. 825 x 640 meters. Approximate location 44°58′00.0″N 25°42′45.0″E.
Orșova	Mehedinți	Emergency landing ground; exact location unknown.
Orzari	Constanța	Field airstrip; rated for single-engine aircraft. Measured 1000 x 1000 meters. Approximate location 43°55′00.0″N 28°18′00.0″E.
Pașcani	Iași	Landing ground; rated for bombers, it was laid out in early 1941 in preparation for operations against the Soviet Union. Measuring approximately 1000 × 350 m in 1941. Approximate location 47°14′00.0″N 26°43′00.0″E.
Pecica	Arad	Emergency landing ground; exact location unknown. Reportedly had take-off and landing runs of approx. 640 meters
Periam	Timiș	Emergency landing ground; exact location unknown. Reportedly had take-off and landing runs of approx. 825 meters.
Perieți	Olt	Emergency landing ground. Approximate location 44°24′30.0″N 24°32′50.0″E.
Petroșani	Hunedoara	Landing ground; exact location unknown.
Piatra Neamț	Neamț	Landing ground; rated for single-engine aircraft. Originally measuring approximately 300 × 600 m in 1941, the grass landing area was reportedly enlarged during the war to about 915 × 730 m. Approximate location 46°55′55.0″N 26°22′00.0″E.
Pitești	Argeș	Landing ground; measuring approximately 1000 × 915 m, roughly rectangular in shape, with no paved runway. Was also used by the Luftwaffe in spring 1941. Currently the Territorial Aeroclub "Henri Coandă" Piteşti operates here under the Romanian Aeroclub with ICAO LRPT.
Plenița	Dolj	Emergency landing ground; which served as a pre-war private landing ground that also functioned as an elementary flying school. Approximate location 44°13′00.0″N 23°11′10.0″E.
Ploiești-North	Prahova	Used as a private landing ground before the Second World War. Later used as emergency landing ground. Approximate location 44°57′50.0″N 26°03′10.0″E.
Poenari-Ulmi	Giurgiu	Emergency landing ground; measuring approx. 640 x 455 meters. Approximate location 44°29′10.0″N 25°46′15.0″E.
Pogoanele	Buzău	Classified as field airstrip; rated for bombers. Used operationally by Romanian Savoia-Marchetti SM.79 bomber units during the June 1941 invasion of the Soviet Union. Measuring approximately 1000 × 800 m (1941 and December 1943 figures). Approximate location 44°56′00.0″N 26°58′00.0″E.
Prejmer	Brașov	Classified as field airstrip; rated for all aircraft classes. Measuring approximately 1400 × 900 m (1941 and December 1943 figures). Approximate location 45°44′00.0″N 25°47′00.0″E.
Pufești	Vrancea	Landing ground; rated for bombers. Measured 1200 x 1100 meters in 1941. Approximate location 45°59′00.0″N 27°09′00.0″E.
Pungești	Vaslui	Emergency landing ground; exact location unknown. Used as private landing ground pre-war.
Răcăciuni	Bacău	Emergency landing ground; exact location unknown.
Râșnov	Brașov	Landing ground; used to be a pre-war landing ground with no actual confirmed wartime operational use. Measuring approximately 1190 × 730 m. Approximate location 45°34′15.0″N 25°24′30.0″E.
Răstoaca	Vrancea	Landing ground; believed to have functioned as a satellite or dispersal strip for Focșani-South during the Second World War. Exact location unknown.
Reșița	Caraș-Severin	Emergency landing ground; exact location unknown.
Râmnicu Sărat (Sihlele)	Buzău	Operational airfield; rated for all aircraft classes. Existing by 1938 as a private landing ground, it saw military operations in 1941 and again in 1944. Measuring approximately 1100 × 1000 m (unchanged by February 1944), diamond-shaped, with no paved runway. By 1944 the airfield had a medium hangar, workshops, extensive barracks and administrative buildings. Approximate location 45°22′55.0″N 27°04′10.0″E.
Roman	Neamț	Operational airfield; rated for single-engine aircraft. Was used as a pre-war private landing ground, it was used by the Luftwaffe in 1941 as a forward base during the invasion of the Soviet Union. Later inactivated due to poor drainage, it was reopened in spring 1944 after artificial drainage improvements. Measured approximately 500 × 800 m in 1941–43 and about 1000 × 550 m by August 1944, rectangular in shape, with no paved runway. Equipped with a wooden hangar, workshops, administrative buildings, fuel storage and east and west dispersal areas with numerous open aircraft shelters and blast walls. Approximate location 46°56′25.0″N 26°55′30.0″E.
Roșiorii de Vede	Teleorman	Operational Airfield; rated for bombers. Established before the Second World War around 1920 as a landmark airfield on early CFRNA airline routes and a flight training center, it later served both civil and military aviation, including use by the Luftwaffe during the 1941 Balkan campaign and again in spring-summer 1944 for night fighter and bomber operations. Roșiorii de Vede was known locally for training Romanian aviators and hosting flying activities both in peace and wartime. The grass-surfaced airfield had no paved runway; it measured about 1000 × 1000 m in 1941 and was later expanded and reconfigured to roughly 1830 × 455 m by mid-1944. Facilities included a mix of hangars, barracks, workshops and support buildings, and fuel and ammunition were available in several storage sites around the perimeter. After the war the airfield ceased regular aviation operations and was abandoned by the early 1950s. The original site did not return to military or commercial use; limited recreational flying activity resumed in the area only decades later at a separate ultralight strip.
Sălcuța	Dolj	Classified as field airstrip; rated for bombers. In 1941 it measured 900 x 900 meters, but restated in December 1943 as 950 x 1000 meters. Approximate location 44°38′00.0″N 25°34′00.0″E.
Sărulești	Călărași	Emergency landing ground; exact location unknown.
Sebeș	Alba	Landing ground; Ppossibly laid out in 1943–44. Measuring approximately 1100 × 715 m, roughly rectangular in shape, with no paved runway. Approximate location 45°57′40.0″N 23°29′30.0″E.
Sighișoara	Mureș	Emergency landing ground; exact location unknown.
Slatina	Olt	Landing ground; unknown location. Reportedly used by the Luftwaffe for bomber operations during the spring 1941 Balkan campaign, but inactive by 1943–44. Hangars were reportedly under construction in 1941.
Slobozia	Ialomița	Landing ground; exact location unknown.
Stănești	Gorj	Landing ground; measured 1060 x 900 meters in 1941 and had 2 wooden hangars. Approximate location 45°06′00.0″N 23°14′00.0″E.
Șuțești	Brăila	Emergency landing ground; exact location unknown. Measuring approx. 825 x 585 meters
Orăștie	Hunedoara	Emergency landing ground; exact location unknown.
Tadena (Târgu Ocna)	Bacău	Emergency landing ground; exact location unknown. Reportedly had take-off and landing runs of 825 meters.
Țăndărei	Ialomița	Field airstrip; rated for bombers. Measuring approximately 1000 × 700 m (1941 and December 1943 figures), with no paved runway and no permanent infrastructure. Used by several Romanian bomber and long-range reconnaissance units in 1944. Approximate location 44°39′00.0″N 27°40′00.0″E.
Târgoviște	Dâmbovița	Emergency landing ground; exact location unknown.
Târgșorul Nou	Prahova	Operational Airfield; rated for bombers. Pre-war civil airfield, it was frequently used by the Luftwaffe in 1940-41 and again in 1943–44 as a fighter base for the defence of the Ploiești oil refineries against aillied air operations, such as Operation Tidal Wave. No paved runway; measured approximately 1100 × 1100 m (unchanged by January 1944). Equipped with multiple hangars, workshops, barracks and refueling facilities. In October 1943 the airfield was ordered to be fitted with fighter-control equipment for use as a dedicated fighter station. After 1944 the airfield ceased regular aviation operations and was not redeveloped. Its hangars are still up today and can be observed via satellite imagery. Approximate location 44°54′35.0″N 25°52′25.0″E.
Târgu Frumos	Iași	Landing ground; rated for single-engine aircraft. Believed to have been laid out by the Luftwaffe in preparation for the June 1941 invasion of the Soviet Union, although no permanently based German flying units are recorded. Measuring approximately 500 × 700 m (1941 figure), with no permanent infrastructure or hangars documented. Approximate location 47°13′17.0″N 27°00′33.0″E.
Târgu Jiu	Gorj	Landing ground; rated for bombers. A pre-war landing ground, it was used by the Luftwaffe during 1941–42, with no confirmed use thereafter. Measuring approximately 900 × 900 m (1941 and December 1943 figures), unchanged by 1944. Approximate location 45°02′15.0″N 23°16′55.0″E.
Târgu Jiu - Bălănești	Gorj	Landing ground. A small pre-war landing ground. Measuring approximately 915 × 685 m, irregular in shape, with no paved runway. Approximate location 45°03′10.0″N 23°20′00.0″E.
Târgu Jiu - Vădeni	Gorj	Landing ground. Established during the Second World War, though details of its origin and use are limited. Measuring approximately 1370 × 1100 m, rectangular in shape, with no paved runway. Approximate location 45°05′35.0″N 23°15′00.0″E.
Târgu Neamț	Neamț	Emergency landing ground; exact location unknown. Reportedly had take-off and landing runs of 640 meters
Tâtarul	Constanța	Field airstrip; rated for single-engine aircraft. Measuring approximately 1000 × 1250 m in 1941, later restated in December 1943 as 1000 × 700 m. No paved runway or permanent infrastructure is documented. Approximate location 43°52′28.0″N 28°22′07.0″E.
Țepeș Vodă	Constanța	Field airstrip; rated for bombers. Measuring approximately 1100 × 800 m (1941 and December 1943 figures), with no paved runway or permanent infrastructure documented. Approximate location 44°26′44.0″N 28°15′40.0″E.
Teregova	Caraș-Severin	Emergency landing ground; exact location unknown.
Tescani (Gherăești)	Bacău	Emergency landing ground; exact location unknown. Pre-war private landing ground.
Timișoara-Northwest	Timiș	Landing ground; rated for bombers. A pre-war civil and military airport, it was taken over and improved by the Luftwaffe in 1941. Measured approximately 500 × 700 m in 1941 and later enlarged to about 915 × 915 m, diamond-shaped, with no paved runway. Infrastructure included a hangar begun in 1941 and completed by October 1943, along with several small buildings that may have served as administrative or accommodation facilities, including the former terminal building. Currently serving as the place for the Cioca Aerodrome.
Timișoara-Southwest	Timiș	Civil landing ground; rated for individual single-engine aircraft. Measuring approximately 800 × 700 m (December 1943 figure), with no paved runway. Infrastructure consisted of a small terminal building and a barracks with capacity for about 20 men. Occasionally used. Approximate location 45°44′00.0″N 21°17′00.0″E.
Tudora	Botoșani	Field airstrip; rated for all aircraft classes. Built by the Luftwaffe in early 1941 as a forward base for the invasion of the Soviet Union together with the Royal Romanian Air Force although Romanian units weren't identified, it was transferred to the Italian Royal Air Force (Regia Aeronautica) in August 1941, with Italian personnel reportedly present into 1942. Measuring approximately 600 × 1500 m (1941 and December 1943 figures), with no paved runway; landings were not recommended in bad weather due to nearby terrain. Approximate location 47°31′00.0″N 26°38′10.0″E.
Turda I	Turda	Operational airfield (also known as Turda-South); rated for all aircraft classes. Built after Turda-North but never fully developed, it served primarily as a satellite or alternate landing ground for the northern field. Measuring approximately 1300 × 1600 m in 1941–43; Allied aerial photographs from June 1944 indicated dimensions of about 1190 × 1190 m with an irregular layout. No paved runway. Fuel and ammunition facilities were available. By mid-1944 limited infrastructure included one workshop-type building at the northern corner and several prepared but unfinished hangar sites; additional buildings along the northern boundary likely provided accommodation and storage space. Currently, the hangars and adjacent buildings are still up.
Turda II	Turda	Landing ground (also known as Turda-North); rated for single-engine aircraft. Built before the Second World War as a Romanian military airfield. Measuring approximately 600 × 600 m (1941 and June 1944 figures), with no paved runway. Fuel and ammunition facilities were available. Infrastructure included five wooden hangars along the northern boundary, two possibly used as workshops; nearby buildings about 1 km south-west likely served administrative and billeting functions. Approximate location 46°32′40.0″N 23°48′00.0″E.
Turnu Măgurele	Teleorman	Landing ground; originally planned as a secondary civil airport, it was used as a transit field in June 1941 by aircraft flying between Greece and Poland. Measuring approximately 1235 × 960 m, roughly rectangular in shape, with no paved runway. Approximate location 43°45′15.0″N 24°50′30.0″E.
Turnu Severin (Banovița)	Mehedinți	Operational airfield; rated for bombers. Briefly used by the Luftwaffe in spring 1941, then abandoned; reactivated and enlarged in 1943, including the start of runway construction that was never completed. Measuring approximately 900 × 1000 m in 1941 and expanded by mid-August 1944 to about 1325 × 1050 m, irregular in shape. The airfield was bombed on 16 April 1944 by US B-24 bombers, with reported aircraft and infrastructure damage. Approximate location 44°38′00.0″N 22°37′00.0″E.
Ureastra	??	Unknown; possibly a satellite of Pitești and/or Geamăna.
Vălenii de Munte	Prahova	Emergency landing ground; measuring approx. 550 x 185 meters. Approximate location 45°13′00.0″N 26°02′15.0″E.
Vaslui	Vaslui	Landing ground; rated for single-engine aircraft. Believed to have been laid out by the Luftwaffe in preparation for the June 1941 invasion of the Soviet Union. Measuring approximately 600 × 1000 m (1941 figure), with no permanent infrastructure documented. Approximatie location 46°38′00.0″N 27°43′00.0″E.
Vințu de Jos	Alba	Landing ground; existed pre-war. Measuring approximately 730 × 730 m in 1940, with no paved runway. No permanent infrastructure or organized dispersal facilities are documented. Approximate location 46°00′00.0″N 23°32′30.0″E.
Vișina Veche	Olt	Landing ground (historically Vișina Veche; today Vișina Nouă); rated for bombers. Believed to have existed prior to the Second World War. Measuring approximately 900 × 700 m in 1941; Allied aerial photographs from May 1944 indicated dimensions of about 1000 × 915 m, roughly square in shape. No paved runway or permanent infrastructure is documented. Approximate location 43°52′00.0″N 24°25′00.0″E.
Zărnești	Buzău	Field airstrip; exact location not identified. Believed to have been established in late 1943 or early 1944 as a satellite or alternate landing ground for the nearby Ziliștea airfield, and operated under its station command.
Zimnicea	Teleorman	Emergency landing ground; exact location unknown.

The following airfields were located in Bessarabia, now part of Moldova and Ukraine:

Airfield	County	Notes
Bălți I	Bălți	Operational airfield in former Bessarabia; early history not found. Rated for all classes of aircraft at that time. Approximate location 47°48′50.0″N 27°52′05.0″E.
Bălți II	Bălți	Auxiliary airfield. Approximate location 47°43′02.0″N 27°53′29.0″E.
Bălți III	Bălți	Classified as field airstrip; rated for fighters, dive-bombers and other single-engine aircraft. Was considered the most important of the airfields around Bălți during World War II, almost certainly because of the aircraft repair shops and assembly buildings adjacent to the airfield. This airstrip is now known as the Bălți City Airport.
Bălți IV	Bălți	Auxiliary airfield. Approximate location 47°48′00.0″N 27°56′00.0″E.
Bălți V	Bălți	Auxiliary airfield; unknown location.
Bălți VI	Bălți	Auxiliary airfield; unknown location.
Bălți VII	Bălți	Auxiliary airfield; unknown location.
Bălți VIII	Bălți	Operational airfield; unknown location.
Bălți-Strâmba	Bălți	Auxiliary airfield, probably satellite for Bălți I. Approximate location 47°48′00.0″N 27°43′00.0″E.
Cetatea Albă	Cetatea Albă	Operational airfield and seaplane station; Available to all classes but used primarily by fighters. Approximate location 46°09′00.0″N 30°18′00.0″E.
Chișinău I	Chișinău	Operational airfield which was a civil airport before World War II; rated for single-engine aircraft in 1941. Exact location unknown.
Chișinău II	Chișinău	Auxiliary airstrip. Location unknown.
Chișinău III	Chișinău	Classified as field airstrip; measuring approx. 1400 x 1100 meters. Location unknown.
Chișinău IV	Chișinău	Landing ground; Probably satellite site for Chisinău I and III. Location unknown.
Ismail I	Ismail	Operational field airstrip; rated for fighter and transport aircraft, it functioned as a pre-war secondary civil airport and was occasionally used during 1941–44. The landing ground consisted of firm, level grass measuring approximately 500 × 900 m. Approximate location 45°20′00.0″N 28°51′00.0″E.
Ismail II	Ismail	Operational field airstrip; likely operated as a satellite of the nearby Ismail I airstrip during the Second World War. The landing area consisted of a natural grass surface measuring approximately 1200 × 1050 m.
Jebrieni	Chilia	Landing ground; rated for single-engine aircraft. Measured 500 x 500 meters. Approximate location 45°31′00.0″N 29°36′00.0″E.
