= Flyaow =

Airlines of the Web (Flyaow) was the first index of airline sites on the web, and has been online since 1994. Airlines of the Web was created by University of British Columbia associate professor, Marc-David Seidel, while conducting research as a graduate student on the strategic development of the airline industry. It now includes a geographic index of airline websites, aircraft photographs, airport codes, Fractional Jets directory, city guides, and full travel booking functionality through its relationships with well established travel companies.

The website is frequently cited in the news media as a resource for frequent fliers.
