= Air squadron general =

Military rank in the Italian Air Force

Air squadron general is a general officer rank in the Italian Air Force and formerly of the Royal Romanian Air Force.

== Italy ==
Air squadron general Generale di squadra aerea
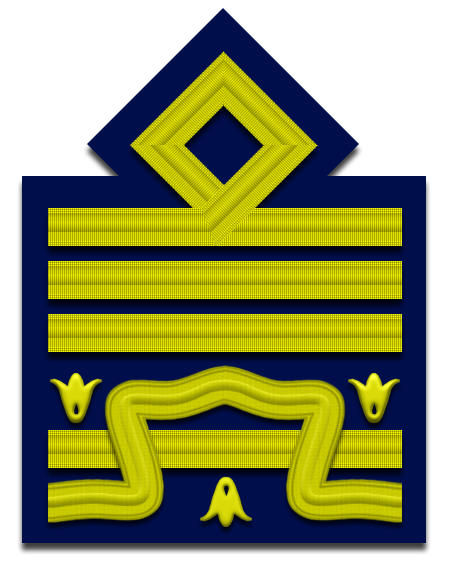
- Rank insignia
- Country: Italy
- Service branch: Italian Air Force
- NATO rank code: OF-8
- Formation: 1923
- Next higher rank: Generale
- Next lower rank: Generale di divisione aerea
- Equivalent ranks: Air marshal (UK); Lieutenant general (USA)

Generale di squadra aerea equivalent to that of air marshal in the Royal Air Force.

== Kingdom of Romania ==
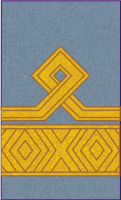
General de escadră aeriană rank insignia, early World War II

General de escadră aeriană was a rank that was used by the Royal Romanian Air Force, until the Abdication of Michael I and creation of the Socialist Republic of Romania. The rank was equivalent to that of Brigadier general. In the modern Romanian Air Force, this rank was replaced by General de flotilă aeriană (Air flotilla general).
