= General Inspectorate of Aviation (Romania) =

- Inspectoratul General de Aviație al Ministerului Afacerilor Interne
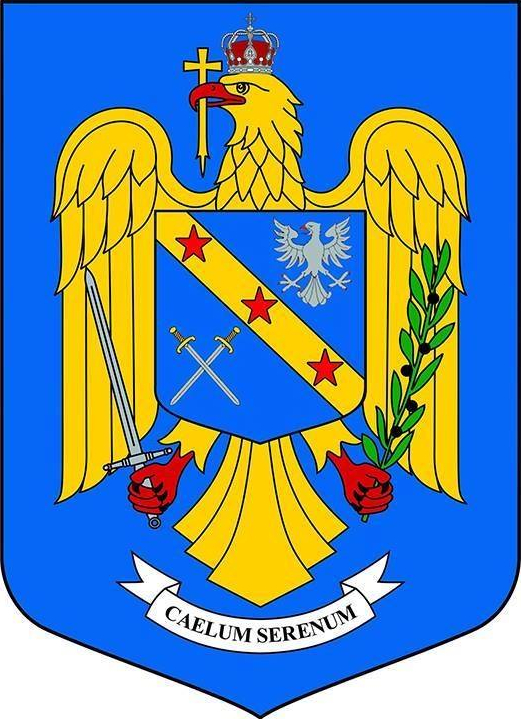
- Coat of arms of the Inspectorate
- Active: 20 December 1948 – present
- Country: Romania
- Part of: Ministry of Internal Affairs
- HQ: Aurel Vlaicu International Airport
- Equipment: EC-135 / S-70M / PA-42 / Cessna Citation V / Learjet 75
- Website: https://aviatie.mai.gov.ro/

Commanders
- General Inspector: General de flotilă aeriană Cătălin-Paul Dache

The General Inspectorate of Aviation (Romanian: Inspectoratul General de Aviație - IGAv) (formerly Special Aviation Unit - Unitatea Specială de Aviație) is the Romanian Ministry of Internal Affairs's air component. The unit was initially established in 1948, but restructured in 1978. It has its overall headquarters at Aurel Vlaicu International Airport and operates five territorial flights in Bucharest, Caransebeș, Cluj-Napoca, Iași and Tulcea. The current General Inspector is General de flotilă aeriană Cătălin-Paul Dache.

== History ==
Following the Second World War, it was decided to form an aviation structure that can serve the civil society. In this sense, the Air Transport Flotilla of the Ministry of Internal Affairs (Flotila Aerotransport a Ministerului Afacerilor Interne) was established on 20 December 1948 at the Dudești-Cioplea airfield. Between 1949 and 1960, the unit functioned under different names: Aviation Regiment, Aviation Transport Group, and Aviation Squadron. It was based on the Popești-Leordeni aerodrome, then it was moved to the Otopeni airport where it remained until 1973, when it was transferred from the Ministry of Internal Affairs to the Ministry of National Defence.

On 1 August 1978, it was reestablished under the Ministry of Internal Affairs under the name of Special Aviation Unit of the Ministry of Internal Affairs (Unitatea Specială de Aviație a Ministerului de Interne). From 1979 on, the unit was located at the Aurel Vlaicu International Airport. Until 2008, the unit functioned under different names: Air Transport Flotilla, Aviation Regiment, Aviation Transport Group, Aviation Squadron, and Special Aviation Unit.

On 1 May 2008, the unit was reorganized, receiving the current name of Aviation Inspectorate and establishing four special aviation units subordinate to it located in Bucharest, Cluj Napoca, Iași, and Tulcea. Starting from 15 May the same year, the unit became operational.

In August 2026, the S-70M RescEU helicopter of IGAv participated in the EU mission to extinguish wildfires at Deliblato Sands in Serbia. This was the first international mission of the Romanian RescEU helicopter.

== Missions ==
- Search and rescue missions.
- Humanitarian and community missions.
- Monitoring road traffic.
- Other special designation missions in cooperation with the Romanian Police, Gendarmerie or Romanian Intelligence Service.

== Structure and equipment ==
Besides the five Special Aviation units (located in Bucharest, Caransebeș, Cluj-Napoca, Iași and Tulcea), the Inspectorate also has a Training and Development Detachment located in Bucharest (Detașamentul de Instruire și Perfecționare București), and an Aeromedical Detachment (Detașamentul Aeromedical).

=== Aeromedical Detachment ===
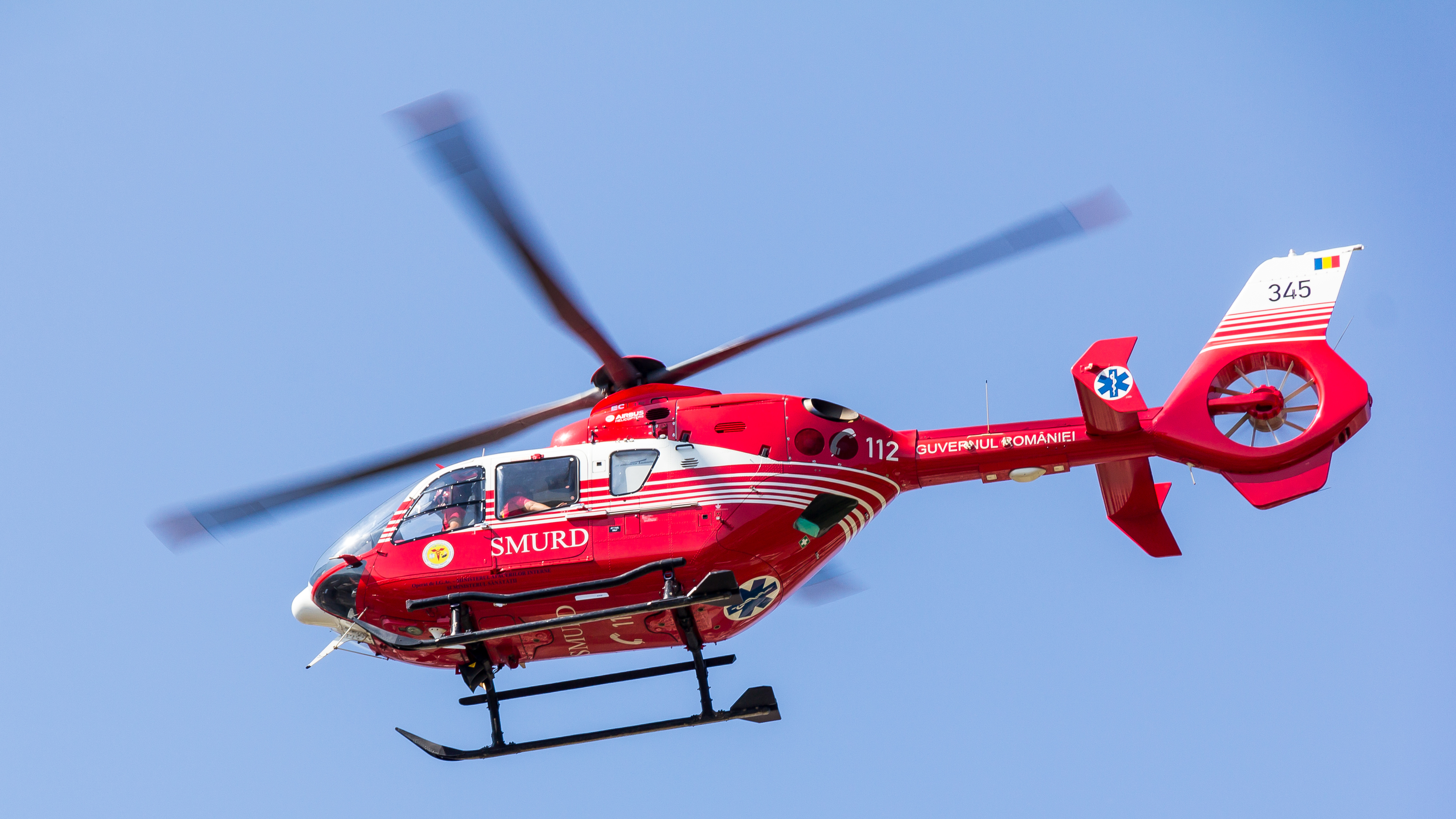
An Airbus Helicopter EC 135 operated by IGAv for SMURD

The Aeromedical Detachment, is a structure subordinated to the General Inspectorate of Aviation tasked with humanitarian life-saving missions. It performs flight missions as the air operator of the SMURD.

The SMURD HEMS (Helicopter Emergency Medical System) bases are led by commanders appointed by the General Inspector of the General Aviation Inspectorate, while the personnel who perform the on-call service for the intervention are designated by the cooperating structures.

=== Equipment ===
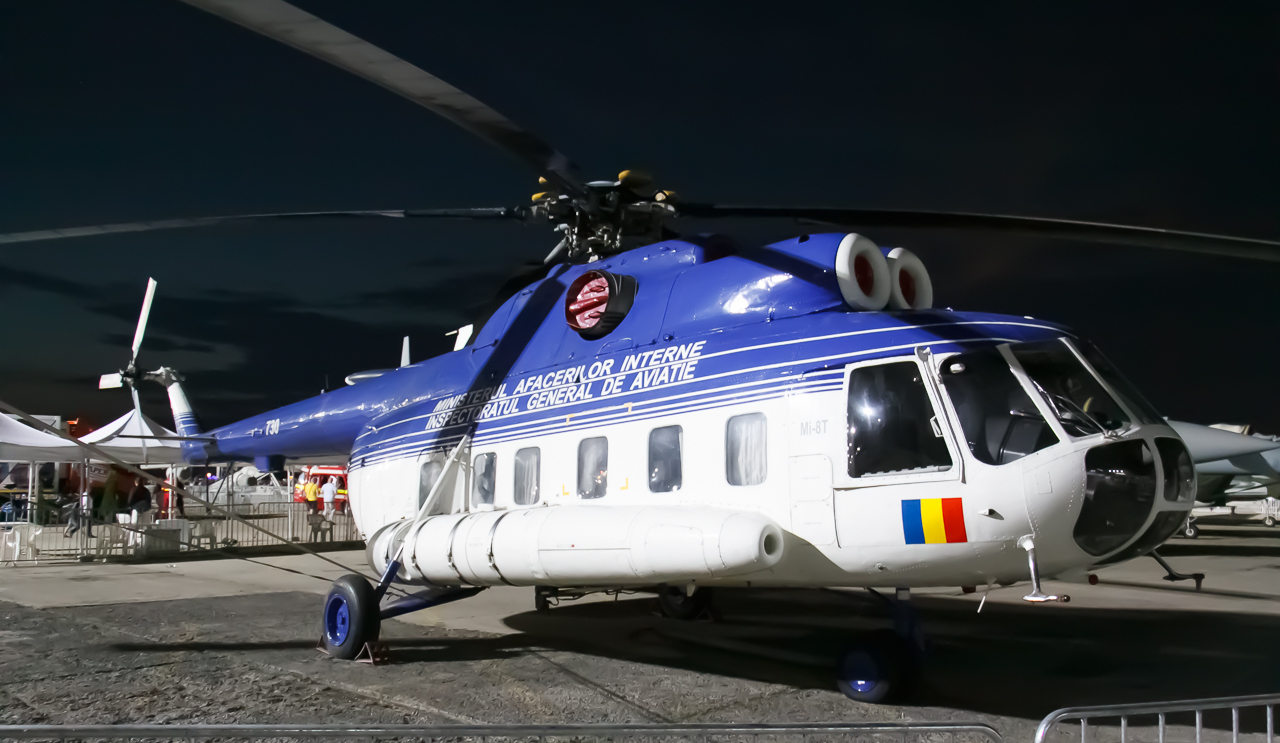
Former Mil Mi-8 of the IGAv at the Bucharest International Air Show 2018

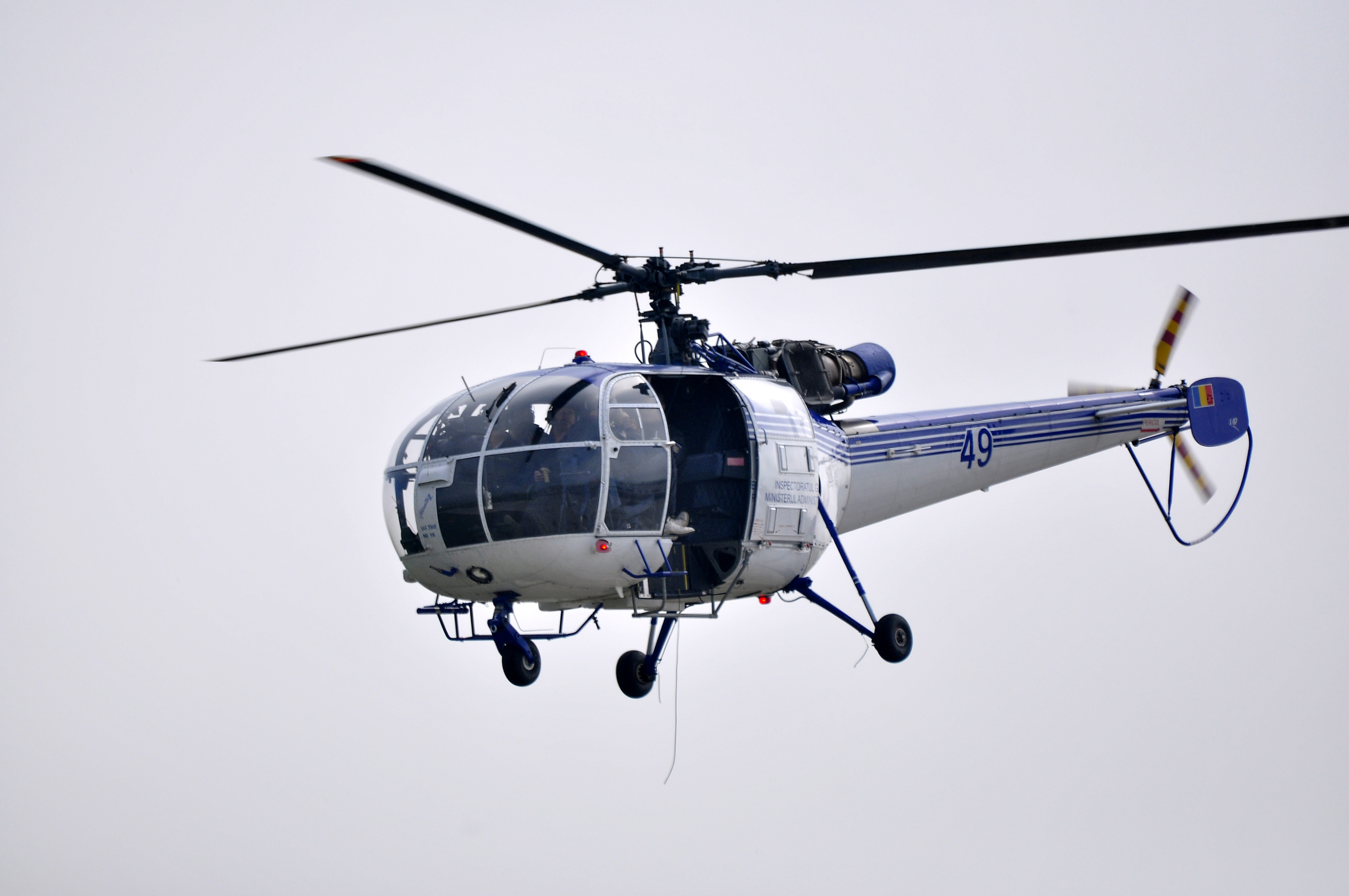
Former IAR 316B operated by IGAv

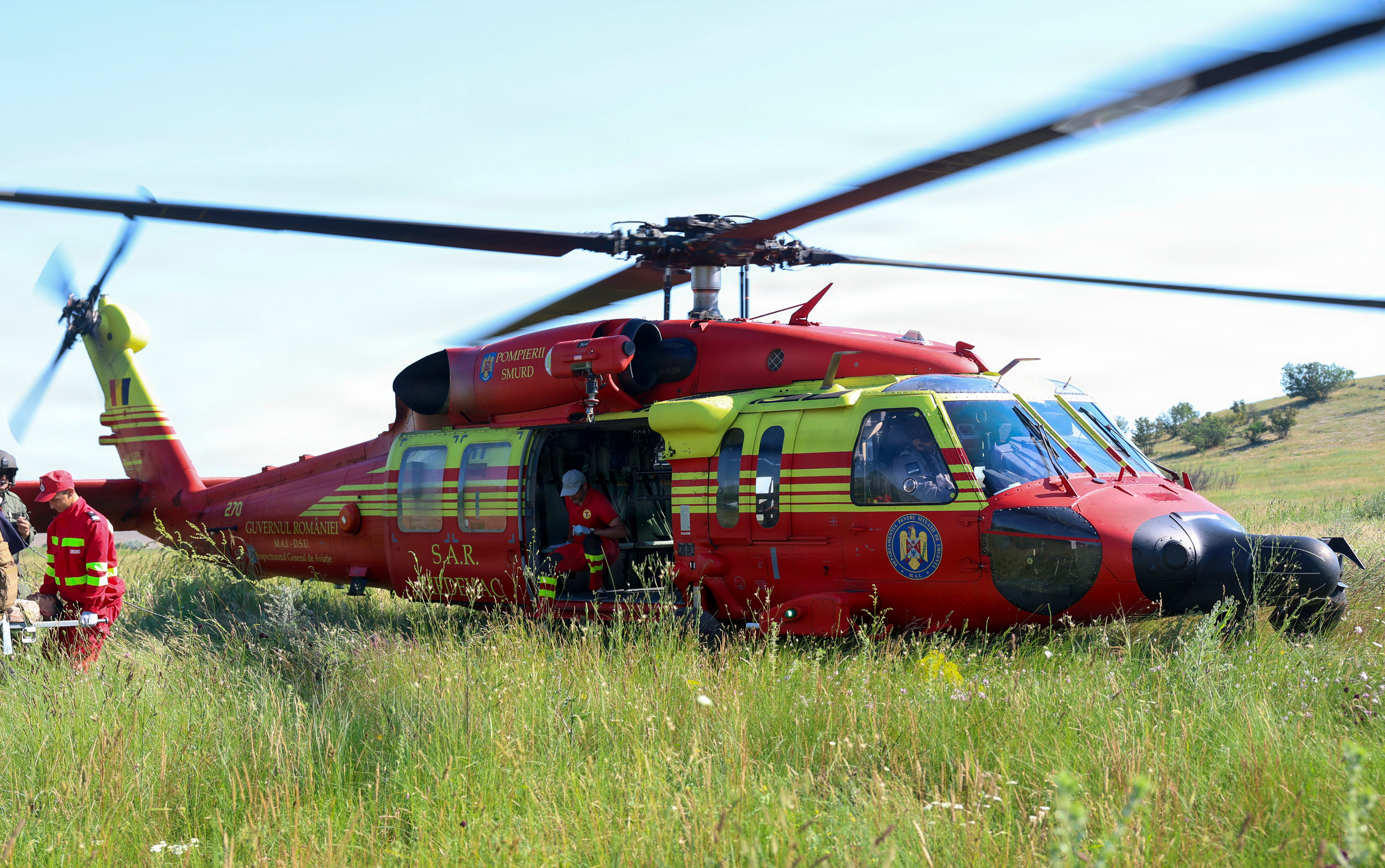
A Sikorsky S-70M operated for SMURD participating in Exercise Sea Breeze 2026

Over the course of its history, the aviation structure operated various types of aircraft: Ju 52, Lockheed 10, Fiesler Storch, Fleet 10, Po-2, Klemm Kl 25, Klemm Kl 35, Heinkel He 111, Bücker Jungmeister, Messerschmitt Bf 108 Taifun, RWD 8, RWD 13, RWD-14, Aero L-60 Brigadýr, Aero 45, Li-2, An-2, and BN-2. Currently, there are 2 types of helicopters and four airplanes in service:

Type	Notes
Helicopters
Eurocopter EC135	21 in service; used by IGAv; also operated for SMURD
Airbus Helicopters H145	5 on order
Airbus Helicopters H160	7 on order
S-70M Black Hawk	8 in service; also operated for SMURD
TOTAL:	29 (12 on order)
Airplanes
Alenia C-27J Spartan	2 on order
Cessna Citation V	One operated for SMURD
Piper PA-42 Cheyenne	One operated for SMURD
Learjet 75	Two operated for SMURD
TOTAL:	4 (2 on order)

In 2021, seven S-70M Black Hawk built by PZL Mielec were purchased. A total of 12 Black Hawks desired. First Black Hawk was delivered in November 2023, with the last being delivered in December. In December 2025, the first Black Hawk funded through the RescEU program was delivered. The helicopter will also be used to intervene during major disasters in other European countries, at the request of the European Union. On 26 January 2026, the Romanian Government presented the list of projects proposed under the Security Action for Europe (SAFE) programme for the Ministry of Internal Affairs (MAI) and the other institutions. According to the published proposal, MAI planned the acquisition of seven medium-heavy multirole helicopters, and two multi-role aircraft. On 29 May 2026, MAI officially announced the purchase of five Airbus H145 and seven Airbus H160 helicopters, as well as two Alenia C-27J New Generation Spartan through the SAFE funding.

Initially planned to be retired in 2029, the Mil Mi-8 and Mi-17 helicopters were retired earlier from service in 2022, following the Russian invasion of Ukraine and the subsequent international sanctions imposed on Russia. In addition, the two IAR 316B helicopters were also withdrawn from service in 2023 and 2024 respectively.
