= IAR 330 =

Romanian military transport helicopter

IAR 330 Puma
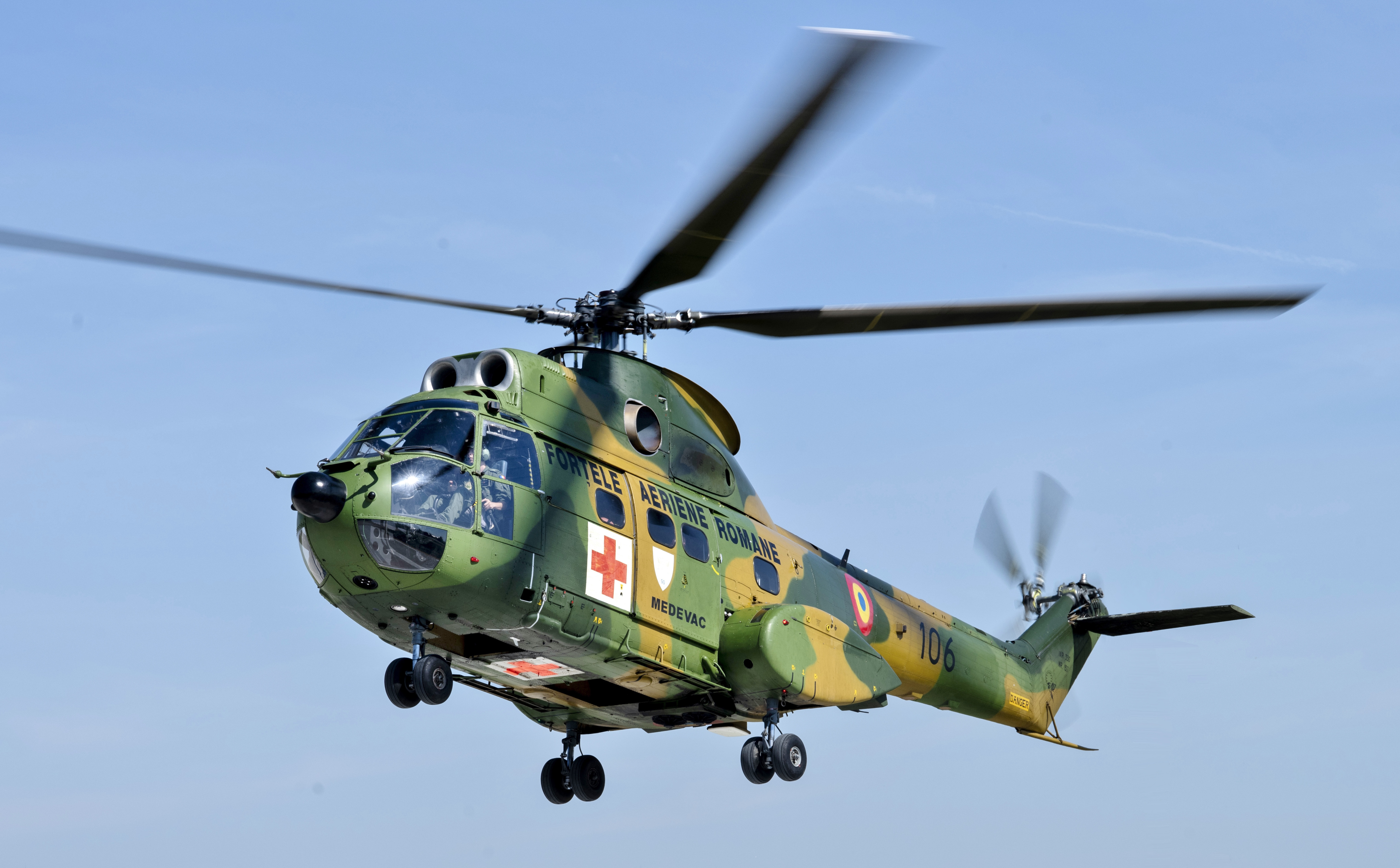
- A Romanian Air Force IAR 330 Puma performs Medical evacuation duty

General information
- Type: Utility helicopter/gunship/naval helicopter
- Manufacturer: Industria Aeronautică Română
- Status: In service
- Primary users: Romanian Air Force Romanian Navy; United Arab Emirates Air Force; Sudan Air Force; Lebanese Air Force
- Number built: ≥ 163

History
- Manufactured: 1975–2008
- First flight: 22 October 1975
- Developed from: Aérospatiale SA 330 Puma

The IAR 330 is a licence-built version of the Aérospatiale SA 330 Puma helicopter, manufactured by the Romanian aerospace manufacturer Industria Aeronautică Română.

The IAR 330 was produced under a licensing agreement with the French aerospace firm Aérospatiale, signed on 30 July 1974. On 22 October 1975, the first Romanian-built Puma conducted its maiden flight. Deliveries to customers begun shortly thereafter; by 1980, around 25 IAR 330s had been produced for both domestic and overseas customers. Various oversea countries opted to procure the IAR 330, including Pakistan, Ivory Coast, United Arab Emirates, and Sudan. The largest operator of the type would be the Romanian Air Force, who initially used it primarily as a utility transport.

During the 1990s, there was a desire for a rotary anti-tank capability, as well as to integrate Romania's defense equipment with NATO. Accordingly, during the 2000s, IAR collaborated with the Israeli defense company Elbit Systems to produce twenty-four IAR 330 SOCAT helicopters, which was designed for anti-tank and battlefield support operations. A modernized utility transport model equipped NATO-compatible avionics derived from the SOCAT, referred to as the IAR 330M, was also produced around this time. A navalised model, capable of search and rescue, medevac, and maritime surveillance, was also developed. The final IAR 330 was produced in 2008; the programme has effectively been replaced by the Airbus Helicopters H215 Super Puma, the production of which was transferred to Brașov under Eurocopter Romania, a joint venture between Airbus Helicopters and IAR.

== Design and development ==
=== Background ===
Throughout most of the Cold War, Romania was a member of both COMECON and the Warsaw Pact. Despite this, the Ceaușescu government sought to avoid becoming overly dependent on support from the Soviet Union and maintain independence. Accordingly, for military equipment to be developed entirely or partially in Romania to bolster the nation's self-reliance was desirable, while partnerships with third party countries were also sought for the supply of large-ticket items. During the early 1970s, the Romanian government invited multiple companies, including the French aerospace firm Aérospatiale and the American helicopter manufacturer Sikorsky Aircraft, to demonstrate their helicopters, which held the intention of acquiring a license to produce its preferred rotorcraft.

Accordingly, on 11 October 1973, the Sikorsky S-61 was formally pitched to a group of Romanian representatives, which included a test flight performed at Băneasa Airport. Between 13 and 15 October of that same month, a presentation at the Romanian aerospace manufacturer Întreprinderea de Construcții Aeronautice's (IAR) facility at Ghimbav. The Puma was demonstrated on 20 October. On 30 July 1974, it was announced that Romania had signed a licensing agreement covering the local production of the Puma by IAR. A separate agreement was also signed to undertake the licensed production of the Turboméca Turmo IVC turboshaft engines that powered the type.

=== Initial production ===
On 22 October 1975, the first Romanian-built Puma, which was locally designation IAR 330H, performed its maiden flight. Quantity production of the type proceeded shortly thereafter; by 1980, around 25 IAR 330s had reportedly been produced, with the deliveries evenly divided between domestic and overseas customers. By 2010, around 163 of these helicopters have reportedly been built, 104 of which were delivered to the air wings of the Romanian military, while two were retained by the manufacturer and a further 57 were produced for various export operators. Oversea countries that procured the IAR 330 include Pakistan, Ivory Coast, United Arab Emirates, and Sudan.

By the end of the Cold War, the IAR 330 was well established as the principal rotorcraft of Romania. Furthermore, specialised variants of the helicopter were developed for roles such as naval warfare, search and rescue (SAR), command & control, and medevac operations, typically being produced in limited numbers. The SAR model was outfitted with inflatable floats for emergency landing at sea. Production of the IAR 330 continued into the 21st century, performed by the Industria Aeronautică Română (presently known as IAR S.A. Brașov) at their plant outside Brașov. In 2008, the final Romanian-built helicopter was reportedly manufactured, the company was privatised that same year. In November 2015, Airbus Helicopters announced that all final assembly of the Airbus Helicopters H215 Super Puma, the successor to the original Puma, would be transferred to a final assembly line in Brașov under Eurocopter Romania, a joint venture between Airbus Helicopters and IAR; as such, this initiative effectively took the place of the IAR 330 programme.

== Operational history ==
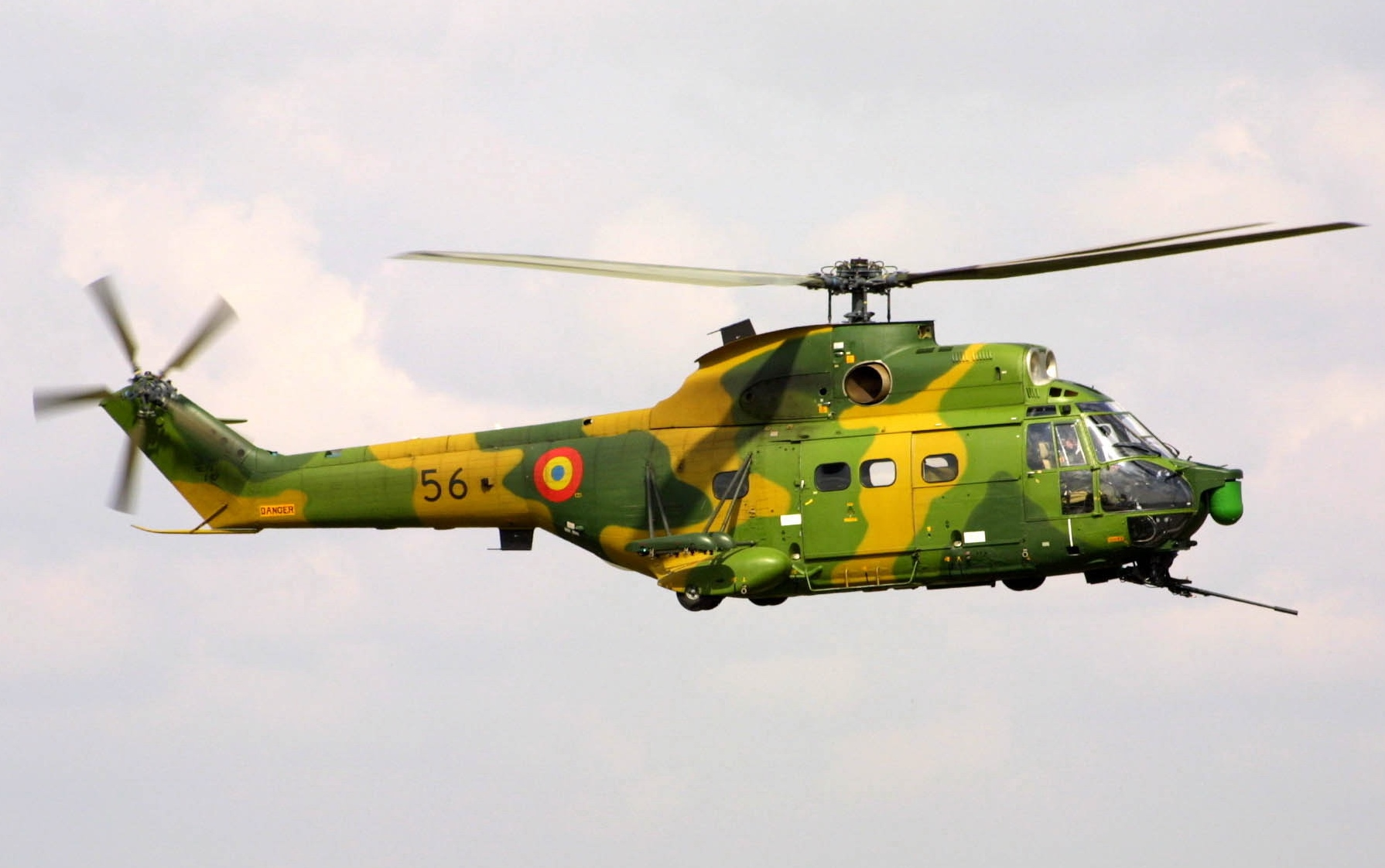
The IAR-330 Puma SOCAT used for anti-armor warfare

During the 1990s, the Romanian Air Force sought to enhance the combat capabilities of its IAR 330L fleet to make it into a universal anti-tank and support helicopter. By this time, Romania started to cooperate with Israel on several different military programs. The Israeli company Elbit Systems was chosen and, in September 1995, the Romanian Air Force signed a contract with the company to upgrade 24 helicopters with the SOCAT system (Sistem Optronic de Cercetare și Anti-Tanc). On 26 May 1998, the first IAR 330L SOCAT was flown from IAR's airfield in Ghimbav, near Brașov. On 23 October 1999, the second prototype made its first flight. During 2001, the first IAR 330L SOCAT was delivered to a combat unit. In all, 25 SOCATs were produced, including the prototypes, which were rebuilt to production standard in 2005.

The IAR 330M NATO is a modernized transport version with the SOCAT version's avionics, but without either the weapons and optronic systems. Among other features, it has a weather radar. Between 2005 and 2008, twelve IAR 330Ls were modernized to the IAR 330M standard. By the early 2020s, several of the IAR 330 SOCATs were approaching their original operational limits, thus the Romanian Air Force begun contracting IAR to replace life-expired elements and thus facilitate the type's continued service.

On 30 January 2007, the first IAR 330 NAVAL helicopter was officially unveiled at Ghimbav. The Romanian Naval Forces ordered three of this variant. The helicopter is in a similar configuration to the Romanian Air Force variant, including the SOCAT upgrade package; however, the Navy rotorcraft are equipped with RDR-1700A on-board radar, flotation gear housed underneath the nose and main undercarriage fairings and can carry Sting Ray torpedoes. Much of the mission-specific avionics are supplied by the French defense company Thales Group. They are typically operated from the Navy's frigates and undertake missions such as search and rescue, medevac, maritime surveillance missions and anti-submarine warfare missions.

== Variants ==
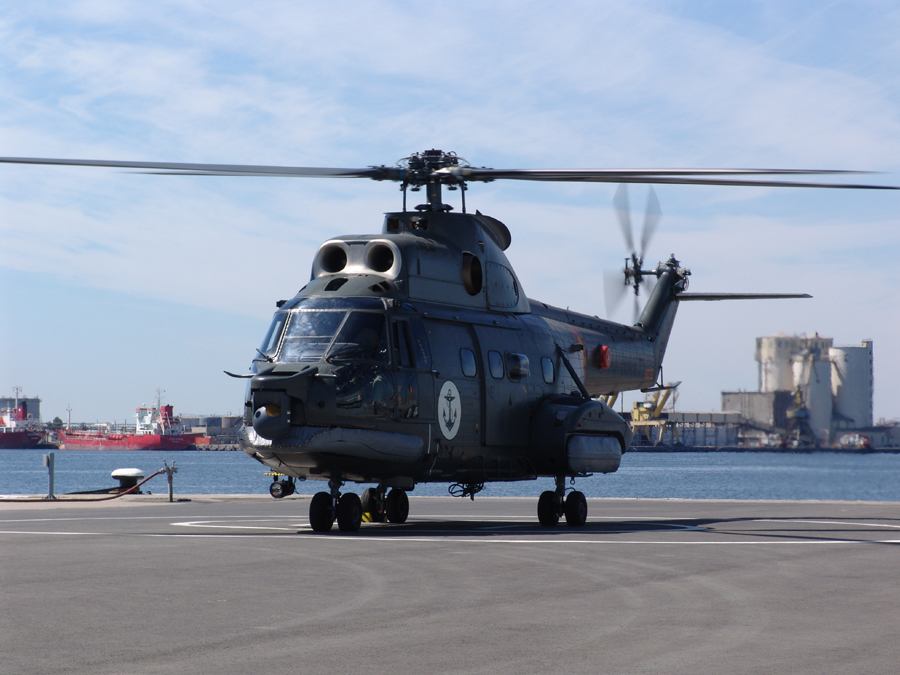
IAR 330 Puma NAVAL variant.

- IAR 330H – initial model (1975–1977). 15 built.
- IAR 330L – improved model (1977–2008). Out of the 165 built, 112 went into service with the Romanian armed forces.
- IAR 330M – modernized variant with NATO-compatible avionics derived from the SOCAT model, 12 IAR 330Ls rebuilt as such between 2005 and 2008.
- IAR 330L SOCAT – attack helicopter, total of 25 produced during the early to mid 2000s.
- IAR 330 NAVAL – naval helicopter. 3 built between 2005 and 2008, with further trials and upgrades up to 2015.
- IAR 330 SM – equipped with Turbomeca Makila 1A1 engines (export configuration for the United Arab Emirates).

== Operators ==
Map of current and former IAR 330 operators.

Democratic Republic of the Congo

- Air Force of the DRC – 1, delivered in 1971

Ivory Coast

- Ivory Coast Air Force – 4, delivered in 2003, 2 of which are for VIP transport

Kenya

- Kenya Air Force – 9–16, delivered between 1978 and 1984

Lebanon

- Lebanese Air Force – 6, delivered in 1984

Pakistan

- Pakistan Army – 4, delivered in 1984

Romania

- Romanian Air Force – 56
- Romanian Navy – 3

Sudan

- Sudanese Air Force - 15, delivered between 1984 and 1985

United Arab Emirates

- United Arab Emirates Air Force - 20. An initial 10 IAR-330L were delivered between 1993 and 1994, a further 10 IAR-330SM were supplied between 2006 and 2007. At least 7 SMs were transferred to the Lebanese Air Force between 2009 and 2011.

== Notable incidents ==
- On 23 December 1989, an IAR 330 crash landed after having been presumably shot at during a transport flight near Alba Iulia, killing the crew of three and two passengers.
- On 16 August 2001, an IAR 330 SOCAT crashed during a training flight shortly after take-off from Titu Air Base. The crash occurred at an altitude of 50 metres (165 ft.), wounding the crew.
- On 7 November 2007, an IAR 330 SOCAT, belonging to the 90th Airlift Base, crashed in Ungheni, 30 km south of Pitești, during a night training mission, killing all three crew members.
- On 7 March 2013, an IAR 330 SOCAT crashed in Berești-Bistrița, near Bacău, during a training flight, killing two crew members and wounding three other crew members. The Romanian Air Force and Navy grounded the entire IAR 330 SOCAT fleet pending an investigation into the crash.
- On 21 November 2014, an IAR-330 MEDEVAC crashed in Mălâncrav, near Sibiu, during a training flight, killing eight military personnel and injuring two others.
- On 22 March 2022, an IAR 330 crashed near the village of Gura Dobrogei, Cogealac Commune, amid adverse weather conditions while searching for a crashed MiG-21 Lancer in the area, killing seven military personnel.

== Specifications (IAR-330L) ==
Orthographically projected diagram of the SA330 Puma Line Drawing

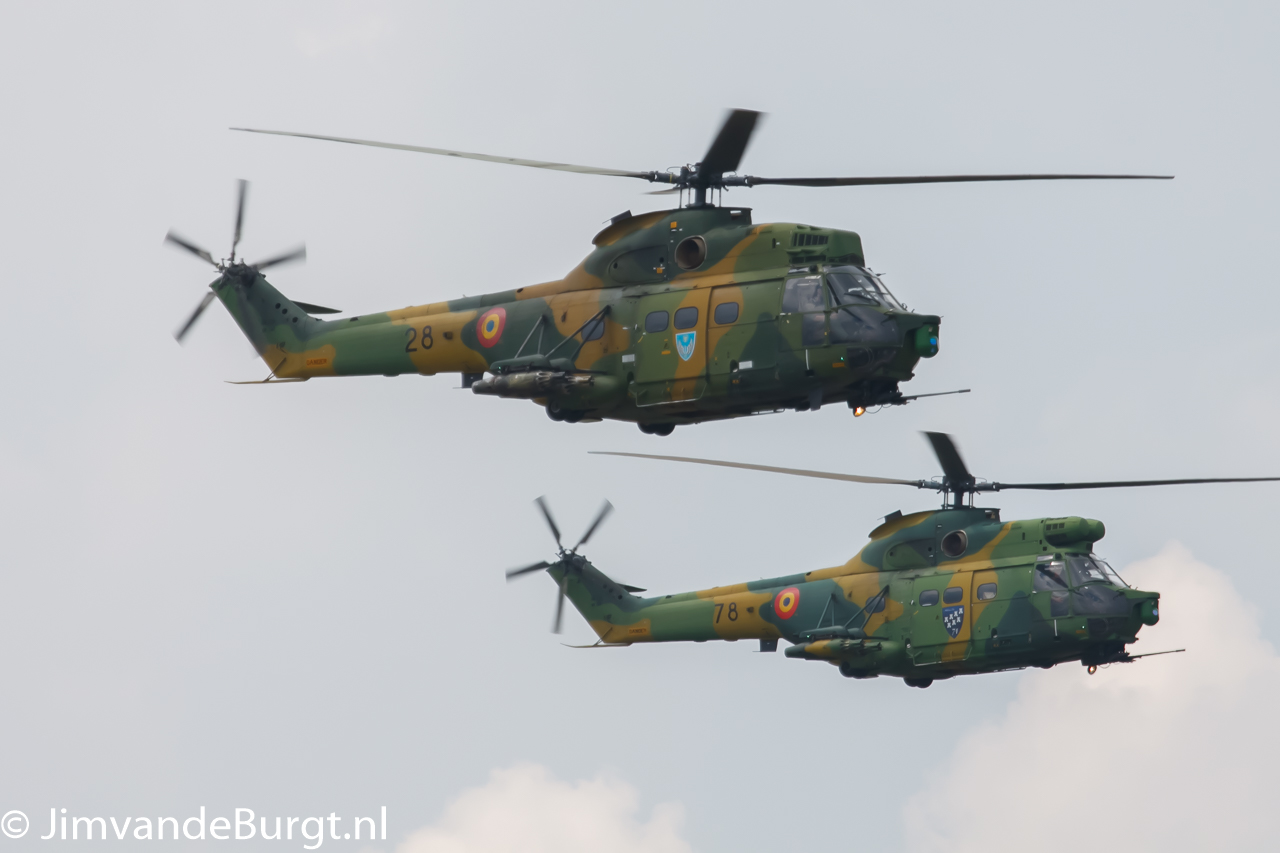
Pair of IAR 330s in flight

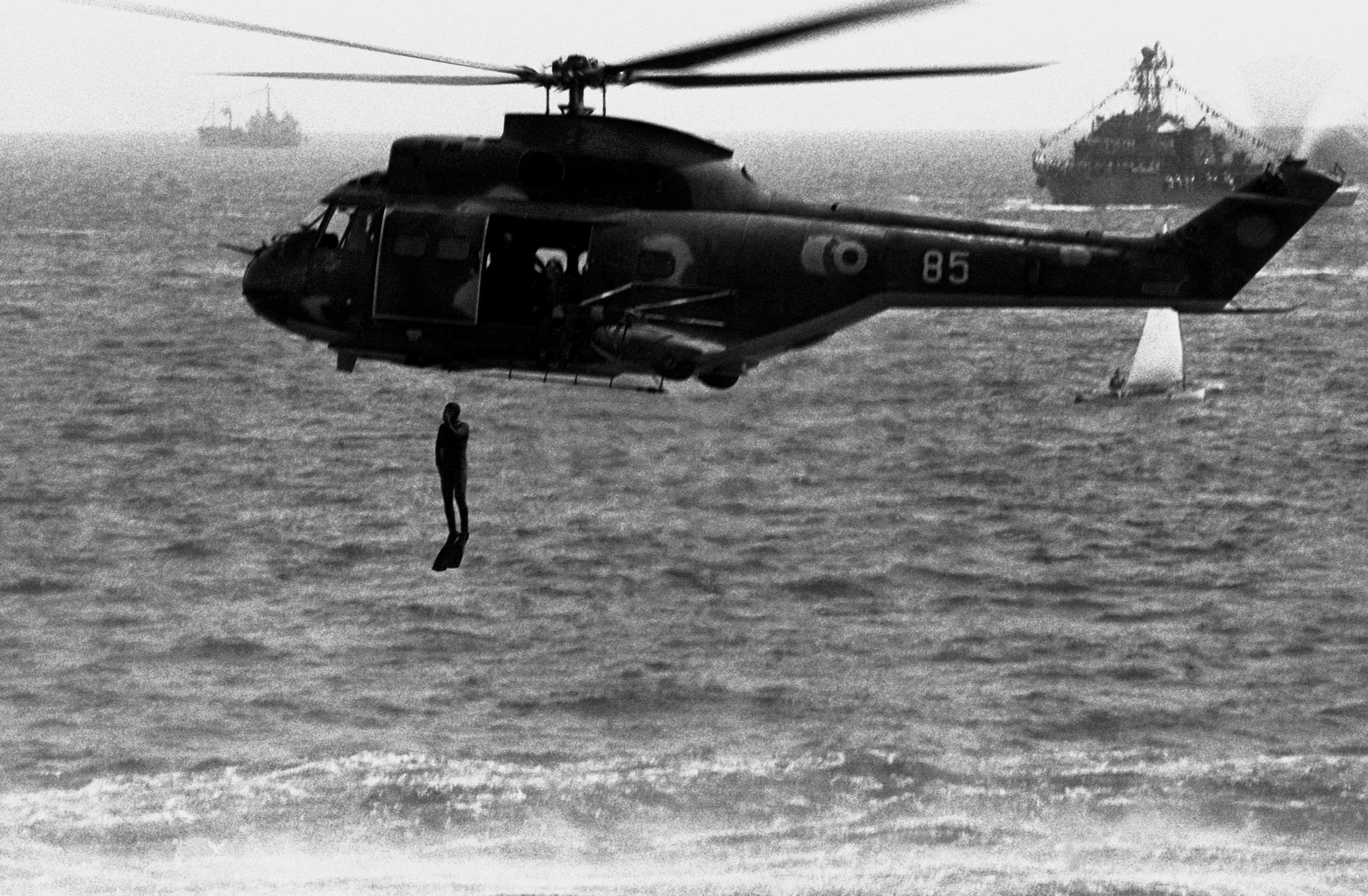
Diver dropping toward the water from an IAR-330L Puma, 1992

Data from Jane's All The World's Aircraft 1992–1993

General characteristics

- Crew: 1–3
- Capacity: 16 fully equipped troops
- Length: 18.15 m (59 ft 7 in) (overall), 14.06 m (46 ft 2 in)
- Height: 5.14 m (16 ft 10 in)
- Empty weight: 3,615 kg (7,970 lb)
- Max takeoff weight: 7,400 kg (16,314 lb)
- Powerplant: 2 × Turboméca Turmo IVC turboshaft engines, 1,175 kW (1,576 hp) each
- Main rotor diameter: 15.00 m (49 ft 3 in)
- Main rotor area: 176.7 m^{2} (1,902 sq ft)

Performance

- Cruise speed: 271 km/h (168 mph, 146 kn) (max cruise)
- Never exceed speed: 294 km/h (183 mph, 159 kn)
- Range: 572 km (355 mi, 309 nmi)
- Service ceiling: 6,000 m (20,000 ft)
- Rate of climb: 9.2 m/s (1,810 ft/min)

Armament

- 2 x 23 mm single barrel NR-23 gun pods (on the sides of the nose) with 400 rounds each (optional)
- LPR 57 unguided rocket launcher (optional, on four hardpoints)
- 2 x 7.62 mm calibre door mounted machine guns (usually only one mounted on the starboard side)
- Malyutka wire guided ATGM (four rails above the hardpoints, used only on trials)
- 50 or 100 kg bombs (four hardpoints, used only on trials)

Puma SOCAT

- Nexter THL-20 20mm automatic cannon (chin mounted) with 750 rounds
- LPR 57 unguided rocket launcher (inner two hardpoints)
- 8 RAFAEL Spike-ER anti-tank guided missiles (outer two hardpoints only)
- Nexter NC-621 20 mm gun pod with 180 rounds (outer two hardpoints, used only on trials)

Puma Naval

- 2 x Sting Ray lightweight torpedoes
- 1 x 7.62 mm calibre door mounted Dillon rotary machine gun

== Family tree ==
  - SA330 Puma – (France)
    - Atlas Oryx – (South Africa)
      - Denel Rooivalk – (South Africa)
    - IAR 330 – (Romania)
    - IPTN NAS 330J (Indonesia)
    - Westland Puma HC.1 (United Kingdom)
  - Eurocopter AS332 Super Puma – (France) (H215 Super Puma)
    - Eurocopter AS532 Cougar – (France) (H215M Caracal)
    - KAI KUH-1 Surion – (South Korea)
  - Eurocopter EC725 – (France) (H225M Caracal)
    - Eurocopter EC225 Super Puma – (France) (EC225 Super Puma Mk2)

== See also ==
Related development

- Aérospatiale SA 330 Puma
- Atlas Oryx

Aircraft of comparable role, configuration, and era

- Eurocopter AS532 Cougar
- Eurocopter AS332 Super Puma

Related lists

- List of rotorcraft
