= RoAF 90th Airlift Base =

Airlift base of the Romanian Air Force

RoAF 90th Airlift Base
- Baza 90 Transport Aerian "Comandor Aviator Gheorghe Bănciulescu"
- Otopeni, Ilfov County; Near Bucharest in Romania
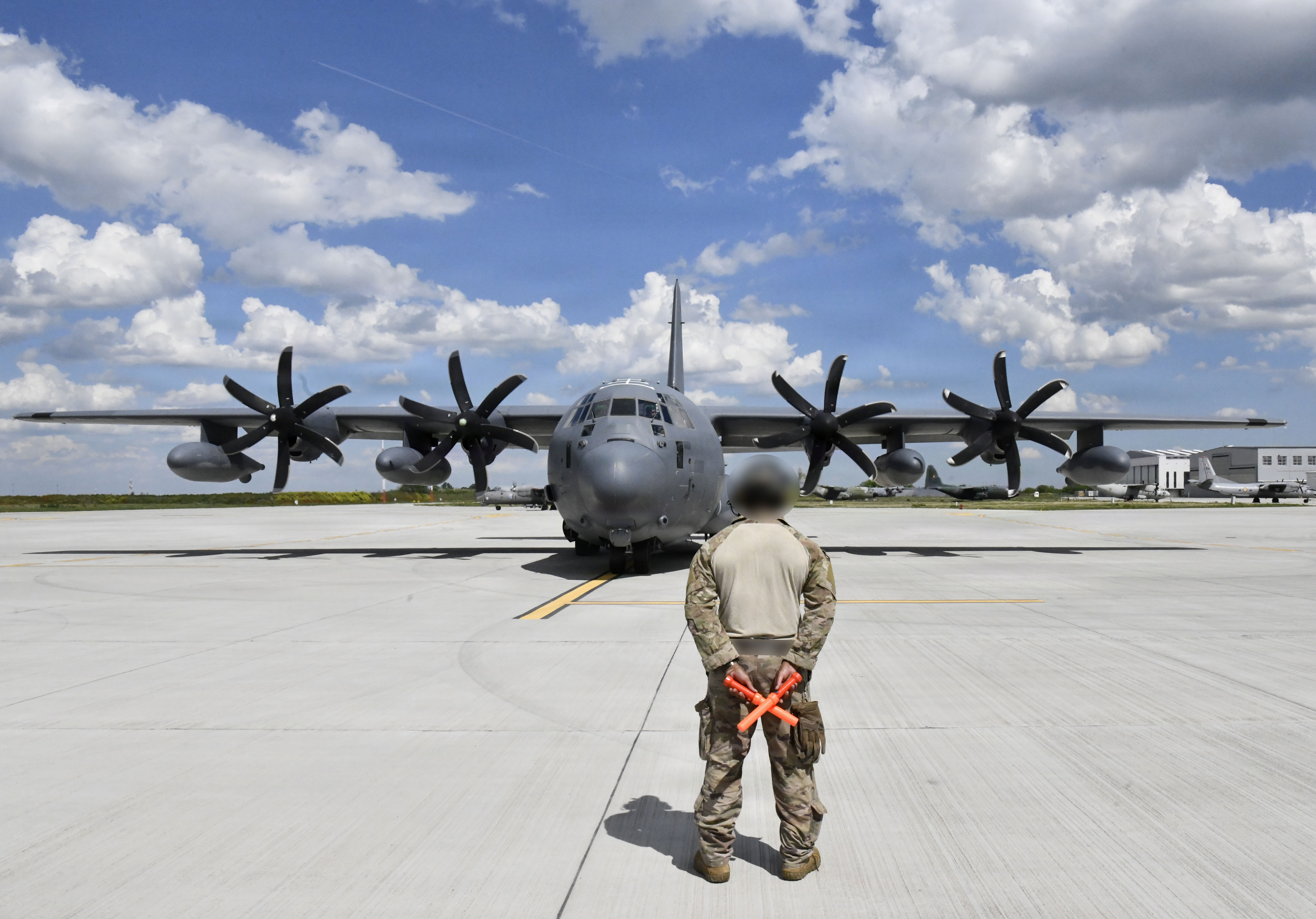
- An MC-130J and various other transport aircraft at the 90th Airlift Base in 2026

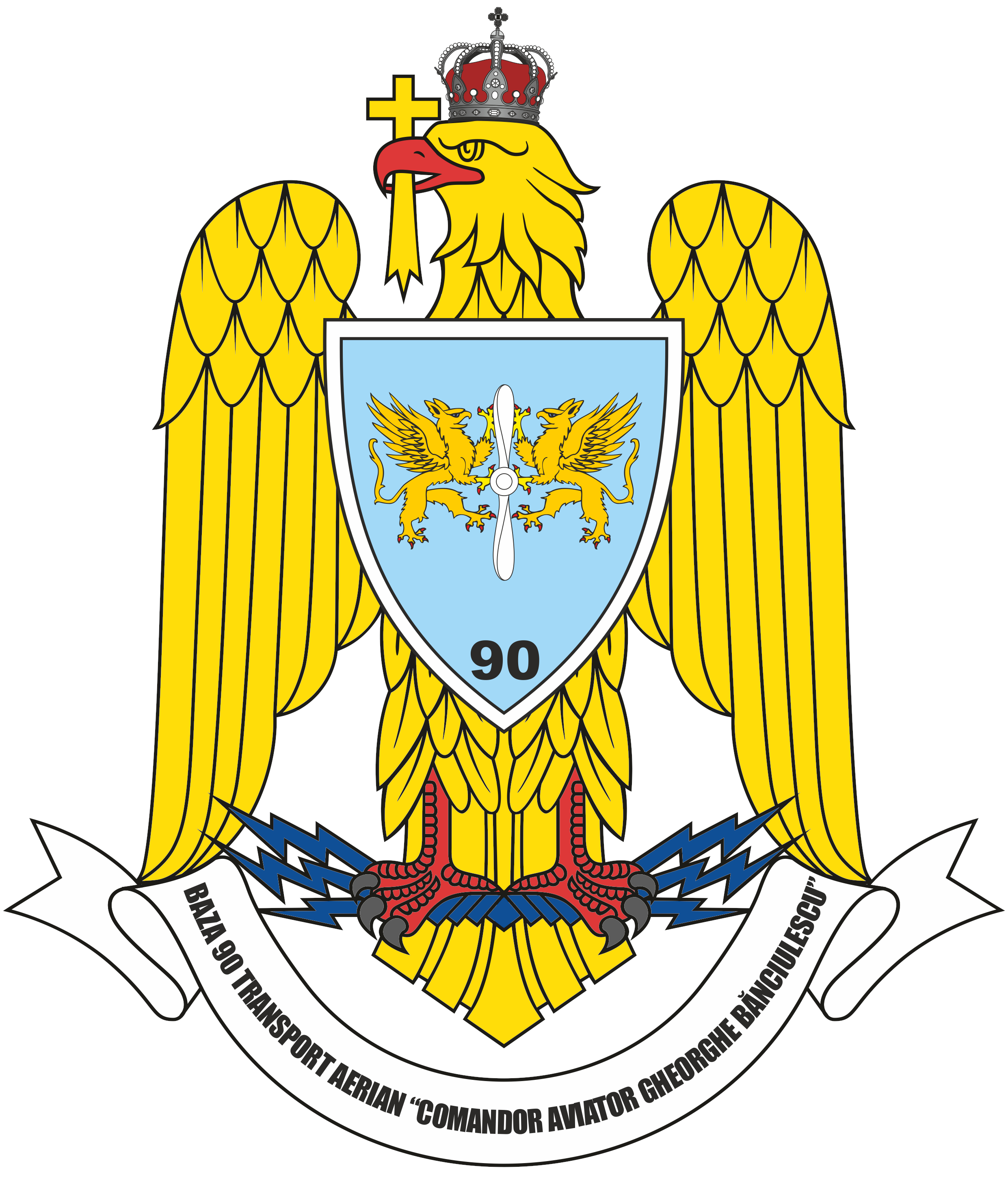
- Coat of arms of the 90th Airlift Base

Site information
- Owner: Ministry of National Defence
- Operator: Romanian Air Force

Location
- Location within Romania Location within Europe
- Coordinates: 44°33′42″N 026°05′21″E

Site history
- Built: c. 1940
- In use: 1944-Present

Garrison information
- Current commander: General de flotilă aeriană Ion Emil-Florian Tecuceanu
- Occupants: 901st Air Transport Squadron; 902nd Air Transport Squadron; 903rd Transport Helicopter Squadron

Airfield information
- Identifiers: IATA: OTP, ICAO: LROP
- Elevation: 96 metres (315 ft) AMSL
Runways
Direction	Length and surface
08R/26L	3,500 metres (11,483 ft) Asphalt

The Romanian Air Force 90th Airlift Base "Comandor Aviator Gheorghe Bănciulescu" (Romanian: Baza 90 Transport Aerian), also known as Otopeni Air Base, is located at the Henri Coandă International Airport, near Bucharest. The base is currently home to the 901st and 902nd Air Transport squadrons, operating Lockheed C-130 Hercules, Alenia C-27J Spartan, Antonov An-26 and Antonov An-30 aircraft, as well as the 903rd Transport Helicopter Squadron, operating the IAR 330L and IAR 330M. The 90th Airlift Base was also the home of the Presidential and Government aircraft.

In October 2004, the 71st Helicopter Squadron was transferred to the 90th Airlift Base, adding IAR-330 SOCAT to its inventory. The 90th Airlift Base has also MEDEVAC capability.

The current commander of the base is General de flotilă aeriană Ion Emil-Florian Tecuceanu.

== History ==
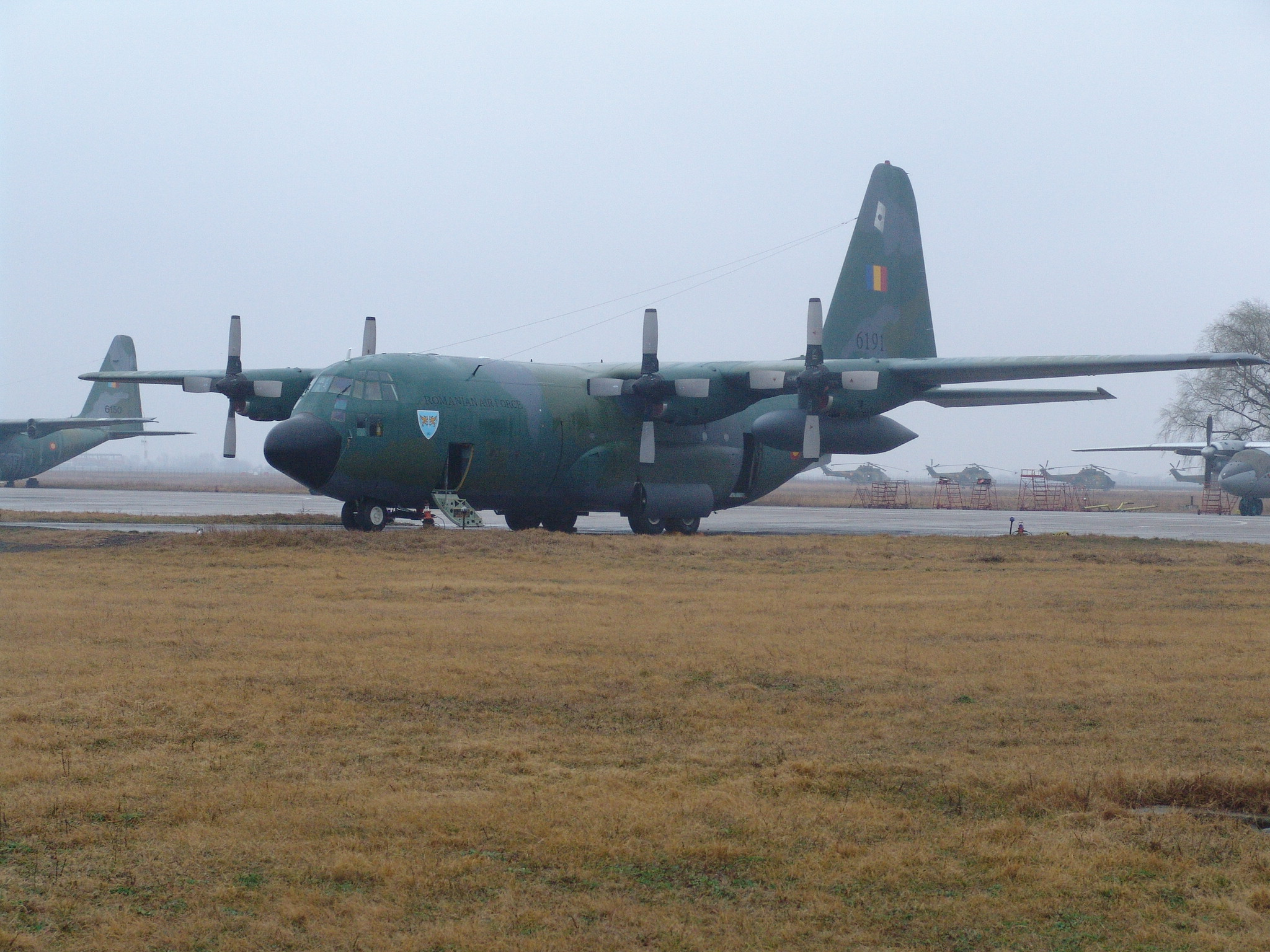
C-130H stationed at the 90th Airlift Base in 2007

The Otopeni military airport was built around 1940 and initially intended as a military training center. It was extensively used by the Luftwaffe in 1941 with units of the Sturzkampfgeschwader 2 and Jagdgeschwader 77 located there. The Romanian Grupul 6 Vânătoare also used the airport between June and August 1941. The base was further expanded in 1943, being outfitted with fighter control equipment. From July 1943 until 1944, it functioned as the headquarters of Jagdfliegerführer Rumänien commanding the day and night fighters which were defending Romania from Allied air raids. At the same time, night fighter units such as Nachtjagdgeschwader 6 and Nachtjagdgeschwader 100 also began to be based there. After Romania turned against Nazi Germany in 1944, Otopeni began to be used by the Romanian military.

In 1949, the 8th Transport Aviation Regiment (Regimentul 8 Aviație Transport) was established on the "Romeo Popescu" aerodrome at Giulești. The regiment was transferred to the Otopeni airport, where in 1951 it changed its name to the 108th Aviation Transport Regiment. With this occasion, the battle flag of the regiment was decorated with Ordinul Apărarea patriei.

In 1959, the Regiment was transformed in the 99th Transport Aviation Regiment. From 1986 to 1988, the 99th Transport Aviation Regiment was part of the 50th Transport Aviation Flotilla (Flotila 50 Aviație Transport), a unit formed in 1972, and from 1988 to 1990 it acted as an independent structure named the 99th Transport Aviation Group (Grupul 99 Aviație Transport).

In 1990, the 90th Air Transport Base was formed by merging the 50th Transport Aviation Flotilla and the 99th Aviation Transport Group. The Base received the battle flag and the title of "Comandor Aviator Gheorghe Bănciulescu" in 1995. The first C-130 airplanes entered service in 1996, followed by the C-27J in 2010. In 2019, during the 70-year anniversary of the base, its battle flag was decorated with the Order of Aeronautical Virtue by President Klaus Iohannis.

The C-130s of the 90th Airlift Base participated in the 2021 Kabul airlift, evacuating Romanian and Bulgarian citizens from Afghanistan.

=== 2007 IAR-330 SOCAT crash ===
Three crewmen were killed on 7 November 2007, including Comandor Nicolae Bucur (one of the most experienced RoAF pilots, with over 2,700 flying hours), when an IAR-330 Puma SOCAT helicopter belonging to the 90th Airlift Base crashed in Ungheni, near Pitești, Argeș County. The aircraft was performing a night training mission when it disappeared from radar. Immediately after the crash, the 90th air base detached two helicopters for a search and rescue mission.

== Foreign deployments ==
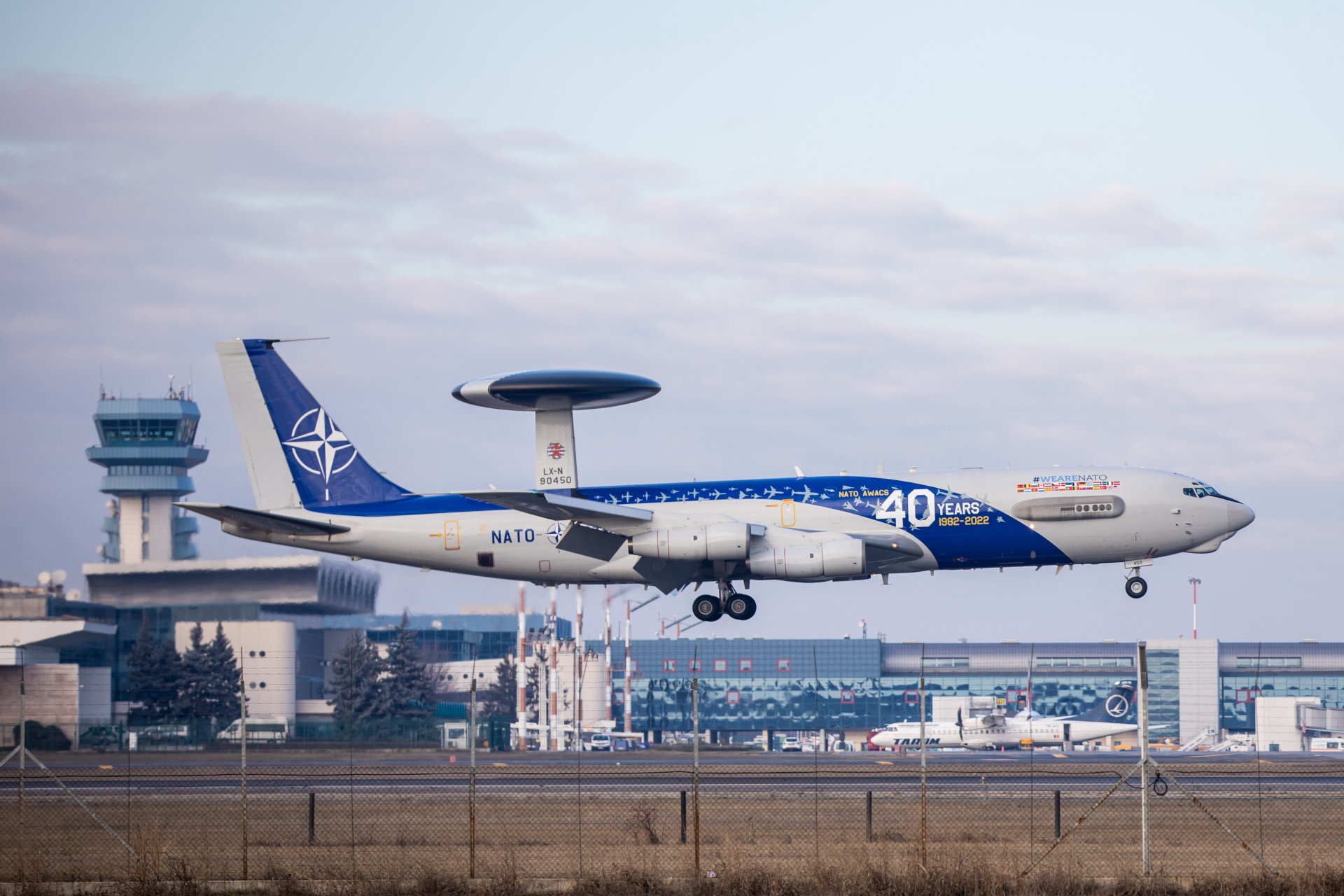
A NATO E-3 Sentry landing at the base

=== 2023 NATO AWACS deployment ===
It was announced on 12 January 2023 that three NATO AWACS planes were to be deployed from NATO Air Base Geilenkirchen. The planes are to conduct missions for several weeks, monitoring Russian military activity in response to the 2022 Russian invasion of Ukraine.

The first Boeing E-3 Sentry airplanes arrived at the base on 17 January.

=== 2026 USAF KC-135 deployment ===
On 11 March 2026, the Supreme Council of National Defense (CSAT) and the Parliament of Romania approved the US request for deploying aerial refueling airplanes in support of the US military operations against Iran. The first aircraft arrived on 15 March and began flying their first missions on 20 March. As of June 2026, at least 10 KC-135 aircraft are based at Otopeni.

== Air base equipment ==
In 2026, the RoAF 90th air base equipment consisted of:

- 3 C-130B (5927, 5930, 6166)
- 3 C-130H (7432, 9142, 9143)
- 7 C-27J (2701, 2702, 2703, 2704, 2705, 2706, 2707)
- 1 AN-26 (810)
- 1 AN-30 (1104)
- 3 IAR 330 VIP (21, 40, 55), 2 MEDEVAC (75, 106), 3 TRANSPORT (74, 77, 08)

=== Stored equipment ===
- 1 C-130B (6150)
- 1 C-130H (6191)
- 1 AN-26 (801)
- 1 Antonov An-30 (1105)
- 2 IAR 330 Puma (07, 10)

== Based units ==
The following flying and non-flying units are located at Otopeni.

Air Force General Staff

- 90th Airlift Base Command
  - 90th Air Operations Center
  - 90th Operational Group
    - 901st Strategic Airlift Squadron
    - 902nd Airlift and Aerophotogrammetry Squadron
    - 903rd Transport Helicopter Squadron
  - 90th Force Protection Group
    - 905th Anti-Aircraft Artillery Battalion
    - Military Police Company
  - Logistic Support Group
  - 90th Support Group
    - 908th Infrastructure Company
    - Communications and Information Technology Company
    - Engineer Company
    - Transport Company
    - Service Platoon

== Decorations ==
Pre–1990

The unit has received the following decorations:

- Order of the Defense of the Fatherland (3rd class – 1951)

Post–1990

The 90th Airlift Base has received the following decorations:

- Order of Aeronautical Virtue, (Peacetime, Knight – 2011, Officer – 2019, Commander – 2024; Wartime, Knight – 2021)

== Gallery ==
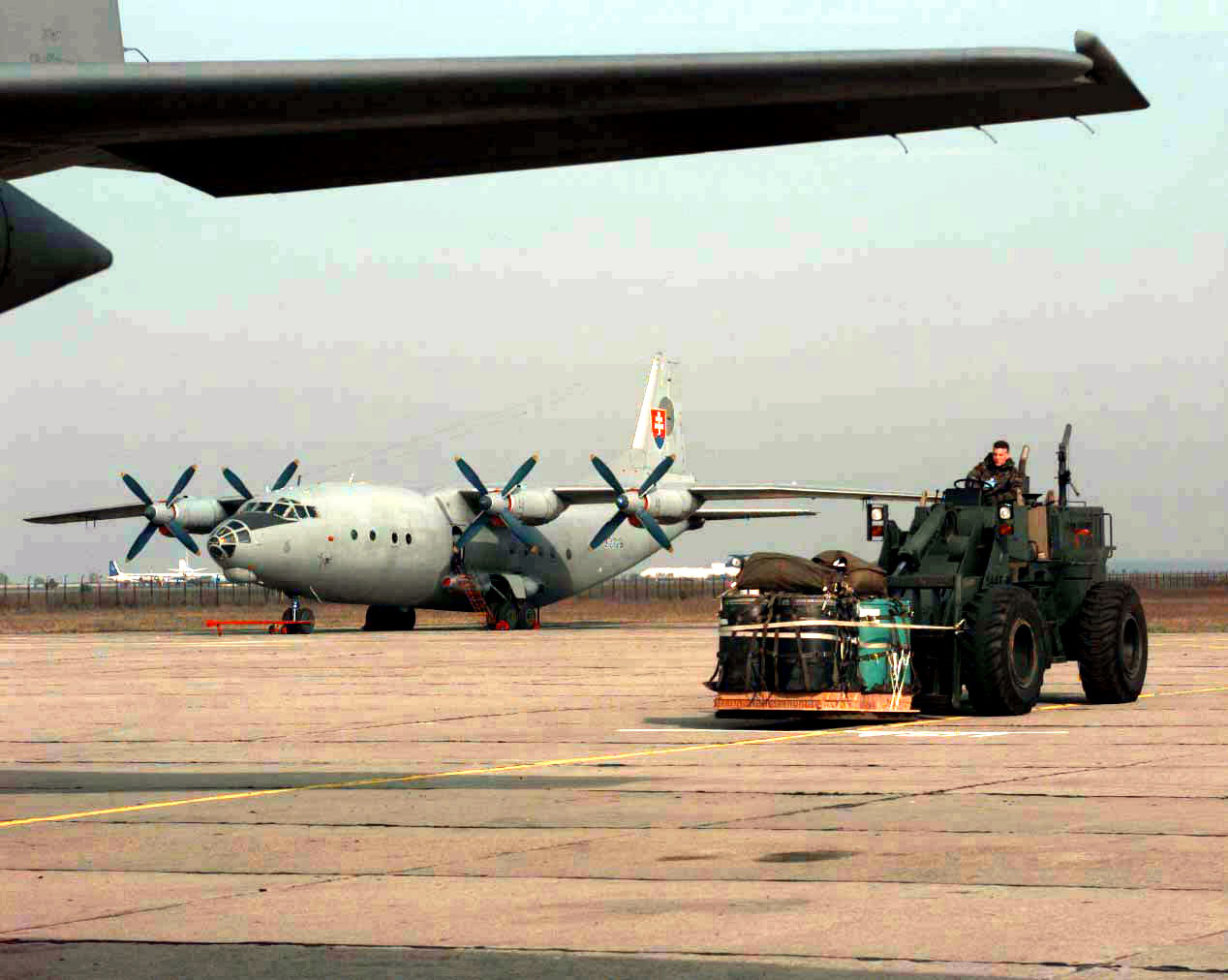
Slovak Air Force An-12 during exercise Cooperative Key '96

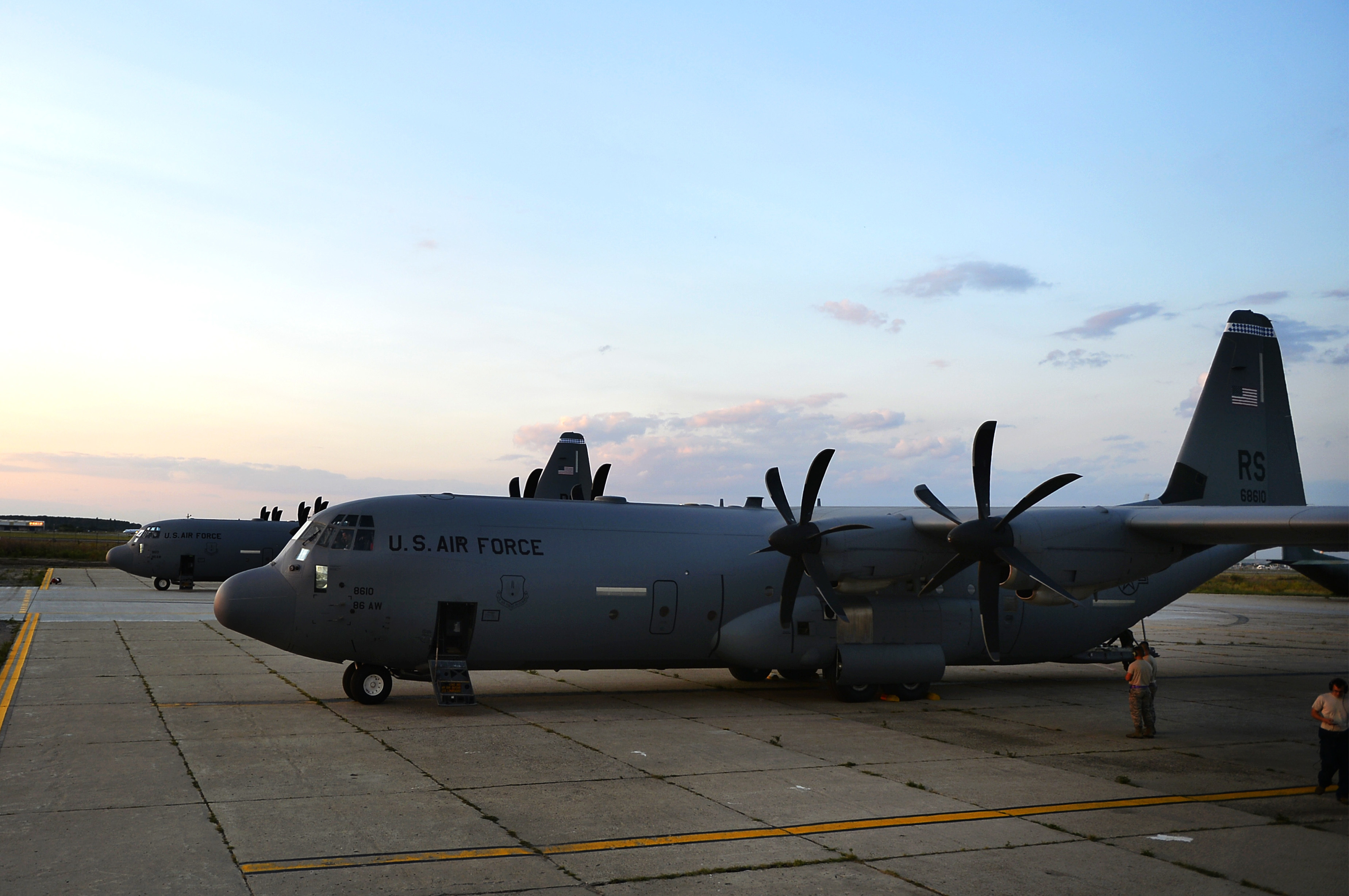
C-130J Super Hercules aircraft at Otopeni in 2017

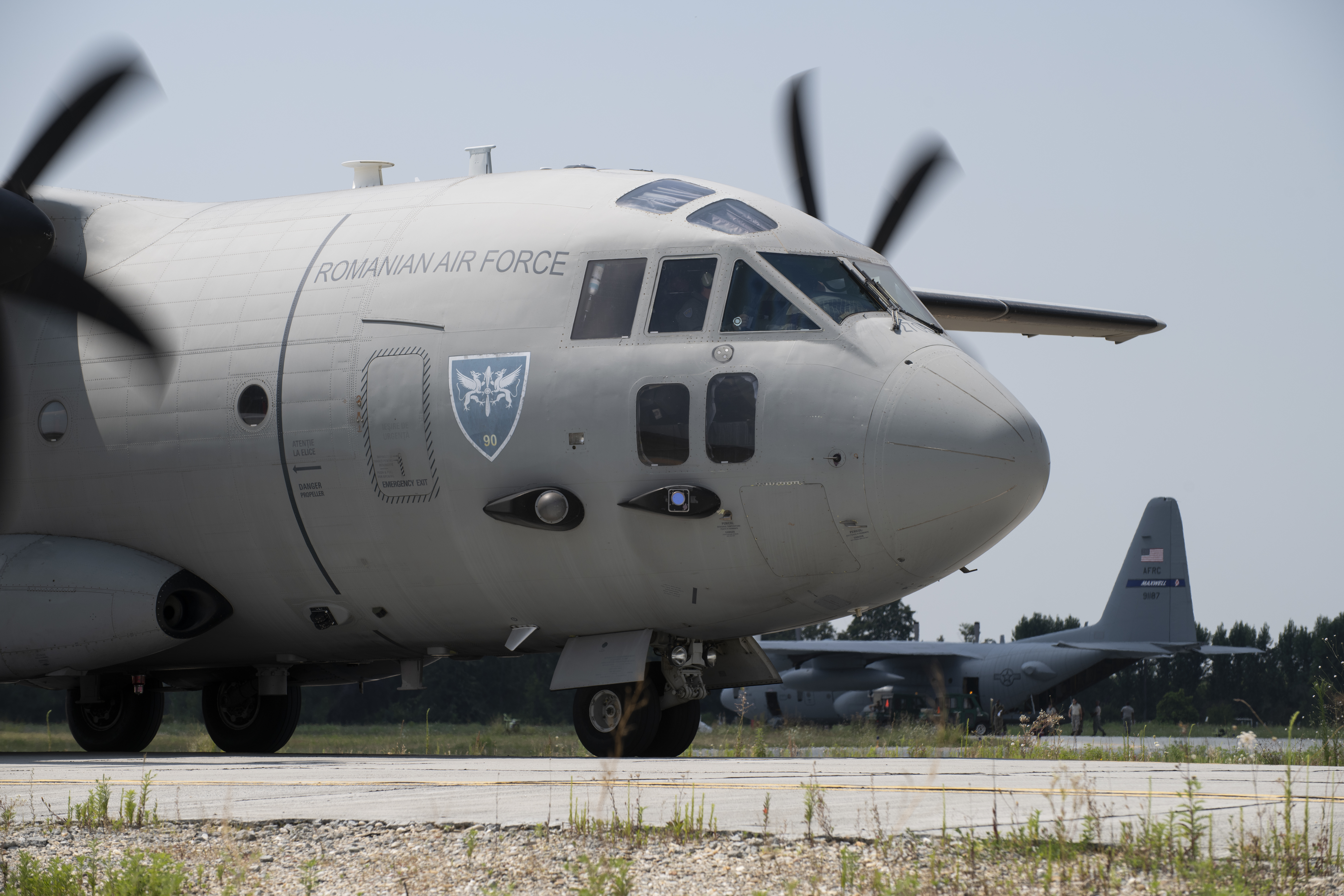
Romanian C-27J and US C-130 during Carpathian Summer 19

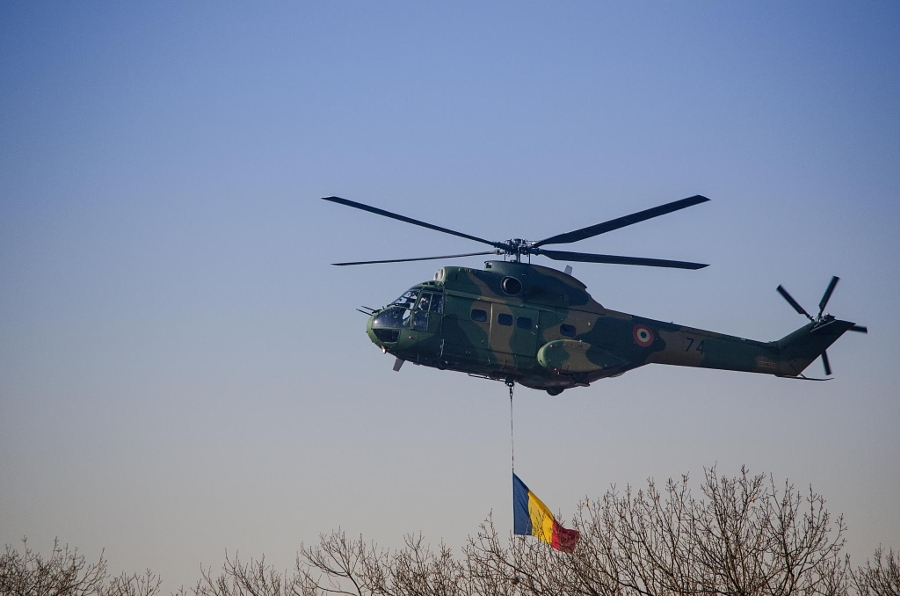
IAR 330 in flight

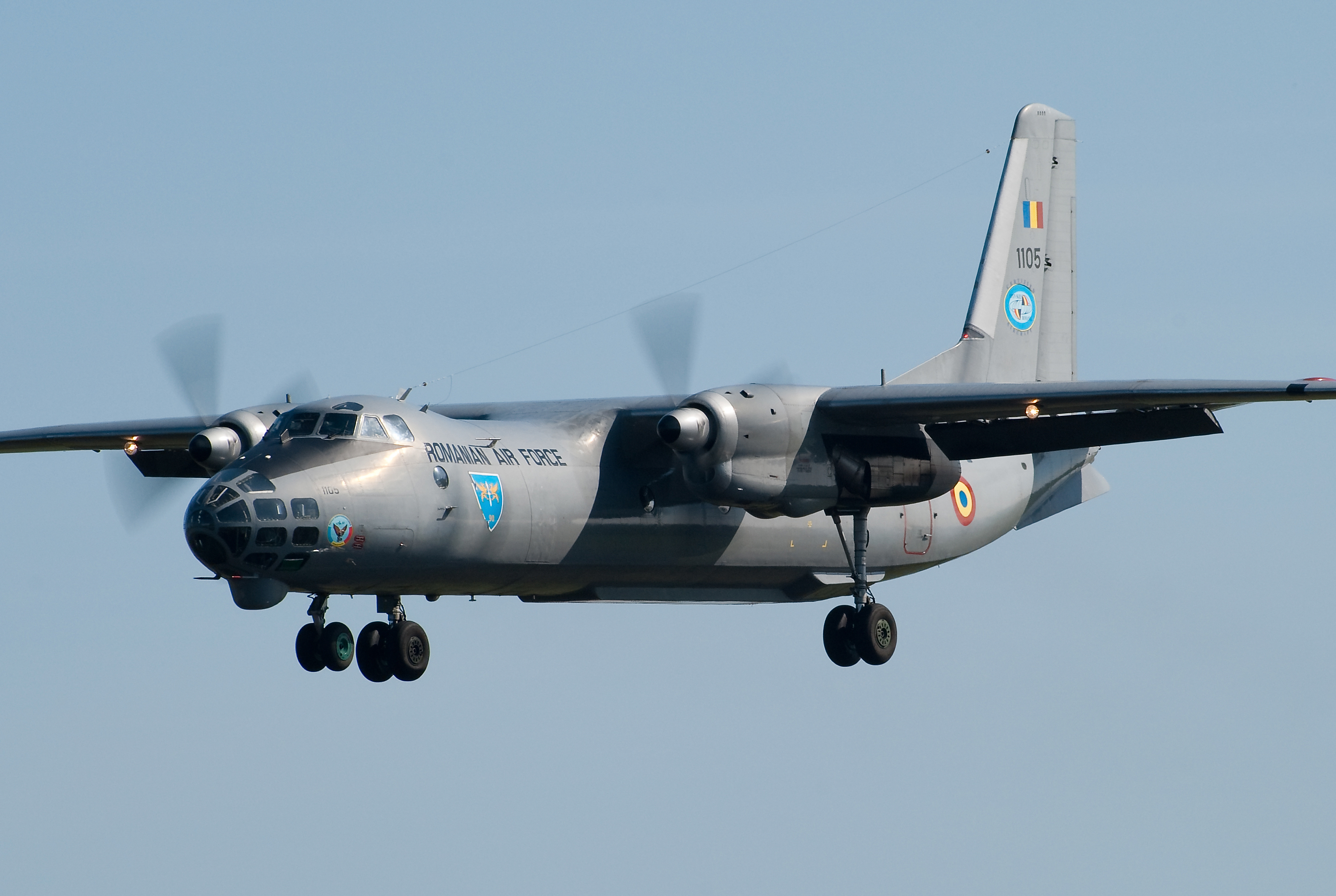
AN-30 at 90th Airlift Base

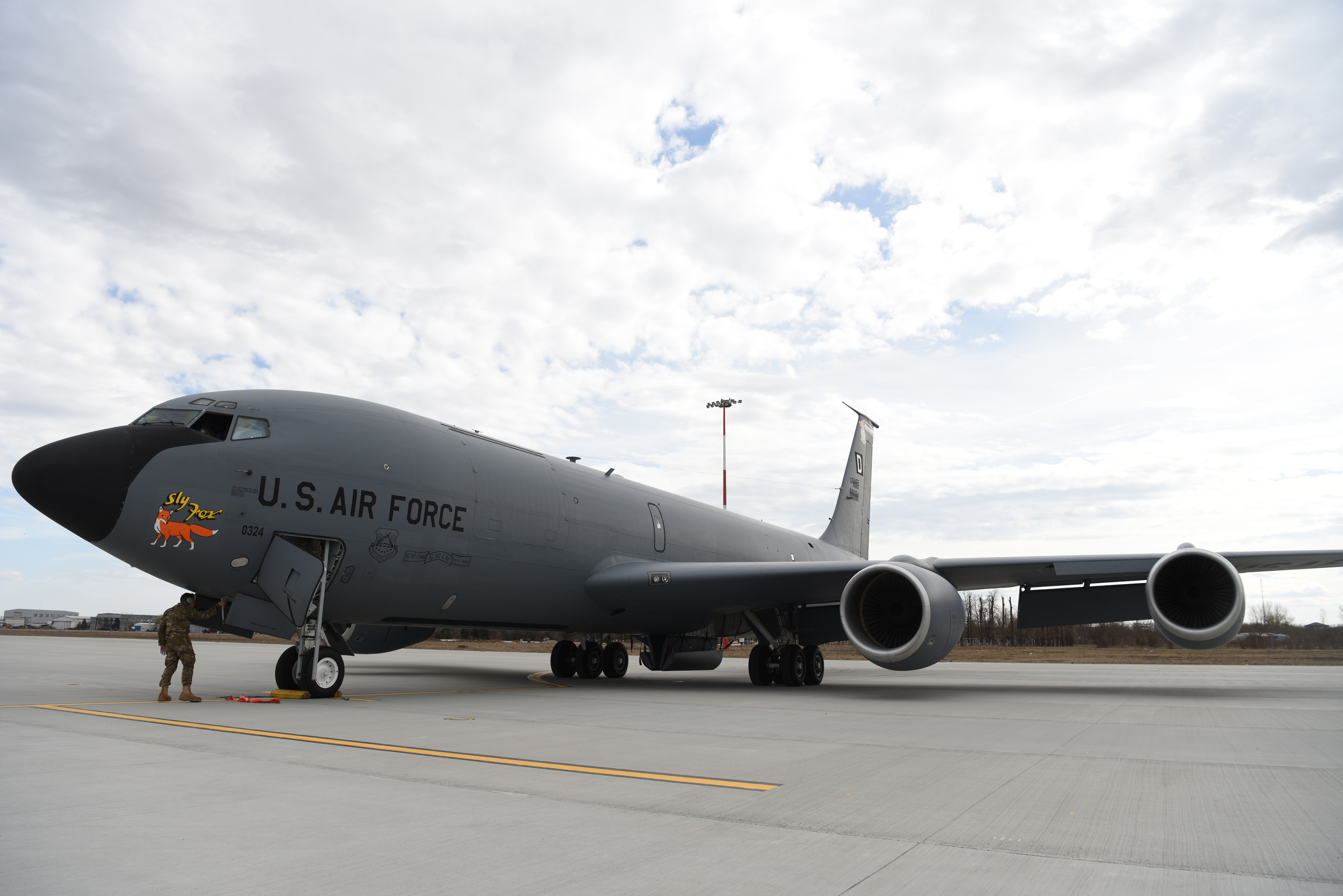
KC-135 Stratotanker "Sly Fox" in 2019

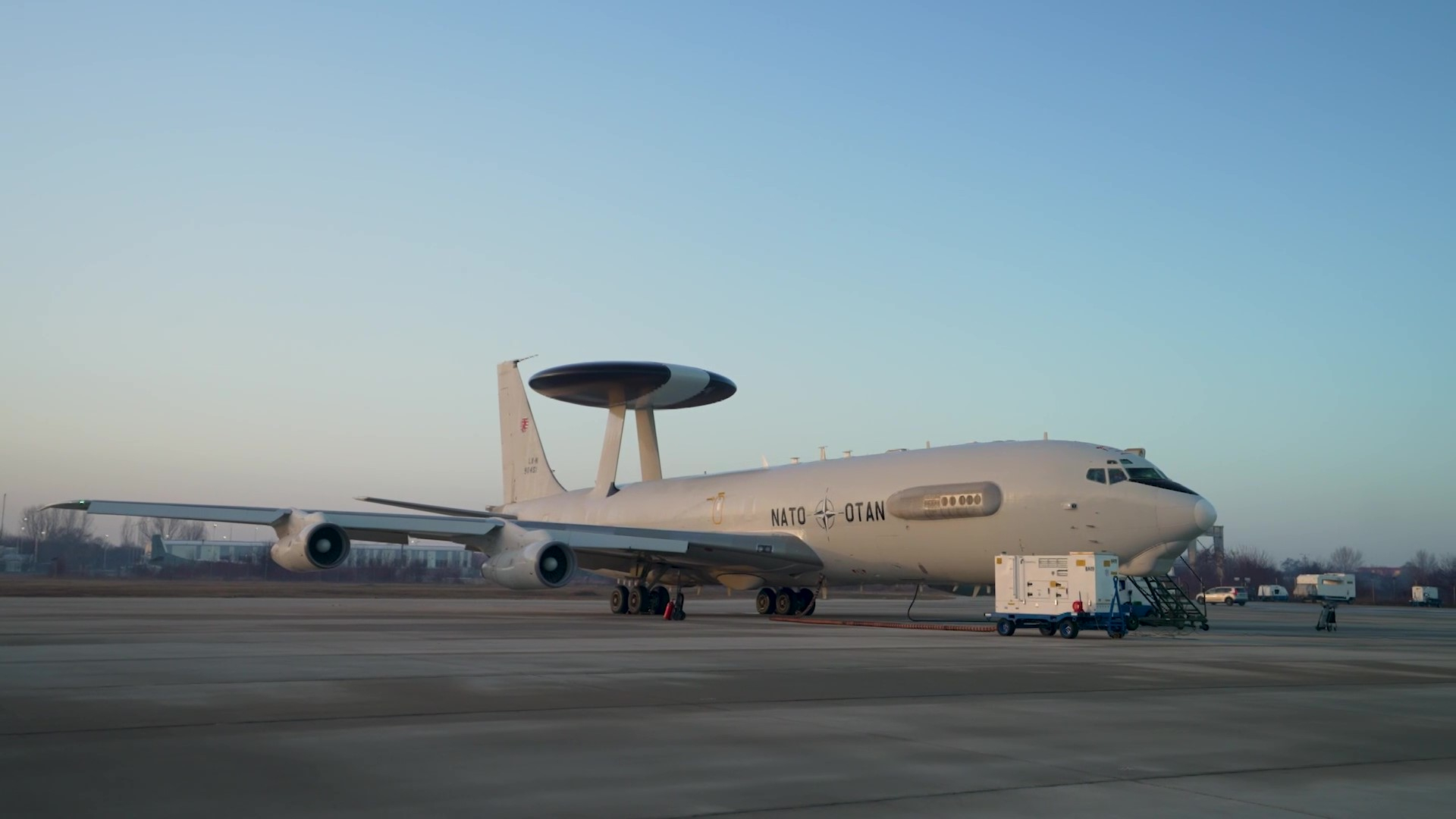
NATO AWACS aircraft parked at the base
