= General de flotilă aeriană =

Romanian Air Force rank

Air flotilla general General de flotilă aeriană
- Shoulder and sleeve insignia
- Country: Romania
- Service branch: Romanian Air Force
- Rank group: General officer
- NATO rank code: OF-6
- Formation: 11 July 1995
- Next higher rank: General-maior
- Next lower rank: Comandor

Related articles
- History: General de escadră aeriană

General de flotilă aeriană (lit. 'Air flotilla general') is a rank in the Romanian Air Force, introduced on 11 July 1995. Within the NATO rank structure is rated OF-6, as such is equivalent to Brigadier general or Air commodore. The previous Royal Romanian Air Force of the Kingdom of Romania also had a similar rank called General de escadră aeriană.

== Description ==
The term "flotilă aeriană" (air flotilla) was introduced in 1929. Equivalent to an air wing and usually consisting of three air groups, the unit existed until 1949 when the flotillas were converted to aviation regiments. The present-day Air Bases of the Romanian Air Force were also briefly renamed to flotillas between 2010 and 2013.

The insignia worn on the sleeves has a 35 mm wide braid (called galon or tresă), a 25 mm wide braid and a 12 mm wide braid. Like all air force rank insignia, the topmost braid is folded in the shape of a rhombus. The shoulder insignia consists of a 45 mm wide braid made from yellow silk thread and gold metallic thread with a single metallic thread star embroidered on top and a 1 mm blue textile border.
