= Cioca Airfield =

Cioca Airfield Aerodromul Cioca
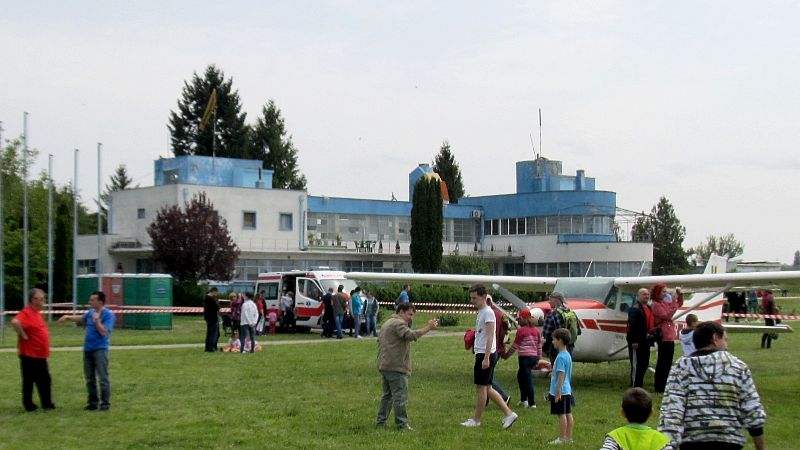
- IATA: none; ICAO: none

Summary
- Airport type: Public
- Owner: Timiș County Council
- Location: Timișoara, Romania
- Opened: 1936
- Elevation AMSL: 86 m (282 ft)
- Coordinates: 45°47′20″N 21°11′32″E

Map
- Location of Cioca Airfield in Romania

Runways
Direction	Length		Surface
Direction	m	ft	Surface
05/23	700 × 30	2,297 × 98	Grass

Timișoara Utility Airport is an airport located in the northwestern part of Timișoara. It is also known as Cioca Airfield or, sometimes, Timișoara West Airfield. It is used by owners of small- and medium-sized aircraft for recreational flying, by air taxi companies, as well as by utility aircraft spraying fields with fertilizers and insecticides. Cioca Airfield was for a short time the main airport of Timișoara.

The airfield was built in the interwar period, in 1936, as the civil airport of Timișoara. Approximately 5 million lei were allocated for the project, which included an air terminal, a hangar, and buildings for transmissions and telegraphy. Construction was done by the firm of architectural engineer August Schmiedigen from Bucharest; the works were completed in 1938. Due to financial difficulties encountered during the construction works, as well as findings that the site had unsuitable soil conditions—clayey ground causing water to stagnate at the surface—the plan to establish the airport at Cioca was abandoned. The buildings that had already been constructed were subsequently transferred to the Central Meteorological Institute.

The first flights from here, on the Bucharest–Timișoara–Arad route, began in 1937 and were operated by LARES. During World War II, between 1941–1944, the Cioca Airfield was used by the German aviation Luftwaffe, during the communist period by Aviasan, and nowadays it is the property of the Timiș County Council. The Council has initiated a large-scale rehabilitation project, which includes the renovation of the old air terminal and the administrative building, with an investment of over 2.7 million lei.
