= Airport code =

Airport code may refer to:

- International Air Transport Association airport code, a three-letter code which is used in passenger reservation, ticketing, and baggage-handling systems
- International Civil Aviation Organization airport code, a four-letter code which is used by air-traffic control systems and for airports that do not have an IATA airport code

== See also ==
- Airline codes
- Location identifier
