= Operation Tidal Wave =

1943 U.S. strategic bombing campaign of oil refineries in Ploiești, Romania during WWII

- Part of Western Allied campaign in Romania
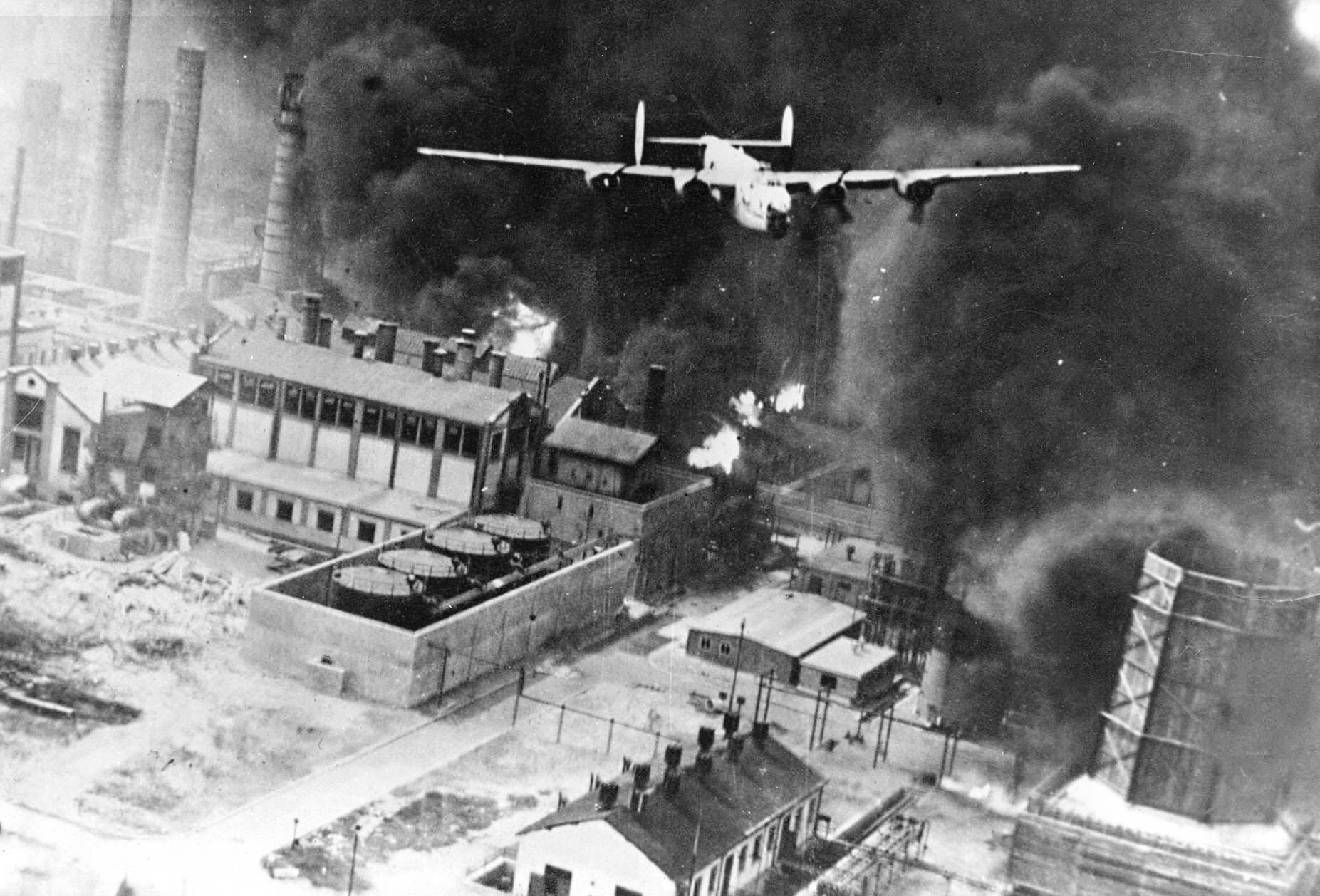
- The B-24 Liberator Sandman during a bomb run over the Ploiești Astra Română refinery during Operation Tidal Wave
Date	1 August 1943
Location	Romanian refineries: Câmpina, Ploiești, Brazi 44°56′N 26°1′E
Result	Axis victory

Belligerents
United States	Romania; Germany; Bulgaria

Commanders and leaders
(United States) Lewis H. Brereton (United States) Uzal G. Ent	(Nazi Germany) Alfred Gerstenberg (Kingdom of Romania) Gheorghe Jienescu

Strength
177 B-24s (162 over the target)	36 heavy AA batteries 16 light/medium AA batteries 57 fighters

Casualties and losses
53 B-24s destroyed (34 claimed in Romania); 55 B-24s damaged 310 aircrew killed or missing 190 aircrew captured or interned	7 fighters destroyed (2 Romanian and 5 German); 11 fighters damaged (2 Romanian and 9 German); 19 dead and 97 wounded
- 101 civilians killed and 238 injured

Operation Tidal Wave was an air attack by bombers of the United States Army Air Forces (USAAF) based in Libya on nine oil refineries around Ploiești, Romania, on 1 August 1943, during World War II. It was a strategic bombing mission and part of the "oil campaign" to deny petroleum-based fuel to the Axis powers. The mission resulted in "no curtailment of overall product output but a drastic reduction in spare capacity".

Due to the number of aircraft available and the long distance, the mission was conceived as low level attack using Consolidated B-24 Liberator with the advantage of surprise against relatively undefended targets. However the aircraft were not designed for low level use and the targets were well defended by many anti-aircraft guns and German and Romanian fighter squadrons. As a result the operation was one of the costliest for the USAAF in the European Theater, with 53 aircraft - about a third of those committed - and 500 aircrewmen lost. It was proportionally the most costly major Allied air raid of the war, and its date was later referred to as "Black Sunday".

Five Medals of Honor and 56 Distinguished Service Crosses, along with numerous other awards, went to Operation Tidal Wave crew members. A 1999 research report prepared for the Air War College at Maxwell Air Force Base in Alabama concluded that the bombing campaign in Ploiești was "one of the bloodiest and most heroic missions of all time". One of the downed American planes crashed into a women's prison in Ploiești, resulting in about half of the civilian casualties from the total of 101 killed and 238 injured.

== Background ==
Romania had been a major power in the oil industry since the 1800s. It was one of the largest producers in Europe, and Ploiești was a major part of that production. The Ploiești oil refineries provided about 30% of all Axis oil production.

=== Axis air defenses ===
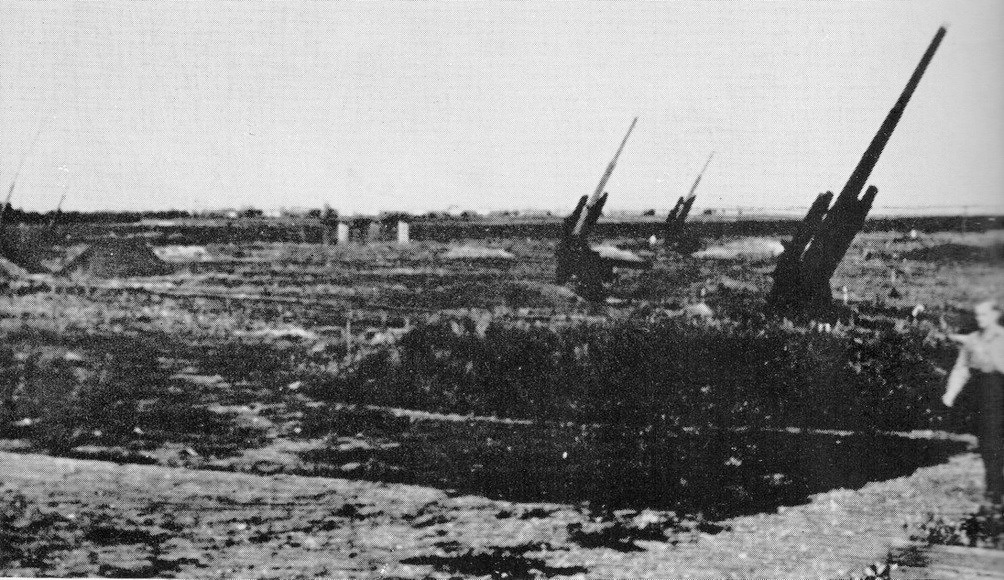
A battery of 88 mm anti-aircraft guns near Ploiești

In June 1942, 13 B-24 Liberators of the "Halverson project" (HALPRO) attacked Ploiești. Though damage was slight, Germany and Romania responded by putting strong anti-aircraft defenses around Ploiești. Luftwaffe General Alfred Gerstenberg built one of the heaviest and best-integrated air defense networks in Europe. The defenses included several hundred large-caliber 88mm flak guns and many more small caliber guns. The latter were concealed in haystacks, railroad cars, and mock buildings. German and Romanian AA artillery at Ploiești consisted of 36 heavy (88 mm) and 16 medium and light (37 mm and 20 mm) anti-aircraft batteries. The heavy batteries were further supplemented by 15 Würzburg radar stations used for fire control.

The defenses were divided between two regiments of the German 5th Flak Division (21 heavy, 10 medium and light batteries) and the Romanian 7th AA Regiment (15 heavy, 6 medium and light batteries). Half of the manpower of the German 5th Flak Division was Romanian. Additionally, smoke generators and 23 barrage balloons were deployed. The Axis had 57 fighters within flight range of Ploiești (Messerschmitt Bf 109 fighters and Messerschmitt Bf 110 twin-engined night fighters, plus assorted types of Romanian IAR 80 fighters). For the defense of Ploiești, the Royal Romanian Air Force had aircraft from five Escadrile (squadrons): 61 (IAR 80A), 62 (IAR 80B), 45 (IAR 80C), 53 (Bf 109G) and 51 (Bf 110C). The Germans had another four Staffeln: (Note: Generally smaller than an Allied squadron with around 9 aircraft operational at any time) 1, 2, 3./JG4 (Bf 109G) and 10./NJG6 (Bf 110). These defenses made Ploiești the third or fourth most heavily defended target in Axis Europe, after Berlin and Vienna or the Ruhr industrial region, and thus the most heavily defended Axis target outside the Third Reich.

=== Mission plan ===
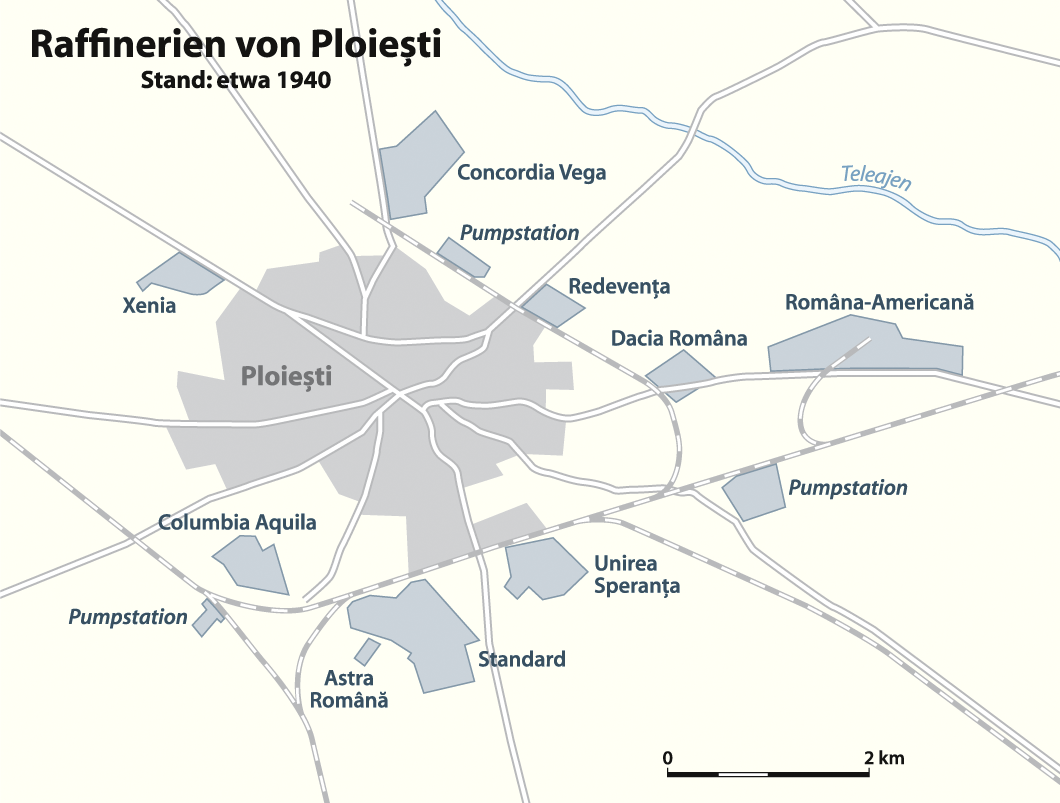
The refineries of Ploiești

The case for targeting Romania's oil refineries was set forth at the Casablanca Conference by Winston Churchill, who believed that destroying them would deal the "knockout blow" to the German war effort. However, due to a lack of resources for organizing other attacks, the plans were put on hold.

The plans were resumed in April 1943, when General Henry H. Arnold commissioned his staff to continue their development. Two plans were conceived: one called for a high-altitude attack to be launched from Syrian bases, while the other called launched from Libya. Colonel Jacob E. Smart conceived a very low-altitude attack reasoning that a smaller force of bombers at low level with the element of surprise against weak defenses could achieve the same effects as many more aircraft bombing from high altitude. The aircraft available were the B-24s but it was not designed for low level flight. The code name for the mission was Operation Statesman, which was later changed to Operation Soapsuds, and finally to Operation Tidal Wave. In charge of the operation was General Lewis H. Brereton. Brereton made the choice of low-level attack and stuck with it despite petitioning from the group commanders and Brigadier General Uzal Ent chief of IX Bomber Command and the planner of the details of the operation. Air Chief Marshal Sir Arthur Tedder, the commander of air forces, both British and American, in the Mediterranean, suggested a postponement or cancelling and making attacks on aircraft factories instead but Brereton opposed it on grounds that the refineries were more important than factories, training was almost complete and cancelling would be bad for morale. At a conference in July Brereton did not invite discussion of the plan and stressed that any commander who showed lack of leadership, aggression or confidence in the mission should be immediately relieved.

The Ninth Air Force (98th and 376th Bombardment Groups) was responsible for the overall conduct of the raid. To reach the necessary number of bombers, the partially formed Eighth Air Force from England provided three additional bomb groups (44th, 93rd, and the new and inexperienced 389th). Due to the distance involved, all the bombers employed were B-24 Liberators.

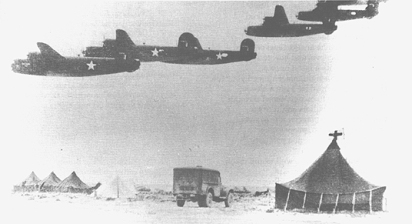
B-24s taking off from Benghazi, Libya on 20 July 1943.

Based on HALPRO's experiences, the planners decided Tidal Wave would be executed by day and that the attacking bombers would approach at low altitude during the last leg of their run to avoid detection by German radar. Training included extensive review of a detailed 1:5000 three dimensional map provided by the RAF, practice raids over a mock-up of the target in the Libyan desert, and practical exercises over a number of secondary targets in July to prove the viability of such a low-level strike. The crews were told - through informational films - that the defenders would be largely Romanian pilots and there were only 80 heavy AA guns and 160 smaller ones arranged for night time attacks and operated by indifferent Romanian gun crews. This was wishful thinking - in reality there were four times the heavy artillery and many German gun crews.

The bombers to be used were each fitted with a (releasable) fuel tank in their bombbay to increase their fuel capacity to 3,100 US gallons (12,000 L) at the cost of some of the bombload. The Norden bombsights were replaced with low-level bombsights and the lead B-24s - which were expected to suppress the enemy defences - were also fitted with two nose mounted .50-cal (12.5 mm) machine guns, which were operated by the pilot. The dorsal turrets of the lead aircraft were modified to be able to fire to the front as well. The aircraft of the 389th had their ventral ball turrets removed to move weight balance forward and so improve fuel economy.

To put 156 aircraft over the target, the planners had determined that 186 aircraft would need to start the mission. There were problems with keeping aircraft operational due to the effect of the desert environment on the engines, compounded with lack of spare engines. (Note: A start of the preparations leading up to the mission, of the 196 aircraft available, 131 were operational) RAF workshops took on the overhaul of engines for the Ninth Air Force.

The ordnance carried by the bombers consisted of 500 lb (230 kg) and 1,000 lb (450 kg) high-explosive bombs, supplemented by incendiary bombs. All were armed with delayed action fuses varying in time from 45 seconds to six hours.

Originally the operation was to consist of 154 bombers, but the final number reached 178, with a total of 1,751 aircrew, one of the largest commitments of American heavy bombers and crewmen up to that time. The planes were to fly from airfields near Benghazi, Libya. They were to cross the Mediterranean and the Adriatic Sea, pass near the island of Corfu, cross over the Pindus Mountains in Albania, cross southern Yugoslavia, enter southwestern Romania, and turn east toward Ploiești. Reaching Ploiești, they were to locate predetermined checkpoints, approach their targets from the north, and strike all targets simultaneously. The five main refineries of Ploiești were designated as targets White 1-5, while the Creditul Minier refinery in Brazi was designated target Blue, and Steaua Română in Câmpina was designated target Red.

For political reasons, the Allied planners decided to avoid the city of Ploiești itself so that it would not be bombed by accident.

== Order of battle ==
=== Ninth and Eighth Air Force ===
- Ninth Air Force, General Uzal G. Ent, (Note: Awarded Distinguished Service Cross)
  - 98th Bombardment Group (Heavy) ("Pyramiders"), Col. John R. Kane (Note: awarded Medal of Honor)
    - 343rd Bombardment Squadron
    - 344th Bombardment Squadron
    - 345th Bombardment Squadron
  - 376th Bombardment Group (Heavy) ("Liberandos"), Col. Keith K. Compton
    - 512th Bombardment Squadron
    - 513th Bombardment Squadron
    - 514th Bombardment Squadron
    - 515th Bombardment Squadron
- Eighth Air Force
  - 44th Bombardment Group (Heavy) ("Flying Eight Balls"), Col. Leon W. Johnson
    - 66th Bombardment Squadron
    - 67th Bombardment Squadron
    - 68th Bombardment Squadron
    - 506th Bombardment Squadron
  - 93rd Bombardment Group (Heavy) ("Flying Circus"), Lt.Col. Addison Baker, Maj. John L. Jerstad
    - 328th Bombardment Squadron
    - 329th Bombardment Squadron
    - 330th Bombardment Squadron
    - 409th Bombardment Squadron
  - 389th Bombardment Group (Heavy) ("Sky Scorpions"), Col. Jack W. Wood, 2nd Lt. Lloyd Herbert Hughes
    - 564th Bombardment Squadron
    - 565th Bombardment Squadron
    - 566th Bombardment Squadron
    - 567th Bombardment Squadron

Target disposition
Target	Designation	Unit	Aircraft dispatched
Româno-Americana (Note: Owned by Standard Oil of New Jersey)	White I	376th	28
Concordia Vega (Note: Owned by Petrofina)	White II	93rd	25
Standard Petrol, Unirea Sperența (Note: Owned by Phoenix Oil and Transport Company)	White III	93rd	12
Astra Română, (Note: Owned by Royal Dutch Shell) Unirea Orion	White IV	98th	47
Columbia Aquila (Note: Owned by Omnium Français des Petroles)	White V	44th	17
Creditul Minier	Blue	44th	20
Steaua Română	Red	389th	29

=== Romanian and German ===
- Luftflotte 4 – Jagdfliegerführer Rumänien Otopeni
  - IV./Nachtjagdgeschwader 6 – Ziliștea, with Bf 110
    - 10./NJG6 – Otopeni
    - 12./NJG6 (Escadrila 51 Vânătoare de Noapte) – Otopeni
  - I./Jagdgeschwader 4 – Mizil, with Bf 109
    - 1./JG4
    - 2./JG4
    - 3./JG4
    - 4./JG4 (Escadrila 53 Vânătoare)
- Flotila 2 Vânătoare Pipera
  - Grupul 6 Vânătoare – Pipera, with IAR 80
    - Escadrila 61 Vânătoare
    - Escadrila 62 Vânătoare
- Flotila 3 Vânătoare
  - Grupul 4 Vânătoare
    - Escadrila 45 Vânătoare – Târgșor, with IAR 80

Fighters available
Unit	Available	Total
1, 2, 3./JG4, 10./NJG6	26	61
Gr. 6 Vt. (2 squadrons)	13	24
Esc. 45 Vt.	6	12
Esc. 51 Vt. Noapte (12./NJG6)	6	12
Esc. 53 Vt. (4./JG4)	6	9
Total aircraft	57	118

== Tidal Wave ==
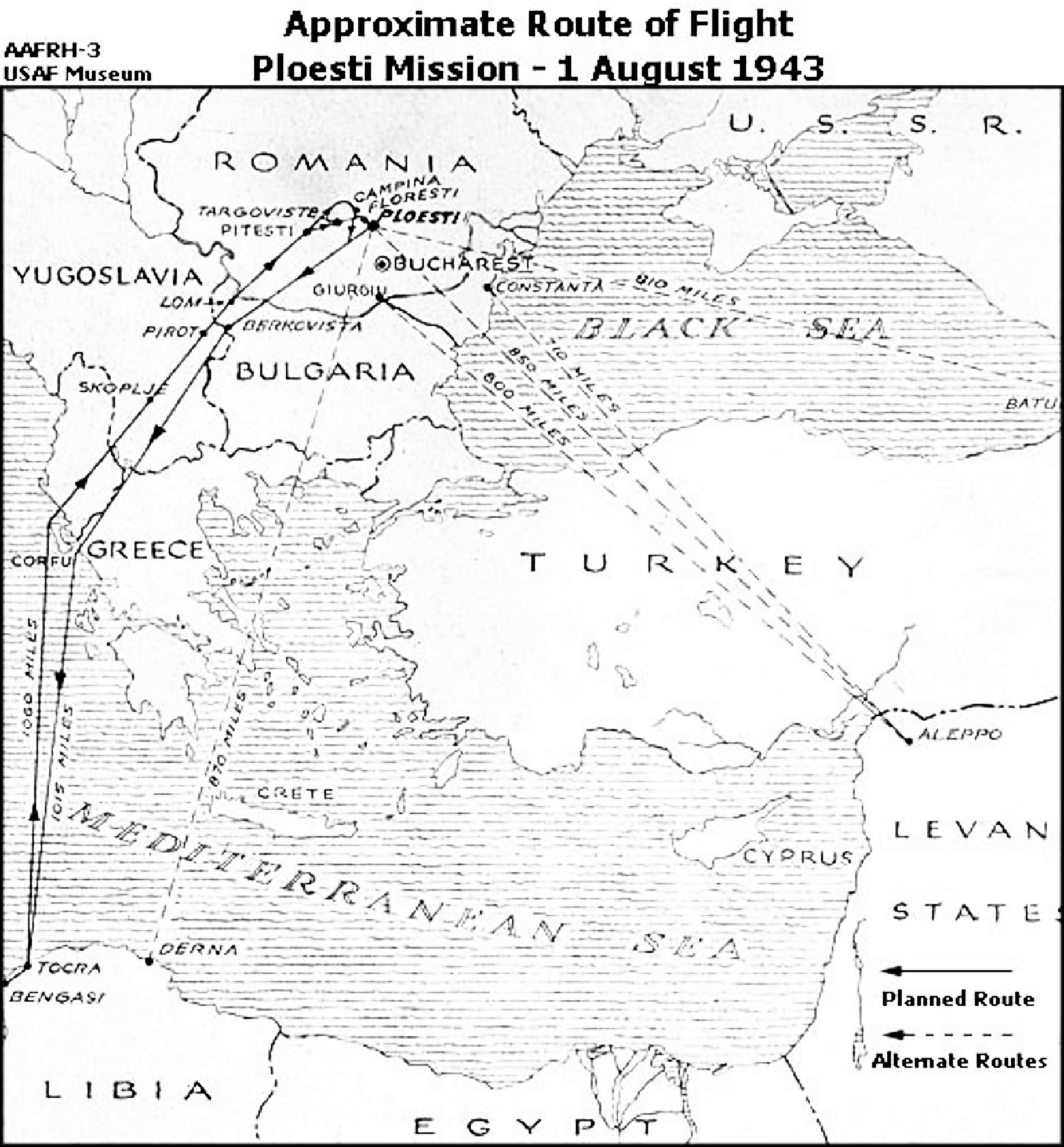
Approximate route of flight to Ploiești on August 1, 1943.

The day before the operation, Tedder, Brereton and Ent toured the camps speaking encouragement to the crews and emphasising the importance of the mission. Tedder said "It's a hard dangerous mission. It will take all your famous American courage and resourcefulness".

On the morning of 1 August 1943, starting around 04:00 the five groups comprising the strike force took off from their home airfields around Benghazi. Large amounts of dust kicked up during takeoff caused limited visibility and strained engines already carrying the burden of large bomb loads and additional fuel. These conditions contributed to the loss of one aircraft, Kickapoo, during takeoff, but 177 of the planned 178 aircraft departed safely. The number of aircraft in each group were 376th - 28, 93rd - 37 , 98th - 46, 44th - 37, 389th - 29. The transit of the Mediterranean was at between 2,000 and 4,000 ft (610 and 1,220 m).

=== Into the Balkans ===
The formation reached the Adriatic Sea without further incident. However as they reached Corfu instead of climbing to 10,000 ft (3,000 m) on signal with the rest, aircraft #28, Wongo Wongo of the 376th Bombardment Group (the lead ship of the lead group, numbering about 40 B-24s) piloted by Lt. Brian Flavelle, began to fly erratically before spiralling into the sea due to an unexplained malfunction and exploding. Lt. Guy Iovine—a friend of Flavelle who was piloting aircraft #23 Desert Lilly—descended from the formation to look for survivors, narrowly missing another aircraft Brewery Wagon. No survivors were seen, and due to the additional weight of fuel, Iovine was unable to regain altitude to rejoin the formation and resume course to Ploiești and turned back to base.

The resulting confusion was compounded by the inability to regain cohesion due to orders to maintain strict radio silence. Ten other aircrews returned to friendly airfields after the incident, and the remaining aircraft faced the 9,000 ft (2,700 m) climb over the Pindus mountains, which were shrouded in cloud cover. Although all five groups made the climb around 11,000 ft (3,400 m), the 376th and 93rd, using high power settings, pulled ahead of the trailing formations, causing variations in speed and time which disrupted the synchronization of the group attacks deemed so important by Smart. The weather conditions contributed to the formations spreading and losing sight of each other - nearing the Danube the two leading groups flew over the cloud cover, the following three choosing to go under it. Mission leaders deemed these concerns to be less important than maintaining security through radio silence. Although the Americans' orders would have allowed them to break radio silence to rebuild their formations, the strike proceeded without correction, and this proved costly. The 98th having lost sight of the leading groups, thought it had ended up ahead and flew to the west to allow what it thought was the 93rd to take the lead until it recognised the error and took the lead of the three again.

While in flight towards Bulgaria, the bomber formations were detected by German radar. The bombers were also spotted by Bulgarian Avia B-534s, which took off to protect Sofia.

Earlier that day, a German signal station picked up a message from the Ninth Air Force regarding the departure of a large bomber formation. While the destination of the bombers could not be determined, the information was relayed further to other Luftwaffe units, including Jagdfliegerführer Rumänien. The American leaders were unaware that the Germans knew of their presence.

=== Over Romania ===
As they were passing the Danube, the B-24s descended to 2,300 ft (700 m) and continued at low altitude. Although now well strung out on approach to Pitești, all five groups made the navigational checkpoint 65 mi (105 km) from Ploiești. At Pitești, they descended to minimum altitude - around 500 ft (150 m). As planned, the 389th Bomb Group departed for its separate, synchronized approach to the mission target. Continuing from Pitești, Colonel Keith K. Compton and Gen. Ent made a costly navigational error. At Târgoviște, halfway to the next checkpoint at Florești, Compton - thinking the lead aircraft had overshot the Floresti checkpoint - used the radio to order a turn and followed the incorrect railway line for his turn toward Ploiești, setting his group and Lt. Col. Addison Baker's 93rd Bomb Group on a course for Bucharest. In the process, Ent and Compton went against the advice of their airplane's navigator and the Halverson Project veteran Cpt. Harold Wicklund. Now facing disaster, many crews chose to break radio silence and draw attention to the navigational error. Meanwhile, both groups had to face Gerstenberg's extensive air defenses around the Bucharest area in addition to those awaiting them around Ploiești.

Newsreel of the raid

The Romanian and German fighters, although scrambled earlier, were directed to fly at 5,000 m (16,000 ft), as the bombers were expected at high altitude. This error was soon corrected and the fighters were instructed to attack the low-flying bombers. The first contact with the B-24s was made by IAR 80s of Grupul 6 Vânătoare at 11:50 AM, near Săbăreni.

Noticing the navigation error, Lt. John Palm, the pilot of Brewery Wagon, broke off from the 376th Group's formation and attempted to bomb the refineries alone. Badly hit by flak, the aircraft jettisoned its bombs on an empty factory while trying to escape. Soon after, the damaged bomber was engaged by a Bf 109 of 1./JG4, flown by Hauptmann Wilhelm Steinmann. The bomber crash-landed in a field near Tătărani, becoming the first B-24 shot down over Romania. The eight surviving crewmen, including Palm, were taken prisoner.

Hell's Wench, flown by Lt. Col. Baker and his co-pilot Maj. John L. Jerstad, (who had already completed a full tour of duty while stationed in England), also broke formation and led several B-24s to their targets. Hit by flak, they jettisoned their bombs to maintain the lead position of the formation over their target at the Columbia Aquila refinery. Despite heavy losses by the 93rd, Baker and Jerstad maintained course and, once clear, began to climb away. Realizing the aircraft was no longer controllable, they kept climbing to let their crew abandon the aircraft although none survived. Baker and Jerstad were posthumously awarded the Medal of Honor for these actions.

Maj. Ramsay D. Potts, flying The Duchess, and Maj. George S. Brown, aboard Queenie, encountering heavy smoke over Columbia Aquila, led additional aircraft of the 93rd and successfully dropped their bombs over the Astra Română, Unirea Orion, and Columbia Aquila refineries. The 93rd lost 11 aircraft over their targets in Ploiești. One of the bombers, Jose Carioca, was shot down by a Romanian IAR 80 fighter, which went into a half roll and attacked the B-24 upside down, raking its belly with bullets; the bomber crashed into Ploiești Women's Prison. Of the 101 civilians killed and 238 injured in this raid, about half died when this three-story building exploded in flames. Forty women survived, but there were no survivors from Jose Carioca's crew.

The aircraft that shot down Jose Carioca, IAR 80B no. 222, flown by Sublocotenent Carol Anastasescu, was also damaged and set on fire after shooting down another B-24. While the pilot was trying to bail out, the IAR collided with the propeller of another B-24, which severed its vertical stabilizer. Anastasescu, who was thrown clear of the IAR as the airplane crashed in a field, later made a full recovery in hospital.

=== Concordia Vega and first Steaua Română attacks ===
Air defenses were heavy over the 376th's target (Româno-Americana), and Ent instructed Compton to attack "targets of opportunity". Most of the 376th B-24s bombed the Steaua Română refinery at Câmpina from the east, and five headed directly into the already smoldering conflagration over the Concordia Vega refinery. The group of bombers heading to Concordia Vega, led by Lt. Norman Appold, dropped their bombs on a distillation plant of the refinery. At Câmpina, air defenses on overlooking hills were able to fire down into the formation.

=== Astra Română and Columbia Aquila attacks ===
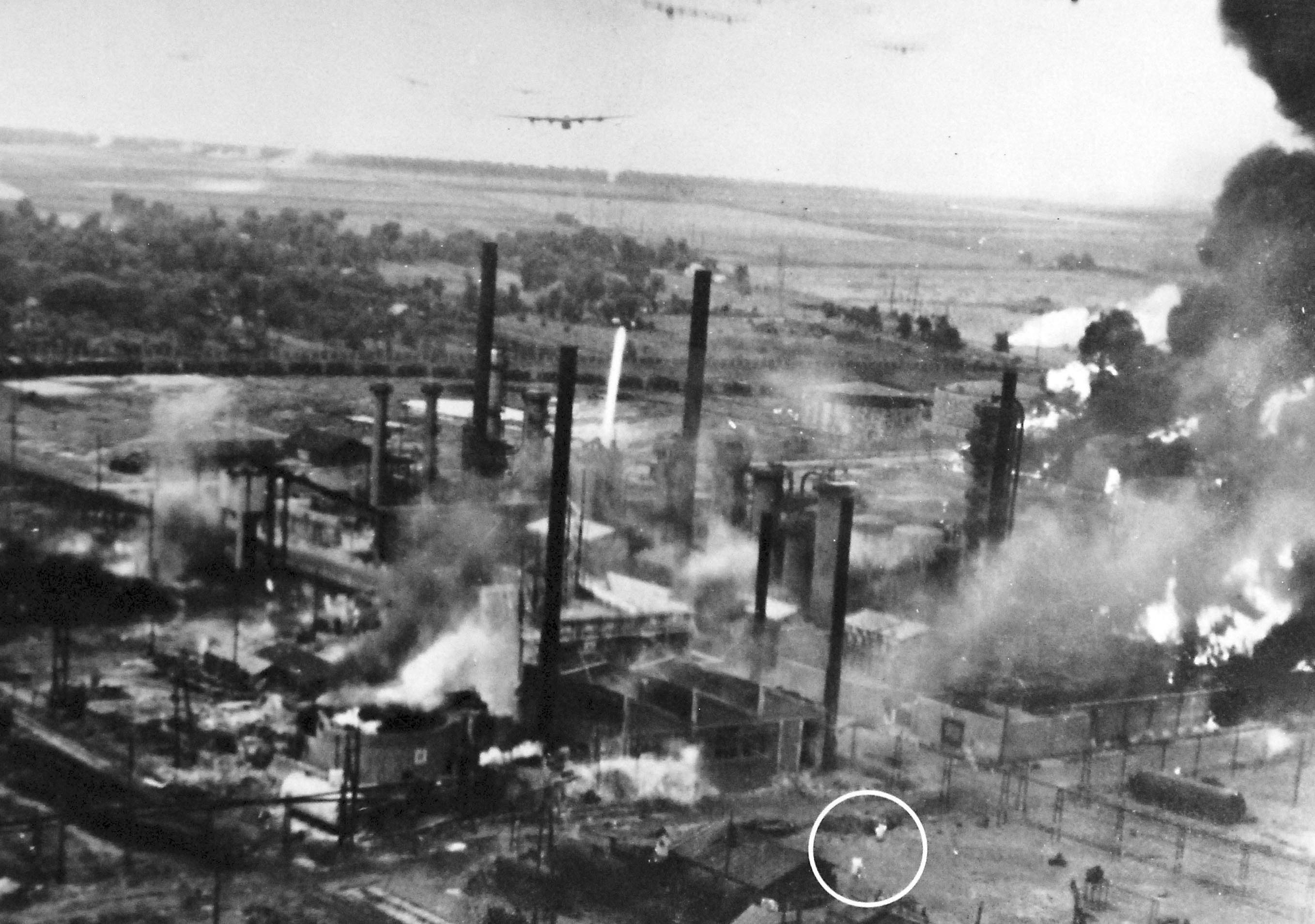
The attack on the Astra Română refinery.

With the 93rd and 376th engaged over the target area, Col. Kane of the 98th Bomb Group and Col. Leon W. Johnson of the 44th Bomb Group made their prescribed turn at Florești and proceeded to their targets at the Astra Română and Columbia Aquila refineries respectively. Both groups found German and Romanian defenses on full alert and faced the full effects of now-raging oil fires, heavy smoke, secondary explosions, and delayed-fuse bombs dropped by Baker's 93rd Bomb Group on their earlier run. Both Kane and Johnson's approach, parallel to the Florești-to-Ploiești railway, led them to encounter "Die Raupe" ("the caterpillar"), a disguised flak train. At treetop level, around 50 ft (15 m) above the ground, the 98th were flying alongside to the left and the 44th on the right. The aircraft gunners firing back at the train disabled the locomotive and killed gun crews.

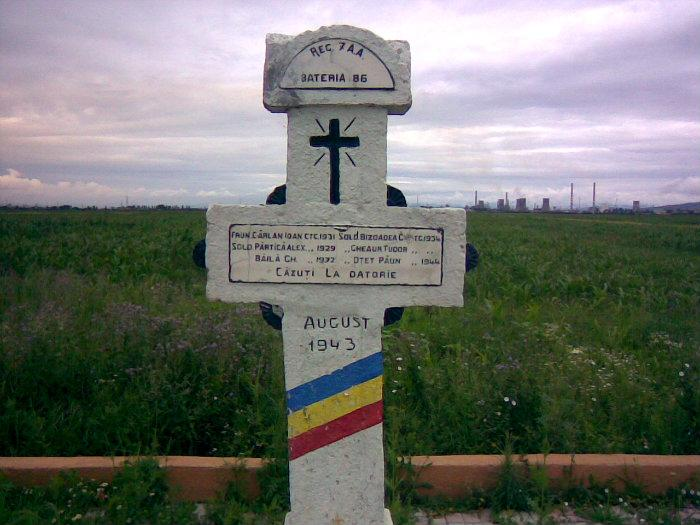
The Corlătești Monument

After the attack on Astra Română, Old Baldy of the 98th Bomb Group was shot at by the 86th Battery of the Romanian 7th Anti-Aircraft Regiment, an 88 mm gun battery, which were positioned near the village of Corlătești. The crew of Old Baldy attempted to engage the battery with their machine guns, but they were hit head-on. The bomber continued flying and crashed on top of the 88 mm gun, killing both its 10-man crew and the six gun crew. The location of the incident is marked by the Corlătești Monument.

With the effects of the 93rd and 376th's runs causing difficulties locating and bombing their primary targets, both Kane and Johnson did not deviate from their intended targets, with the aircraft they were leading taking heavy losses in the process. Their low approach enabled gunners to engage in continued ground suppression of air defense crews directly below them. Lt. Col. James T. Posey took 21 of the 44th's aircraft on a separate assigned attack run on the Creditul Minier refinery, just south of Ploiești. Air defense batteries had already heavily engaged the 93rd and Posey's aircraft received heavy fire from the same emplacements. Maintaining a continued low-level approach into the target area took some of the still heavily laden aircraft through tall grass, and damage was caused by low-level obstructions. Posey and his aircraft—equipped with heavier 1,000 lb (450 kg) bombs—managed to find their marks at Creditul Minier without loss to the formation.

=== Second Steaua Română attack ===
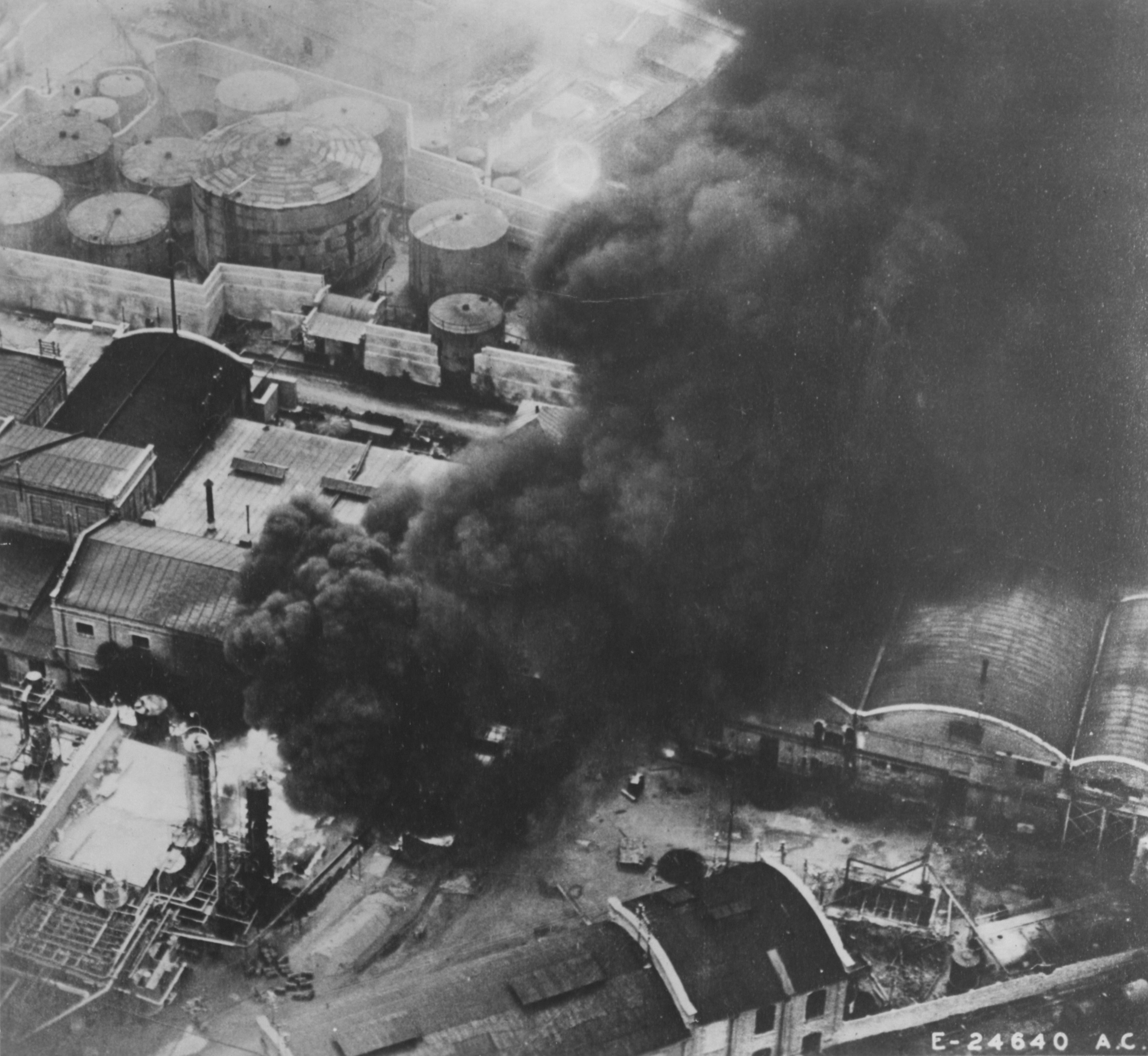
Flames from the distillation plant of Steaua Română after the raid.

The last Tidal Wave attack bombed the Steaua Română refinery, 8 mi (13 km) northwest of Ploieștiat Câmpina. The 389th's attack, led by Col. Jack Wood, ran into some navigation problems as cloud cover made it difficult to spot the Dealu Monastery, an important landmark for the plan. Though the group took a wrong turn, Wood's navigator corrected it, the formation reversing direction twice to drop down into the correct valley leading to the target. The attack on Steaua Română was more complicated than the others, as it required the group to split into three detachments and hit several objectives. The attack proceeded as rehearsed at Benghazi. attacking between 12:10 and 12:20 at heights from 200 to 700 ft (61 to 213 m). The damage caused by the 376th and 389th attacks heavily affected the refinery. The 389th lost four aircraft over the target area, including Ole Kickapoo, flown by 2nd Lt. Lloyd Herbert Hughes. After hits to Ole Kickapoo only 30 ft (9.1 m) over the target area, the flames from earlier bombs ignited fuel leaking from the B-24. Hughes maintained course for bombardier 2nd Lt. John A. McLoughlin to bomb, and the B-24 subsequently crash-landed in an explosive cartwheel in a river bed. Hughes (who posthumously received the Medal of Honor) and six crew members were killed, McLoughlin and two gunners were taken prisoner of war.

=== Return flight ===
On their way over Bulgaria, the B-24s were intercepted by three fighter groups, ten Bf 109s from Karlovo, four Avia B-534s from Bozhurishte, and ten Avia B-534s from Vrashdebna. The pilots, Podporuchik Peter Bochev, Kapitan Tschudomir Toplodolski, Poruchik Stoyan Stoyanov, and Podporuchik Hristo Krastev, gained their first kills for the Bulgarian Air Force of the war (although only two B-24s were registered as having crashed in Bulgaria). The new fighter aces were personally decorated afterwards by Tsar Boris III of Bulgaria with the Order of Bravery, the first time in 25 years. Iron Crosses were awarded a month later from the German embassy.

Other losses occurred over Yugoslavia, where two B-24s collided with each other, and over the Ionian Sea, where five B-24s were shot down by Bf 109s of JG 27. The bomber groups did not attempt to form up together again at as planned but - apart from the 98th and 44th that remained together - returned as separate groups. Some damaged aircraft made for Allied bases on Cyprus, Sicily or Malta. Eight aircraft flew to Turkey. Those that reached Benghazi, arriving between 17:20 and 18:10, had been flying for around 13 to 14 hours.

== Aftermath ==
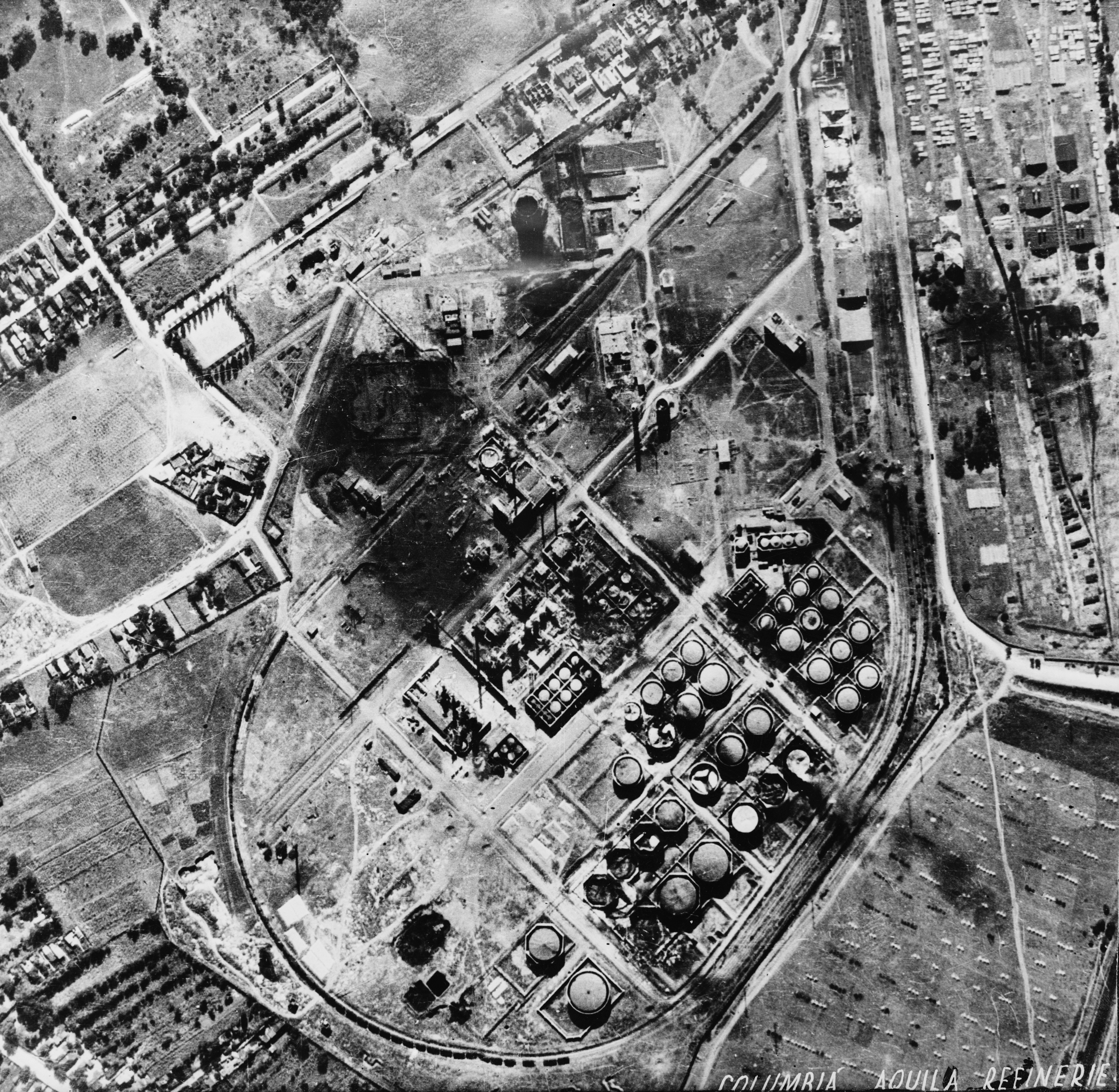
Columbia Aquila refinery after the bombing, with bomb craters, largely intact.

Only 88 B-24s returned to Libya, of which 55 had battle damage. Losses included 44 to air defenses and additional B-24s that ditched in the Mediterranean or were interned after landing in neutral Turkey. Some were diverted to the RAF airfield on Cyprus. One B-24 with 365 bullet holes in it landed in Libya 14 hours after departing; its survival was due to the light armament of the Bulgarian Avia B-534 (only four 7.92 mm machine guns).

For the Americans, 310 air crewmen were killed or missing, (Note: 216 of the deceased airmen were recovered by the Romanian Government of whom only 27 could be identified; the remainder were buried as Unknowns in the Hero Section of the Civilian and Military Cemetery of Bolovani, Ploiești, Prahova, Romania. As of 2023, 52 unknown airmen have been identified.) 108 were captured by the Axis, 78 were interned in Turkey, and four were taken in by partisans in Yugoslavia. Three of the five Medals of Honor (the most for any single air action in history) were awarded posthumously. For their leadership and heroism, Kane and Johnson were awarded the Medal of Honor. Additionally, 56 Distinguished Service Crosses and 41 Silver Stars for valor were awarded.

The Allies estimated a loss of 40% of the refining capacity at the Ploiești refineries although some refineries were largely untouched. Most of the damage was repaired within weeks, after which the net output of fuel was greater than before the raid. On 3 August, a de Havilland Mosquito of the South African Air Force 60 Squadron flew a high level - 27,000 ft (8,200 m) - photo-reconnaissance mission to Ploiești to record the results of Tidal Wave. The long distance meant only some of the area could be photographed and a second flight on 19 August photographed the remaining area.

Circa September, the Enemy Oil Committee appraisal of Ploiești bomb damage indicated "...no curtailment of overall product output..." because many of the refineries had been operating below maximum capacity. Out of all the bombed refineries, only the Creditul Minier refinery and the Columbia Aquila restarted production in late 1944, (Note: October and August 1944, respectively) while Steaua Română partially restarted production from January 1944.

The Royal Romanian Air Force carried out 59 sorties during Tidal Wave, and the Luftwaffe, 89. The Americans lost 53 Liberators (including those that landed in Turkey and were interned) and 55 more were damaged. The Romanians claimed 20 confirmed or probable air victories for the loss of one IAR 80B and one Bf 110, plus 15 more claimed by Romanian AA guns. Even if optimistic, the Romanian claims compared favorably with the American sevenfold-plus exaggerations during Tidal Wave and subsequent raids. The system of air victory confirmations of the Royal Romanian Air Force was stricter than that of the Luftwaffe at the time of the raid. Luftwaffe losses amounted to five aircraft. Another 11 fighters were damaged (two Romanian and nine German), and 19 military personnel were killed, with another 97 injured. The American Ninth Air Force was expelled from the theatre.

Through emergency bomb drops on secondary targets, there were casualties at Drenta, Elena, Byala, Ruse, Boychinovtsi, Veliko Tarnovo, Plovdiv, Lom, and Oak-Tulovo.

Although initially classified as a success by the Allies, reports gathered in the following months after Tidal Wave showed that the refining capacity of Ploiești was only marginally reduced, with the output quickly rising back in September. Furthermore, the large number of destroyed or damaged bombers had reduced the strength of IX Bomber Command to only 33 available B-24s, making it impossible to conduct follow-up raids on Romania as previously planned.

After the raid, Marshal Ion Antonescu, the Romanian dictator, visited Ploiești and Câmpina. Following this visit, it was decided to form a Special Intervention Corps with the task of responding to attacked areas and reducing the damage caused in future raids. Other passive defense measures were taken, such as forming new camouflaging units based on the German model, while the air defenses of the region were also improved.

General Dwight D. Eisenhower and other commanders were persuaded to continue the air campaign targeting Romania's oil production after Tidal Wave. The objective was set to lower the production by 60–70%. As part of the plan for the Completion of the Combined Bomber Offensive proposed by the commander of Strategic Air Forces in Europe, General Carl Spaatz, the raids restarted in April 1944. The US Fifteenth Air Force was now based in Italy much closer to the targets and fighters could cover the bombers. However Eisenhower thought the predicted necessary six months of attacks was too long to take effect and the combined Allied strategic bomber force was directed to attacking the rail infrastructure across occupied France in preparation for the invasion of France. From May 1944, oil targets became the priority again and several air attacks were conducted on the Romanian refineries until August 1944, when the 1944 Romanian coup d'état led to Romania changing sides. By the end of the Allied air campaign on 19 August 1944, the Allied air forces had lost 324 aircraft. The Royal Romanian Air Force and Romanian flak shot down 223 American and British bombers as well as 36 fighters. Romanian losses amounted to over 80 aircraft. Luftwaffe pilots shot down 66 more Western Allied aircraft. Total Western Allied casualties amounted to 1,500 captured and 1,706 killed.

== In fiction ==
The plot of the 1966 science fiction novel The Gate of Time by Philip José Farmer begins in Operation Tidal Wave, where the book's protagonist is one of the many pilots shot down over Ploiești. While parachuting, he feels a curious dizziness, and when landing, he finds himself not in Romania but in a very strange alternative history world, where the rest of the plot takes place.

== See also ==
- Bombing of Romania in World War II
- Operation Tidal Wave II, a US-led military operation against Islamic State's oil infrastructure named after the failed WW2 operation.

== Bibliography ==
- Axworthy, Mark; Scafeș, Cornel; Crăciunoiu, Cristian (1995). Third Axis, Fourth Ally: Romanian Armed Forces in the European War, 1941–1945. London: Arms and Armour. ISBN 1854092677.
- Jablonski, Edward (1971). Airwar Volume II: Tragic Victories. Airpower.
- Dugan, James; Stewart, Carroll (2002). Ploesti: The Great Ground-Air Battle of 1 August 1943. Brassey's. ISBN 978-1574885101.
- Schultz, Duane (2007). Into The Fire (1st / ed.). Yardley, PA: Westholme Publishing. ISBN 978-1594160516.
- Stout, Jay A (November 2003). Fortress Ploesti: The Campaign to Destroy Hitler's Oil Supply. p. 318. Archived from the original on 2010-06-22.
- Zaloga, Steven J. (2019). Ploesti 1943: The great raid on Hitler's Romanian oil refineries. Air Campaign No.12. Oxford: Osprey Publishing. ISBN 9781472831965.
- United States Air Force Historical Study No. 103, The Ploesti Mission of 1 Aug 1943 (PDF), Historical Division, June 1944, Army Air Forces Reference History No. 3 (AAFRH-3)
