= Vega Refinery =

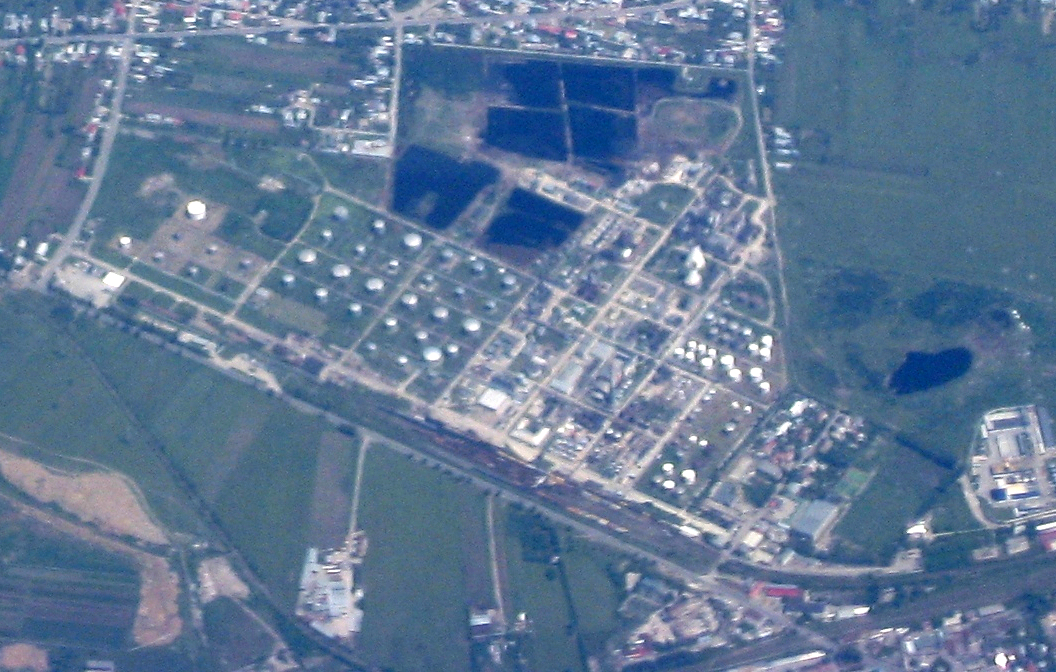
- Aerial view of the refinery in 2009
- Interactive map of the Vega Refinery area

General information
- Type: Oil refinery
- Location: Ploiești, Prahova County
- Coordinates: 44°57′47.9″N 26°1′26.7″E
- Construction started: May 1905
- Completed: 1 December 1905; 120 years ago
- Owner: Rompetrol

Vega Refinery is a Romanian oil refinery owned by Rompetrol and located in Ploiești, Prahova County. The refinery has a processing capacity of over 350,000 tons of feedstock/year. It is also the sole producer of hexane and bitumen in Romania with a production capacity of 66,000 tons of bitumen per year.

== History ==
=== Origins ===
On 5 January 1905, the Vega Society was established by the German bank Disconto-Gesellschaft together with French investors. The bank had been interested in the Romanian oil industry since 1899, when it founded the Internaționala Română society in the Netherlands. In 1904, the same bank formed the oil transport society Creditul Petrolifer which built an extensive oil pipeline network in the Telega region.

The construction of the refinery began in May 1905, under the leadership of the administration council presided over by Titu Maiorescu. The refinery, located near the Ploiești–Vălenii de Munte rail line, was finished on 1 December 1905 and began production on 26 February 1906. It had an area of around 50 hectares (120 acres) and a processing capacity of 200,000 tons of crude oil per year. The transport of crude oil was initially done by carts and 300 tank wagons of which 246 were owned by Creditul Petrolifer. By 1935, the society operated some 1,200 tank wagons, as well as four locomotives, and 421 railway lines.

The refinery, with its automatic installations and electric pumps, could process 120 crude oil wagons per day and produce a variety of oil products, such as lubricating oils and asphalt. From 1908, while Lazăr Edeleanu was the director of the refinery, he developed a new method of oil refining, called the Edeleanu process.

=== First World War and interwar period ===
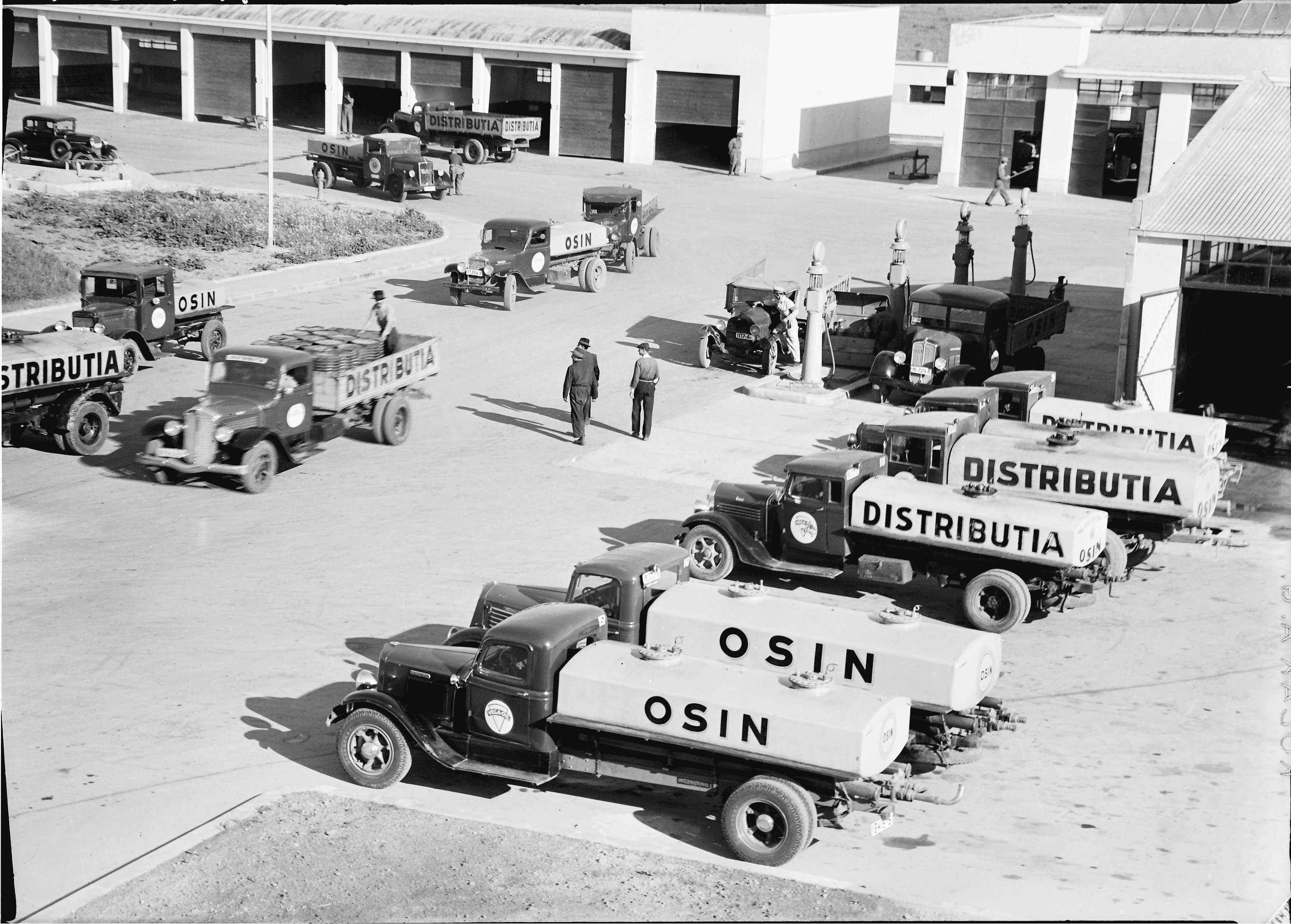
Vega oil tanker trucks of the OSIN/Distribuția company in 1937

During World War I, with the advance of the Central Powers armies into Romania in November 1916, the majority of oil wells in Romania were destroyed as a precautionary measure as to not fall into enemy hands. A commission formed by several British officers and led by British Lieutenant-Colonel John Norton-Griffiths, together with Prince George Valentin Bibescu and several Romanian engineers conducted the plan on 5 December. While the damage sustained by Vega was significant, the refinery was not fully destroyed, which prompted the Germans to restart production in March 1917.

After the war, the German-owned companies were taken by the Romanian state. At the insistence of other international companies, Vega and Creditul Petrolifer were taken over by the Belgian Petrofina company, while Concordia (another company previously owned by Disconto-Gesellschaft) was taken by the French Compagnie Française des Pétroles. In 1922, the Vega refinery came into the possession of Concordia after the company was merged with the Vega and Creditul Petrolifer under the Franco-Belgian Petrofina trust led by Léon Wenger. During the interwar period, Vega was ranked second among the Romanian refineries, after Astra Română.

=== Second World War ===
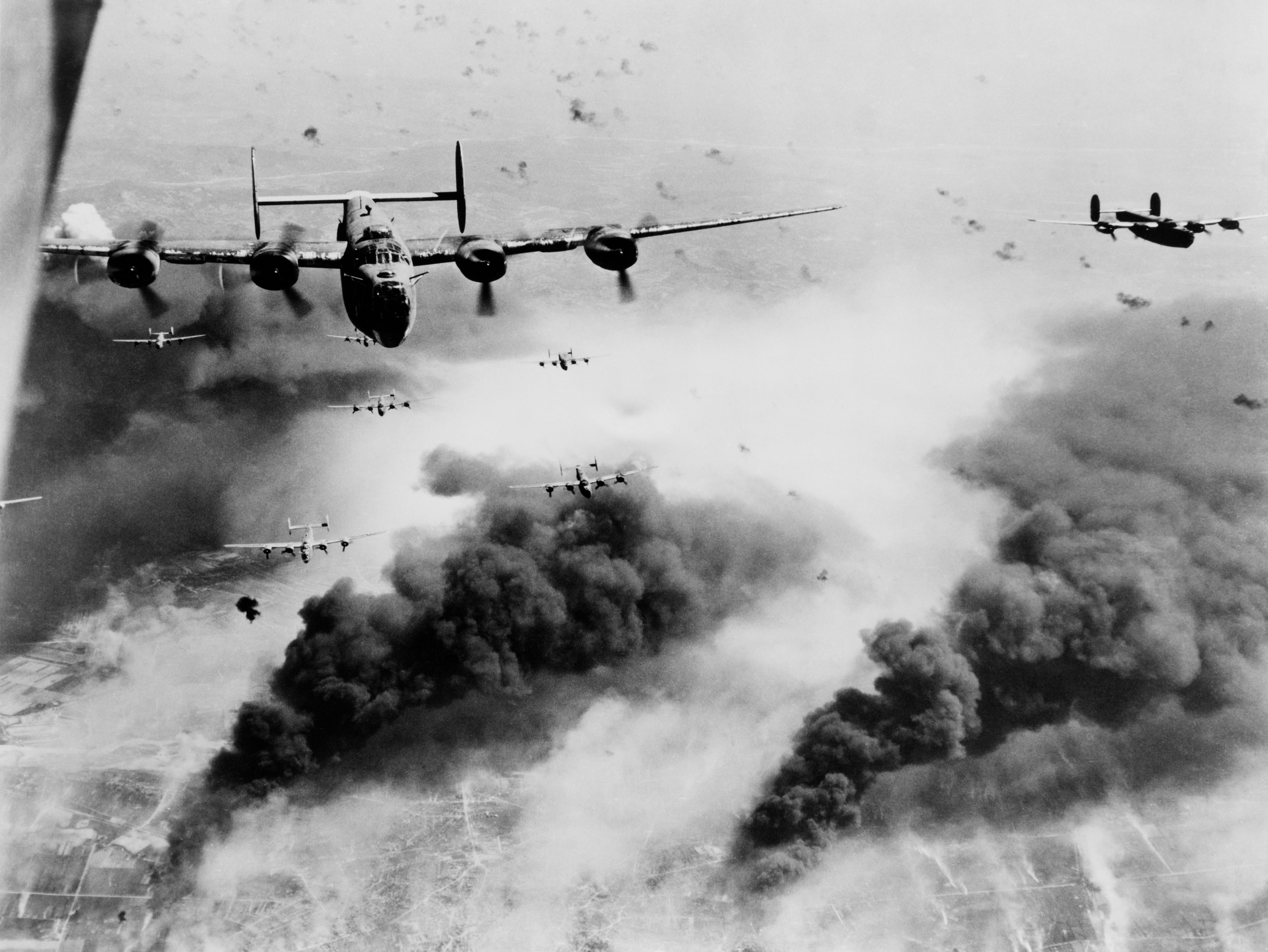
USAAF B-24 bombers attacking the refinery on 31 May 1944

After the start of World War II, Concordia was placed under military jurisdiction on 11 December 1940, and until 1945 it was controlled by the General Staff and the Ministry of Endowment of the Army and War Production. Also in 1940, a Mobilization and Passive Defense Service was established with the role of camouflaging the refinery and constructing bomb shelters for the workers. Brick walls were also erected around tanks, and walls up to 10 m high were built for protection. With Romania's entry into the war, the Vega refinery was first bombed on 18 July 1941 by Soviet bombers. Only one oil tank was set on fire, while the anti-aircraft artillery shot down one bomber.

With America's declaration of war on Romania in 1942, and with the arrival of the Halverson Detachment equipped with B-24 bombers in Egypt, the refineries from Ploiești were targeted once again. Vega did not sustain any damage on the 12 June 1942 raid. Designated as target White 2 for the low-level raid code-named Operation Tidal Wave, the refinery was attacked on 1 August 1943 by the 376th and 93d Bomb Groups. In the aftermath of the raid, damage sustained by Vega amounted to just 15%, which was quickly repaired and the refinery increased its production by September.

Between April and August 1944, the Vega refinery was attacked several times. It suffered heavy damage in the 31 May raid, and by the end of the war damage caused to the refinery amounted to about 442 million lei with almost 90% of the refinery being affected. The four main oil processing installations did not suffer significant damage however.

=== Post-war to modern day ===
The damages suffered during the war were fully repaired by 1948. In the same year, the Concordia society was nationalized and the refinery was transferred to the state, being renamed Refinery No. 2. Between 1949 and 1955, the refinery was under the control of the Sovrompetrol. Once it was transferred back to the state, the refinery was modernized and by 1981 it could manufacture petroleum solvents for the chemical and petrochemical industry, as well as detergents, petroleum jelly, and special bitumens.

In 1990, after the revolution, the Vega Refinery became a joint-stock company. The company was privatized in 1998, and the majority stake was purchased by Rompetrol in 1999. Following a $7 million investment, a processing unit of polymer-modified road bitumen was finished in 2007. In 2014, a record 61.400 tons of bitumen and 64.000 tons of n-hexane were produced.

Currently, the Vega refinery is the only producer of bitumen in Romania, and the only producer of n-hexane in Central and Eastern Europe.

== See also ==
- Petrotel Lukoil Refinery
- Petrobrazi Refinery
