= Grupul 6 Vânătoare =

6th Fighter Group
- Grupul 6 Vânătoare
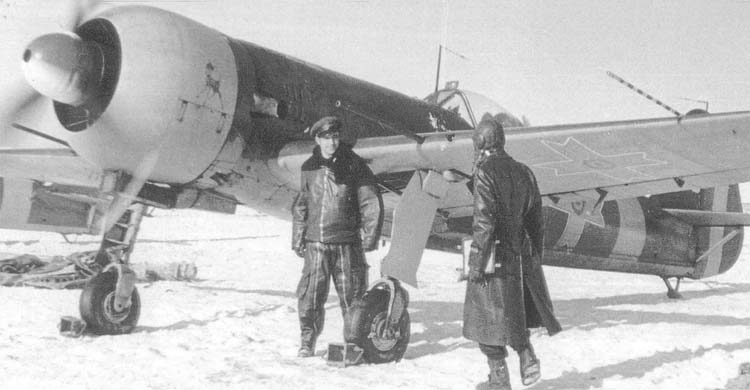
- IAR 81C of the 6th Fighter Group at the Popești-Leordeni airfield, January 1944 (Note: Aircraft is IAR 81C no. 323 of Escadrila 61 Vânătoare flown by Lt. Dumitru Baciu. Note Baciu's personal Bambi emblem painted on the engine cowling.)
- Active: 7 June 1940 – October 1944
- Country: Romania
- Branch: Royal Romanian Air Force
- Type: Group
- Role: Fighter
- Equipment: PZL P.24E; IAR 80/81
- Engagements: Second World War: Eastern Front; Battle of Stalingrad; Western Allied campaign in Romania; Operation Tidal Wave

Commanders
- Notable commanders: Captain Dan Vizanty

Grupul 6 Vânătoare ("6th Fighter Group" in English) was a fighter group of the Royal Romanian Air Force (ARR) formed on 7 June 1940. The group participated in the World War 2 campaign of Romania on the Eastern Front and in the defense of the country against the Western Allied bombing raids. The group was disbanded in October 1944 as its pilots were transferred to Grupul 1 Vânătoare after converting to the Bf 109 from the IAR 81.

== History ==
The 6th Fighter Group was established on 7 June 1940, consisting of the 62nd and 63rd fighter squadrons and equipped with the PZL P.24E fighters. It was assigned to the 2nd Fighter Flotilla. In June 1941, the 6th Group was assigned to the 3rd Air Region and based on the Pipera airfield. In the starting days of Operation Barbarossa, it flew mainly interception missions against Soviet bombers attacking Ploiești and Bucharest.

As its presence was no longer needed in the country due to the Soviet bombers being pushed outside of the range of the Ploiești oil fields, the 6th Group was sent on the frontline when Romanian Fourth Army began the Siege of Odessa. During the 1941 campaign, fighter pilots of the group claimed 11 Soviet aircraft shot down of which five were confirmed. A further six aircraft were destroyed on the ground, while the group lost three PZL fighters.

=== On the Eastern Front ===
In 1942, the unit returned to Pipera where it transitioned from the PZL to the IAR 81 dive bomber, also being designated as a dive bomber group ("BoPi" – Bombardament în Picaj). On 31 August 1942, the group, assigned to the 2nd Fighter Flotilla, with the 61st and 62nd squadrons was transferred to the front. In formations of eight aircraft, they departed to Odesa, then to Melitopol, and finally reached Tusov airfield near Stalingrad on 7 September. Two days later, the first sorties were flown.

As part of the Romanian Gruparea Aerienă de Luptă (Air Combat Group), working closely with units of Luftflotte 4, the group flew on escort missions, often clashing with Soviet Yaks, while also engaging Soviet bombers. By 1 October, there were 25 IAR 81s in the inventory of the 6th Group. The group was moved to the Morozovskaya airfield and starting in November the dive bombers began flying on ground attack and reconnaissance missions. As the 8th Fighter Group was preparing to return home, some of its pilots were transferred to Grupul 6. On 7 December, while on an escort in misty weather, Adjutant (Adj.) Gheorghe Pisoschi encountered three Yaks which he attacked by surprise. Damaging one of them, the Yak collided with another, exploding and crashing in flames.

As the number of serviceable aircraft dropped, replacements were transferred from Grupul 8 which departed for Romania on 9 December. Following this reorganization, the 61st Fighter Squadron received IAR 80A and 80B aircraft, while all remaining IAR 81s were assigned to the 62nd Fighter Squadron. On 23 December, Grupul 6 was moved to the Tatsinskaya airfield. On 2 January 1943, it was moved to Rostov then it further retreated to Melitopol, where it entered a refit period.

In the 1942 campaign, Grupul 6 Vânătoare flew on 255 missions of which 30 dive bombing missions, and claimed 28 victories of which 26 confirmed. Losses amounted to eight aircraft in dogfights and three shot down by the anti-aircraft defense.

=== Back to home defense ===
In February 1943, the group began moving to the Târgșoru airfield where it was assigned to the air defense system of the Prahova Valley. The group was later moved to the Pipera airfield. On 1 August, the USAAF launched Operation Tidal Wave, a low-level raid on the Ploiești refineries. The large bomber formation was detected by German radar as it was approaching Romania. At 11:18 AM, the fighter units defending the region were alerted and 12 fighters of the 6th Fighter Group were scrambled to patrol the north side of Bucharest. As the bombers were passing the Danube, radar contact was lost. Since the bombers were expected to continue at high altitude, the German and Romanian fighters were directed to 5,000 m (16,000 ft), and due to the cloud cover the fighters did not spot the low-flying bomber formations.

The first bombers were detected from the ground at 11:45, and the fighters were directed to low altitude to engage. At 11:50, Grupul 6 made the first contact with Col. Keith K. Compton's 376th Bombardment Group near Săbăreni, northwest of Bucharest. The IAR 80s attempted to engage, but interception proved difficult as the 376th Group was turning towards Ploiești. They did, however, manage to attack the trailing 93rd Bombardment Group. Sublocotenent (Slt.) Carol Anastasescu shot down two B-24 bombers, one of which crashed into the Ploiești Women's Prison. Anastasescu's IAR 80B was also set on fire and, while attempting to bail out, the aircraft collided with the propeller of a B-24. He was thrown clear of the IAR and survived the crash. By the end of the raid, the 6th Group claimed five bombers of which two were probable. Besides Slt. Anastasescu's airplane which was destroyed, the IAR of Adj. Gheorghe Cocebaș was also damaged.

The air raid, though a failure for the USAAF, proved that the IAR 80B's two 13.2 mm machine guns were not powerful enough to reliably take down heavy bombers. Expecting future raids, General Gheorghe Jienescu decided to restructure the fighter defenses. On this occasion, Captain Dan Vizanty was appointed as the new group commander, and a new squadron, the 59th Fighter Squadron, was assigned to the Group. By the end of November 1943, all three squadrons of Grupul 6 were relocated to the Popești-Leordeni airfield, being also equipped with the new IAR 81C, which were armed with two 20 mm MG 151 cannons.

==== 1944 campaign ====
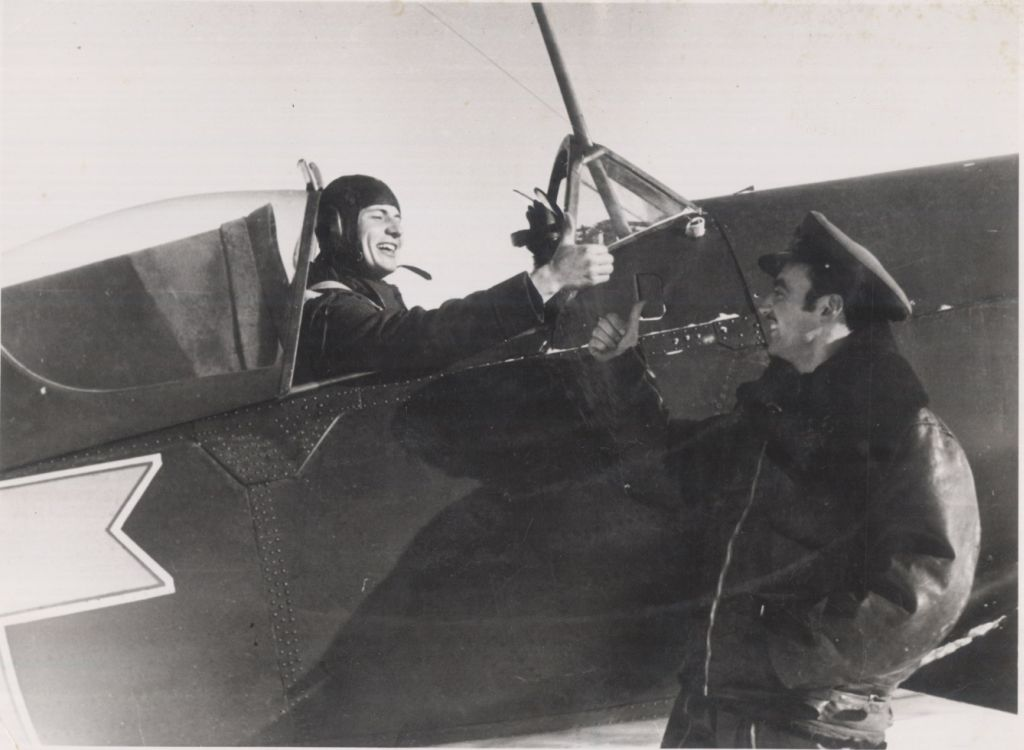
Eugen Ianculescu (in the pilot seat) and Dumitru Baciu on the Popești-Leordeni airfield, January 1944

The American raids restarted on 4 April 1944. On the first day, the IAR 81Cs of the group took off to intercept the unescorted B-24s of the Fifteenth Air Force over Bucharest. Eight bombers were claimed while three IARs were damaged. On 21 April, B-24 and B-17 bombers targeted the marshalling yards of Bucharest. The IARs of Grupul 1, Grupul 2 and Grupul 6 took off to intercept, however, as they were attempting to engage the bombers they were attacked by P-51 Mustangs of the 31st Fighter Group. The new American P-51Bs outperformed the IARs at high altitude, and the US fighter pilots destroyed 14 Romanian aircraft, four of which were from the 6th Fighter Group. The Romanians claimed 11 victories during the mission, while the Americans reported only 10 airplanes lost.

On 24 April, the IARs scrambled again to engage a bomber formation at around 7,000 m (23,000 ft) which was heading to Ploiești. As the US escort fighters left the bombers alone when the anti-aircraft artillery started firing, the IARs took the opportunity and engaged the bombers. Though a dangerous move, as the ground fire targeted everything that was flying, the IARs downed six bombers of which three were confirmed without suffering any losses. Between 4 April and 6 June, the 6th Fighter Group flew 363 sorties, claiming 60 victories and another 10 probable victories, for the loss of seven pilots.

On 10 June 1944, the USAAF attempted another surprise low-altitude raid over Ploiești with P-38 Lightnings. The Lightnings of the 82nd Fighter Group were to perform a dive bombing attack on the Româno-Americană refinery, and the 1st Fighter Group provided cover, while also engaging targets of opportunity. As they were entering Romania, the heavy fighters were detected by Würzburg and Freya radars, and the IAR 81s of Grupul 6 were notified to take off. Led by Captain Vizanty, the 23 IARs climbed to 2,500 m (8,200 ft). Soon after taking off, 12 P-38s of the 71st Fighter Squadron attacked the airfield and shot down several training airplanes that were attempting to take off. Notified by the Luftwaffe "Tiger" command from Otopeni, Vizanty's IARs dove on the unsuspecting "two feathered Indians" over the airfield. In the ensuing low altitude dogfight, the Americans lost eight P-38s, while the Romanians lost three IARs (although both overestimated their victories, with the Romanians claiming 24 P-38s shot down, while the Americans reported 23 "Focke-Wulf Fw 190s" shot down).

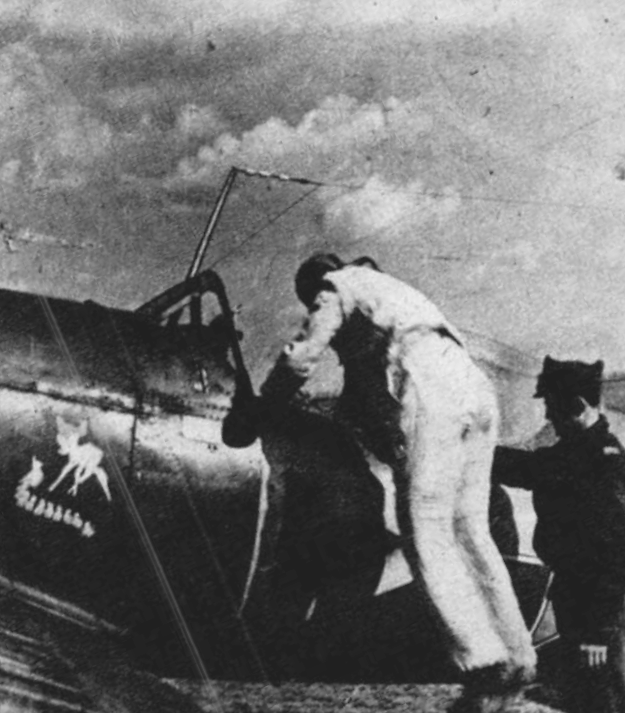
IAR 81C of Escadrila 61 Vânătoare after a mission (Note: The Bambi emblem of the squadron is painted on the fuselage of the aircraft)

The IARs continued to engage US aircraft until 20 July, when the fighters were prohibited from engaging the Americans due to mounting losses. Instead, the IAR groups were redirected to fight the Soviets and the role of home defense was taken by Grupul 7 and Grupul 9 which were equipped with the Bf 109G. After the 23 August 1944 coup, the 6th Fighter Group was moved to the Turnișor airfield in Transylvania to aid the ground troops in the area. On 23 September, a group of eight IAR 81s from the 59th Fighter Squadron clashed with eight Fw-190s over Turda. Other Bf 109s from JG 52 and IARs joined the fight. By the end of the day, the 6th Group claimed four Luftwaffe airplanes, with two of them being confirmed, for the loss of two IARs. Due to the losses suffered in September, the IARs were relegated to ground support missions, while the fighter missions were taken over by the Bf 109s. The 6th Group transferred its aircraft to the 2nd Fighter Group. The group was then transferred to Târgșoru on 8 October for converting to the Bf 109.

Although there was an attempt to re-equip the IAR groups with Soviet Lavochkin La-5FNs and Yak-9s, the plan ultimately failed. A part of pilots from the 6th Group were eventually transferred to Grupul 1 Vânătoare, where they flew on Bf 109s for the rest of the war.

== Organization 1941–1944 ==
The 6th Fighter Group had the following squadrons between 1941 and 1944:

- 58th Fighter Squadron (non-permanent)
- 59th Fighter Squadron
- 60th Fighter Squadron
- 61st Fighter Squadron
- 62nd Fighter Squadron

== Bibliography ==
- Bernád, Dénes (20 June 2003). Rumanian Aces of World War 2. Osprey Publishing. ISBN 978-1-84176-535-8.
- Moroșanu, Teodor Liviu; Melinte, Dan (30 November 2010). Romanian Fighter Colors 1941-1945. MMPBooks. ISBN 978-83-89450-90-6.
- Zaloga, Steven J. (2019). Ploesti 1943: The great raid on Hitler's Romanian oil refineries. Oxford: Osprey Publishing. ISBN 9781472831965.
