= Petrochemical industry in Romania =

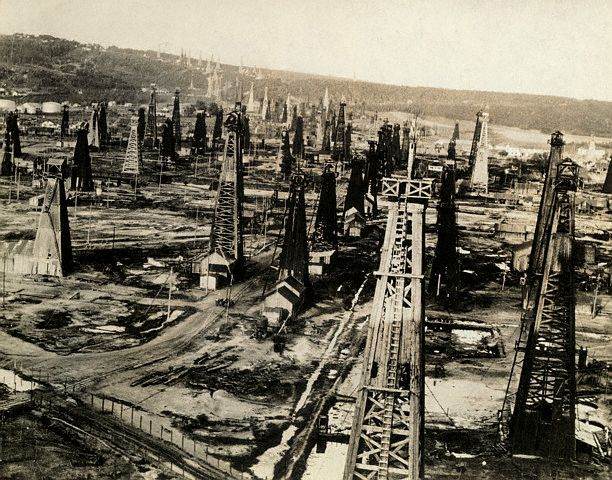
Petroleum field at Moreni, Romania (1920)

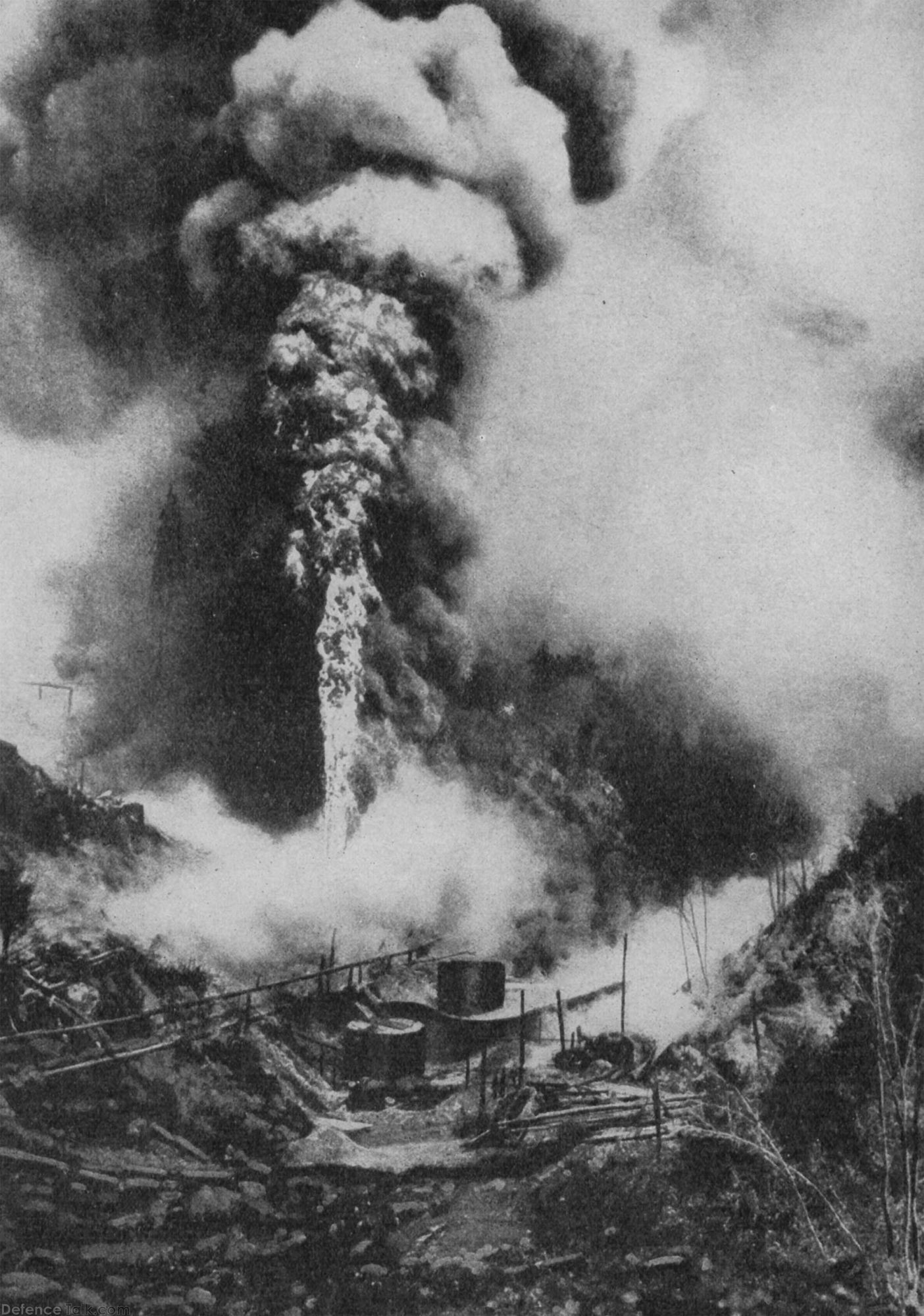
During World War I Romanian wells were destroyed as the German–Austrian–Bulgarian armies advanced

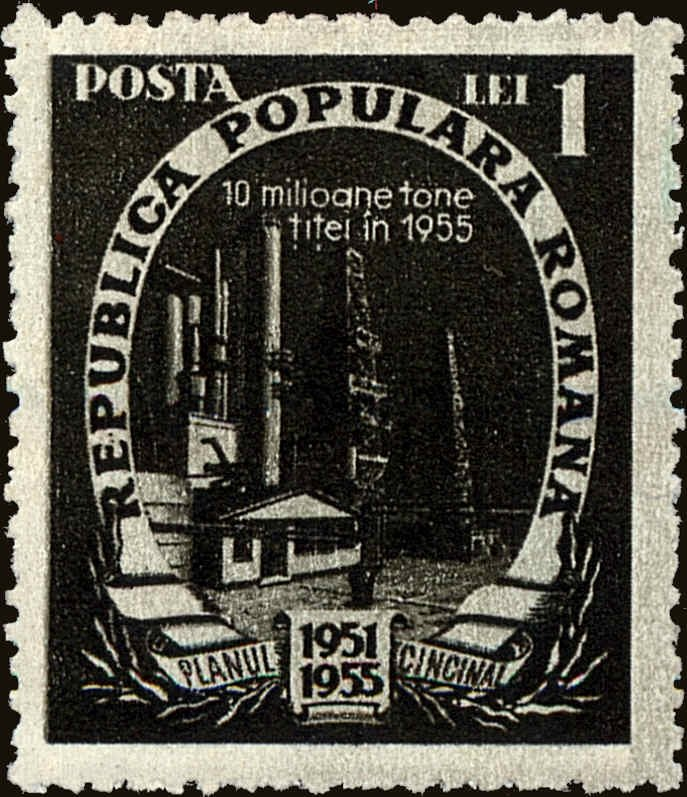
Five-Year Plan, 1951–1955: Oil production (Stamp of Romania)

The emergence of oil production in the territory now known as Romania dates back to 1857, with oil facilities gaining strategic military significance in 1916 during World War I. Throughout World War II, the Kingdom of Romania held the position as the largest oil producer in Europe, second only to the USSR, whose primary oil source was located in Azerbaijan. The oil extracted from Romania played a pivotal role in Axis military operations, a fact underscored in Adolf Hitler's 1942 conversation with Gustaf Emil Mannerheim.

The Romanian petrochemical industry, particularly centered around Ploiești, became a focal point for Allied bombing raids, notably during Operation Tidal Wave. The Soviet Red Army later occupied the Romanian oilfields in August 1944. Post-World War II, extensive reconstruction and expansion initiatives were undertaken under the communist regime. Following the events of 1989, a significant portion of the industry underwent privatization.

Present-day Romania boasts significant oil-refining capabilities, demonstrating a notable interest in the Central Asia-Europe pipelines while actively cultivating relations with select Arab states in the Persian Gulf. With a total of 10 refineries and an overall refining capacity of approximately 504,000 barrels per day (80,100 cubic meters per day), Romania stands as the leading nation in the eastern European region in terms of refining industry scale.

Romania's extensive refining capacity surpasses its domestic demand for refined petroleum products, enabling the country to engage in substantial exports of various oil products and petrochemicals. This includes, but is not limited to, lubricants, bitumen, and fertilizers, distributed across the eastern European region.

By 2017, the number of refineries possessing the capability to produce had dwindled to just five, with the overall capacity experiencing a decline to 13.7 million metric tons per year.

== Refineries ==
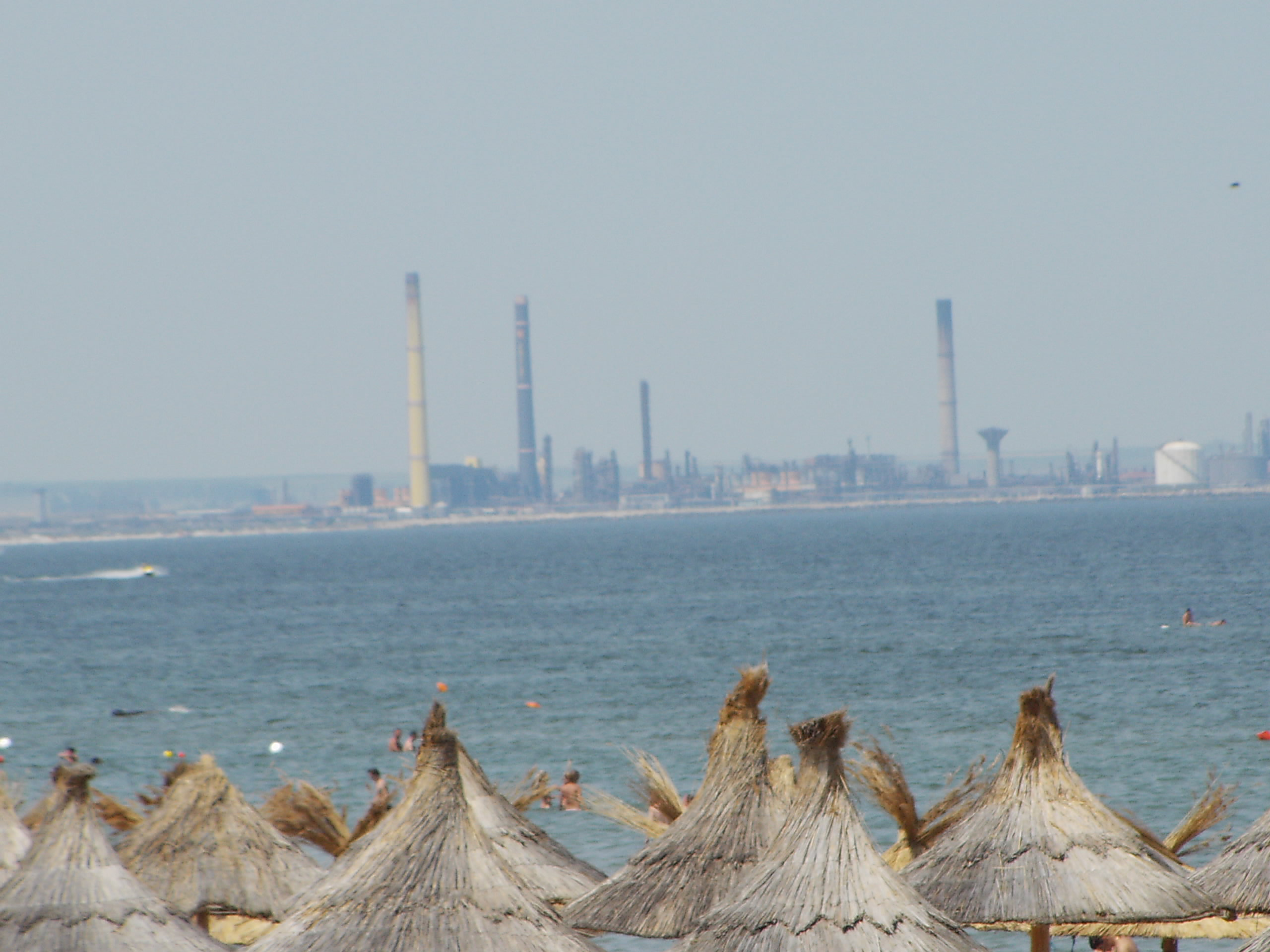
"Petromidia" refinery in Năvodari

This is an incomplete list of oil refineries in Romania:

- Petrobrazi Refinery, (Petrom/OMV), 90,000 bbl/d (14,000 m^{3}/d)
- Petrotel Lukoil Refinery (LUKOIL), 68,000 bbl/d (10,800 m^{3}/d)
- Petromidia Constanța Refinery (Rompetrol), 100,000 bbl/d (16,000 m^{3}/d)
- Vega Refinery (Rompetrol), 20,000 bbl/d (3,200 m^{3}/d)
- Petrolsub Suplacu de Barcău Refinery, (Petrom/OMV), 15,000 bbl/d (2,400 m^{3}/d)

Dormant refineries:

- Astra Refinery, (Interagro), 20,000 bbl/d (3,200 m^{3}/d)
- Steaua Română Câmpina Refinery, (Omnimpex Chemicals), 15,000 bbl/d (2,400 m^{3}/d)

Closed refineries:

- Arpechim Refinery, (Petrom/OMV), which used to process 70,000 bbl/d (11,000 m^{3}/d)
- RAFO Onești Refinery, (Calder A), which used to process 70,000 bbl/d (11,000 m^{3}/d)

== Petrochemical processing platforms ==
Romania has closed down the majority of the petrochemical processing platforms. Those remaining are:

- KazMunayGas: Petromidia
- Chimcomplex
- Oltchim

== See also ==
- Oil campaign of World War II
- Economy of Romania
- Industry of Romania
- Operation Tidal Wave
