= WFCU =

WFCU may refer to:

- WFCU Centre, a sports-entertainment centre in Windsor, Ontario
- Windsor Family Credit Union, a credit union in Windsor, Ontario
- Wings Financial Credit Union, a credit union based in Minnesota
