= Jagdfliegerführer Rumänien =

Jagdfliegerführer Rumänien (Note: A Jagdfliegerführer, or Jafü, was the commander of the Fighter forces of a Luftflotte. For more details see Luftwaffe Organization) was formed July 1943 in Otopeni (Bucharest), Romania subordinated to Luftflotte 4. The headquarters was located at Otopeni, and from August 1944 in Budak. The unit was disbanded on 4 September 1944.

The unit was known as Jagdfliegerführer Rumänien until 7 February 1944, when it was redesignated Jagdfliegerführer Balkan. It then was reformed on 7 February 1944 as Jagdabschnittsführer Rumänien. Stab/Jafü Rumänien used Bü 131 and Fi 156 aircraft.

== Commanding officers ==
- Oberstleutnant Bernhard Woldenga, July 1943 - February 1944
- Oberstleutnant Eduard Neumann, February 1944 - August 1944

== Organization ==
=== 31 August 1943 ===
- I./JG 4 (Mizil)
- IV./NJG 6 (Ziliștea)

=== 10 November 1943 ===
- I./JG 4 (Mizil)
- 10./JG 301 (Mizil)
- III./JG 77 (Mizil)
- IV./NJG 6 (Ziliștea)

=== 3 April 1944 ===
- II./JG 77 (Mizil)
- IV./NJG 6 (Ziliștea)
  - 10./NJG 6 (Otopeni)
  - 11./NJG 6 (Ziliștea)
- 2./NJG 100 (Focșani, Ziliștea, and Otopeni)
- 10./JG 301 (Otopeni)
- (rum) I. JGr. (Grupul 1 Vânătoare - Roșiori)
- (rum) VI. JGr. (Grupul 6 Vânătoare - Popești-Leordeni)
- (rum) VII. JGr. (Grupul 7 Vânătoare - Pipera)
- (rum) 1. NJ.St. (Escadrila 1 Vânătoare de Noapte - Otopeni)
- II./JG 51 (Niš)
- (bulg) II./JG 6 (Vrashdebna)
- (bulg) III./JG 6 (Bozhurishte)

=== 25 May 1944 ===
- I./JG 53 (Târgșoru Nou)
- III./JG 77 (Mizil)
- IV./NJG 6 (Otopeni)
  - 11./NJG 6 (Ziliștea)
- 2./NJG 100 (Otopeni)
- 5./NJG 200 (Focșani)
- 6./JG 301 (Târgșoru Nou)
- 10./JG 301 (Târgșoru Nou)
- (rum) Jagdgeschwader 1 (Flotila 1 Vânătoare)
  - (rum) VII. JGr. (Grupul 7 Vânătoare - Pipera)
  - (rum) V. JGr. (Grupul 5 Vânătoare)
    - (rum) 51. Jagdstaffel (Escadrila 51 Vânătoare - Țepeș Vodă)
    - (rum) 52. Jagdstaffel (Escadrila 52 Vânătoare - Mamaia)
- (rum) Jagdgeschwader 2 (Flotila 2 Vânătoare)
  - (rum) I. JGr. (Grupul 1 Vânătoare - Roșiori)
  - (rum) VI. JGr. (Grupul 6 Vânătoare - Popești-Leordeni)
- (rum) 1. NJ.St. (Escadrila 1 Vânătoare de Noapte - Otopeni)

=== 26 July 1944 ===
- I./JG 53 (Târgșoru Nou)
- III./JG 77 (Mizil)
- IV./NJG 6 (Otopeni)
  - 11./NJG 6 (Ziliștea)
- 2./NJG 100 (Otopeni)
- 4./JG 301 (Mizil)
- 6./JG 301 (Târgșoru Nou)
- 10./JG 301 (Târgșoru Nou)
- (rum) Jagdgeschwader 1 (Flotila 1 Vânătoare)
  - (rum) V. JGr. (Grupul 5 Vânătoare)
    - (rum) 51. Jagdstaffel (Escadrila 51 Vânătoare - Țepeș Vodă)
    - (rum) 52. Jagdstaffel (Escadrila 52 Vânătoare - Mamaia)
- (rum) Jagdgeschwader 2 (Flotila 2 Vânătoare)
  - (rum) I. JGr. (Grupul 1 Vânătoare - Roșiori)
  - (rum) VI. JGr. (Grupul 6 Vânătoare - Popești-Leordeni)
- (rum) Jagdgeschwader 3 (Flotila 3 Vânătoare)
  - (rum) VII. JGr. (Grupul 7 Vânătoare - Boteni)
    - (rum) 58. Jagdstaffel (Escadrila 58 Vânătoare - Pipera)
- (rum) 1. NJ.St. (Escadrila 1 Vânătoare de Noapte - Otopeni)

=== 23 August 1944 ===
- I. and II./JG 301 (Târgșoru Nou)
  - 6./JG 301 (Meri)
  - 7./JG 301 (Mizil)
- IV./NJG 6 (Otopeni)
  - 10./NJG 6 (Otopeni)
  - 11./NJG 6 (Ziliștea)
- 2./NJG 100 (Roșiori, and Ziliștea)
- (rum) Jagdgeschwader 2 (Flotila 2 Vânătoare)
  - (rum) VI. JGr. (Grupul 6 Vânătoare - Popești-Leordeni)
- (rum) Jagdgeschwader 1 (Flotila 1 Vânătoare)
  - (rum) V. JGr. (Grupul 5 Vânătoare)
    - (rum) 51. Jagdstaffel (Escadrila 51 Vânătoare - Cocargeaua)
    - (rum) 52. Jagdstaffel (Escadrila 52 Vânătoare - Mamaia)
  - (rum) 58. Jagdstaffel (Escadrila 58 Vânătoare - Boteni)
- (rum) 1. NJ.St. (Escadrila 1 Vânătoare de Noapte - Otopeni)
