= Uzal Girard Ent =

US Army Air Forces general (1900–1948)

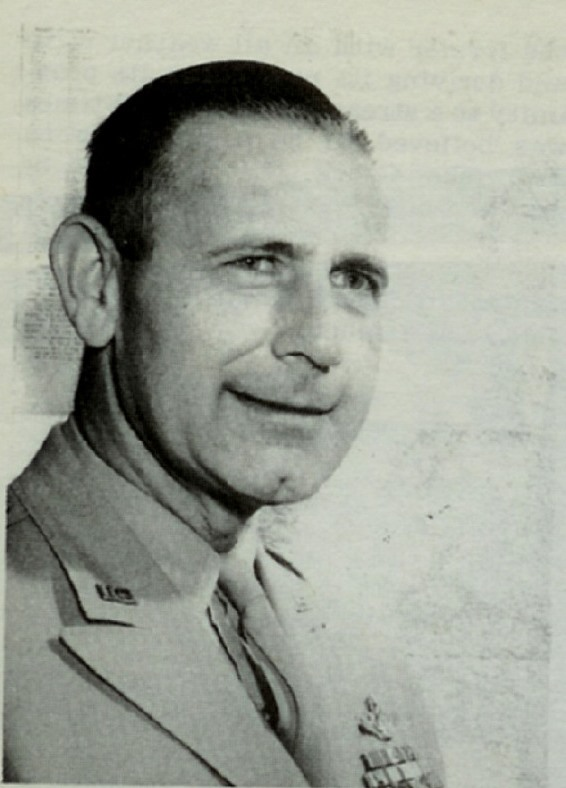
- Born: March 3, 1900; Northumberland, Pennsylvania, U.S.
- Died: March 5, 1948 (aged 48); Aurora, Colorado, U.S.
- Burial place: Riverview Cemetery; Northumberland, Pennsylvania, U.S.
- Military career
- Allegiance: United States
- Branch: United States Army Air Forces
- Service years: 1917–1946
- Rank: Major general
- Commands: IX Bomber Command; Second Air Force
- Conflicts: World War I World War II

Uzal Girard Ent CBE (March 3, 1900 – March 5, 1948) was an American Army Air Forces officer who served as the commander of the Second Air Force during World War II.

== Early life and education ==
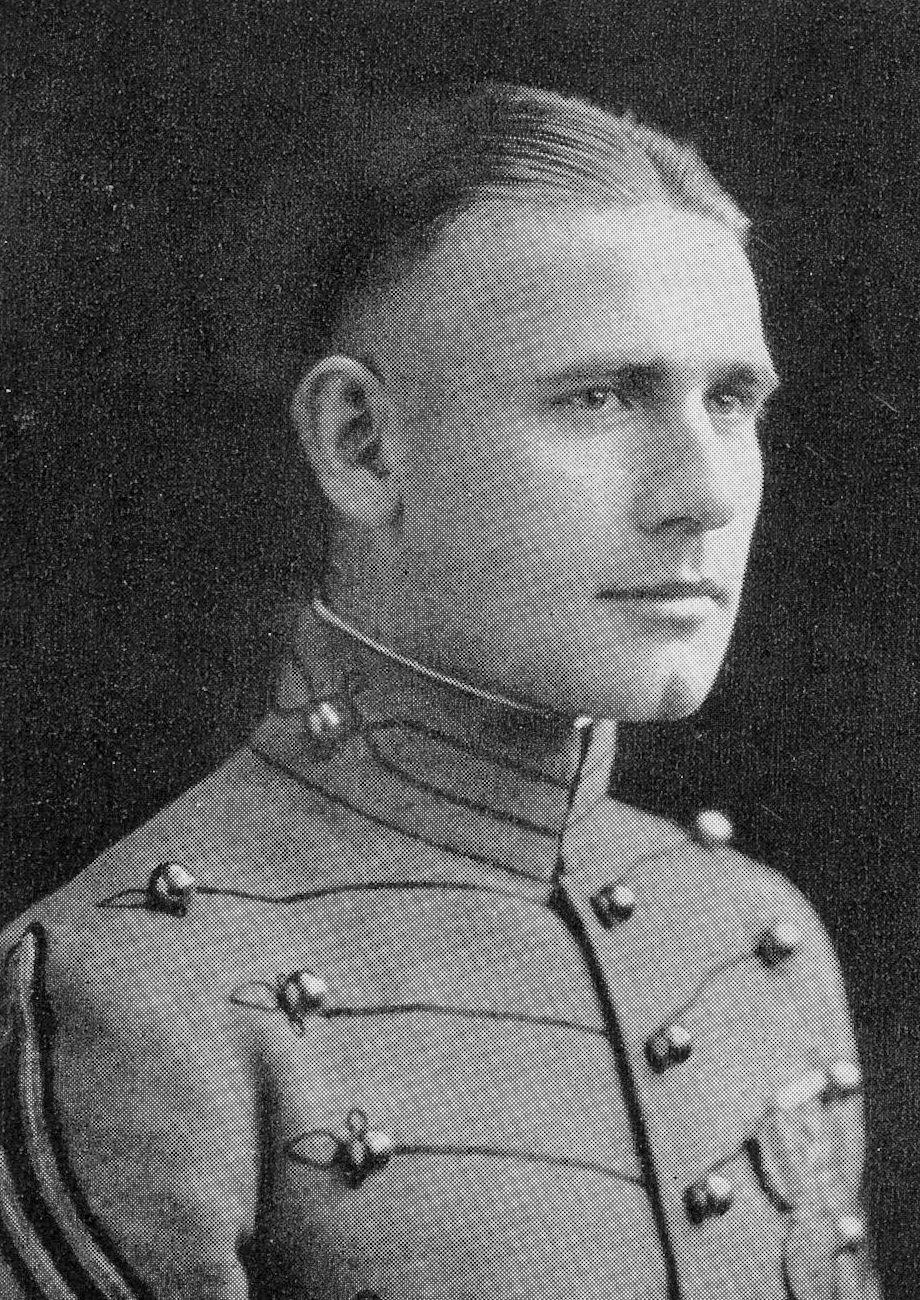
Ent at the United States Military Academy at West Point in 1924

Ent was born on March 3, 1900, in Northumberland, Pennsylvania. After attending grade school and high school in his hometown, he enrolled at Susquehanna University. During World War I, Ent left to enlist as a private in the infantry in 1917. He transferred to the Aviation Section of the Army Signal Corps and was promoted to sergeant in the 59th Balloon Company in March 1919. Ent received an appointment to West Point and was commissioned into the Army Air Service in June 1924.

== Career ==
On May 30, 1928, he was the co-pilot of a balloon in the National Balloon Race, starting at Bettis Field in Pittsburgh. During the race, Ent's balloon was struck by lightning over Youngstown, Pennsylvania. The lightning strike killed the pilot and set the balloon's hydrogen-filled envelope on fire. Ent could have parachuted to safety but chose to stay with the balloon, attempted to rescue the pilot, and successfully piloted the balloon to the ground. For this act of heroism, Ent was awarded the Distinguished Flying Cross later that year.

After graduating from the Air Corps Tactical School in June 1937 and the Command and General Staff School in June 1938, he served as a military attaché at the American Embassy in Lima, Peru from July 1939 until October 1942, acting as the senior neutral military observer on the Peruvian side after their boundary war with Ecuador.

He was chief of staff to the U.S. Army Forces in the Middle East from October 1942 until February 1943. He then served as Commanding General, 9th Bomber Command, 9th Air Force from February to December 1943. During his stint, he led 178 B-24s in "Operation Tidal Wave" – the bombing raid on the oil fields at Ploieşti, Romania, on August 1, 1943. He was then appointed Chief of Staff and then Commanding General, 2nd Air Force, based at Colorado Springs, Colorado. In September 1944, Ent selected Lieutenant Colonel Paul Tibbets to form and train an organization to drop atomic weapons from B-29 bombers. Given Tibbets and two other names by General Henry "Hap" Arnold, Ent replied without hesitation, "Paul Tibbets is the man to do it."

In October 1944, Ent was seriously injured in the crash of a B-25 on takeoff at the Fort Worth Army Airfield, Texas. Paralyzed from the waist down, he learned to walk again using braces. He retired for "disability in line of duty" in 1946, with the rank of major general. After his retirement from military service, he studied to have a career in law; he also experimented with materials to develop lightweight braces for paraplegics. He wrote a book, What's My Score?, to help victims of paralysis. He also volunteered for several experimental surgeries so surgeons could learn to better treat spinal injuries.

== Personal life ==
In 1927, he married Eleanor Marwitz; they would have a son, Girard.

== Death ==
He died at Fitzsimons General Hospital in Aurora, Colorado, on March 5, 1948, due to complications from the injuries he sustained in the plane crash. He was cremated and his ashes were scattered over the Riverview Cemetery in his hometown of Northumberland. A cenotaph honoring him now stands there.

== Awards and honors ==
=== United States ===
USAAF Command pilot badge
Distinguished Service Cross
Army Distinguished Service Medal with bronze oak leaf cluster
Legion of Merit
Distinguished Flying Cross with bronze oak leaf cluster
Air Medal with bronze oak leaf cluster
World War I Victory Medal
American Defense Service Medal with service star
American Campaign Medal
Asiatic-Pacific Campaign Medal
European–African–Middle Eastern Campaign Medal with three bronze campaign stars
World War II Victory Medal

- Cheney Award

=== Foreign ===
Order of the Condor of the Andes, degree unknown (Bolivia)
Peruvian Aviation Cross, 1st class (Peru)
Military Order of Ayacucho (Peru)
Commander of the Order of the British Empire (United Kingdom)

=== Other honors ===
In 1951, a new Air Force base near Colorado Springs, Colorado, was named in the general's honor. Ent Air Force Base was the initial home to the North American Air Defense Command (NORAD) from 1957 until 1963 when the command center moved to a highly secure facility within Cheyenne Mountain. Ent AFB became the Ent Annex to the Cheyenne Mountain Complex in 1975, and the facility was closed the following year.

The Ent Credit Union was named in his honor. Veterans of Foreign Wars (VFW) Post 8298 in Ent's hometown of Northumberland, Pennsylvania, is named "Major General Uzal G. Ent" to honor his memory.
