= Wings Credit Union (1938–2026) =

Non-profit credit union

- Type: Credit union Nonprofit
- Industry: Financial services
- Founded: St. Paul, Minnesota (1938)
- Founder: Group of seven Northwest Airlines
- Defunct: January 1, 2026; 10 months ago
- Fate: Merged with Ent Credit Union, which assumed the Wings Credit Union name.
- Successor: Wings Credit Union
- Headquarters: Apple Valley, Minnesota, United States
- Area served: U.S. Air Transportation Industry; Minneapolis/St. Paul, Minnesota, Orlando, Florida; Atlanta, Georgia
- Products: Savings; Checking; Consumer Loans; Mortgages; Credit Cards; Investments
- Total assets: US$8,400,000,000
- Members: 349,300
- Website: Official website

Wings Credit Union was an American credit union headquartered in Apple Valley, Minnesota. With assets of $8.4 billion, the credit union served eligible Minnesota and Wisconsin counties, the metro areas of Detroit, Orlando, Atlanta and employees in the air transportation industry nationwide. Wings was chartered in 1938 and was regulated by the National Credit Union Administration (NCUA).

== Company history ==
Wings Credit Union was founded in 1938 as the Northwest Airlines Employees Credit Union by a group of seven Northwest Airlines employees in St. Paul, Minnesota. The credit union grew slowly and steadily over its first few years. Significant growth began after World War II as Northwest Airlines expanded across the country and the Pacific. Between 1945 and 1949, the Credit Union grew nearly 500%, fueled by those returning from the war.

Subsequent years saw consistent growth from the credit union. The credit union passed $100 million in assets in 1984 and achieved $500 million in 1997. In August 2001, the credit union passed $1 billion in assets. In 2004, the credit union expanded beyond Northwest Airlines and opened its doors to other employees in the air transportation industry in the United States. To reflect a changing membership, the name of the credit union was changed to Wings Financial Federal Credit Union.

In August 2009, members of Wings Financial voted to become a state-chartered credit union, extending membership to thirteen counties in the Minneapolis-Saint Paul area.

In 2010, Wings announced a merger with City-County Federal Credit Union of Minneapolis, doubling the number of branches it operated in the Minneapolis-St. Paul area and increasing its membership by 50%. The merger was finalized in 2011.

In 2014, Wings began a partnership with the Minnesota Zoo. As a part of this partnership, Wings was the namesake sponsor of the Wings Financial world of Birds Show.

In 2018, Wings purchased three branches of KleinBank. 4,500 KleinBank customers became Wings members.

In 2021, Wings acquired Brainerd Savings & Loan which expanded the credit union's footprint into the Brainerd Lakes area. A new branch was built and opened in Baxter, MN in 2022.

In January 2026, Wings Credit Union completed a merger with the Colorado-based Ent Credit Union. The merged credit unions now both operate under the name Wings Credit Union.

== Wings Financial Foundation ==
The Wings Financial Foundation was founded in 2014. The Foundation focuses its efforts on financial education, nutritional needs, and community impact.
