= Petrobrazi Refinery =

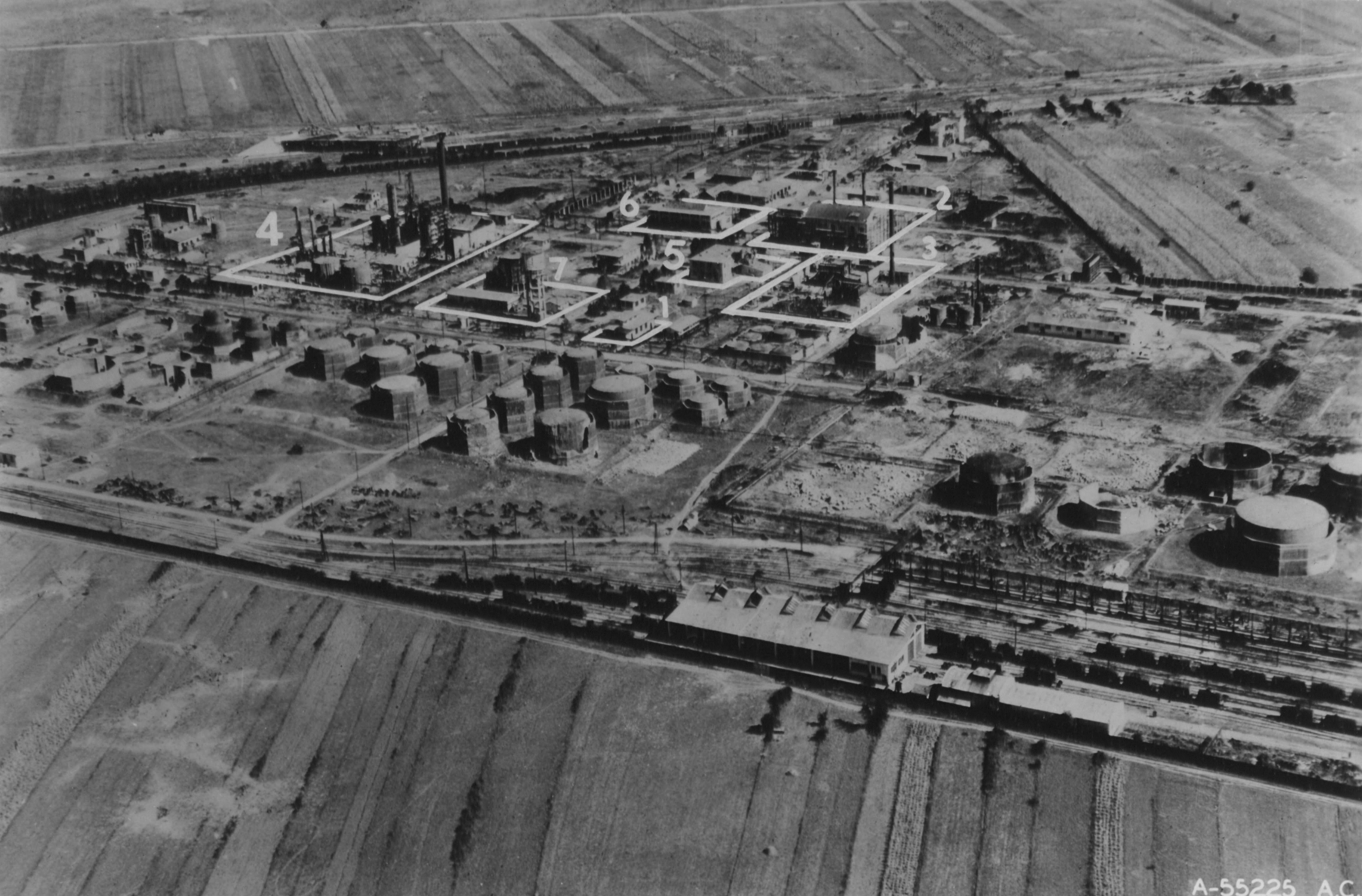
- The refinery as seen in 1944
- Interactive map of the Petrobrazi Refinery area

General information
- Type: Oil refinery
- Location: Brazi, Prahova County
- Coordinates: 44°52′18″N 26°0′27″E
- Elevation: 80 m (262 ft)
- Completed: 17 June 1934; 92 years ago
- Owner: Petrom

Height
- Height: 120 metres (chimney)

Technical details
- Floor area: 520 hectares (55,972,334 ft^{2})

Petrobrazi Refinery is one of the largest Romanian refineries and one of the largest in Eastern Europe, located near Ploiești, Prahova County having as a main activity the processing of Romanian oil but also has a separate unit specialised in processing chemical products. The refinery originally had two processing modules, each with a nominal capacity of 3.5 million tonnes per year, totaling 7 million tonnes per year. Now only one of the two modules is operational and has a capacity of 4.5 million tonnes/year or 90,000 bbl/d (14,000 m^{3}/d), 1 million tonnes larger due to an investment program from 1999 - 2000. The facility is connected by pipeline to virtually all of the oil fields in Romania and to the Port of Constanța by a pipeline with a capacity of 10,000 tonnes/day.

== History ==
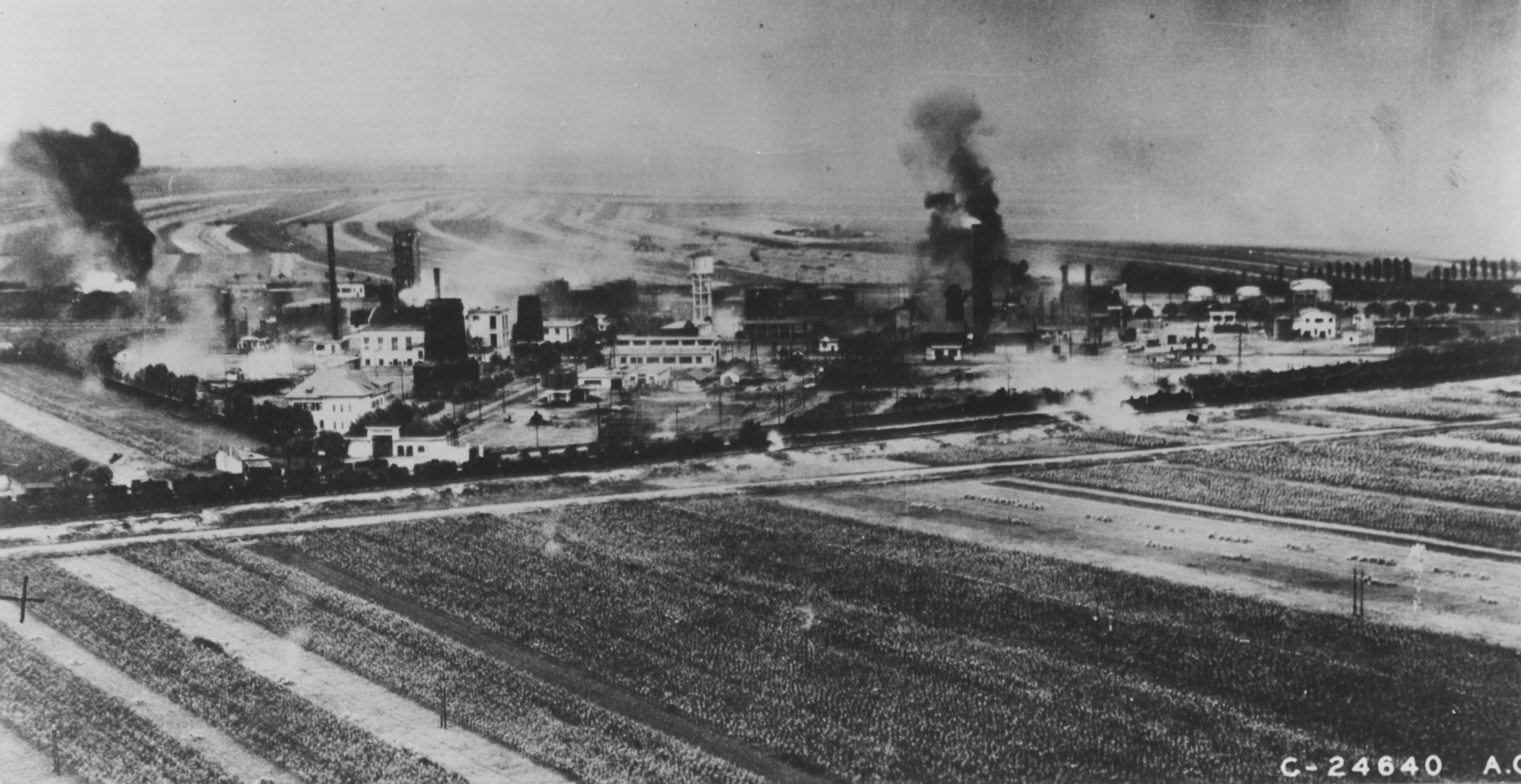
The Brazi refinery on fire in 1943

Petrobrazi was founded on 17 June 1934 by the Creditul Minier Society in a strategic industrial zone of 440 ha (4.4 km^{2}) located in Southern Romania near Ploiești. The first oil processing capacity was established in 1934 and had a processing capacity of 300,000 tonnes/year. During the Second World War, it suffered extensive damage with 75% of the refinery being destroyed. Designated as target Blue by the USAAF for Operation Tidal Wave, and being the least defended refinery of Ploiești, it was heavily damaged by the resulting fires as the German firefighter teams refused to extinguish them for fear of the detonation of other delay-action bombs. The refinery was hit again by the USAAF in 1944, and by the Luftwaffe after 23 August. Repair work began in September 1943, with financial aid received from the Romanian Ministry of Economy and the German Government. By October 1944, partial production was resumed with 530 tonnes/day being registered, though repairs continued into 1945.

In 1948, following the nationalization of Creditul Minier, the refinery was renamed to the no. 7 Refinery, and in 1956 to the Brazi Refinery. In 1962 Petrobrazi became the first modern refinery in Romania with the addition of the catalytic cracking and reforming processes. In 1965 the refinery was integrated with the Petrochemical Complex. In 1997 the state established Petrom as the national oil company also including the Petrobrazi Refinery. In 2003 the refinery becomes the first facility of its kind in Romania that has its own cogeneration power plant. With its nominal processing capacity of 7 million tonnes/year, Petrobrazi is the largest Romanian refinery. It is also the most efficient refinery in Romania having a Nelson complexity index of 11.4.

Between 2005 and 2022, OMV Petrom invested over €2bn in the Petrobrazi refinery. A third of this investment contributing to reducing environmental impact. In 2019, a Polyfuel unit was installed at the refinery. The unit is used to convert LPG and low-grade light gasoline into gasoline and diesel, with a production rate of about 50,000 tons per year. In 2023, a project worth €70 million to replace the coker units of the refinery was completed. In February 2025, construction of a sustainable aviation fuel and a renewable diesel fuel unit as well as two green hydrogen facilities began.

== See also ==
- Petrochemical industry in Romania
