= Keith K. Compton =

U.S. Air Force general (1915–2004)

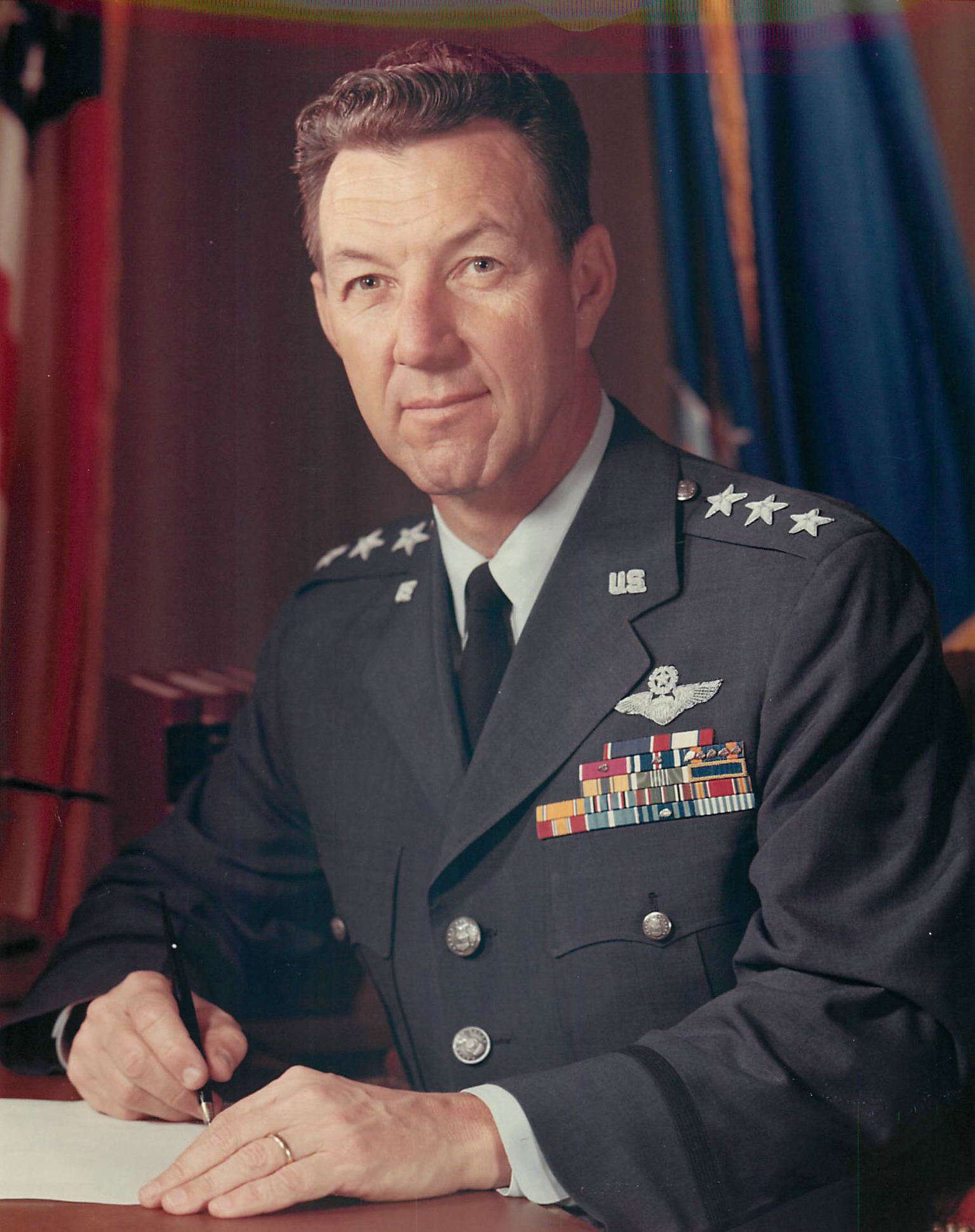
- Born: 9 December 1915; St. Joseph, Missouri, US
- Died: 15 June 2004 (aged 88); San Antonio, Texas, US
- Burial place: Arlington National Cemetery
- Military career
- Allegiance: United States
- Branch: United States Army Air Corps; United States Army Air Forces; United States Air Force
- Service years: 1938–1969
- Rank: Lieutenant General
- Commands: Vice Commander in Chief, Strategic Air Command
- Conflicts: World War II; *Operation Tidal Wave; Cold War
- Awards: Distinguished Service Cross; Distinguished Service Medal; Legion of Merit (2); Distinguished Flying Cross (2); Air Medal (10)

Keith Karl Compton (9 December 1915 – 15 June 2004) was a U.S. Air Force lieutenant general who was vice commander in chief, Strategic Air Command, with headquarters at Offutt Air Force Base, Nebraska, where he fulfilled the responsibility of the commander in chief, Strategic Air Command, in his absence and acted as his principal assistant and advisor in the formulation of SAC policies, plans and directives.

== Biography ==
Compton was born in 1915 in St. Joseph, Missouri, and graduated from Central High School there in 1933. He received his Bachelor of Arts degree from Westminster College at Fulton, Missouri, in 1937. He entered military service in February 1938 as an aviation cadet at Randolph Field, Texas, and received his pilot's wings a year later.

Compton spent the next two and a half years at Langley Field, Virginia, with the 2nd Bomb Wing, the first unit equipped with the B-17 Flying Fortress. In April 1942 he became commander of the 409th Bomb Squadron and later, at Fort Myers, Fla., operations officer for the 93rd Bomb Group.

In February 1943, Compton became commander of the 376th Bomb Group in Africa and, on 1 August 1943, led the disastrous air attack on the Ploesti oil refineries in Romania.

He was reassigned as assistant to the air chief of staff for operations, Fifteenth Air Force, in North Africa in March 1944 and returned to the United States in July that year as assistant deputy chief of staff for operations and training, Second Air Force, Colorado Springs, Colorado.

Following several command assignments and graduation from the Air University, Compton was assigned in June 1948 to the Air Proving Ground Command, Eglin Air Force Base, Florida, as deputy for operations, a position he held until February 1953. It was during this tour of duty that Compton, flying an F-86 Sabrejet, won the National Air Races Bendix Trophy for 1951, setting a new national speed record for the route.

In February 1953, Compton transferred to Strategic Air Command (SAC). Several successful command assignments in SAC resulted in his designation in September 1961 as SAC director of operations. In June 1963 he became SAC's chief of staff.

In August 1964 he was assigned to be the Inspector General of the U.S. Air Force. Six months later he was designated the deputy chief of staff for plans and operations, Headquarters U.S. Air Force. With these duties he also became the Air Force's operations deputy sitting with the Joint Chiefs of Staff for the chief of staff, U.S. Air Force. He assumed his last position in February 1967. He retired 1 August 1969.

An avid golfer, Compton won the 1978 U.S. Senior Amateur, 1 up, over Maj Gen John W. Kline and in 1980 finished runner-up to William C. Campbell.

Compton died on 15 June 2004 in San Antonio, Texas. He was buried next to his wife Mary Margaret (Swenson) Compton (20 March 1916 – 26 October 2003) in Section 68 of Arlington National Cemetery on 9 August 2004.

== Awards and decorations ==
Military decorations awarded Compton include the Distinguished Service Cross, Air Force Distinguished Service Medal, Legion of Merit with oak leaf cluster, Distinguished Flying Cross with oak leaf cluster, Air Medal with nine oak leaf clusters, the Air Force and the Army Commendation medals. In addition he holds his college's outstanding Alumni Achievement Award and is one of the few holders of aviation's famed Bendix Trophy.

USAF Command Pilot Badge
Distinguished Service Cross		Air Force Distinguished Service Medal
Legion of Merit with bronze oak leaf cluster	Distinguished Flying Cross with bronze oak leaf cluster	Air Medal with one silver and three bronze oak leaf clusters
Air Medal (second ribbon required for accouterment spacing)	Air Force Commendation Medal	Army Commendation Medal
Air Force Presidential Unit Citation	American Defense Service Medal	American Campaign Medal
European–African–Middle Eastern Campaign Medal	World War II Victory Medal	National Defense Service Medal with service star
Korean Service Medal	Air Force Longevity Service Award with silver and bronze oak leaf clusters	United Nations Service Medal for Korea

=== Distinguished Service Cross citation ===

Compton, Keith K.
Colonel, U.S. Army Air Forces
564th Bombardment Squadron, 389th Bombardment Group (H), Ninth Air Force (Attached)
Date of Action: August 1, 1943

Citation:

The President of the United States of America, authorized by Act of Congress July 9, 1918, takes pleasure in presenting the Distinguished Service Cross to Colonel (Air Corps) Keith Karl Compton, United States Army Air Forces, for extraordinary heroism in connection with military operations against an armed enemy while serving as Pilot of a B-24 Heavy Bomber in the 564th Bombardment Squadron, 389th Bombardment Group (H), Ninth Air Force (Attached), while participating in a bombing mission on 1 August 1943, against the Ploesti Oil Refineries in Rumania. Colonel Compton flew the lead airplane of the entire force of American heavy bombardment aircraft that attacked Ploesti on 1 August 1943. In this operation, one of the longest mass bombing flights and one of the most daring low-level attacks in aviation history, Colonel Compton coolly and courageously maneuvered his force at tree-top level and in the face of blazing anti-aircraft fire and balloon barrages to a position from which it could bomb the target successfully. Colonel Compton’s action in this perilous situation was one of utmost heroism and superb airmanship. His personal courage and zealous devotion to duty have upheld the highest traditions of the military service and reflect great credit upon himself, the 9th Air Force, and the United States Army Air Forces.

Military offices
Preceded by Lt Gen. John Dale Ryan	Inspector General of the United States Air Force; August 1964–1965	Succeeded by Lt Gen. William K. Martin
