= Steaua Română =

- Interactive map of the Steaua Română area

General information
- Type: Oil refinery
- Location: Câmpina, Prahova County
- Coordinates: 45°7′48″N 25°44′18″E
- Inaugurated: 1897

Steaua Română Refinery was a Romanian oil refinery, located in Câmpina, Prahova County. It was active between 1897 and 2020.

== History ==
=== Establishment and early years ===
The presence of oil in the surroundings of Câmpina had already been documented in the 17th century. In 1895, after the first mining law was passed in Romania, the joint-stock company Steaua Română was founded with Romanian and Austro-Hungarian capital. The building works started in February 1897, after the company had acquired the oil fields around Câmpina. Production began in August 1897, at a capacity of 30,000 tonnes per year. During the following years, the production facilities were extended, covering an area of 13.5 hectares. With a significant upscaling in 1904, Steaua Română could process 400,000 tons of crude oil annually, becoming the largest refinery in Europe. During its first years, the refinery triggered a local economic and demographic boom, the population of Câmpina surging from around 2,500 inhabitants in 1897 to more than 8,500 in 1912.

=== World War I and the interwar period ===
In August 1916, Romania entered World War I on the side of the Allied powers. During the same year, many of the refinery installations were strategically destroyed by the Allies to prevent them from falling into enemy hands. Later, the area went under German control, and the wells and refinery were rebuilt in 1917. Due to the significance of the refinery for the war efforts of the Central Powers, emperor Wilhelm II of Germany and field marshal August von Mackensen personally visited Câmpina on 23 September 1917. During the interwar period, the refinery was further modernised, increasing its capacity to 1.4 million tonnes per year.

=== World War II and the nationalization ===
On 22 June 1941, Romania entered World War II. Steaua Română continued production, becoming an important war target. On 1 August 1943, British and American squadrons bombed the premises of the refinery during Operation Tidal Wave, causing important damages to installations and wells. In 1944, between 5–6 May, on 10 August, and again on 18 August, the refinery suffered four more bombing raids, which rendered it inoperative. After the war, the refinery took four years to become functional again. In 1948, the communist regime nationalized the refinery, which stayed in the property of the Romanian state until 1997.

=== Final years ===
The core business of the refinery was temporarily suspended from February 2009 to June 2010 due to a lack of funding for the purchase of crude oil. In July 2010, the company laid off all 334 employees, and it was finally dissolved in 2021.
