= Wings Credit Union =

Credit union based in Colorado and Minnesota

- Formerly: Ent Credit Union
- Type: Credit union
- Industry: Financial services
- Predecessor: Wings Credit Union (1938-2026)
- Founded: 1957
- Headquarters: Colorado Springs, Colorado; United States; Apple Valley, Minnesota; United States
- Key people: Chad Graves, CEO
- Products: Savings; checking; consumer loans; mortgages; credit cards; online banking
- Total assets: $19B USD (2026)
- Number of employees: 1500
- Website: Wings Colorado; Wings Minnesota

Wings Credit Union is a community credit union serving a 21 county area in Northern, Central and Southern Colorado, eligible Minnesota and Wisconsin counties, the metro areas of Detroit, Orlando, Atlanta and employees in the air transportation industry nationwide, with more than $19 billion in assets and more than 950,000 members.

Wings Credit Union has 92 service centers, online and telephone banking, a call center, a commercial service center, and 2 mortgage loan centers.

== Membership ==
Wings Credit Union is a Colorado state community chartered credit union offering membership benefits to all who live, work, worship or attend school in Adams, Arapahoe, Boulder, Broomfield, Denver, Douglas, El Paso, Elbert, Fremont, Jefferson, Larimer, Pueblo, Teller and Weld counties, along with residents of eligible Minnesota and Wisconsin counties, the metro areas of Detroit, Orlando, and Atlanta. In addition, membership is open to civilian and military personnel of the Colorado Air National Guard, Colorado Army National Guard, those associated with Buckley Space Force Base in Aurora, Colorado, and employees in the air transportation industry nationwide.

Family members of Wings Credit Union members are also eligible to join.

== History ==
Ent was chartered in 1957 to serve military and civilian personnel assigned to Ent Air Force Base (now the United States Olympic Training Center) and Peterson Field (now Peterson Space Force Base) in Colorado Springs, Colorado. Ent and Ent Air Force Base were both named for Major General Uzal Girard Ent, commander of the Ninth Air Force during World War II. Ent Air Force Base opened in 1951 when the United States Air Defense Command moved to Colorado Springs.

Ent's community charter change, to serve El Paso and Teller counties in Colorado was approved by the National Credit Union Administration in 1999.

Ent's charter was adjusted in 2004 to include underserved areas in Denver County and Pueblo County.

Ent changed from a federal to a state of Colorado credit union charter on January 1, 2016. In April, its charter was expanded to include Arapahoe, Douglas, Fremont and Jefferson counties.

Ent's charter was expanded in October 2018 to include Adams, Boulder, Broomfield, Elbert, Larimer and Weld counties.

In January 2026, Ent Credit Union completed a merger with the Minnesota-based Wings Credit Union. The merged credit unions now both operate under the name Wings Credit Union.
