= Petrotel Lukoil Refinery =

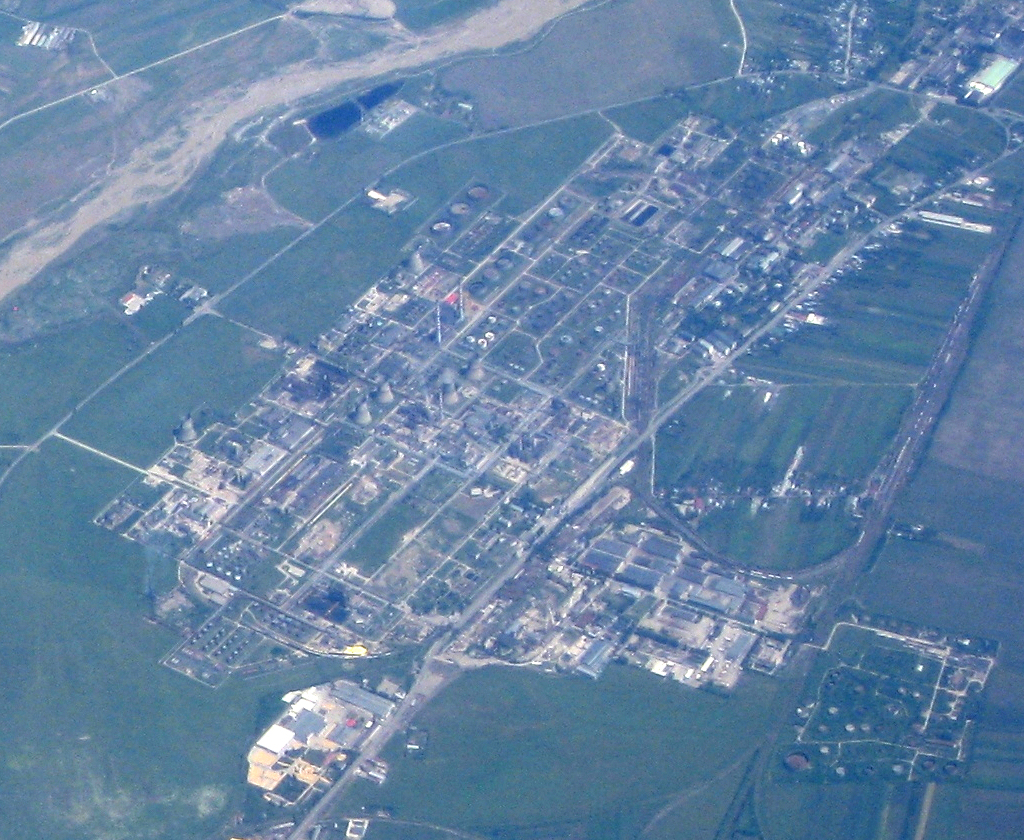
- Aerial view of the refinery in 2009
- Interactive map of the Petrotel Lukoil Refinery area

General information
- Type: Oil refinery
- Location: Ploieşti, Prahova County
- Coordinates: 44°56′47″N 26°4′53″E
- Elevation: 58 m (190 ft)
- Completed: 1904
- Owner: Lukoil

Height
- Height: 120 metres (chimney)

Technical details
- Floor area: 380 hectares (40,902,860 ft^{2})

Petrotel Lukoil Refinery is one of the largest Romanian oil refineries and one of the largest in Eastern Europe, located in Ploieşti, Prahova County. Its main activity is the processing of Romanian and Russian oil, but a separate unit is specialised in biodiesel production and another unit specialises in energy production. Russian oil is transported by oil tankers from the Novorossiysk Commercial Sea Port, unloaded at an oil terminal located in the Port of Constanţa, and transported to the refinery by rail or by a 250 kilometres (155 mi) underground pipeline that links the refinery to the port. In 2004, the refinery underwent a major modernization that reduced the production capacity of 3.5 million tonnes/year to 2.4 million tonnes/year but made the refinery more efficient, with a higher percentage of use. The refinery also has a biodiesel producing capacity of 100,000 tonnes and the energy division has a gas-fired turbine with a nominal capacity of 30 MW.

== History ==
The Petrotel refinery was established in 1904 as the Romanian-American Refinery (Romanian: Rafinăria Româno-Americană) with an annual processing capacity of 80,000 tonnes.

In World War II Romanian oil facilities were a strategic target for the Allied powers, part of the Oil Campaign; Hitler frequently said that Germany ran on Romanian oil and Swedish iron ore. The refinery was attacked by a small raid in June 1942, then by a much larger series of missions, Operation Tidal Wave in August 1943, in an effort to destroy the Axis' oil fields and refineries. The refinery area quickly became the third most heavily defended target in Europe, after Berlin and Vienna.

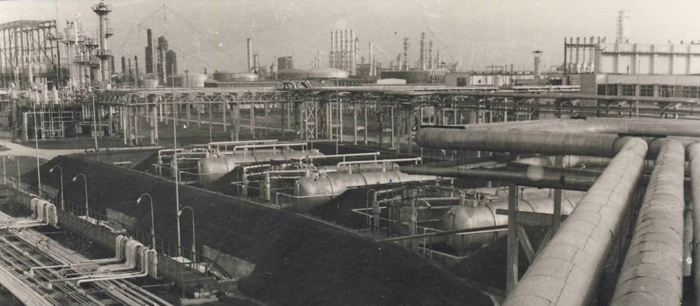
The refinery in the communist period

In 1979 the refinery was renamed Teleajen after the nearby Teleajen River and held this name until 1998 when it was privatised and sold to the Russian company Lukoil for US$ 53 million; with this sale, the refinery's name became Petrotel-Lukoil.

Following the 2022 Russian invasion of Ukraine and the subsequent sanctions against Russia, it was agreed from 5 December 2022 that Petrotel Lukoil Refinery will only refine non-Russian crude oil.

In October 2023 Romania invalidated the petroleum products wholesale trading licence that had been held by the Swiss-registered subsidiary of Russian group Lukoil, Litasco SA, which supplies crude oil to and distributes refined oil from the refinery. Apart from a tax dispute, Romania claims the refinery does not disclose the source of its crude oil, the amount it processes or where the refined oil is distributed.

== See also ==
- Petrochemical industry in Romania
