= Delay-action bomb =

Aerial bomb designed to detonate some time after impact

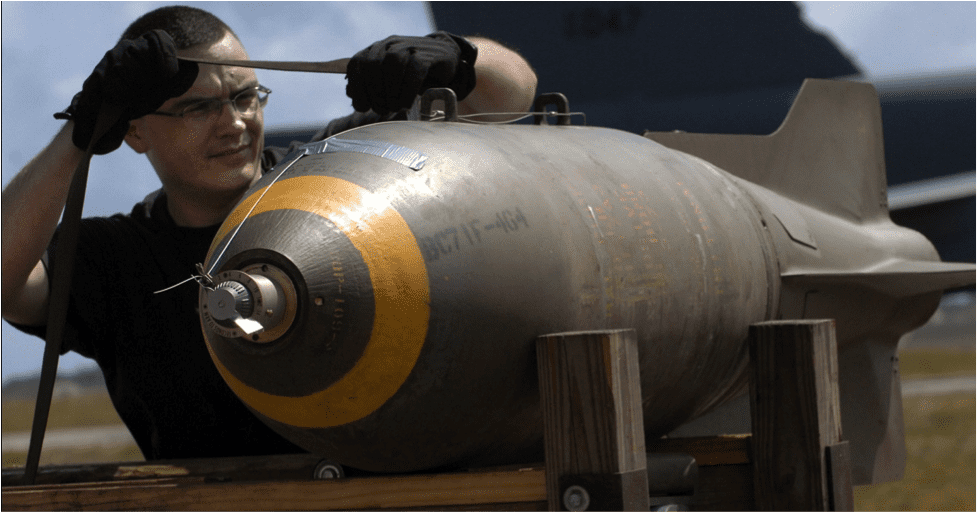
A delayed-fuse bomb, similar in function to the ones used by the Japanese on Attack on Pearl Harbor.

A delay-action bomb is an aerial bomb designed to explode some time after impact, with the bomb's fuzes set to delay the explosion for times ranging from very brief to several weeks. Short delays are used to allow the bomb to penetrate before exploding: "a delay action bomb striking the roof of a tall building will penetrate through several floors before bursting". Similarly, a bomb with a time-delay fuze could penetrate the superstructure, deck or armour of a warship and explode inside, causing greater damage compared to the same bomb exploding outside on contact. A short delay would also prevent a fighter-bomber or ground-attack aircraft getting caught in the blast of its own bomb after a low-altitude attack. Longer delays were intended to disrupt salvage and other activities, to spread terror in areas where there could still be live bombs and to attack bomb disposal workers.

Such bombs were used widely by British and American and German forces during World War II. One use was to hamper and delay reconstruction and repair of bombed airfields.

Towards the end of the war both British and German bombs became de facto mines, with a secondary fuze mechanism activated by light tilting or magnets to kill those trying to disarm them.

German delayed-action bombs were used in attacks on several high-profile targets in London, including Broadcasting House and Buckingham Palace

== See also ==
- Anti-handling device
- Bomb disposal
- Danger UXB, a 1979 British ITV television series set during the Second World War
- Laydown delivery (nuclear weapons)
- Time bomb
