= IAR 471 =

Romanian dive bomber prototype

General information
- Type: Ground attack aircraft and dive bomber
- Manufacturer: Industria Aeronautică Română
- Number built: 1

The IAR 471 was a Romanian World War II prototype of ground attack aircraft and dive bomber aircraft built in 1943 by Industria Aeronautică Română (IAR).

== Development ==
The IAR-81 had not proved a great success as an improvised dive bomber and experience with the IAR-47 showed that the IAR K14 would not be up to the demands of powering a full-sized dive bomber. Thus by early 1943 the Royal Romanian Air Force still lacked an effective ground support aircraft. In November 1942, IAR had at last secured a license for the manufacture of the German DB 605 engine and planning now centred on this powerplant. On January 16, 1943, a new dive bomber project, the IAR-471, was commissioned which was to be powered by the DB 605. Although the Germans lent Romania numerous Stukas from mid-1943, they would not sell any. Therefore, the design of the IAR-471 was persevered for reasons of self-sufficiency.

Despite its designation, the IAR-471 bore little resemblance to the smaller IAR 47 and was essentially a different aircraft. It was designed with a superior performance to the Stuka, much helped by the retractable undercarriage, but a lighter bomb load, and on May 7, 1944, the Stuka's two underwing 37mm cannons were ordered to be included in its specification. It was planned to order 100 IAR-471s and 136 engines from IAR in 1944/1945, but IAR was in the throes of dispersing its factories and beginning production of the Bf 109G and declared itself incapable of simultaneously producing the IAR-471. This halted the project even before Romania's defection to the Allies on August 23, 1944. No prototype flew. There was (at least) one IAR 471 prototype built.

== Operators ==
Kingdom of Romania

- Royal Romanian Air Force

== Specifications (IAR 471) ==
Data from On Three Fronts: Romania's Aircraft Industry During World War Two

General characteristics

- Crew: 2
- Length: 11 m (36 ft 1 in)
- Wingspan: 14 m (45 ft 10 in)
- Height: 3.2 m (10 ft 6 in)
- Wing area: 29 m^{2} (312 sq ft)
- Gross weight: 4,300 kg (9,479 lb) without bomb load
- Powerplant: 1 × IAR DB 605 , 1,100 kW (1,475 hp)

Performance

- Maximum speed: 490 km/h (304 mph, 264 kn)
- Service ceiling: 8,000 m (26,245 ft)

Armament

- 1 x 20mm MG151 cannon firing through the airscrew spinner
- 2 x 7.92mm Rheinmetall wing mounted
- 2 x 37mm BK 3,7 Rheinmetall under wing
- 2 x 7.92mm Rheinmetall MG for rear gunner
- 500 kg (1,100lb) bomb under fuselage
- 2 x 100 kg (220lb) bombs

== See also ==
Aircraft of comparable role, configuration, and era

- Caproni A.P.1
- Ilyushin Il-2 Sturmovik
- Douglas SBD Dauntless
- Curtiss SB2C Helldiver
- Aichi D3A "Val"
- Blackburn Skua
- Heinkel He 118
- Yokosuka D4Y
- Henschel Hs 123
- Henschel Hs 129
