= K14 =

K14 may refer to:

- K14_V2 (World renowned rapper/musician)
- K-14 (Kansas highway)
- K-14 education
- K-14 process, a photographic film developing process
- HMS K14, a submarine of the Royal Navy
- IAR K14, a Romanian aircraft engine
- Kimpo Air Base, now Gimpo International Airport, established during the Korean War
- Nissan Micra (K14), a Japanese subcompact car
- S&T Motiv K14, a South Korean sniper rifle
- Sonata in C, K. 14, by Wolfgang Amadeus Mozart

== See also ==
- 14K (disambiguation)
- K (disambiguation)
