= IAR 47 =

Romanian light bomber prototype

General information
- Type: Reconnaissance and light bomber
- Manufacturer: Industria Aeronautică Română
- Primary user: Royal Romanian Air Force
- Number built: 2

History
- First flight: 1942

The IAR 47 was a 1942 prototype aircraft built by Industria Aeronautică Română.

== Development ==
In 1941, it became apparent that the then current Romanian reconnaissance type, the IAR 39, was no longer an effective design. Therefore, IAR designed a replacement type, the IAR-47. Effectively a hybrid of the IAR 39 and IAR 80, it used their IAR 14K IV C32 engine. The IAR 47 prototype was flown for the first time in 1942 to meet a requirement for a tactical bombing and reconnaissance aircraft.

The aircraft was similar to the IAR 39, except for the fact that it was a low-wing monoplane and had a smaller cockpit (for 2 instead of 3). Its fuselage, based on the IAR 39, was of mixed construction. Compared to the IAR 39, the observers fuselage side windows were deleted, and the crew reduced to two, pilot and observer/rear gunner, armed with a 7.92mm Rheinmetall MG. Like the IAR 80, the IAR 47 was a low-winged monoplane, and used a re-enforced version of that type's undercarriage. Two 7.92mm Rheinmetall MGs were mounted, and six 110 lb (50 kg) bombs could be carried in a bomb bay between the crew's positions. Reconnaissance was its primary mission, however, and the bomb bay was normally filled with a fuel tank, increasing its normal fuel load of 127 Imp gal (580 L) to 209 Imp gal (950 L). The mission fit was three cameras, one vertical and two 45° oblique, in the fuselage underside. The unarmed prototype was flight tested in autumn 1942, and exhibited good handling characteristics. However, in the light of the improved Soviet fighters now in service, its low powered engine, and light armament, it was considered obsolescent, and anyway, all of IAR's production capacity was required for Bf 109 production. Therefore, development of the IAR 47 was stopped in January 1943, one prototype being destroyed in a USAAF air raid in 1944.

== Variants ==
There were (at least) two I.A.R. 47 prototypes. The first one (with partially glazed side and bottom fuselage) appears in the colour photos, while the other one( YR-IGR), which resembles more the I.A.R. 80 fitted with long span wings, did not have side and bottom fuselage windows and appears in the 1952 photos

== Operators ==
Kingdom of Romania

- Royal Romanian Air Force

Romania

- Romanian Air Force

== Specifications (IAR 47) ==
Data from

General characteristics

- Crew: 2
- Length: 11 m (36 ft 1 in)
- Wingspan: 12.5 m (41 ft 0 in)
- Height: 3.2 m (10 ft 6 in)
- Wing area: 23.8 m^{2} (256 sq ft)
- Gross weight: 3,550 kg (7,826 lb)
- Powerplant: 1 × IAR K.14-IV C32 radial piston , 716 kW (960 hp)

Performance

- Maximum speed: 464 km/h (288 mph, 251 kn) at 4,300 m (14,100 ft)
- Range: 850 km (530 mi, 460 nmi) without bomb bay tank
- Service ceiling: 8,000 m (26,245 ft)

Armament

- 2 x 7.92mm Rheinmetall MG in the wings
- 1 x 7.92mm Rheinmetall MG for rear gunner
- 6 x 50 kg bombs

== See also ==
Aircraft of comparable role, configuration, and era

- Fokker C.X
- Polikarpov R-Z
- Henschel Hs 126
