= IAR 79 =

Romanian version of Italian SM.79 bomber

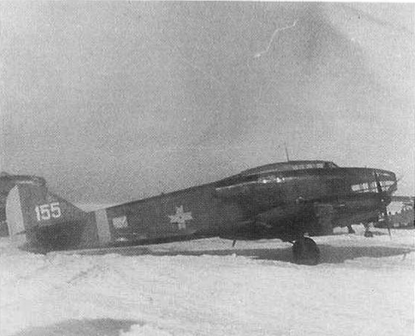
- JRS-79B at an airfield, 1943

General information
- Type: Medium bomber
- Manufacturer: Industria Aeronautică Română (IAR)
- Primary user: Royal Romanian Air Force
- Number built: 86

History
- Introduction date: 1938
- First flight: 1937
- Retired: 1952
- Developed from: Savoia-Marchetti SM.79

The IAR 79 was a twin-engine bomber and military reconnaissance aircraft with a wood and metal structure that saw service in World War II built under licence in Brașov, Romania, by Industria Aeronautică Română

== Development ==
In May 1937, Romania ordered 24 Savoia-Marchetti SM.79B bombers from the Savoia-Marchetti company powered by two Romanian-built IAR K14 engines. This variant was designated SM-79B and equipped the 1st Bomber Group (71st and 72nd Bomber Squadron) of the 1st Bomber Flotilla (Flotila 1 Bombardament).

The second batch of aircraft were upgraded by replacing the IAR K14 engines with 1200 hp water cooled Junkers Jumo 211Da engines increasing the maximum speed from 350 km/h to 405 km/h. Eight of these new airplanes were ordered from Italy in 1939. They were designated JIS-79B (Junkers-Italia-Savoia). But they didn't arrive until August 1941. Between 1941 and 1942, an additional 48 aircraft were license-built by the IAR factory in Brașov under designation IAR JRS-79B (Junkers-România-Savoia).

In the autumn of 1942, another order of 36 bombers was issued to the IAR factory. They were upgraded by replacing the Junkers Jumo 211Da engine with new Junkers Jumo 211F, a 1400 hp engine.

== Design ==
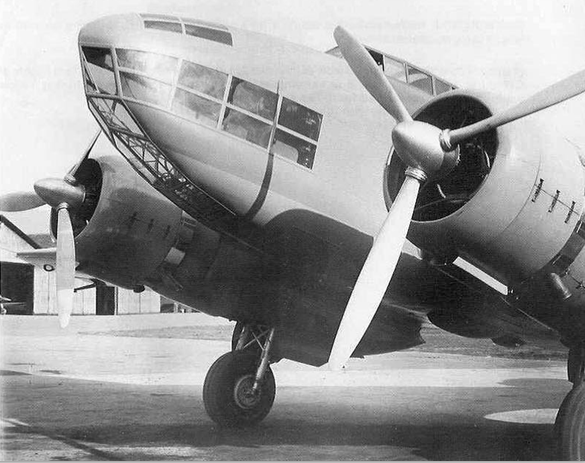
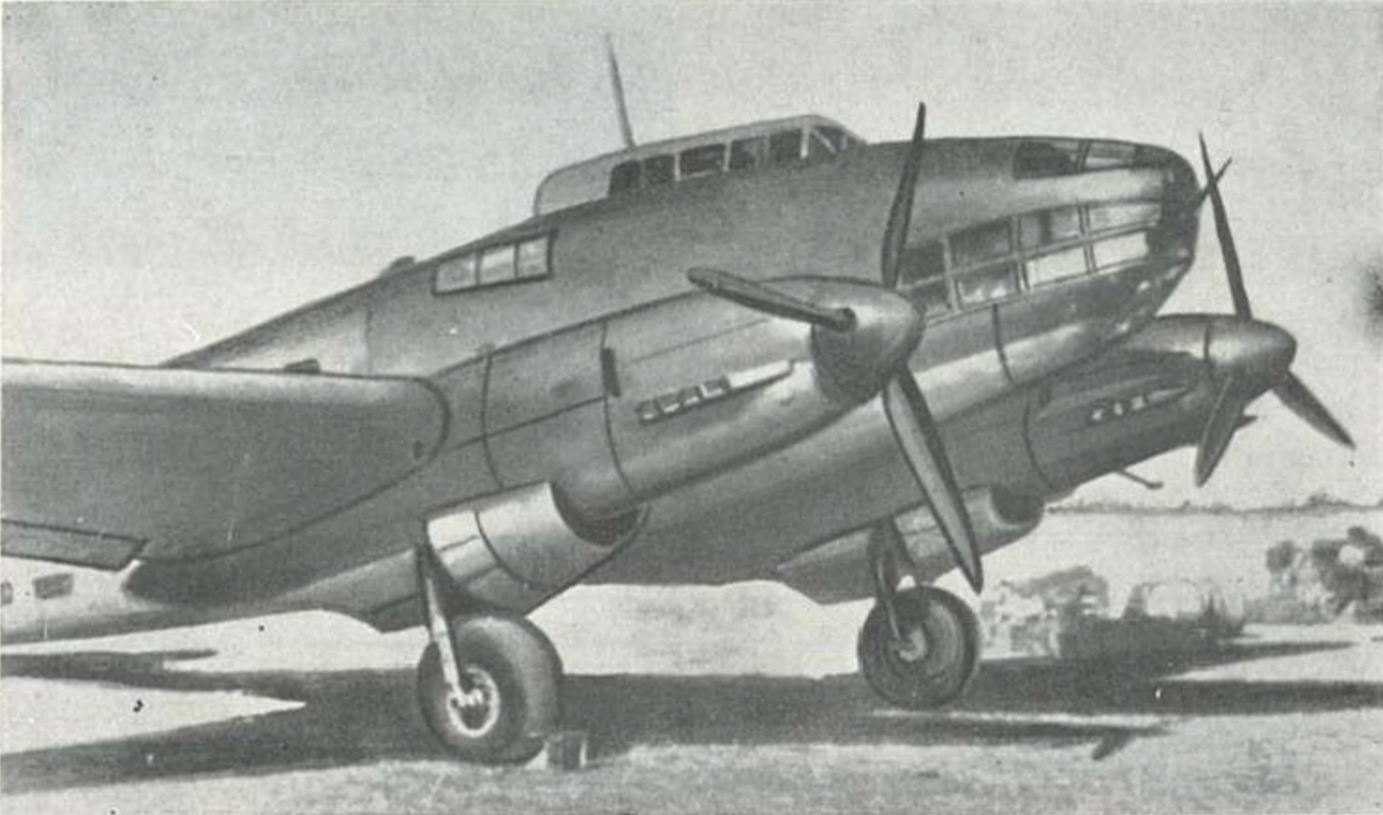
Nose of the Romanian SM.79B (left) and IAR JRS-79B (right)

The IAR.79 was a cantilever low-wing monoplane bimotor, with a retractable taildragger undercarriage. The fuselage of the IAR.79 was made of a welded tubular steel frame and covered with duralumin in the forward section, duralumin and plywood on the upper fuselage surface, and fabric on all other surfaces The wings were of all-wood construction, with the trailing edge flaps and leading edge slats (Handley-Page type) to offset its relatively small size. The internal structure was made of three spars, linked with cantilevers and a skin of plywood. The wing had a dihedral of 2° 15'. Ailerons were capable of rotating through +13/-26°, and were used together with the flaps in low-speed flight and in takeoff. Its capabilities were significantly greater than its predecessor, the SM.79, with over 1,850 kW (2,480 hp) available and a high wing loading that gave it characteristics not dissimilar to a large fighter.

The engines fitted to the main bomber version were two 750 kW (1,010 hp) IAR K14 radials, equipped with variable-pitch, all-metal three-bladed propellers. Speeds attained were around 430 km/h (270 mph) at 4,250 m (13,940 ft), with a relatively low practical ceiling of 6,500 m (21,300 ft). Cruise speed was 373 km/h (232 mph) at 5,000 m (16,000 ft), but the best cruise speed was 259 km/h (161 mph) (60% power). The landing was characterized by a 200 km/h (120 mph) final approach with the slats extended, slowing to 145 km/h (90 mph) with extension of flaps, and finally the run over the field with only 200 m (660 ft) needed to land (2,050 rpm, 644 Hg pressure). With full power available and flaps set for takeoff, the SM.79 could be airborne within 300 m (980 ft).

== Operational service ==
Initial in 1938 S-79Bs equipped the 1st Bomber Group (71st and 72nd Bomber Squadron). In July 1941, one of the 2nd Bomber Group's squadrons, the 75th Bomber Squadron, was re-equipped with new JRS-79B. These units went on to fight in the Siege of Odessa as part of the Air Combat Group. In 1942 newer JIS-79Bs were assigned to the 71st Squadron. The 72nd Squadron was re-equipped with JRS-79B. The remaining older S-79Bs were transferred to flying schools. In 1944 the 2nd Bomber Group (82nd and 83rd Squadron) was re-equipped with IAR JRS-79B1. In October 1944 the 1st Bomber Group was reorganized (72nd and 82nd Squadron) and sent to the front. This unit fought on until the end of the war in May 1945.

== Variants ==
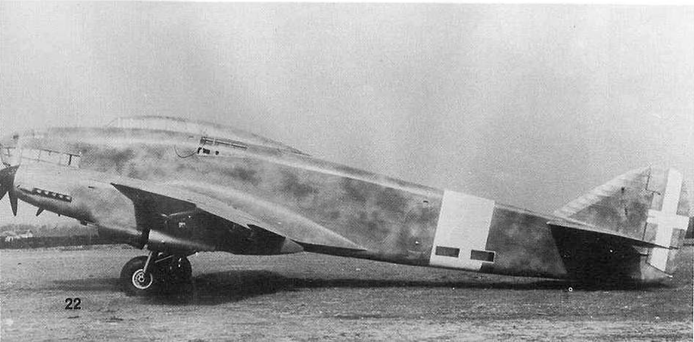
JIS-79B in Italy

S-79B
Romanian designation of the Savoia-Marchetti SM.79B bombers with 2 x IAR K14 1000 hp engine. Italian-built, numbered 1–24.
JIS-79B
Romanian designation of the Savoia-Marchetti SM.79B bombers with 2 x Junkers Jumo 211Da 1200 hp engine, The aircraft made were Italian-built, numbered 101–108.
IAR JRS-79B
Romanian designation of the IAR 79 with 2 x Junkers Jumo 211Da 1200 hp engine, built under license by IAR factory. A total of 48 were manufactured by the Romanian factory (numbered 109–156).
IAR JRS-79B1
Romanian designation of the IAR 79 with 2 x Junkers Jumo 211F 1400 hp engine, built by IAR factory. A total of 38 were manufactured by the Romanian factory (numbered 201–238).

== Operators ==
Romania

- Royal Romanian Air Force

== Specifications (IAR JRS-79B1) ==
Data from Janes 1938,

General characteristics

- Crew: 5
- Length: 16.82 m (55 ft 2 in)
- Wingspan: 21.2 m (69 ft 7 in)
- Height: 4.1 m (13 ft 5 in) tail down
- Wing area: 60.6 m^{2} (652 sq ft)
- Airfoil: root: NACA 2418; tip: NACA 2412
- Empty weight: 6,400 kg (14,110 lb)
- Gross weight: 11,785 kg (25,981 lb)
- Powerplant: 2 × Junkers Jumo 211F V-12 inverted liquid-cooled piston engines, 980 kW (1,320 hp) each
- Propellers: 3-bladed constant-speed propellers

Performance

- Maximum speed: 436 km/h (271 mph, 235 kn) at 6,000 m (20,000 ft)
- Range: 1,750 km (1,090 mi, 940 nmi)
- Ferry range: 1,900 km (1,200 mi, 1,000 nmi)
- Endurance: 5 hours
- Service ceiling: 9,000 m (30,000 ft)
- Take-off run: 400 m (1,300 ft)
- Landing run: 350 m (1,150 ft)

Armament

- Guns: ** 5 × 7.92 mm machine guns
  - 1 × 20 mm cannon
- Bombs: 1500 kg of bombs

== Bibliography ==
- Antoniu, Dan (2014). Illustrated History of Romanian Aeronautics. ISBN 978-973-0-17209-6.
