= IAR 80 =

Romanian WW2 fighter-bomber

IAR 80 / IAR 81
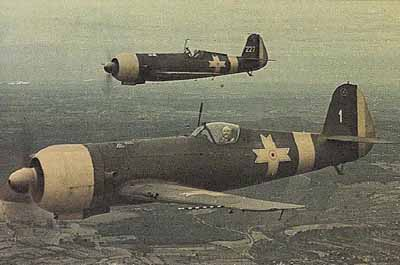
- Pair of Romanian IAR 80s

General information
- Type: Fighter aircraft
- Manufacturer: Industria Aeronautică Română (IAR)
- Primary user: Royal Romanian Air Force
- Number built: 450

History
- Manufactured: 1940–1944
- Introduction date: February 1941
- First flight: 12 April 1939
- Retired: 1949; 1952 (IAR-80DC)
- Developed from: PZL P.24

The IAR 80 was a Romanian World War II low-wing monoplane, all-metal monocoque fighter and ground-attack aircraft. When it first flew, in 1939, it was comparable to contemporary designs being deployed by the airforces of the most advanced military powers such as the Hawker Hurricane and Bf 109E. Production problems and lack of available armament delayed entry of the IAR 80 into service until 1941. It remained in frontline use until the end of the war.

== Development ==
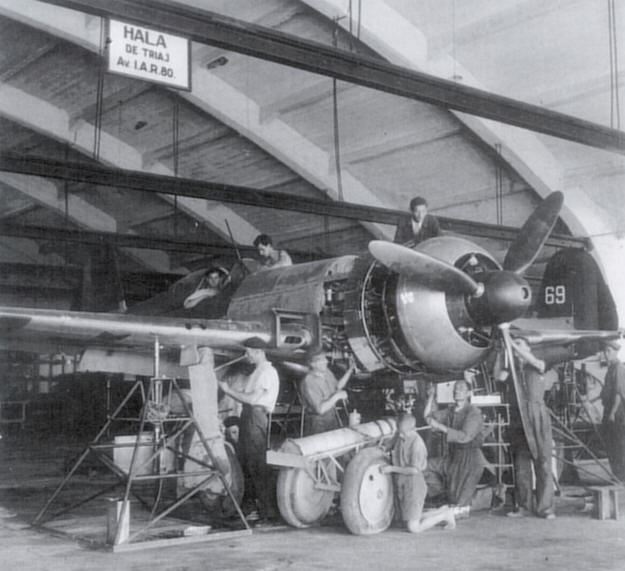
IAR-80 undergoing maintenance

In order to ensure that the Royal Romanian Air Force (ARR) could continue to be supplied with aircraft in time of war, the government subsidized the creation of three major aircraft manufacturers in the 1920s and 1930s. The first was Societatea Pentru Exploatări Tehnice (SET) which was formed in Bucharest in 1923. Next came Industria Aeronautică Română (IAR) which set up shop in Brașov in 1925. Finally there was Întreprinderea de Construcții Aeronautice Românești (ICAR), which was founded in Bucharest in 1932.

In 1930 the Romanian government issued specifications for a new fighter. Although the government was not anticipating bids from its own aircraft industry, IAR produced several prototypes in response to the tender.

The contract was eventually won by the Polish PZL P.11. The ARR purchased 50 of a modified version called the P.11b, all of which were delivered in 1934. A second contest was also fought between the newer IAR 14 and PZL P.24 designs, and once again the PZL design won a contract for another 50 aircraft.

Although IAR's own designs had not entered production, they nevertheless won the contracts to build PZL fighters and Gnome-Rhône 14K engines under license. As a result of these and other licence contracts the company had enough money to fund a design studio even if its designs never went into production.

Despite losing to PZL, an IAR design team led by Ion Grosu continued work on fighter designs. He was convinced that the low-wing design of the IAR 24 represented a better design than the PZL gull-wing design, which was often referred to as the "Polish wing". Once again the team studied the new PZL fighter looking to incorporate its best features into a new aircraft, and the result was the IAR 80.

== Design ==
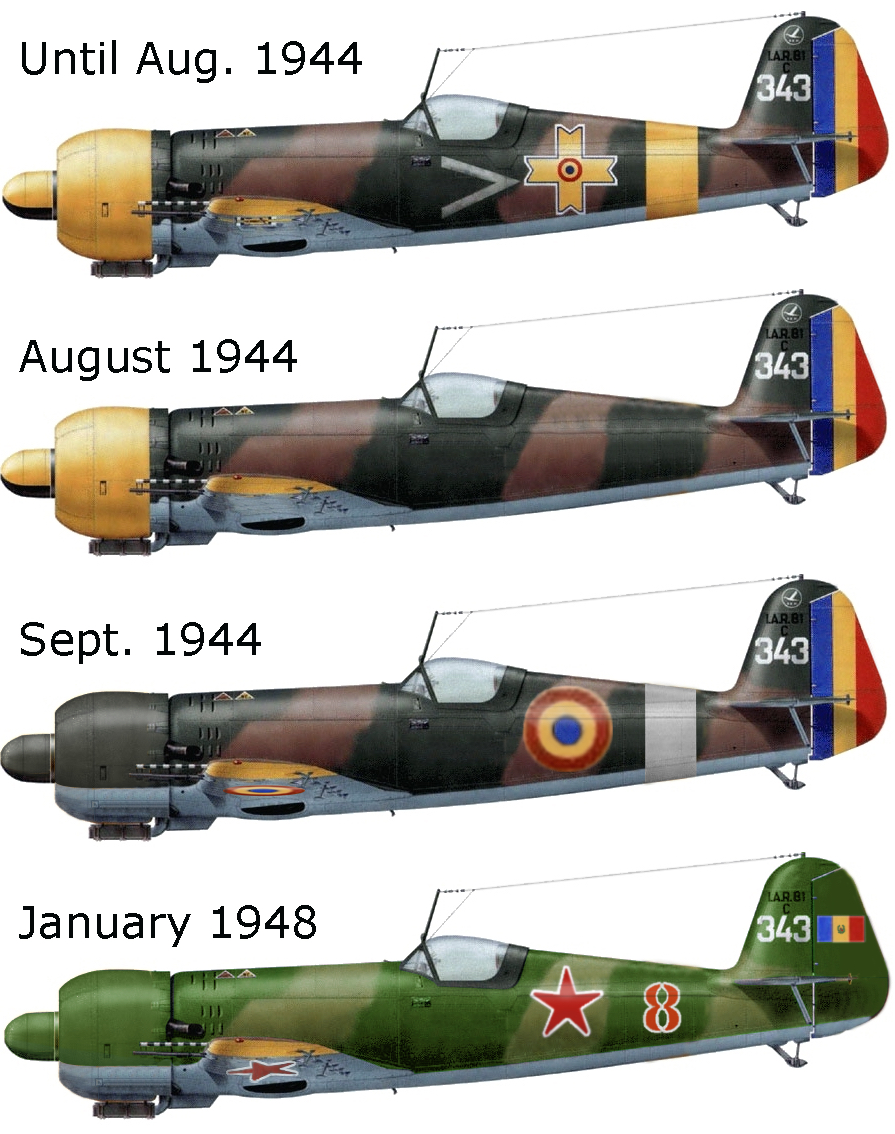
IAR 80 side view

- Description: Low-wing monoplane fighter with conventional control surface layout.
- Fuselage: The fuselage was circular in cross-section, turning to egg-shaped behind the cockpit where it incorporated a ridge-back. The rear fuselage layout, and the engine cowling were based on the Polish PZL P.24.
- Wings: The wings were tapered with rounded tips, the trailing edge angled very slightly forwards. Small flaps ran from the fuselage to a point about 1/3 along the span, where the ailerons started and extended out to the rounded wingtips.
- Other details: A bubble canopy was fitted, sliding to the rear to open, providing excellent visibility except over the nose due to its rearward position. A conventional tailwheel landing gear was used, with the main gear wide-set and retracting inward, with a non-retractable tail skid.

The semi-monocoque tail was copied directly from the PZL P.24. The fuselage from the engine back to the cockpit was new, consisting of a welded steel tube frame covered with duralumin sheeting. The wings were mounted low and were of the same design as those used on the early IAR 24, which had competed with the PZL P.24.

According to an urban legend, the wing profile was copied from the Italian Savoia-Marchetti SM.79 bomber, in service with the ARR at the time, as the design team lacked the time for wing section studies. As a result, the profile was less favorable for higher speeds, but gave the aircraft more maneuverability. This is false as the contract for the SM.79B licence was signed on October 1, 1938, roughly one year after the IAR 80 prototype was completed.

The cockpit's interior, instruments, and gunsight were imported from foreign suppliers. This effort to aggregate a fighter from various sources was a result of the last-minute demands for a frontline fighter. The initial IAR 80s were fitted with iron sights. Starting with the 21st aircraft, these were replaced by Goerz GM2 reflector sights which were manufactured under license by Întreprinderea Optică Română as the "Telereflex" gunsights.

A Luftwaffe major who tested it in March 1941 had this to say about the IAR 80:

Takeoff and landing are very good. It's 20–30 km/h slower than the Bf 109E. The climb to 5,000 meters is equivalent. In a dogfight, the turns are also equivalent, although the long nose reduces the visibility. In a dive it's outclassed by the Bf 109E, because it lacks an automated propeller pitch regulator. It's a fighter adequate to modern needs.

=== Prototypes ===
Work began on the IAR 80 prototype in late 1937, originally with an open cockpit and the 870 hp (650 kW) IAR K14 IIIc32 engine which was a licensed Gnome-Rhône 14K II Mistral Major. The prototype was completed slowly, and first took to the air in April 1939. Test flights of the prototype were impressive; the aircraft could reach 510 km/h (320 mph) at 4,000 m (13,000 ft), service ceiling of 11,000 m (36,000 ft) with the ability to climb to 5,000 m (16,000 ft) in 6 minutes, which was respectable at the time, but could not match the performance of contemporary Supermarine Spitfire or Messerschmitt Bf 109 fighters. In comparison the PZL P.24E was almost 450 kg lighter, yet over 80 km/h slower with the same engine. The IAR 80 also proved to be enjoyable to fly and was maneuverable.

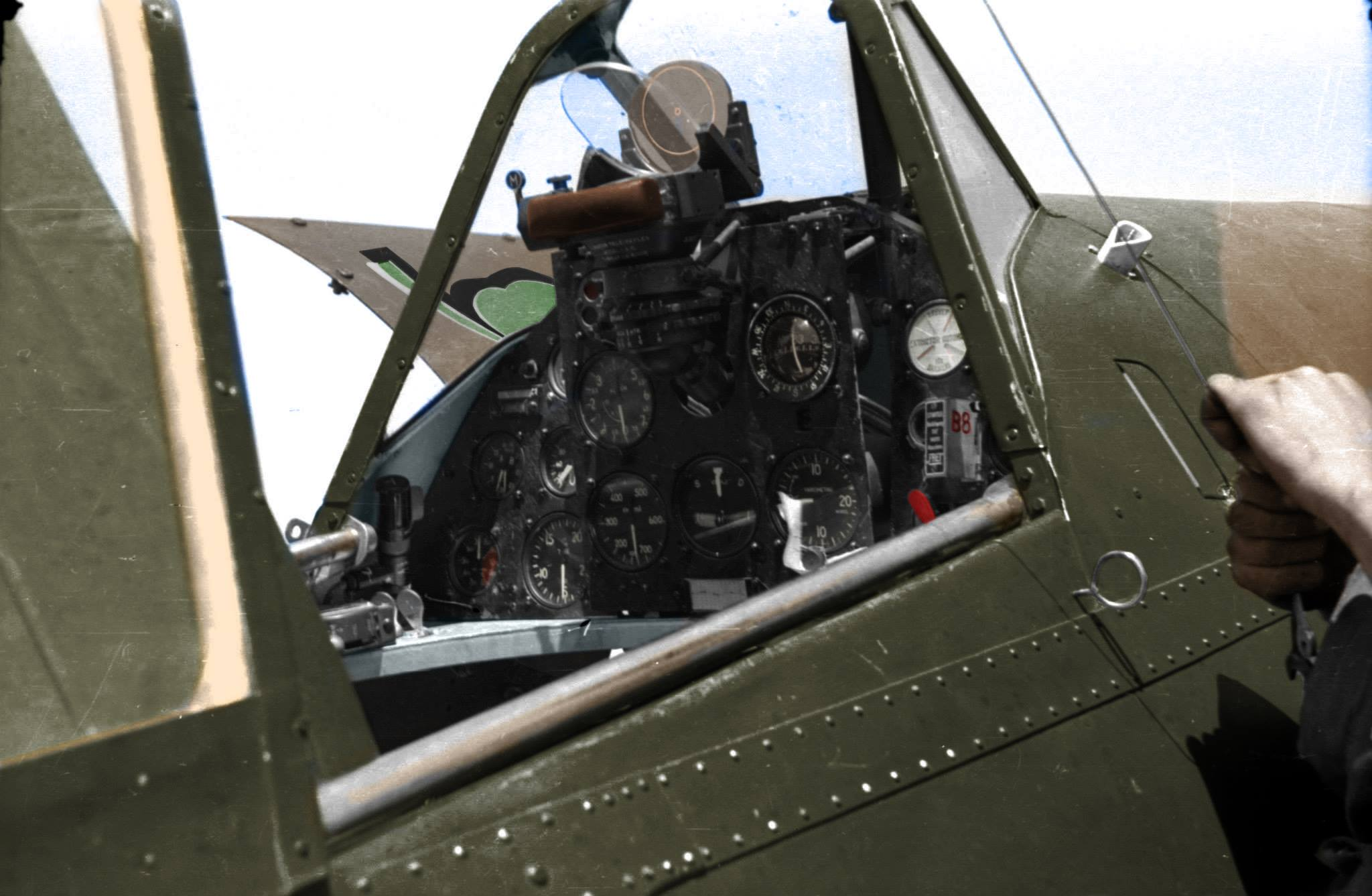
IAR 80 cockpit

A number of minor problems turned up during the prototype phase, and were dealt with over the next year. To improve power the design was updated to mount the newer 930 hp (690 kW) IAR K14 IIIc36. However this engine was slightly heavier than the IIIc32, which required the rear fuselage to be stretched to move the center of gravity back into the proper position. The extra space in the fuselage allowed the fuel tanks to be increased in volume to 455 L (100 imp gal). The wings were also enlarged and the tail was revised to eliminate the bracing struts.

A side effect of this extreme rearward position was that the pilot had even worse forward visibility while taxiing than most other taildraggers. To address this somewhat, the pilot's seat was raised slightly and a bubble canopy was added.

The updated prototype was tested competitively against the Heinkel He 112, which had arrived in Romania as the start of a potentially large order. Although the He 112 was more heavily armed with two machine guns and two 20 mm cannon, the IAR 80 proved to be a better design and the ARR ordered 100 IAR 80s in December 1939 while only 30 He 112s were accepted. The government in Bucharest ordered another 100 IAR 80s in August 1940. Further orders for batches of 50 IAR 80s followed on 5 September 1941 and 11 April 1942, then another 100 on 28 May 1942, to be followed by 35 of the IAR 81C development in February 1943, with a further 15 in January 1944.

=== IAR 80 ===
Production of the IAR 80 started immediately, although the armament proved to be a serious problem. The prototype had mounted only two Belgian-made Fabrique Nationale 7.92 mm machine guns, a licensed modification of the Browning .30 cal. This armament was not heavy enough against modern aircraft, and the production model was expected to mount six. The German invasion of Belgium in 1940 suspended the supply from FN, and there was no suitable replacement. The first aircraft began production in January 1940, and by 10 July the first IAR 80 took flight, followed by the 2nd on 19 July. The first five aircraft were ready to be delivered in November, with the first batch of 20 being delivered by the middle of February 1941. By April, all 50 initially ordered IAR 80s were delivered. The armament supply remained inadequate so production models only carried four guns.

The initial batch of fighters was well received by the Romanian pilots, but they found the aircraft underpowered and lacking firepower. In order to address this, the aircraft mounted the 960 hp (720 kW) IAR K14 IVc32 engine in the 21st through 50th examples, but the firepower concern could not be resolved at the time.

=== IAR 80A ===
By April 1941 Romania was firmly in the German sphere of influence, and as a result the Germans released more FN guns for its use. These were quickly installed, and the resulting 80A model finally mounted the original complement of six guns. Armored glass in the windscreen, seat-back armor, and a new gun sight were also added at the same time, along with the newer 1,025 hp (764 kW) IAR K14 IVc32 1000A engine. The extra engine power proved to be more than the fuselage structure was designed to handle, and it had to be reinforced with a duralumin "belt" just behind the cockpit in the first 95 A series aircraft built before the fuselage could be modified.

Although the IAR 80A had a more powerful engine, the added weight of the guns, ammunition and armor plating reduced the top speed slightly to 316 mph (509 km/h). Nevertheless the new model was clearly an advancement, and the A model replaced the earlier one on the assembly line starting with the 51st airframe. Eight of these had been completed in time for the invasion of the Soviet Union on 22 June 1941.

FN guns remained in short supply, so throughout late 1941 and early 1942, guns were stripped from PZLs and observation aircraft for use in the IAR 80s.

=== IAR 80B ===
Combat over the Soviet Union proved that even six of the FN guns still lacked punch, and once again firepower was increased, with 13.2 mm FN machine guns taken from Romanian SM.79s were installed in the IAR 80 in a new lengthened wing. The result was the IAR 80B, which also introduced new radios, an area where the aircraft had previously been weak.

A total of 55 of the new design were completed, including 20 airframes which were originally intended to be IAR 81As. These last 20 were thus able to carry a 50 kg (110 lb) bomb or a 100 L (22 imp gal; 26 US gal) drop tank under each wing. The entire series were delivered between June and September 1942.

==== IAR 81A ====
As the fighter model was converting from the A to B series with the addition of the 13.2 mm guns, likewise the 81 model was upgraded in the same fashion, creating the IAR 81A. The only distinguishing feature between the 80B and the 81A was the 81's centerline bomb rack, and both were built on the same assembly line. The first order for 81As was cancelled and the airframes were instead delivered to fighter units as 80Bs. Efforts to obtain the Ju 87 dragged on, so a second batch of IAR 81As was ordered in May 1943 to replace losses. Once again fate intervened, and the Germans released the Ju 87 for delivery before the batch could be completed. Like the first batch, these 10 airframes were delivered as fighters.

=== IAR 80C ===
The supply of the 13.2 mm guns was clearly limited, and in a further attempt to increase the firepower of the design the Romanians signed a deal with Ikaria in Germany for a supply of 20 mm MG FF/M cannon. These were a licensed version of the Swiss Oerlikon FF, which had been in use in various German aircraft. The new gun also required a redesign of the wing. Initially 60 IAR 81Bs were intended to be dive bombers, but these were delivered without the centerline bomb rack as fighters and designated IAR 80C. After the first 10 were completed, self-sealing tanks were added along with improved seat-back armor. The first 10 were delivered in December 1942 and the entire order was completed by April 1943.

=== IAR 81 ===
The ARR had intended to replace its light strike and dive bomber aircraft for some time when the war opened in 1941. The first role was to be filled by the IAR 37 (and later 38 and 39 models) but the plan was to fill the second role with the Junkers Ju 87. Once again the Germans deferred and the ARR was left searching for a design. The modification of the existing IAR 80 as a dive bomber was seen as a reasonable option, easier than designing an entirely new aircraft; as well as having obvious production benefits.

The result was the IAR 81, a minor change to the IAR 80A models that were then in production, adding a hinged bomb cradle under the centerline to throw a 225 kg (496 lb) bomb clear of the propeller (many dive bombers used a similar system). Delivery consisted of a shallow dive from about 3,000 to 1,000 m (9,800 to 3,300 ft) with the speed around 470 km/h (290 mph). Pilots disliked the aircraft, as the drag from the bomb cradle significantly hampered performance.

Fifty were ordered in mid-1941 but after 40 had been delivered, 50 kg (110 lb) bomb racks were added under each wing. The wing racks could also mount 100L drop tanks, allowing the 81 to be used as long-range fighters.

=== IAR 81C ===
The final stage in the IAR 80's wartime history was the 81C. This version changed the guns once again, this time to the Mauser MG 151/20 which was replacing the MG FF/M in German service and had just been released for Romanian use. The order for the 81C was placed in May 1942, predating the second order of the 81As.

The first order for 100 airframes was delivered, like all of the prior updates to the 81 series, with the centreline bomb rack removed to be used as fighters. An additional order for 35 was placed in February 1943, and then another 15 in January 1944. These aircraft were primarily to replace losses in earlier models, while production of the Bf 109G ramped up.

=== IAR 80M ===
By 1944 the ARR fighter units included examples of 80A, B and C models, as well as 81, 81Cs. In order to up-gun the earlier fighters as well as simplify logistics and maintenance, an upgrade program was started in mid-1944 to bring all existing airframes to the 81C armament suite of two MG 151/20s and two FN 7.92s. The resulting A and B models of the 80 and 81s would become the 80M and 81M respectively, although at this point there were no dive bombers in use. It is unclear how many conversions were completed.

=== IAR 80DC ===
IAR 80s remained in service until 1949, when they were replaced by La-9s and Il-10s. Those airframes with the lowest hours were modified by removing a fuel tank in front of the cockpit and adding a second seat, resulting in a trainer designated the IAR 80DC. These were used for only a short time before being replaced by Yak-11s and Yak-18s in late 1952.

== Further development ==
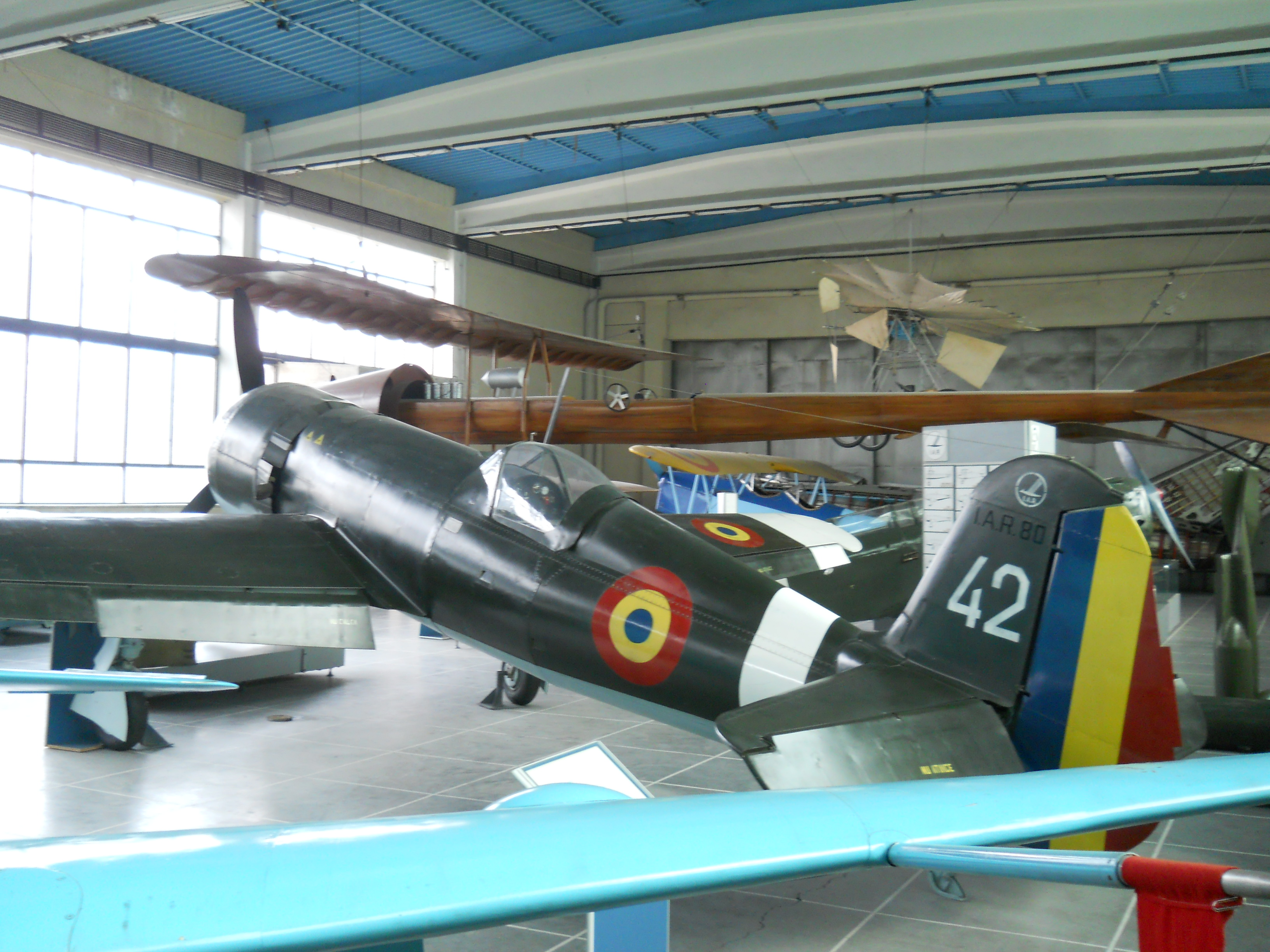
IAR 80 replica at the National Military Museum

IAR realized that the Mistral Major was at the limits of its development potential even by the middle of 1941, when the 1000A model reached the same ultimate output as the original Gnome-Rhône engines. An ongoing program to fit the IAR 80 with a more powerful engine had been in the works for most of the design's lifetime, but this proved to be a fruitless endeavor.

The most obvious choice for a new engine would have been the BMW 801 used in the Focke-Wulf Fw 190. This engine produced a full 600 hp (450 kW) more power, and although it was heavier, it was of roughly the same size as the IAR K14. IAR engineers estimated that a BMW powered IAR 80 would have a maximum speed of at least 600 km/h (370 mph). But the Germans were unable to supply the engine as every example coming off the line was needed for installation in a German airframe. Licensed production was likewise out of the question, the engine production was in the midst of being ramped and the demand was so great that not even one set of jigs could be spared.

In the spring of 1941, IAR 80 no. 13 was fitted with a Daimler-Benz DB 601Aa engine borrowed from a Bf 109E. A flight test was carried out on 21 April 1941, but due to the strong vibrations, the pilot barely managed to bring it to the ground. Development was abandoned after this test flight, and was never flown again. Other tests were carried out with a 1,475 PS (1,085 kW; 1,455 hp) Daimler-Benz DB 605A fitted to IAR 81C no. 326 in the summer of 1943. According to the test reports, the aircraft's performance was greatly improved, however due to difficulties in producing the engine and the Germans not having engines for sale, the project did not materialize.

== Operational history ==
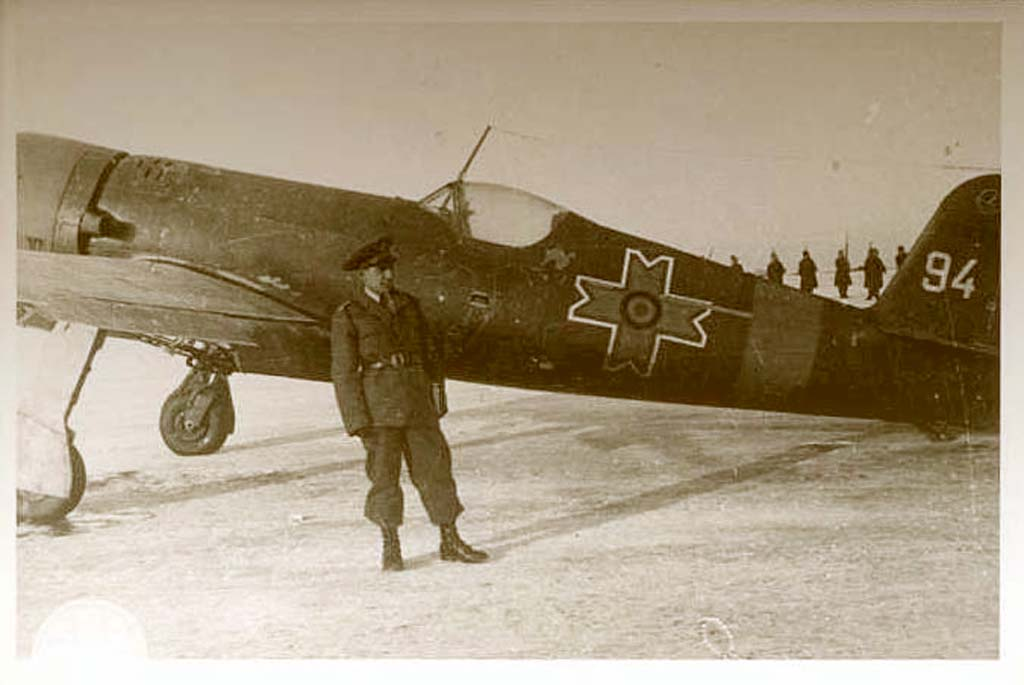
"Hero shot" of an IAR-80 pilot with his aircraft

When Operation Barbarossa started, the IAR 80 equipped Esc. 41, 59 and 60 of Grupul 8 Vânătoare (8th Fighter Group), part of the Gruparea Aerienă de Luptă (GAL), that were tasked to support the Romanian 3rd and 4th Armies deployed at the southern flank of the Eastern Front. 8th Group was the only unit assigned a pure fighter role, while 5th and 7th Groups, equipped with German aircraft (Heinkel He 112s and Messerschmitt Bf 109s) were employed primarily as fighter-bombers and bomber escorts.

On 22 June 1941, during the first day of the offensive, the IAR 80 patrols had their baptism of fire, achieving a single aerial victory (claimed by Sublocotenent aviator Ioan Mihăilescu of Esc 60 Vânătoare, a future ace) during four separate air combats. However, at least four IARs force landed with battle damage, while another two suffered engine trouble. By the end of 1941, 20 IAR 80/81s had been lost in combat or accidents. During 1942 the Romanian aviation industry reached its highest output so that the Royal Romanian Air Force could be re-equipped as follows: Esc. 47, 48 and 52 (Grupul 9 Vânătoare), Esc. 43, 44 and 50 (Grupul 3 Vânătoare) and Esc. 41, 42 and 60 (Grupul 8 Vânătoare) received the new IAR 80A. Esc. 53 also replaced its Hurricanes with the IAR 80A, while Grupul 6 Bopi (Bombardament în Picaj - Dive Bombing) re-equipped with the IAR 81.

In June 1942, the operational IAR fighter forces on the eastern front, combined into the Flotilla 2 Vânătoare consisted of Grupul 8 Vânătoare, commanded by Cdr. Lt Col E. Pîrvulescu, and included Escadrila 41, Escadrila 42 and Escadrila 60 with 12 IAR 80As each. During the Battle of Stalingrad, on 12 September, the 8th Fighter Group's IAR 80Bs (along with the 7th Fighter Group's Bf 109s) claimed to have shot down seven Yaks but they lost two IARs. Grupul 8 moved at the end of September, to Karpovka, joining Grupul 7, equipped with Bf 109s. On 12 and 13 December, Grupul 6 used its IAR 81s to support the German counterattack by the Panzergruppe Hoth of the Heeresgruppe Don, from Kotelnikovo towards Stalingrad.

In the summer of 1943 the ARR's IAR 80s were transferred to Romania for air defense duties, where they were used in combat against the United States Air Force. USAAF attacks were directed at the oil refineries installation around Ploiești, in particular. On 1 August 1943 the IAR 80 faced the Consolidated B-24 Liberator heavy bomber for the first time. There were 178 B-24s from 9th USAAF, part of Operation Tidal Wave. The IAR 80Bs of Escadrila 61 and 62 of Grupul 6 Vânătoare, as well as IAR 80Cs from the newly formed Escadrila 45 of Grupul 4 Vânătoare, together with the Bf 109Gs from Esc. 53 and Bf 110s from the Romanian night fighter squadron, dived on the low-flying, four-engined bombers, belonging to five USAAF bomber groups (the 44th, 93rd, 98th, 376th and 389th). The Americans lost – in combat or on the way back – 51 bombers. Only 89 reached their bases, of which only 31 were serviceable for a mission the next day. The Romanian pilots claimed 25 certain and probable victories for just two losses, one IAR 80B and one Bf 110C. According to Romanian statistics, IARs and Messerschmitts were confirmed as having shot down ten B-24s, with two probables.

On 21 April 1944, IAR 81Cs of the 1st, 2nd, and 6th Fighter Groups took off to intercept B-17 and B-24 bombers which were targeting the Bucharest marshalling yard. While attacking the bombers, the Romanian fighters were engaged at high altitude by the escorting P-51 Mustangs of the 31st Fighter Group. In the aftermath of the air battle, the ARR lost 14 IAR 80s and 11 pilots were killed, while the Americans reported 10 aircraft lost.

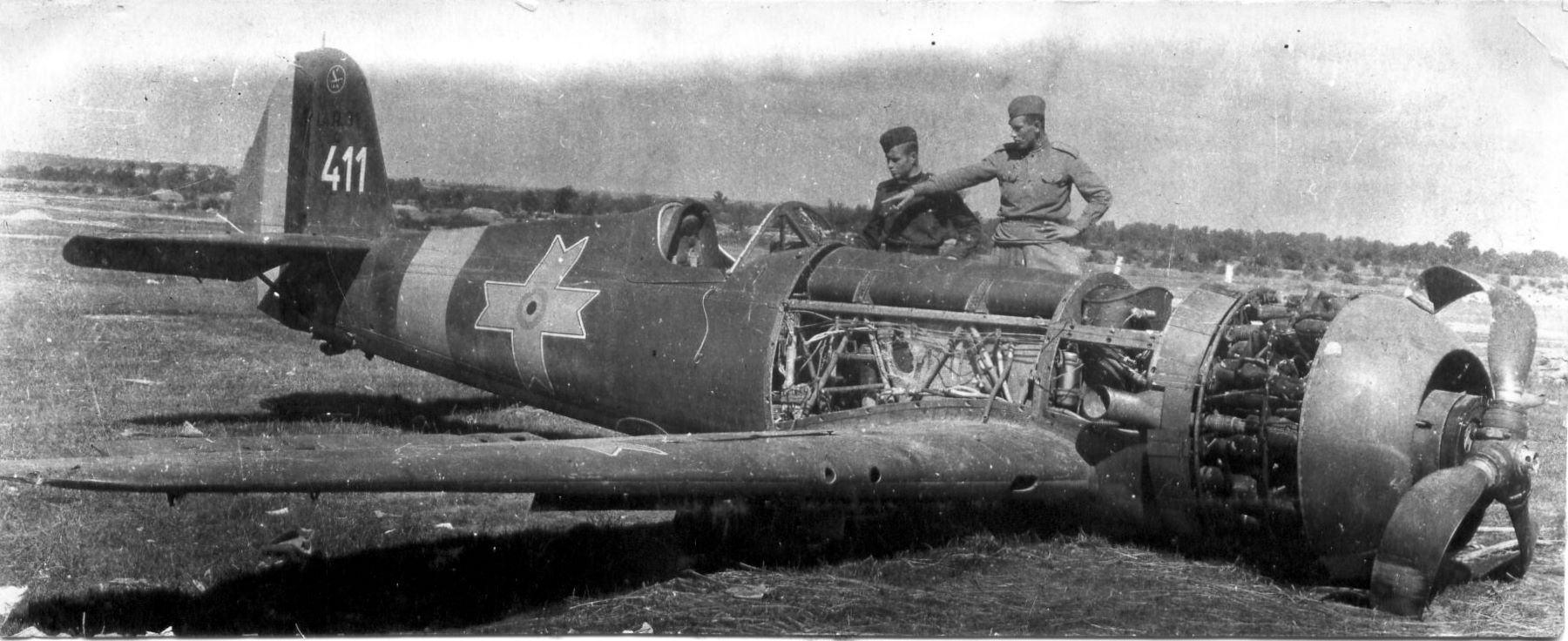
Abandoned IAR 81C no. 411 being inspected by Soviets

On 10 June 1944, IAR 80s took part in a major air battle when the USAAF attacked Ploiești with 38 P-38 Lightnings of the 82nd Fighter Group carrying one bomb each, escorted by 39 Lightnings of the 1st and 82 FGs. The IAR 81Cs from Grupul 6, as well as the German fighters from I./JG 53 and 2./JG 77, intercepted the large American formation. Romanian pilot Dan Vizanty, commander of Grupul 6, recalled later:

"Our Lightning attack came as a complete surprise to the Americans. Our attack was so quick that not one of the 100 (sic) American aircraft managed to fire a single shot at our aircraft parked on the ground. Everything happened between ground level and about 2,000 meters (6,600 feet), and was total confusion. I was excited and proud of my "mills", the IAR 80s, which, thanks to their extraordinary agility, remained victorious in the air. I saw their crazy dives, quick rolls, reverse turns and inverted flying, always with just brief burst of fire to save ammunition. It was an incredible sight, but also a drama for the Lightning pilots, who, at this low altitude, were inferior to the ever-present, nimble IAR 80s".

The USAAF lost 22 P-38s on that day, of which 9 were shot down by the IARs. The Romanians claimed 24 victories, suffering three losses. The Americans claimed 11 victories.

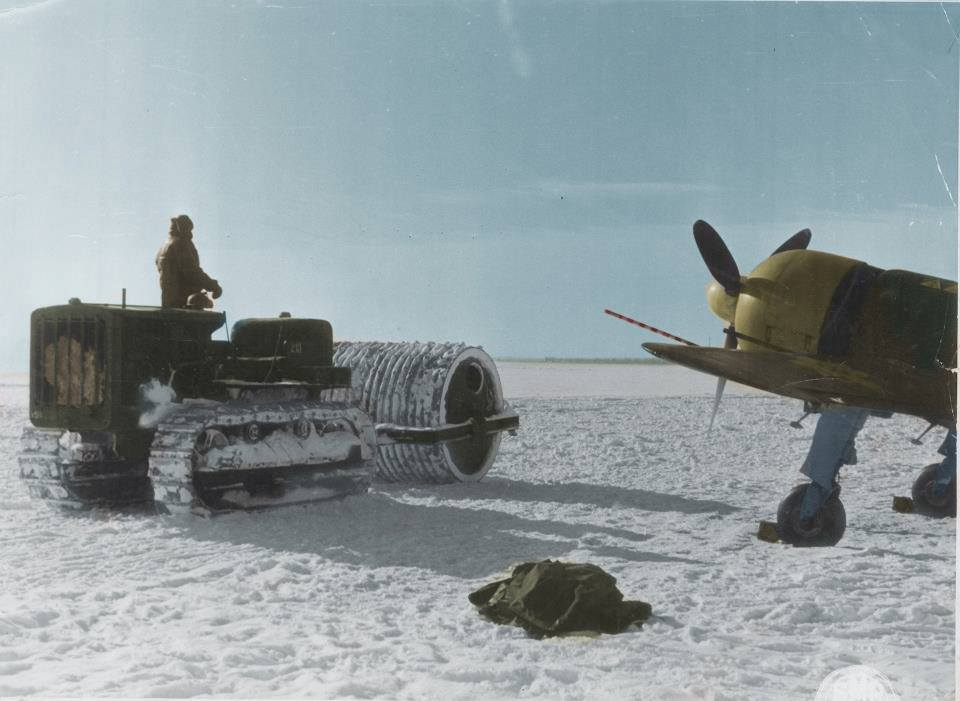
IAR 80 during the winter on the eastern front

The American account of this battle conflicts significantly with the Romanian one. Fighter pilot Herbert "Stub" Hatch, who took part in the dogfight, wrote that his flight of 16 P-38s, the 71st Fighter Squadron, was challenged by a large formation of Romanian IAR 81C fighters that he misidentified as Focke-Wulf Fw 190s. According to Hatch, the fight took place at and below 300 feet (100 m) in a narrow valley. Hatch saw two IAR 81Cs hit the ground after taking fire from his guns, and his fellow pilots confirmed three more kills from his guns. Three of his victories were confirmed by gun camera, while the other two by his wingman, making Hatch an ace in a day. However, the outnumbered 71st Fighter Squadron lost nine aircraft. The Americans never again repeated the P-38 dive-bombing mission profile over Romania. But during 1944 USAAF aircraft appeared over Romania in more significant numbers. Many air combats occurred and by the time of their last encounter with the USAAF on 3 July 1944, pilots of Grupul 6 vânătoare had submitted 87 confirmed and ten unconfirmed claims. Casualties among the Romanian fighter pilots quickly mounted too. The three IAR 80/81 groups (the 1st, 2nd and 6th) in a period of less than four months – known as the "American Campaign" – had at least 32 IAR pilots killed in action, including 11 aces. These losses exceeded the number of casualties suffered in the previous two and a half years of fighting against the Soviets. Because of heavy losses, all IAR 80/81 units were withdrawn from combat against Americans in July 1944 and IAR pilots started to convert to the more modern Bf 109G-6s.

== Surviving aircraft ==
After the Soviet occupation of Romania, all remaining IAR 80s were replaced with Soviet designs and scrapped. No complete original examples are known to survive. A static replica of the IAR 80 rebuilt post war after the fall of Communism and painted in its 1941–1944 original colors was shown at the Mihail Kogălniceanu airshow, near Constanța. The IAR 80 replica can be seen at the Romanian National Military Museum in Bucharest. Another IAR 80 static replica can be found at the National Aviation Museum at the defunct Pipera Airport in Bucharest, which was rebuilt from IAR 80DC two-seat trainer parts. As of 2017 few attempts have been initiated to produce an airworthy accurate replica of the IAR 80 based on existing factory documentation and recovered components. A flying IAR 80 is still to be seen. Since 2020, the Fly Again volunteer association is currently developing an airworthy replica of the IAR 80 which will be named IAR 80FA (Fly Again) and will carry the board number 451, where the original production left off.

== In fiction ==
The IAR 80 appears in the historical fiction book Eighty Flights of a Not-So-Much-Of-A-Fighter-Pilot by Cătălin Pogaci.

== Operators ==
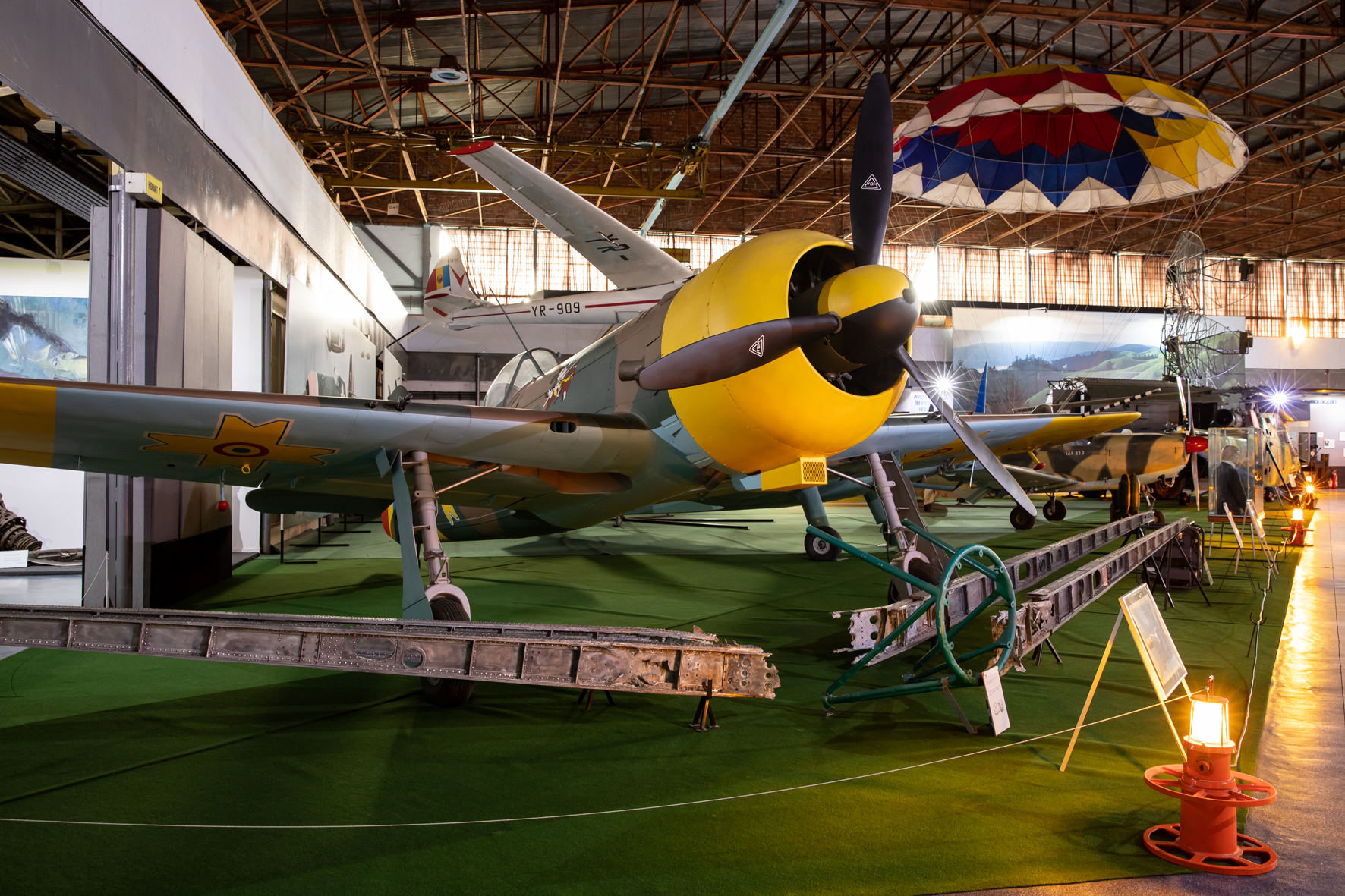
IAR 80 replica at the National Aviation Museum in the markings of the 53rd Fighter Squadron

Romania

- Royal Romanian Air Force
  - 1st Fighter Group received IAR 80C aircraft in October 1943.
    - 43rd Fighter Squadron
    - 63rd Fighter Squadron
    - 64th Fighter Squadron
  - 2nd Fighter Group
    - 65th Fighter Squadron
    - 66th Fighter Squadron
    - 67th Fighter Squadron
    - 50th Fighter Squadron
  - 3rd Fighter Group received IAR 80A aircraft in August 1942.
    - 41st Fighter Squadron
    - 44th Fighter Squadron
    - 49th Fighter Squadron based at Târgșor.
  - 4th Fighter Group received IAR 80A aircraft in July 1942. In early 1943 was reequipped with IAR 80Cs.
    - 45th Fighter Squadron based at Cetatea Albă.
    - 46th Fighter Squadron based at Cetatea Albă.
  - 5th Fighter Group operated IAR 81C aircraft.
    - 51st Dive Bomber Squadron
    - 52nd Fighter Squadron
    - 53rd Fighter Squadron operated IAR 80A aircraft in late 1942.
  - 6th Fighter Group started training on IAR 80 aircraft since 27 September 1941 and in January 1942 conversion to IAR 81 begun.
    - 59th Fighter Squadron
    - 60th Fighter Squadron
    - 61st Dive Bomber Squadron
    - 62nd Dive Bomber Squadron
  - 7th Fighter Group received IAR 81C aircraft in October 1943.
    - 56th Fighter Squadron
    - 57th Fighter Squadron
    - 58th Fighter Squadron
  - 8th Fighter Group received first IAR 80 aircraft in February 1941. In April 1943 was transformed into 8th Assault Group and reequipped with Henschel Hs 129Bs.
    - 41st Fighter Squadron
    - 42/52nd Fighter Squadron received first IAR 80s aircraft in July 1941.
    - 59th Fighter Squadron received first six IAR 80s aircraft in September 1941.
  - 9th Fighter Group was formed in April 1942 and received IAR 80A aircraft. In April 1943 unit was reequipped with Bf 109Gs.
    - 47th Fighter Squadron
    - 48th Fighter Squadron
    - 56th Fighter Squadron
- Romanian Air Force – Postwar.

== Specifications (IAR 81C) ==
IAR-80 3-view drawings

Data from

General characteristics

- Crew: 1
- Length: 8.97 m (29 ft 5 in)
- Wingspan: 11 m (36 ft 1 in)
- Height: 3.600 m (11 ft 10 in)
- Wing area: 17 m^{2} (180 sq ft)
- Empty weight: 2,200 kg (4,850 lb)
- Max takeoff weight: 3,030 kg (6,680 lb)
- Fuel capacity: 330 kg (730 lb)
- Powerplant: 1 × IAR K14 IVc32 1000A1 14-cylinder two-row air-cooled radial piston engine, 750 kW (1,000 hp)
- Propellers: 3-bladed constant-speed propeller

Performance

- Maximum speed: 510 km/h (320 mph, 280 kn) 524 Km/h at 5,350 m in tests of IAR 80 Nr.2 on 16.12.1940
- Range: 730 km (450 mi, 390 nmi) on internal fuel only
- Ferry range: 1,330 km (830 mi, 720 nmi) with extra fuel tanks
- Service ceiling: 10,000 m (33,000 ft)
- Time to altitude: 4'41" – 7'00" to 5,000 meters (depending on variant)
- Wing loading: 132.35 kg/m^{2} (27.11 lb/sq ft)

Armament

- Guns: 2 × 20 mm (0.787 in) MG 151/20 cannon and 2 × 7.92 mm (0.312 in) FN-Browning machine guns mounted in the inner portion of the wing
- Bombs: one 250 kg (550 lb) SC250 bomb under the fuselage and/or 2 × 50 kg (110 lb) SC50 bombs under the wings.

== See also ==
Aircraft of comparable role, configuration, and era

- Avia B-135
- Bloch MB.152
- Curtiss P-36 Hawk
- Dewoitine D.520
- Fiat G.50
- Hawker Hurricane
- Heinkel He 112
- Macchi MC.200
- MÁVAG Héja
- Messerschmitt Bf 109
- Mitsubishi A6M Zero
- Nakajima Ki-43
- PZL.50 Jastrząb
- Reggiane Re.2000
- Rogožarski IK-3
- Seversky P-35
- Weiss Manfréd WM-23 Ezüst Nyíl

Related lists

- List of aircraft of World War II
- List of fighter aircraft
