= Daimler-Benz DB 605 =

German aircraft engine

DB 605
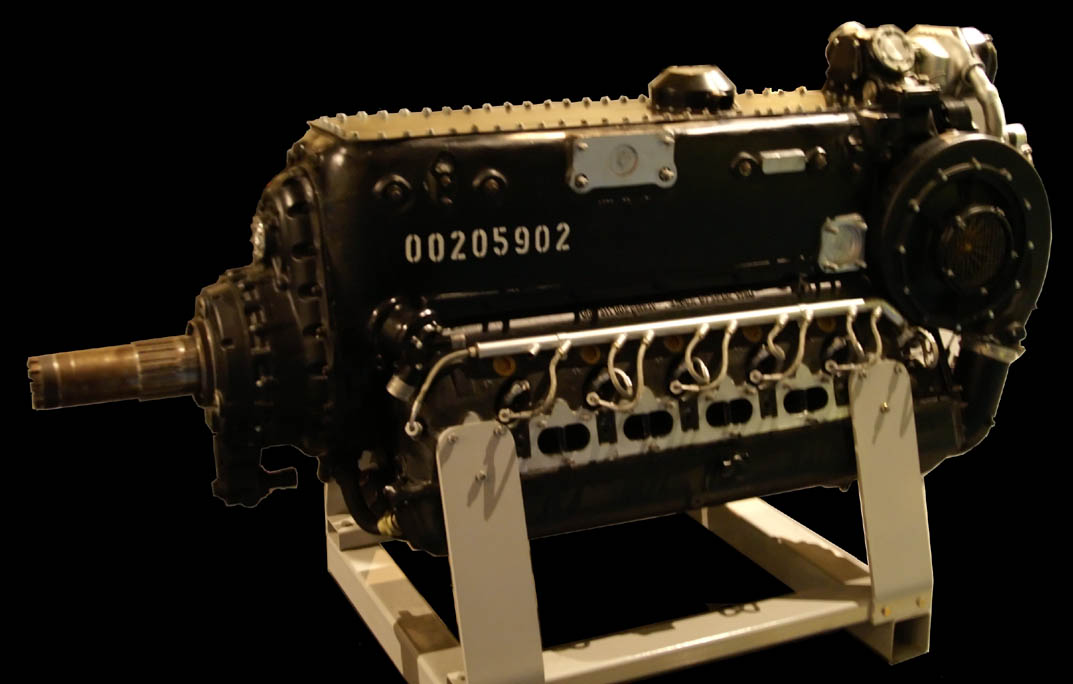
- A DB 605 Engine at the Royal Air Force Museum London in Hendon, London.
- Type: Piston V12 aircraft engine
- National origin: Germany
- Manufacturer: Daimler-Benz
- First run: 1940s
- Major applications: Messerschmitt Bf 109G; Messerschmitt Bf 110G
- Number built: 42,400
- Developed from: Daimler-Benz DB 601

The Daimler-Benz DB 605 is a German aircraft engine built during World War II. Developed from the DB 601, the DB 605 was used from 1942 to 1945 in the Messerschmitt Bf 109 fighter, and the Bf 110 and Me 210C heavy fighters.

The DB 610, a pair of DB 605s geared to turn a single output shaft that replaced the similar DB 606, was used in the A-3 and all A-5 variants of Germany's only operational heavy bomber, the Heinkel He 177A.

License-built versions of the DB 605 were used in the Macchi C.205, Fiat G.55, Reggiane 2005 and some other Italian aircraft. It was also used in the Swedish SAAB B 18B and initially in the pusher-design SAAB J 21. Approximately 42,400 DB 605s of all kinds were built.

== Design and development ==
The primary differences between the 605 and 601 were greater displacement, higher revolutions, higher compression ratio and a more powerful supercharger. Engineers determined that the cylinders could be bored out to a larger diameter without seriously affecting the strength of the existing block. The change was small, increasing the cylinder bore from the 601's 150 mm to the 605's 154 mm, but this increased the overall displacement from 33.9 litres to 35.7. Altered valve timing increased the inlet period and improved the scavenging to give greater volumetric efficiency at higher speeds, which improved the maximum allowable RPM from 2,600 in the 601 to 2,800 in the 605. The combination of these changes raised power output from 1,350 PS (1,332 hp) to 1,475 PS (1,455 hp). Engine weight increased from 700 to 756 kg.

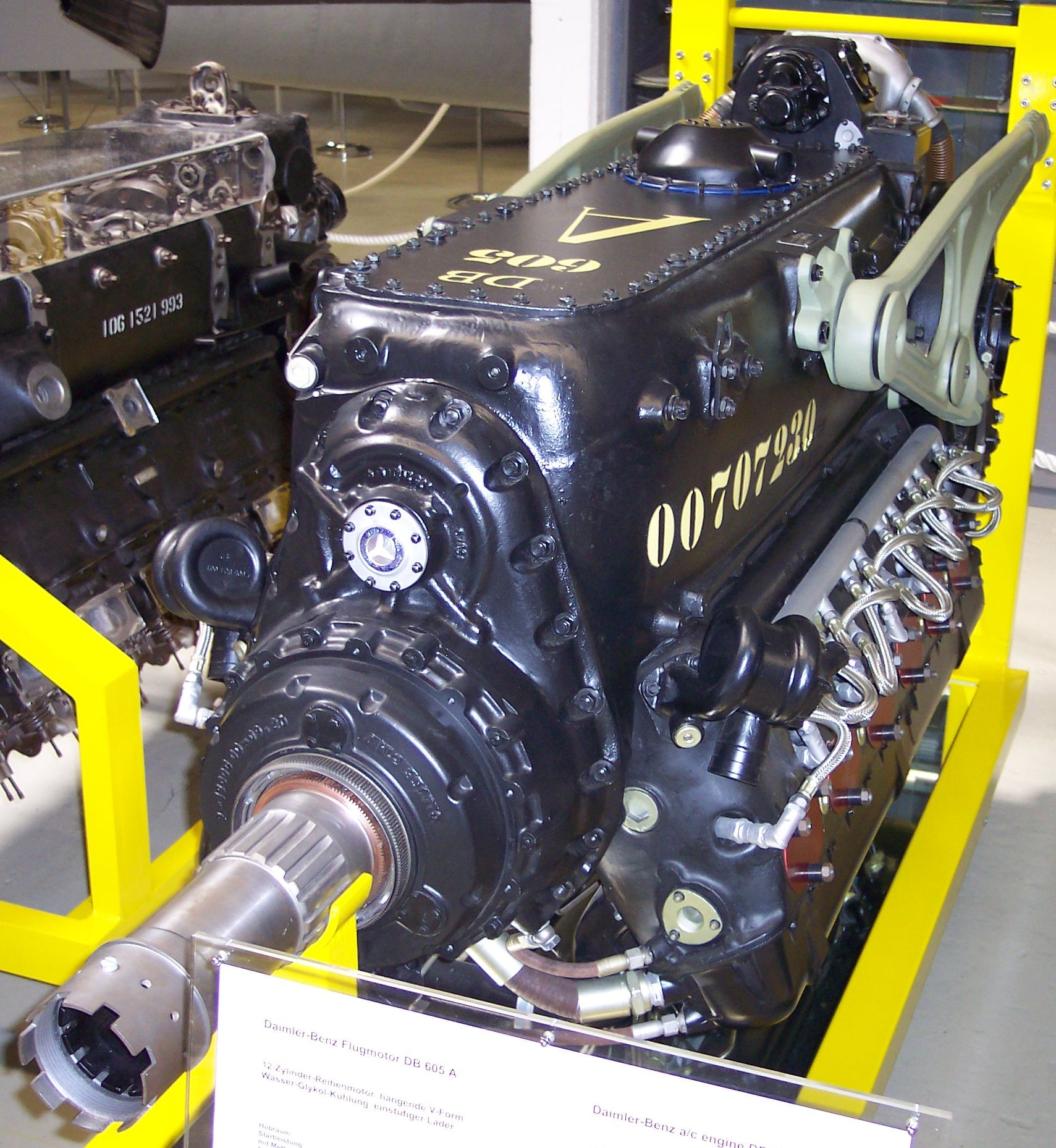
The DB 605 is an inverted V-12. Pictured, a DB 605A

In other ways the engine was essentially identical to the 601, being an inverted V-12 (with the crankshaft above the cylinders). Both used dual Bosch magnetos firing twin spark plugs for ignition. Bosch direct fuel injection was powered by a pump supplying up to 90 bar (1300 psi). The oil system used three pumps with a separate 35-litre oil tank. The supercharger was advanced for the era in that it used a barometrically controlled hydraulic clutch (fluid coupling) which allowed the system automatically to compensate for changes in altitude.

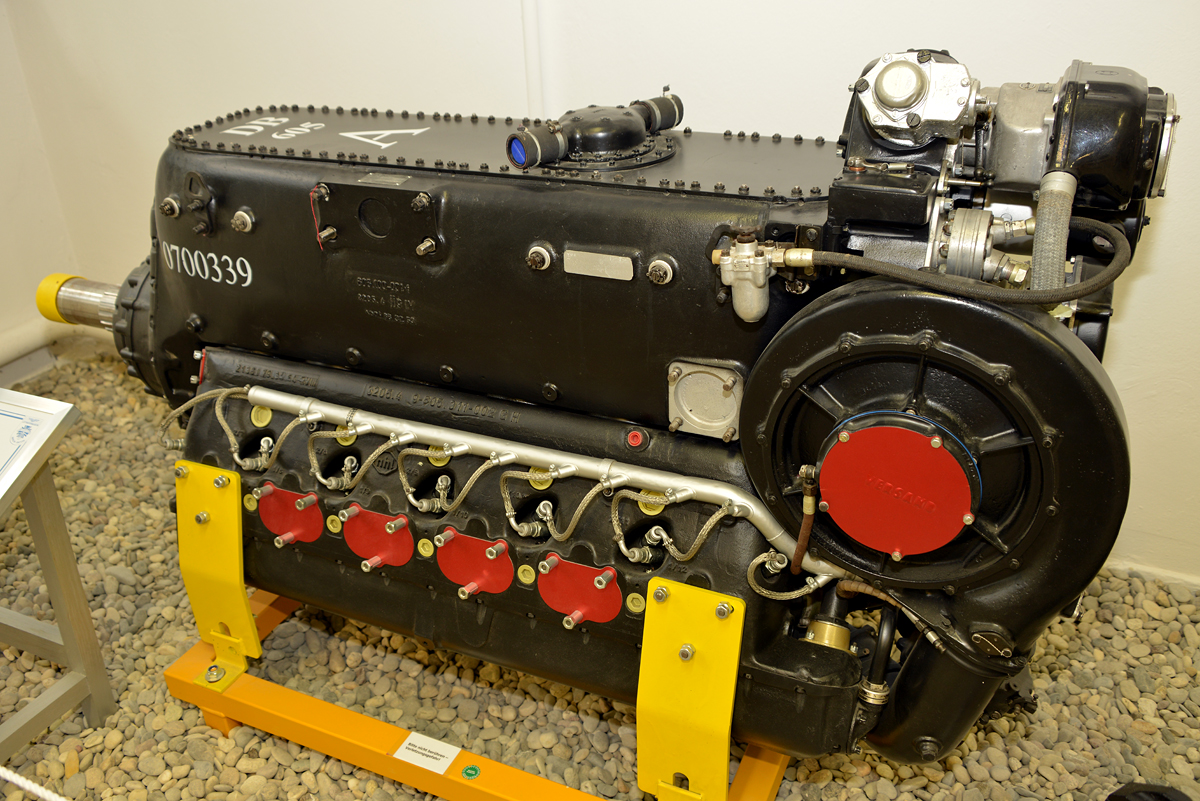
The DB 605 was supercharged. Pictured, a DB 605A.

One major design difference was the switch from ball bearings to plain bearings which, when combined with increasingly poor grades of lubricants, led to serious problems in service, including engine fires; initially, for example, the use of emergency power was forbidden. Although Daimler-Benz redesigned the bearings and added oil slingers and their associated coolers, the RLM considered the DB 605 to be a "sick engine" and the problems had not been fully resolved by the end of the war.

Along with bearing difficulties, the DB 605 suffered particularly badly from the materials shortages in wartime Germany. From the outbreak of war onwards critical shortages of elements such as nickel and cobalt meant that the DB 605 had its exhaust valves reduced in nickel content from about 13.5% to 8%. This resulted in their becoming insufficiently corrosion resistant, and they began to scale in use. This scale then caused pre-ignition, which led to catastrophic detonation and eventually engine failure. This was the primary reason that the full 1.42 ata manifold pressure was not permitted, although the problems occurred for a long time before the official order restricting the power level was given (Jumo and BMW suffered exactly the same problem for some time). This was eventually fixed by applying a very heavy chrome plating to the exhaust valves, which rendered them just sufficiently resistant to scaling while still using less of a critical element than the original nickel alloy. BMW had developed this plating technique first, as the BMW 801 in the Fw 190 had also been suffering from a spate of detonation induced engine failures.

Like the 601, the 605 was designed to run on "B4" fuel with an octane rating of 87. In 1944 a series of newer engines was introduced, allowing the engine to run on the 100 octane "C3" fuel and optionally including fittings for various optional power-boosting agent dispensing systems, such as the MW50 methanol-water injection system, and GM-1 nitrous oxide injection system. The DB 605AM, running initially on C3 and MW-50, saw power improved to 1,800 PS (1775 hp) for takeoff. In mid-1944, the requirement for C3 was dropped and standard B4 fuel with MW-50 was used. The DB 605AS(M) improved the maximum rated altitude by using a larger supercharger taken from the DB 603 but was otherwise similar to the A(M). The DB 605ASB's takeoff power was also rated at 1,800 PS (1,775 hp), while maintaining the high-altitude performance of the ASM. The final version of the A-series was the DB 605ASC of 1945, which improved takeoff power to 2,000 PS (1,973 hp).

As early as 1942 Daimler had also been working on an upgraded D-series engine that could run on either C2 or C3 fuel. The first of these, which appeared in late 1944, was a small series of DB 605DM, followed by the main production series, the DB 605DB/DC. These engines were fitted with an adjustable screw stop which allowed the use of either B4 fuel with MW-50, or C-3 fuel without MW-50, in which case the engine was designated DB 605DB, or the use of C-3 fuel with MW-50, in which case the engine was given the -DC suffix instead. In its DB-suffix form the engine generated 1,800 PS (1,775 hp) for take-off at 1.8 ata, while the DC was capable of 2,000 PS (1,973 hp) at 1.98 ata. If MW-50 was not available for use with the B4 fuel the throttle was limited to 1.45 ata for the entire flight. Thus, this series was ideally suited to catering for the chaotic fuel supply situation prevalent during the last months of the Third Reich. These engines were mainly used in the Bf 109G-10 and K-4 series.

An unusual application of the DB 605 was its installation in a captured Supermarine Spitfire. In November 1942, Spitfire VB EN830 NX-X of 131 Squadron made a forced landing in a turnip field in German-occupied Jersey. The plane was repaired by German forces and re-engined with a DB 605A, amongst other modifications. The aircraft was operated by the Luftwaffe until 14 August 1944, when it was destroyed during a USAAF bombing raid.

== Variants ==
Production versions

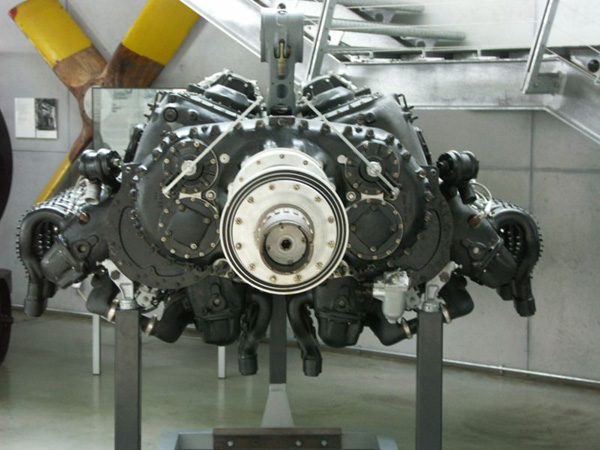
DB 610 gearbox end, showing side by side DB 605 V12s

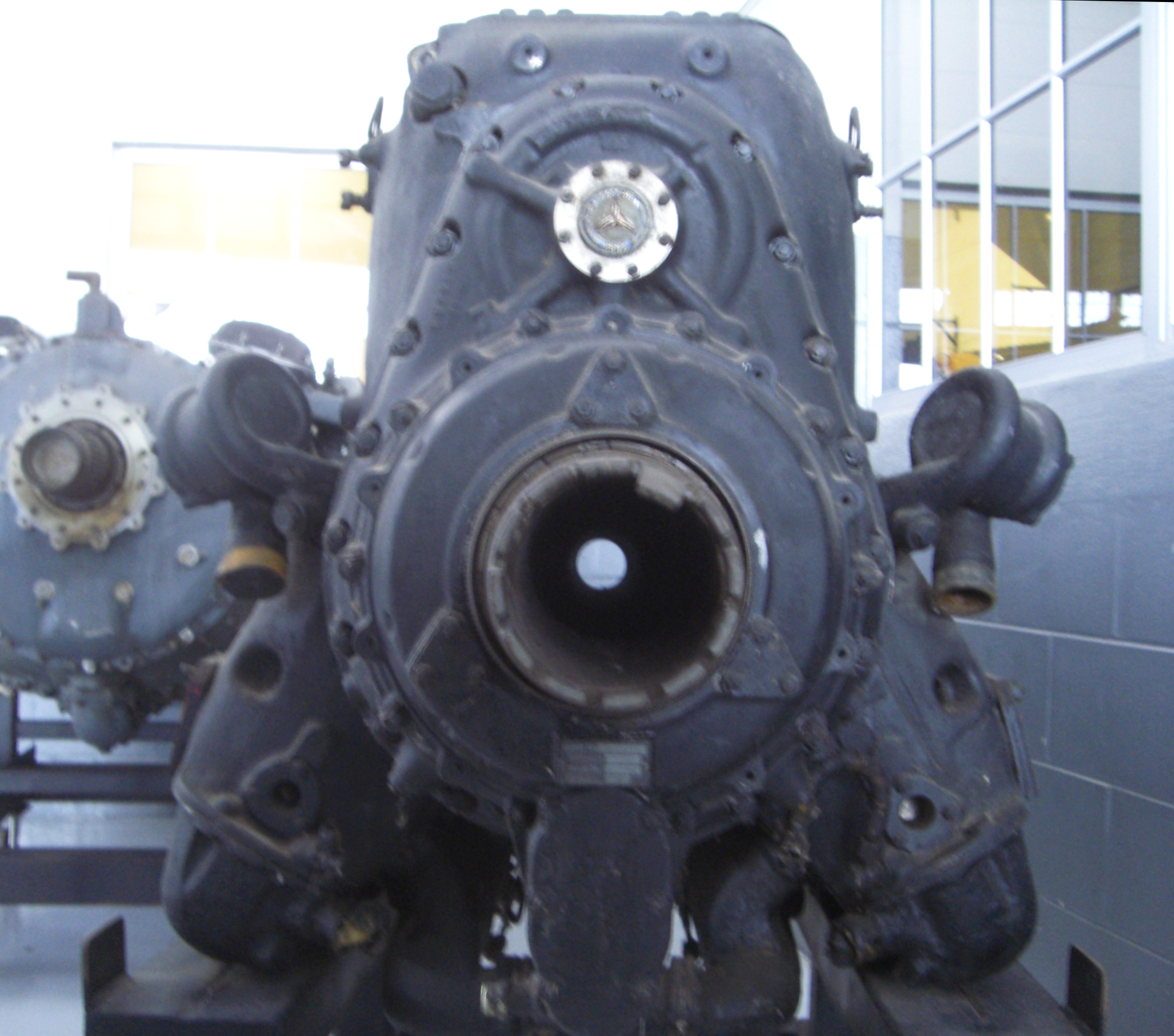
Daimler-Benz DB 605, front view of hollow propeller shaft for 20mm and 30mm motorkanone

DB 605A
Standard fighter engine, up to 1475 PS, B4 fuel
DB 605AM
605A with MW-50 system, up to 1800 PS, C3 fuel
DB 605AS
Altitude optimized version of 605A using the larger DB 603 supercharger, up to 1435 PS, B4 fuel
DB 605ASM
605 AS with MW-50 system, up to 1800 PS, C3 fuel
DB 605ASB/605AB
late-war version, first version up to 1850 PS, later reduced to 1800 PS, B4 fuel with MW-50 or C3 fuel without MW-50
DB 605ASC
late-war version, up to 2000 PS with MW-50, C3 fuel
DB 605B
Same as 605 A but for use in twin-engined aircraft like Messerschmitt Bf 110, Me 210 (different prop/gear ratio)
DB 605BS
proposed version for twin-engined aircraft, derived from DB 605 AS
DB 605DB
Improved 605 DM, standard MW-50 equipment, first version up to 1850 PS, later reduced to 1800 PS, B4 fuel with MW-50 or C3 fuel without MW-50
DB 605DC
Improved 605 DM, standard MW-50 equipment, up to 2000 PS, C3 fuel
DB 605DM
First DB 605 D version, standard MW-50 equipment, up to 1700 PS
DB 605E
proposed version for twin-engined aircraft, derived from DB 605 D
DB 605T
Developed to drive the HZ Anlage supercharger for the Henschel Hs 130
DB 605 L
Similar to 605 D but with two-stage supercharger, 1700 PS, development stopped in December 1944
Fiat RA.1050 R.C.58 Tifone
Licence built / developed DB 605A-1 engines, built by Fiat in Italy.
DB 610
Two DB 605s "coupled" (geared together) as a "power system" (71.53L / 4364.8in^{3}), to turn a single propeller shaft, used in the Heinkel He 177A Mirror-imaged starboard component engine supercharger.

DB 610A - Propeller RH rotation - Reduction ratio 0.413: 1.

Take-off and emergency power of 2,200 kW (2,950 hp) at 2,800 rpm with 1.2 atmos. boost at sea level.

2,000 kW (2,700 hp) at 2,800 rpm with 1.42 atmos. boost at 5,700 m (18,700 ft).

Climbing 1,950 kW (2,620 hp) at 2,600 rpm with 1.3 atmos. boost at sea level.

1,900 kW (2,500 hp) at 2,600 rpm with 1.3 atmos. boost at 5,791 m (19,000 ft).

Maximum cruising 1,610 kW (2,160 hp) at 2,300 rpm with 1.15 atmos. boost at sea level.

1,610 kW (2,160 hp) at 2,300 rpm with 1.15 atmos. boost at 5,486 m (18,000 ft).

Fuel consumption 0.288 kg/kWh (0.474 lb/(hp⋅h)) (max cruise at sea level).
Total length 2.13 m (7 ft 0 in) ; width 1.62 m (5 ft 4 in); height 1.04 m (3 ft 5 in) ; weight 1,580 kg (3,483 lb).

DB 610B - Propeller LH rotation - Weight 1,580 kg (3,483 lb)
DB 610C - Propeller RH rotation

Take-off and emergency power of 2,140 kW (2,870 hp) at 2,800 rpm at sea level.

1,910 kW (2,560 hp) at 2,800 rpm at 7,620 m (25,000 ft).

Climbing 1,900 kW (2,550 hp) at 2,600 rpm at sea level.

1,800 kW (2,400 hp) at 2,600 rpm at 7,407 m (24,300 ft).

Maximum cruising 1,600 kW (2,100 hp) at 2,300 rpm at sea level.

1,520 kW (2,040 hp) at 2,300 rpm at 7,010 m (23,000 ft).

DB 610D - Propeller LH rotation

DB 616
A development of the DB 605.
DB 620
Coupled DB628 engines.
DB 621
A projected two-stage supercharged DB605
DB 625
A turbocharged DB605
DB 628
The DB 605, fitted with a two-stage supercharger, abandoned in March 1944.
IAR DB605
Licence production in Romania by Industria Aeronautică Română (IAR).

Note: All power ratings in PS (metric horsepower). Unless otherwise noted takeoff/emergency power at sea level.

== Survivors ==
A Hispano Aviación HA-1112, a license-built Messerschmitt Bf 109 G-2, has been rebuilt by EADS/Messerschmitt Foundation in Germany with a Daimler-Benz DB 605 engine.

== Applications ==
DB 605

- Caproni Campini Ca.183bis(intended)
- Fiat G.55
- IAR 471
- Macchi C.205
- Messerschmitt Bf 109G/K
- Messerschmitt Bf 110G
- Messerschmitt Me 210
- Reggiane Re.2005
- Saab 18B, T
- Saab 21
- Savoia-Marchetti SM.91
- Savoia-Marchetti SM.92
- Savoia-Marchetti SM.93
- VL Pyörremyrsky

DB 610

- Dornier Do 317B
- Heinkel He 177A-3 and A-5
- Messerschmitt Me 261V3
- SNCAC NC.3021 Belphégor

== Engines on display ==
Preserved DB 605 engines are on display at the Royal Air Force Museum, London and the National Air and Space Museum, Washington, D.C.

== Specifications (DB 605AM) ==
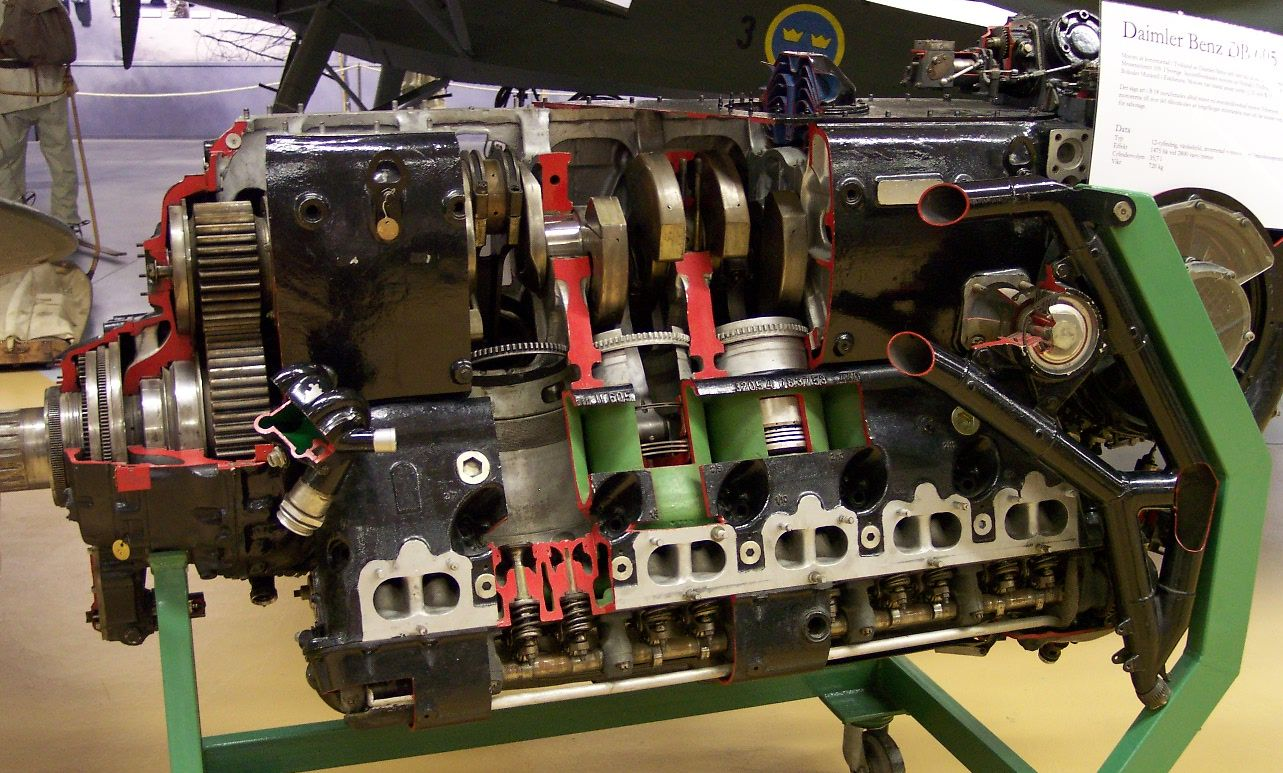
Partially sectioned DB 605

Data from Jane's

=== General characteristics ===
- Type: 12-cylinder liquid-cooled supercharged 60° inverted V aircraft piston engine
- Bore: 154 mm (6.06 in)
- Stroke: 160 mm (6.30 in)
- Displacement: 35.7 L (2,176 in^{3})
- Length: 2,158 mm (85 in)
- Width: 760 mm (30 in)
- Height: 1,037 mm (41 in)
- Dry weight: 756 kg (1,667 lb)

=== Components ===
- Valvetrain: Two intake and two sodium-cooled exhaust valves per cylinder actuated via a single overhead camshaft per cylinder bank.
- Supercharger: Single-stage variable-speed centrifugal type supercharger driven through a barometrically controlled clutch; MW50 injection into the supercharger intake.
- Fuel system: Bosch direct fuel injection
- Oil system: Dry sump with one pressure and two scavenge pumps
- Cooling system: Liquid-cooled, pressurized
- Reduction gear: 0.594:1

=== Performance ===
- Power output:
- 1,324 kW (1,800 PS/1,775 hp) at 2,800 rpm for takeoff with MW-50 injection
- 1,250 kW (1,700 PS/1,677 hp) at 2,800 rpm at 4,000 m (13,120 ft) for maximum power with MW-50 injection
- 794 kW (1,080 PS/1,065 hp) at 2,300 rpm at 5,500 m (18,000 ft) for max continuous
- Specific power: 35.0 kW/L (0.77 hp/in^{3})
- Compression ratio: 7.5/7.3:1 with 87-octane fuel; 8.5/8.3:1 with 100-octane fuel
- Power-to-weight ratio: 1.68 kW/kg (1.02 hp/lb)

== See also ==
Related development

- Daimler-Benz DB 600
- Daimler-Benz DB 601
- Daimler-Benz DB 603

Comparable engines

- Continental IV-1430
- Hispano-Suiza 12Z
- Junkers Jumo 213
- Rolls-Royce Merlin

Related lists

- List of aircraft engines
- List of aircraft engines of Germany during World War II
