= 14K =

14K may refer to:

- 14K Triad, a Chinese criminal organization
- Gnome-Rhône 14K, an aircraft engine of the 1920s and 1930s
- 14K, another term for a Fourteener mountain peak (above 14,000 feet) of the Rocky Mountains in western North America.
- 14K (Death Race), a fictional character in the Death Race film series.

== See also ==
- Carat (purity)
