= IAR 37 =

Romanian light bomber/reconnaissance aircraft

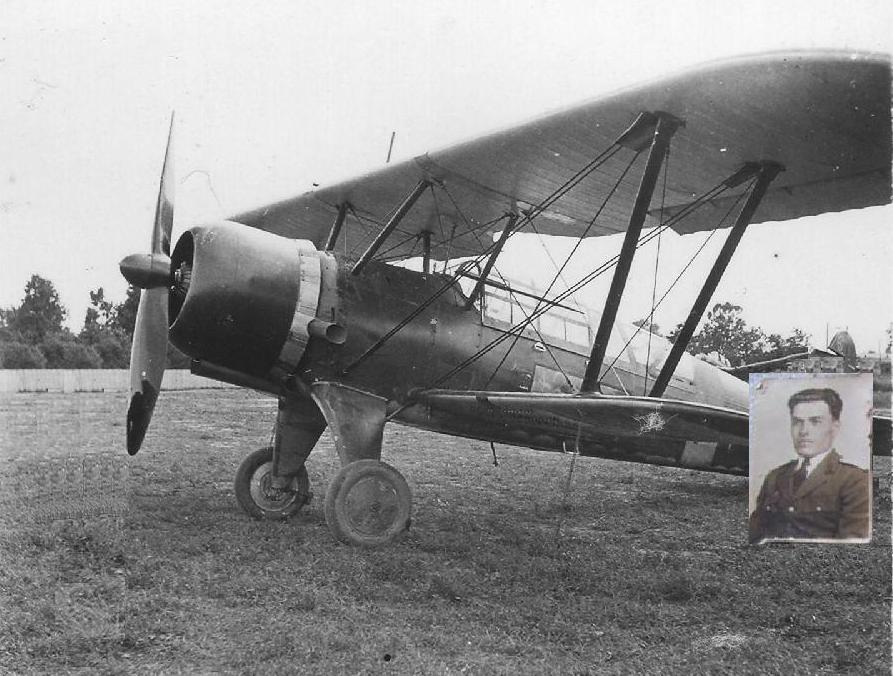

General information
- Type: Reconnaissance and light bomber
- Manufacturer: Industria Aeronautică Română; SET
- Primary users: Royal Romanian Air Force Romanian Air Force
- Number built: 380

History
- Introduction date: 1938
- First flight: 1937

The IAR 37 was a 1930s Romanian reconnaissance or light bomber aircraft built by Industria Aeronautică Română.

== Development ==
The IAR 37 prototype was flown for the first time in 1937 to meet a requirement for a tactical bombing and reconnaissance aircraft. The IAR 37 was an unequal-span single bay biplane with a fixed tailwheel landing gear and powered by a licensed copy of the Gnome-Rhône Mistral Major radial engine called the IAR K14-II C32 with 870 HP. It had room for a crew of three under a continuous glazed cockpit, pilot at the front then observer and a gunner at the rear. It had dual controls and was fitted with a locally designed bombsight and a camera. The IAR 37 entered production in 1938, but production of the engine lagged, preventing the aircraft from being completed, and it was replaced on the production line by the IAR 38, powered by the reliable BMW 132 engine. As availability and reliability of the K.14 engine improved, the incomplete IAR 37s were fitted with IAR K.14-III C36 with 930 HP to allow their completion and production was switched to the improved IAR 39, which also used the IAR K.14-IV C32 with 960HP. Total production of all three types was 380, at both IAR and SET, continuing until October 1944 with the majority being IAR 39s.

== Operational history ==
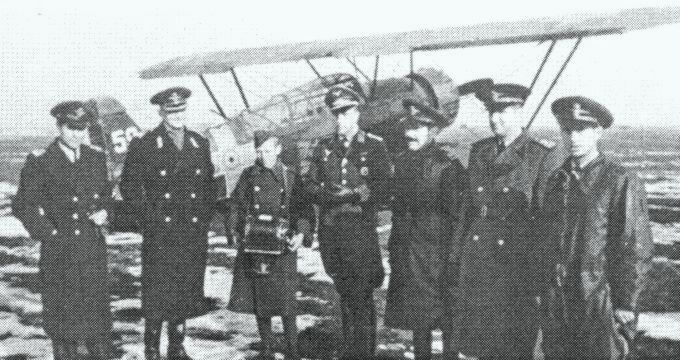
IAR 38 on the Eastern Front

The aircraft entered service with the Royal Romanian Air Force in 1938 and, by the end of the 1940, they equipped a large number of squadrons. When Romania supported the German offensive against the Soviet Union in 1941, 15 of the 18 reconnaissance squadrons were equipped with IAR biplanes. The IAR 39 was used by most of the reconnaissance squadrons involved in the 1941 offensive against the Soviet Union.

When the new post-war government was formed in 1947, a smaller number of IAR 39s were used by the new Romanian Air Force for training and liaison.

== Variants ==
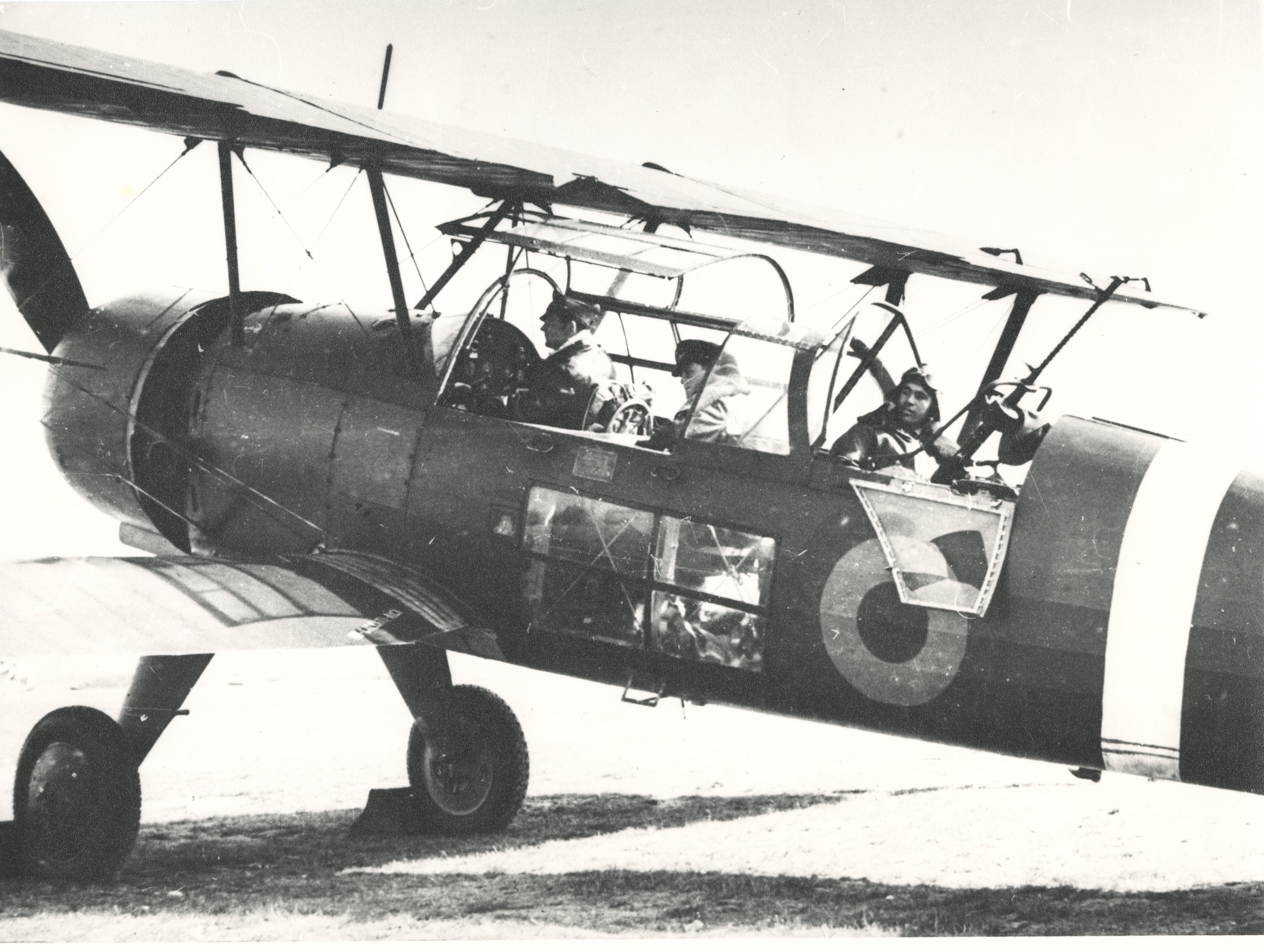
IAR 39 in Zvolen, Czechoslovakia

IAR 37
Initial production. Powered by IAR K14-II C32 - 649 kW (870 hp) engine. 50 built (IAR).
IAR 38
Powered by 522 kW (700 hp) BMW 132A engine owing to unavailability of K14. Taller tail. 75 built (IAR).
IAR 39
Revised version of IAR 38 reverting to IAR K.14-III C36 - 690 kW (930 hp) engine. 255 built (95 at IAR and 160 at SET).

== Operators ==
Kingdom of Romania

- Royal Romanian Air Force

Romania

- Romanian Air Force

== Specifications (IAR 39) ==
IAR-39, 3-side view

Data from The Illustrated Encyclopedia of Aircraft (Part Work 1982-1985), 1985, Orbis Publishing, Page 2192

General characteristics

- Crew: 3
- Length: 9.60 m (31 ft 6 in)
- Wingspan: 13.10 m (42 ft 11.75 in)
- Height: 3.99 m (13 ft 1 in)
- Wing area: 40.30 m^{2} (433.80 sq ft)
- Empty weight: 2,177 kg (4,799 lb)
- Gross weight: 3,085 kg (6,801 lb)
- Powerplant: 1 × IAR K.14-IV C32 radial piston , 716 kW (960 hp)

Performance

- Maximum speed: 336 km/h (209 mph, 182 kn)
- Range: 1,050 km (652 mi, 567 nmi)
- Service ceiling: 8,000 m (26,245 ft)

Armament

- 3 x FN (Browning) 7.92 mm (0.31 in) machine gun
- 288kg (635lb) of bombs or 144 air-grenades

== See also ==
Aircraft of comparable role, configuration, and era

- Fokker C.X
- Henschel Hs 126
- Polikarpov R-Z
- Westland Lysander

Related lists

- List of aircraft of World War II

== Bibliography ==
- Axworthy, Max. "On Three Fronts: Romania's Aircraft Industry During World War Two". Air Enthusiast, No. 56, Winter 1994. pp. 8–27. ISSN 0143-5450.
- Axworthy, Mark. "Third Axis, Fourth Ally: Romanian Armed Forces in the European War, 1941–1945". London: Arms and Armour. 1995.
- Craciunoiu, Cristian (April 2003). "Du tracteur au tracté: les planeurs DFS 230 roumains" [Towers and the Towed: Romanian DFS 230 Gliders]. Avions: Toute l'aéronautique et son histoire (in French) (121): 50–55. ISSN 1243-8650.
- Morosanu, Teodor Liviu. "Romanian Reconnaissance". Air International, April 1994, Vol 46 No 4. pp. 207–211. ISSN 0306-5634.
