= Royal Romanian Air Force =

Romanian Royal Aeronautics
- Aeronautica Regală Română
- Insignia (1941–1944)
- Active: 1924–1949
- Country: Romania
- Allegiance: King of Romania
- Type: Air Force
- Role: Aerial warfare
- Part of: Royal Romanian Army
- Garrison/HQ: Bucharest
- Nickname: ARR
- Colours: Yellow and Blue
- Engagements: World War II; Hungarian Invasion of Transylvania; Eastern Front; Western Allied campaign in Romania; Budapest offensive; Bratislava–Brno offensive; Prague offensive

Commanders
- General Inspector of the Aeronautics: Carol II of Romania (1924-1925)
- Minister of the Air and Navy: Radu Irimescu (1936-1938)

Insignia
- Roundel (1924–1941, 1944–1949)

- Insignia (1941–1944)

- Fin flash

The Air Force branch of the Royal Romanian forces in World War II was officially named the Aeronautica Regală Română (ARR, lit. 'Romanian Royal Aeronautics'), though it is more commonly referred to in English histories as the Forțele Aeriene Regale ale României (Royal Romanian Air Force, FARR), or simply Forțele Aeriene Române (Romanian Air Force). It provided support to land forces, carrying out reconnaissance and mounting air raids between other missions.

== History ==
=== Before the war ===
The ARR was established on 1 January 1924 from the previous Romanian Air Corps. This was followed by the formation of the Undersecretariat of State for the Air (Subsecretariatul de Stat al Aerului) within the Ministry of War in 1932, then by the formation of the Ministry of Air and Navy in 1936 (which existed until 1940). Between 1920 and 1940, the Romanian military aviation saw a constant development, receiving new aircraft manufactured locally of either local design or under license. The increasing number of aircraft and pilots determined the air force command to convert the four existing Aviation Groups to Air Flotillas (Air Wings) in 1929. By 1940 other flotillas were created as well.

The Royal Romanian Air Force fought against the Magyar Királyi Honvéd Légierö (Royal Hungarian Air Force) before the Hungarian annexation of Northern Transylvania in 1940. Following some Hungarian incursions into Romanian airspace, the 51st Fighter Squadron of 1st Fighter Flotilla equipped with Heinkel He 112 aircraft was brought to Cluj on the Someșeni airfield to supplement the 2nd Fighter Flotilla equipped with the older PZL P.11 fighters. On 28 August 1940, a Heinkel flown by Lieutenant Nicolae Polizu-Micșunești shot down a Hungarian Caproni Ca.135 near Berveni.

=== World War II ===
On Romania's entry into the Second World War, the ARR had 621 aircraft in its endowment. Of these, around 253 aircraft were organized into the Air Combat Group and fought alongside the Luftwaffe during the advance into Ukraine and Crimea, until the Battle of Stalingrad. The Royal Romanian Air Force also carried out some reconnaissance and patrol missions over the Black Sea alongside Bulgarian units. The ARR was tasked with the air defence of the Ploiești oil installations, and also Bucharest against Allied air raids, and to protect Axis convoys in the Black Sea. These units fought against the USAAF and RAF during their raids against Romania.

The ARR flew aircraft from Germany and Poland, with their own and other foreign aircraft, as well as captured aircraft. The main models of fighter aircraft used include the PZL P.24E, Hawker Hurricane, Heinkel He 112, Messerschmitt Bf 109E and G types, Messerschmitt Bf 110 (for night defence), IAR 80 and IAR 81 were also used. Luftwaffe interceptor units under the command of Jagdfliegerführer Rumänien were also deployed in the area. The bomber force mainly consisted of Romanian-built IAR 79s, and German supplied Heinkel He 111s, Junkers Ju 87s, and Junkers Ju 88s. Henschel Hs 129 attack aircraft were also used. From 1943, airplanes purchased from the German armed forces such as the Bf 109G, He 111, Hs 129, Ju 87 and Ju 88 maintained German ownership to better facilitate replacement of losses in combat and accidents.

==== 1944–1945 ====
After the 23 August 1944 coup d'état, Romania turned against the Axis. The ARR, now allied with the Soviet Air Forces fought against German and Hungarian forces in Transylvania and Czechoslovakia. During initial combat with the Germans over Bucharest, the ARR claimed 22 German aircraft shot down, including three Me 323 Gigant, and a further five other aircraft destroyed on the ground, while losses amounted to four Romanian aircraft in the air and 30 on the ground. The total number of German aircraft destroyed until 30 August was 59, mostly bombers. Several ships were also sunk on the Danube by Romanian He 111 and Ju 87 bombers. Between 4 September 1944 and the end of the war, 126 enemy aircraft were claimed in battle (Note: The ARR records did not differentiate between aircraft shot down by fighters or by AA fire.) to the loss of 30 aircraft. The total number of lost aircraft was around 176, mainly due to accidents. The last official victory of the ARR happened on 25 February 1945, when Adjutant Constantin Nicoară shot down a Bf 109K-4. A Soviet Yak-3 which engaged two Romanian Bf 109s together with another Yak-3, was also shot down on 4 May 1945. The victory was not officially credited in Romanian documents.

=== Post-war ===
After the return of the Romanian aviation units from the front on 12 August 1945, the ARR was reorganized by order of the Allied Control Commission. The new organization included the following units: the 1st Fighter Flotilla equipped with Bf 109 fighters, the 2nd Fighter Flotilla equipped with IAR 80/81 fighters, the 3rd Assault Flotilla with Henschel Hs 129 attack aircraft, the 4th Dive Flotilla with Junkers Ju 87 dive bombers, the 5th Heavy Bomber Flotilla with Junkers Ju 88 and IAR 79 bombers, the 6th Information Flotilla with IAR 39 reconnaissance aircraft, the Hydroaviation Flotilla, the 7th Air Transport Flotilla and the Aerostation Flotilla, all under the command of the Aviation Division. By 1946, the ARR had 953 aircraft of various types in service, however, following the conditions imposed by the Paris Peace Treaties of 1947 that number had to be reduced to 150 aircraft – 100 combat aircraft, 50 training aircraft.

In 1948, the Romanian Armed Forces began reorganizing based on the Soviet model. The Air Force was reorganized in 1949 with the establishment of the Aviation Command and the flotillas being converted to aviation regiments following the Soviet Air Force model.

== Romanian Air Aces ==
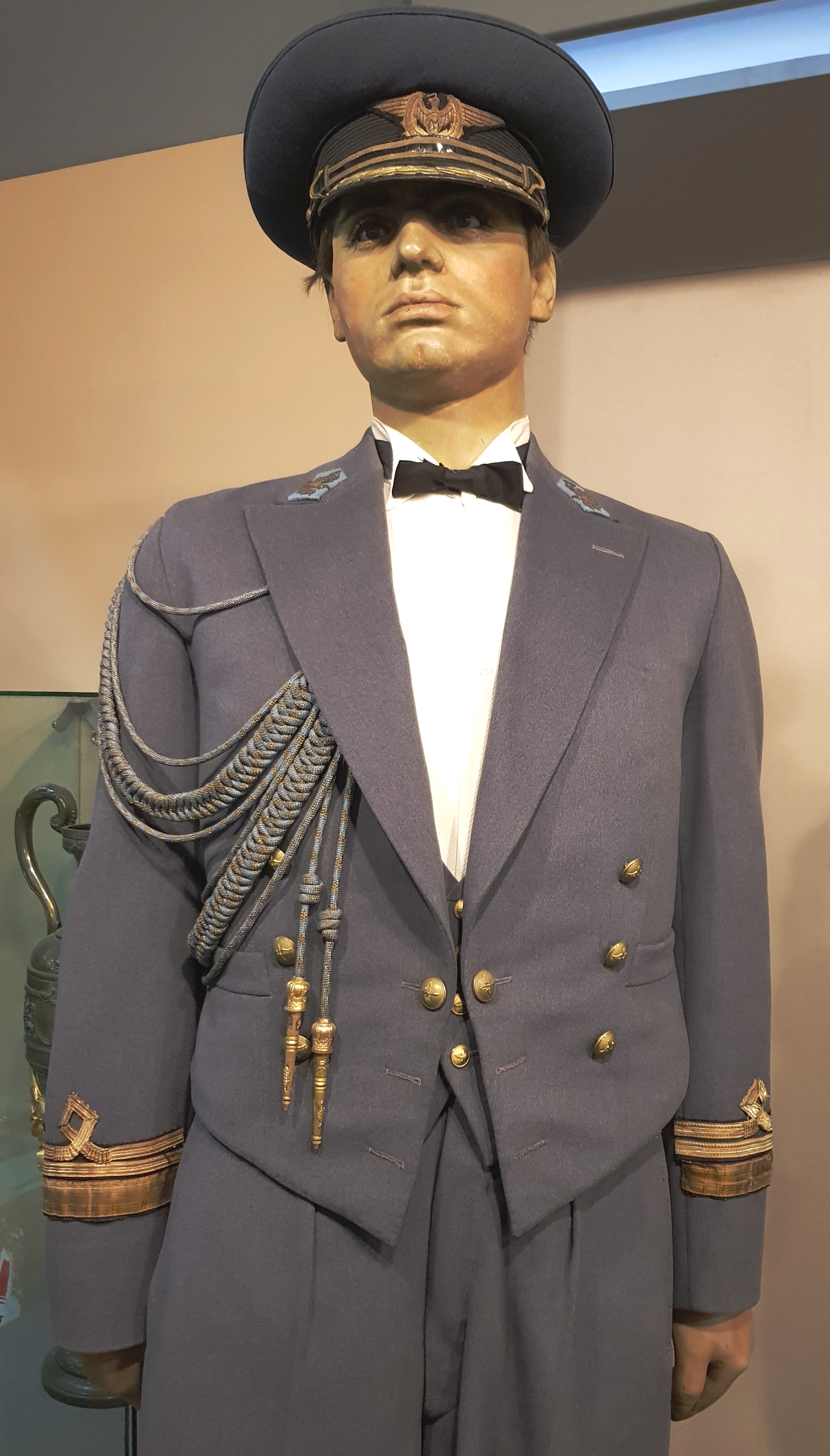
1930s dress uniform of a captain commander (Căpitan-Comandor) from the 2nd Guard Aviation Flotilla

- Horia Agarici
- Constantin Cantacuzino
- Cristea Chirvăsuță
- Traian Dârjan
- Ioan Dicezare
- Ion Dobran
- Tudor Greceanu
- Constantin Lungulescu
- Ioan Maga
- Ioan Mălăcescu
- Ion Milu
- Gheorghe Mociorniță
- Ion Mucenica
- Alexandru Șerbănescu
- Dan Valentin Vizanty

== Structure ==
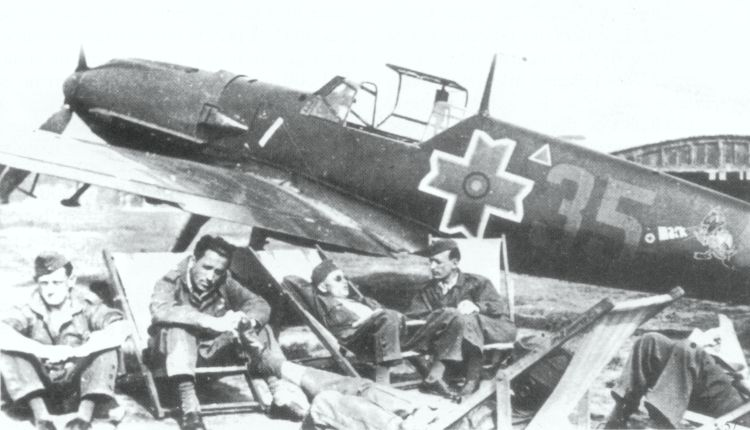
Messerschmitt Bf 109E no. 35 at Stalingrad, 1942

- Corpul 1 Aerian, under orders of Luftwaffe, Luftflotte 4 – South Russia Front, 1943–44; Cioara-Doicești, Romania August 1944.
- Corpul 2 Aerian, 1 April 1944 – 18 August 1944, renamed Corpul 3 Aerian
- Corpul 3 Aerian, 18 August 1944 – 3 December 1944

Fighter units

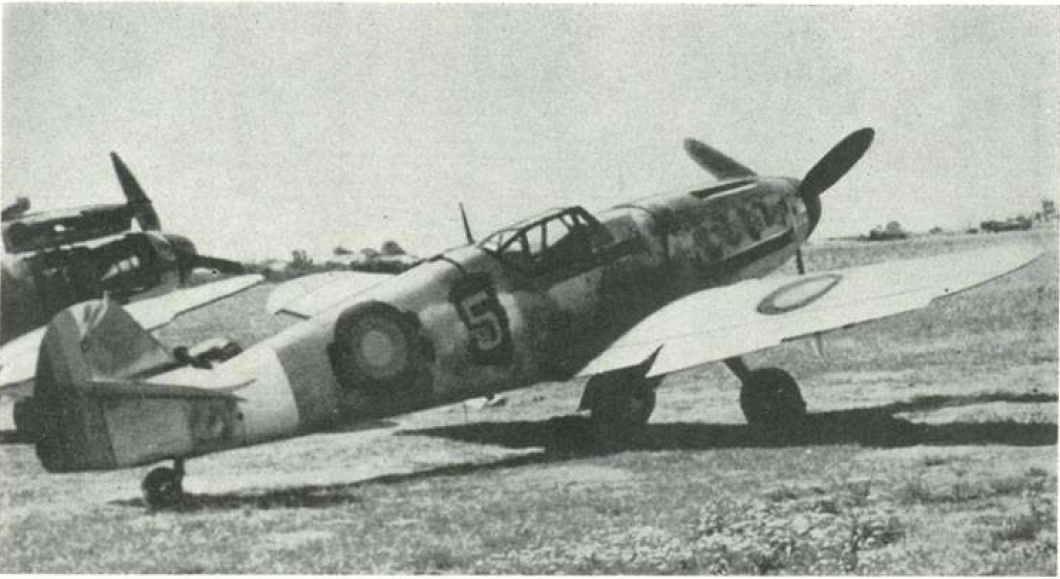
A Romanian Bf 109G-6, 1944

- 1st Fighter Group (Grupul 1 Vânătoare)
  - 43rd Fighter Squadron
  - 63rd Fighter Squadron
  - 64th Fighter Squadron
- 2nd Fighter Group (Grupul 2 Vânătoare)
  - 65th Fighter Squadron
  - 66th Fighter Squadron
  - 67th Fighter Squadron
  - 50th Fighter Squadron
- 3rd Fighter Group (Grupul 3 Vânătoare)
  - 41st Fighter Squadron
  - 44th Fighter Squadron
  - 49th Fighter Squadron
- 4th Fighter Group (Grupul 4 Vânătoare)
  - 45th Fighter Squadron
  - 46th Fighter Squadron
- 5th Fighter Group (Grupul 5 Vânătoare)
  - 51st Fighter Squadron - 10th Fighter Squadron until October 1939
  - 52nd Fighter Squadron - 11th Fighter Squadron until October 1939
  - 53rd Fighter Squadron
- 6th Fighter Group (Grupul 6 Vânătoare)
  - 59th Fighter Squadron
  - 61st Fighter Squadron
  - 62nd Fighter Squadron
- 7th Fighter Group (Grupul 7 Vânătoare)
  - 56th Fighter Squadron
  - 57th Fighter Squadron
  - 58th Fighter Squadron
- 8th Fighter Group (Grupul 8 Vânătoare) - from 1941 – 1943
  - 41st Fighter Squadron
  - 42nd Fighter Squadron
  - 60th Fighter Squadron
- 9th Fighter Group (Grupul 9 Vânătoare)
  - 47th Fighter Squadron
  - 48th Fighter Squadron
  - 56th Fighter Squadron
- 1st Night Fighter Squadron (Escadrila 1 Vânătoare de Noapte)

Bomber units

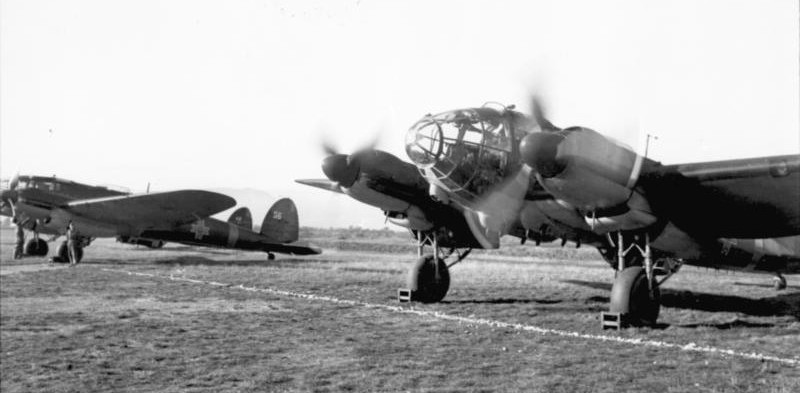
Romanian Heinkel He 111H bombers

- 1st Bomber Group (Grupul 1 Bombardament)
  - 71st Bomber Squadron
  - 72nd Bomber Squadron
- 2nd Bomber Group (Grupul 2 Bombardament)
  - 82nd Bomber Squadron
  - 83rd Bomber Squadron
- 3rd Bomber/Dive Bomber Group (Grupul 3 Bombardament/picaj)
  - 73rd Bomber/Dive Squadron
  - 81st Bomber/Dive Squadron
  - 85th Bomber/Dive Squadron
- 4th Bomber Group (Grupul 4 Bombardament)
  - 76th Bomber Squadron
  - 78th Bomber Squadron
- 5th Bomber Group (Grupul 5 Bombardament)
  - 77th Bomber Squadron
  - 79th Bomber Squadron
  - 80th Bomber Squadron
- 6th Bomber / Dive Bomber Group (Grupul 6 Bombardament/picaj)
  - 74th Bomber/Dive Squadron
  - 86st Bomber/Dive Squadron
  - 87th Bomber/Dive Squadron
- 7th Light Bomber Group (Grupul 7 Bombardament Ușor)
  - 17th Light Bomber Squadron
  - 18th Light Bomber Squadron
- 8th Assault Group (Grupul 8 Asalt) - formed from the 8th Fighter Group
  - 41st Assault Squadron - ex-41st Fighter Squadron
  - 42nd Assault Squadron - ex-42nd Fighter Squadron
  - 60th Assault Squadron - ex-60th Fighter Squadron

Reconnaissance Units

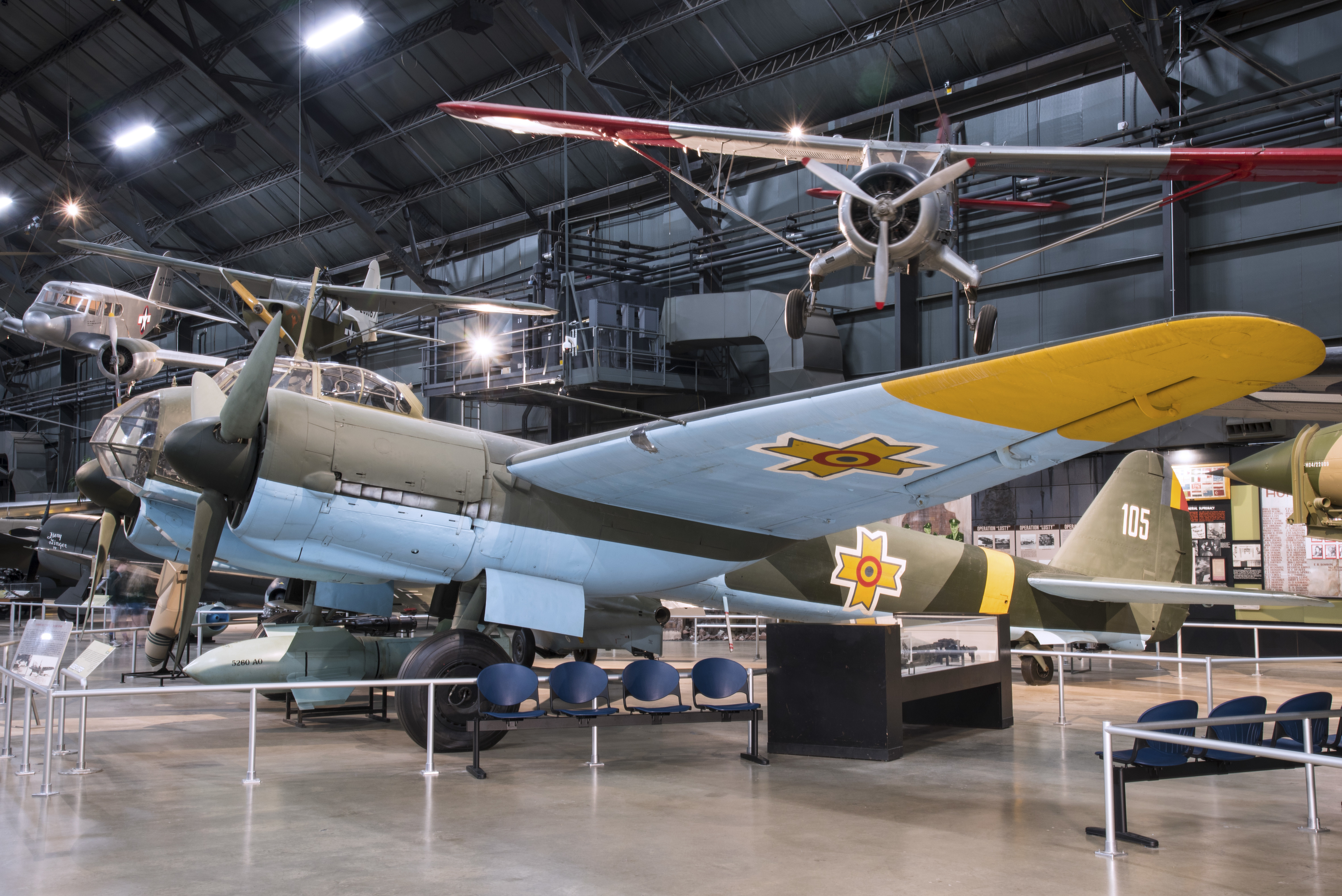
A preserved Junkers Ju 88D-1 in the National Museum of the United States Air Force, painted with the Romanian markings it carried during the war

- 1st Long Range Recon Group (Grupul 1 Recunoaștere Îndepărtată)
  - 1st Long Range Recon Squadron
  - 2nd Long Range Recon Squadron
  - 3rd Long Range Recon Squadron
  - 4th Long Range Recon Squadron
- 1st Guard Group (Grupul 1 Gardă)
  - 11th Observation Squadron
  - 12th Observation Squadron
- 2nd Guard Group (Grupul 2 Gardă)
  - 13th Observation Squadron
  - 14th Observation Squadron
- 19th, 20th, 21st, and 22nd Observation squadrons

Transport Units

- Air Transport Group (Grupul de Aero-Transport)
  - 105th Transport Squadron
  - 106th Transport Squadron
  - 107th Transport Squadron
  - 108th Light Transport Squadron - known as Escadrila Albă ("White Squadron")
  - 109th Glider Transport Squadron

Liaison Units

- 111th, 112th, 113th, 115th, 116th Liaison Squadrons (Escadrile de Legătură)

== Aircraft companies ==
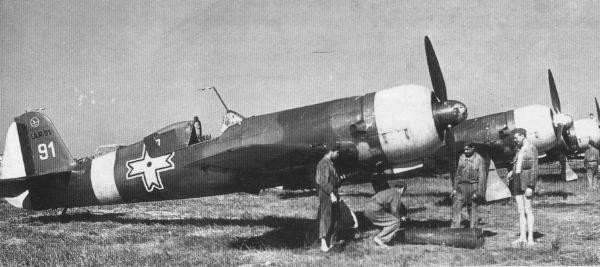
IAR 81 no. 91 in 1943.

- Arsenalul Aeronautic, 1919-1939, Bucharest
- Astra Aircraft Factory, 1923-1925, Arad
- Societatea Pentru Exploatări Tehnice (SET), 1923-1946, Bucharest
- Industria Aeronautică Română (IAR), 1925-1947 (re-established in 1968), Brașov
- Întreprinderea de Construcții Aeronautice Românești (ICAR), 1932-1951, Bucharest

Aircraft constructed under foreign license or assembled

- Messerschmitt Bf 109G (62 109Ga-6 converted from Ga-4 kits, 49 109Ga-2 and 13 109Ga-4 assembled by IAR between 1943 and 1948)
- SM.79B (48 JRS-79B and 38 JRS-79B1 built by IAR)
- Fieseler Fi 156 Storch (80 ordered from ICAR)
- Fleet 10G (40 by built by IAR, 80 by SET and 285 by ICAR)
- PZL P.11f (95 aircraft built by IAR)
- PZL P.24E (25 aircraft built by IAR)
- Potez 25 (217 built under license by IAR)
- Savoia-Marchetti SM.62 (5 built by IAR and ICAR)

== Enemy aircraft interned or captured ==
As a result of the German-Soviet Invasion of Poland, a large number of Polish Air Force aircraft were interned in Romania. Also, some Soviet aircraft were captured during World War II, as well as a few American B-24 Liberator bombers.

== Aircraft of RRAF ==
=== Aircraft manufactured in Romania from 1924 until the end of World War II ===
All of the aircraft listed below were completed before the end of World War II. Prototypes are omitted from the list. Unless specified otherwise, all aircraft machine guns have the caliber of 7.92 mm:

| Model | Type | Number | Armament |
|---|---|---|---|
| Proto 2 | Training | 25 | Unarmed |
| SET 7K | Training, communication, observation | 20 | 2 x 7.7 mm Lewis guns (twin mount) |
| SET 7KB | Reconnaissance and observation | 20 | 2 x 7.7 mm Lewis guns (twin mount); 1 x 7.7 mm Vickers machine gun 6 x 12 kg bombs |
| SET 7KD | Communication | 20 | 1 x 7.7 mm Lewis gun |
| Potez 25 | Reconnaissance bomber | 217 | 3 x 7.7 mm machine guns 200 kg of bombs |
| IAR 37 | Light bomber | 50 | 4 x Browning machine guns 12 x 50 kg bombs |
| IAR 38 | Reconnaissance and artillery spotting | 75 | 3 x Browning machine guns 24 x 12 kg bombs |
| IAR 39 | Reconnaissance and light bomber | 255 | 3 x Browning machine guns 24 x 12 kg bombs |
| Fieseler Fi 156 | Reconnaissance and communications | 46 (Note: Amount delivered by 1946.) | 1 x MG 15 machine gun |
| Fleet 10G | Training and communications | 415 | Unarmed |
| PZL P.11f | Fighter | 95 | 4 x FN Browning machine guns 24 x 12 kg bombs (38); Grenade launchers (57) |
| PZL P.24E | Fighter | 25 | 2 x machine guns 2 x 20 mm cannons 2 x 50 kg (110 lb) bombs Grenade launchers |
| Bf 109Ga-2 | Fighter | 49 | 1 x 20 mm/3 x 20 mm MG 151 cannons 2 x MG 17 machine guns 1 x 500 kg/4 x 50 kg bomb(s) |
| Bf 109Ga-4 | Fighter | 13 | 1 x 20 mm MG 151 cannon 2 x MG 17 machine guns 1 x 250 kg/4 x 50 kg bomb(s) |
| Bf 109Ga-6 | Fighter | 62 (Note: Number of aircraft finished before the end of the war not known.) | 1 x 20 mm MG 151 cannon 2 x 13 mm MG 131 heavy machine guns 1 x 250 kg bomb |
| IAR 80 | Fighter | 50 | 4 x FN Browning machine guns |
| IAR 80A | Fighter | 90 | 6 x FN Browning machine guns |
| IAR 80B | Fighter | 50 | 2 x 13.2 mm FN Browning heavy machine guns 4 x FN Browning machine guns |
| IAR 80C | Fighter | 60 | 2 x 20 mm Ikaria autocannons 4 x FN Browning machine guns |
| IAR 81 | Fighter and dive bomber | 50 | 6 x FN Browning machine guns (4 for 10 of them); 2 x 13.2 mm FN Browning heavy machine gun (10 of them); 1 x 225 bomb 2 x 50 kg bombs |
| IAR 81C | Fighter | 150 | 2 x 20 mm MG 151 autocannons 2 x FN Browning machine guns 2 x Werfer-Granate 21 (tested on one aircraft in 1944) |
| JRS-79B | Bomber | 36 | 5 x machine guns 1,575 kg of bombs |
| JRS-79B1 | Bomber | 31 | 1 x 20 mm Ikaria autocannon 7 x machine guns 1,400 kg of bombs |
| Savoia-Marchetti SM.62 | Flying boat | 5 | 4 x machine guns 600 kg of bombs |

== Aircraft Markings ==
The roundel of the ARR was based on the national cockade of Romania. During World War Two, from 1941 to 1944, the national cockade was reduced in size and placed in the center of a four-M cross, the seal of King Michael I of Romania. These crosses came in different types and sizes as there was no standard model. The markings were placed on the fuselage as well as on the upper and lower wings, and the national colours were painted on the tail. According to Axis regulations, the engine cowling, the under-surfaces of the wingtips and a vertical band on the fuselage ahead of the tail were painted in yellow. After Romania joined the Allies, the crosses were changed back to the tricolor roundels on the fuselage and wings, and the yellow markings were painted white as "Allied identification markings".

Roundel used for aircraft and vehicles from 1924 to 1941, 1944 to 1949.

Marking used by the Air Force, and the Army from 1 May 1941 to 3 September 1944.

Cross used only on the IAR-80/81.

== Ranks and insignia ==
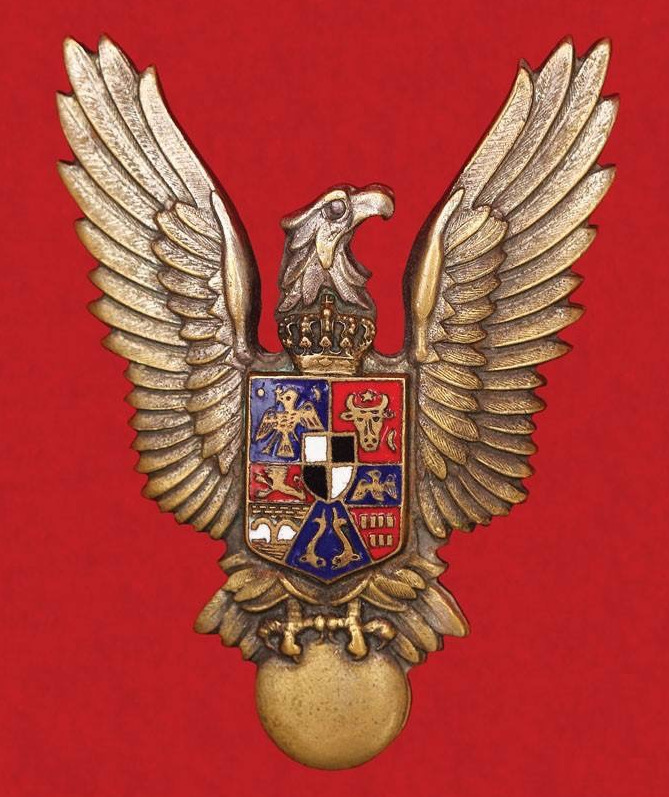
Model 1941 pilot badge

Officers

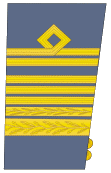
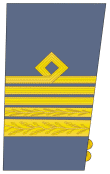
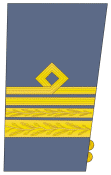
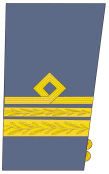
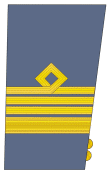
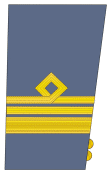
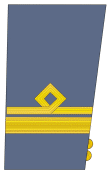
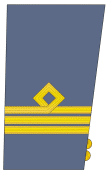
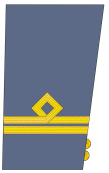
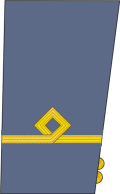
| Rank group | General / flag officers | | | | Senior officers | | | Junior officers |
|---|---|---|---|---|---|---|---|---|---|---|
| Royal Romanian Air Force |
| Royal Romanian Air Force | Mareșal (Note: Only awarded to King Michael I.) | General inspector | General comandant | General de escadră aeriană | Comandor | Căpitan-comandor | Locotenent-comandor | Căpitan | Locotenent | Sublocotenent |
| Rank group | General / flag officers | | | | Senior officers | | | Junior officers |

Enlisted/Non-commissioned officers

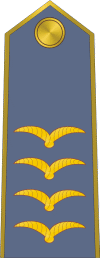
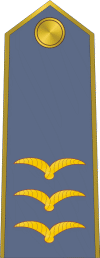
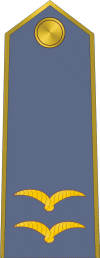
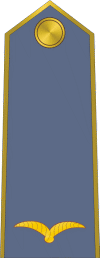
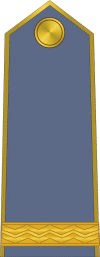
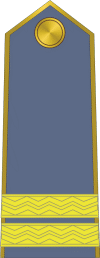
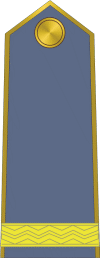
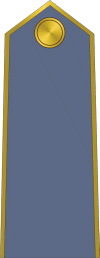
| Rank group | Senior NCOs | | | | Junior NCOs | | Enlisted |
|---|---|---|---|---|---|---|---|---|
| Royal Romanian Air Force |
| Royal Romanian Air Force | Adjutant șef | Adjutant major | Adjutant | Adjutant stagiar | Sergent | Caporal | Fruntaș | Soldat |
| Rank group | Senior NCOs | | | | Junior NCOs | | Enlisted |

== Bibliography ==
- Axworthy, Mark (September–October 1999). "Flank Guard: Romania's Advance on Stalingrad, Part Two". Air Enthusiast (65): 72–75. ISSN 0143-5450.
- Antoniu, Dan (2014). Illustrated History of Romanian Aeronautics. ISBN 978-973-0-17209-6.
- Bernád, Dénes (July 1999). "Courrier des Lecteurs" [Readers' Letters]. Avions: Toute l'aéronautique et son histoire (in French) (76): 15–16. ISSN 1243-8650.
- Bernád, Dénes (May 1999). "Histoire des forces aeriennes royales roumaines pendant la Seconde Guerre Mondiale" [History of the Royal Romanian Air Force During the Second World War]. Avions: Toute l'Aéronautique et Son Histoire (in French) (74): 7–13. ISSN 1243-8650.
- Bernád, Dénes (June 1999). "Histoire des forces aeriennes royales roumaines pendant la Seconde Guerre Mondiale". Avions: Toute l'Aéronautique et Son Histoire (in French) (75): 7–14. ISSN 1243-8650.
- Bernád, Dénes (20 June 2003). Rumanian Aces of World War 2. Osprey Publishing. ISBN 978-1-84176-535-8.
- Moroșanu, Teodor Liviu; Melinte, Dan (2010). Romanian Fighter Colours 1941-1945. MMPBooks. ISBN 978-83-89450-90-6.
- Passingham, Malcolm & Noël, Jean (September 1989). "Les avions militaires roumains de 1910 à 1945" [Romanian Military Aircraft from 1910 to 1945]. Le Fana de l'Aviation (in French) (238): 34–40. ISSN 0757-4169.
- Passingham, Malcolm & Noël, Jean (October 1989). "Les avions militaires roumains de 1910 à 1945 (2)" [Romanian Military Aircraft from 1910 to 1945, Part 2]. Le Fana de l'Aviation (in French) (239): 14–21. ISSN 0757-4169.
- Passingham, Malcolm & Noël, Jean (November 1989). "Les avions militaires roumains de 1910 à 1945 (3)" [Romanian Military Aircraft from 1910 to 1945, Part 3]. Le Fana de l'Aviation (in French) (240): 14–22. ISSN 0757-4169.
- Passingham, Malcolm & Noël, Jean (December 1989). "Les avions militaires roumains de 1910 à 1945 (4)" [Romanian Military Aircraft from 1910 to 1945, Part 4]. Le Fana de l'Aviation (in French) (241): 33–36. ISSN 0757-4169.
- Passingham, Malcolm & Noël, Jean (January 1990). "Les avions militaires roumains de 1910 à 1945 (5)" [Romanian Military Aircraft from 1910 to 1945, Part 5]. Le Fana de l'Aviation (in French) (242): 40–43. ISSN 0757-4169.
- Passingham, Malcolm & Noël, Jean (February 1990). "Les avions militaires roumains de 1910 à 1945 (6)" [Romanian Military Aircraft from 1910 to 1945, Part 6]. Le Fana de l'Aviation (in French) (243): 38–42. ISSN 0757-4169.
- Passingham, Malcolm & Noël, Jean (March 1990). "Les avions militaires roumains de 1910 à 1945 (7)" [Romanian Military Aircraft from 1910 to 1945, Part 7]. Le Fana de l'Aviation (in French) (244): 37–41. ISSN 0757-4169.
- Passingham, Malcolm; Noël, Jean (April 1990). "Les avions militaires roumains de 1910 à 1945 (8)" [Romanian Military Aircraft from 1910 to 1945, Part 8]. Le Fana de l'Aviation (in French) (245): 42–46. ISSN 0757-4169.
