= IAR K14 =

1937 Romanian radial aircraft engine

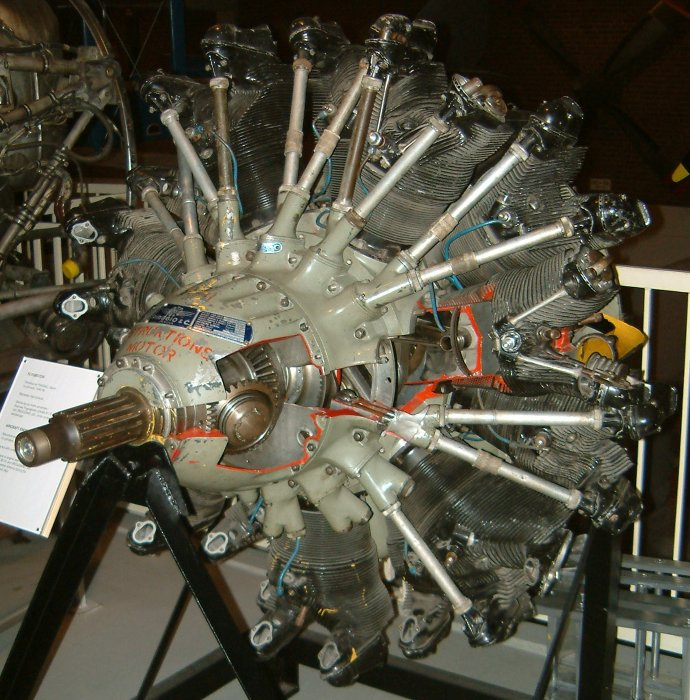
- A Preserved Piaggio P.XI, an Italian-built Gnome-Rhône Mistral Major
- Type: Radial engine
- National origin: Romania
- Manufacturer: Industria Aeronautică Română
- First run: 1937
- Major applications: IAR 80, IAR 37, IAR 39
- Number built: 1000
- Developed from: Gnome-Rhône Mistral Major

The IAR K14 was a Romanian 14-cylinder radial aircraft engine. The IAR K14 was a licensed derivative of the French Gnome-Rhône 14K Mistral Major produced in Romania.

== Variants ==
IAR K14-I 40
IAR K14-I C32
693 kW (930 hp) engine. 44 for IAR P.24E
IAR K14-II C32
649 kW (870 hp) engine. 50 built for IAR 37, 1 built for IAR 80 prototype
IAR K14-II D32
IAR K14-III C36
690 kW (930 hp) engine. 20 built for IAR 80, 95 built for IAR 37
IAR K14-IV C32
716 kW (960 hp) engine. 30 built for IAR 80, 160 built for IAR 39, 2 built for IAR 47 prototypes
IAR K14-IV C32 1000A
764 kW (1025 hp) engine. 430 built for IAR 80, IAR 81

== Applications ==
- Industria Aeronautică Română IAR P.24E
- Industria Aeronautică Română IAR 37
- Industria Aeronautică Română IAR 39
- Industria Aeronautică Română IAR 47
- Industria Aeronautică Română IAR 80
- Industria Aeronautică Română IAR 81
- Savoia-Marchetti SM 79B Romanian type

== Specifications ==
=== General characteristics ===
- Type: Fourteen-cylinder two-row air-cooled radial engine
- Bore: 146 mm (5.748 in)
- Stroke: 165 mm (6.496 in)
- Displacement: 38.673 L (2,360 in³)
- Diameter: 1,296 mm (51.02 in)
- Dry weight: 540 kg (1,190 lb)

=== Components ===
- Valvetrain: Overhead valves
- Supercharger: Single-speed centrifugal type supercharger
- Fuel system: Stromberg carburetor
- Fuel type: 87 octane rating gasoline
- Cooling system: Air-cooled
- Reduction gear: 2:3

=== Performance ===
- Power output:
- 743 kW (996 hp) at 2,390 rpm for takeoff
- 821 kW (1,100 hp) at 2,390 rpm at 2,600 m (8,530 ft)
- Specific power: 21.23 kW/L (0.47 hp/in³)
- Compression ratio: 5.5:1
- Specific fuel consumption: 328 g/(kW•h) (0.54 lb/(hp•h))
- Oil consumption: 20 g/(kW•h) (0.53 oz/(hp•h))
- Power-to-weight ratio: 1.52 kW/kg (0.92 hp/lb)

== See also ==
Related development

- Gnome-Rhône Mistral Major

Comparable engines

- Bristol Hercules
- Piaggio P.XI
- Tumansky M-87
- Tumansky M-88
- Wright R-2600

Related lists

- List of aircraft engines
