= Operation Margarethe II =

Planned invasion of Romania by Germany during WWII

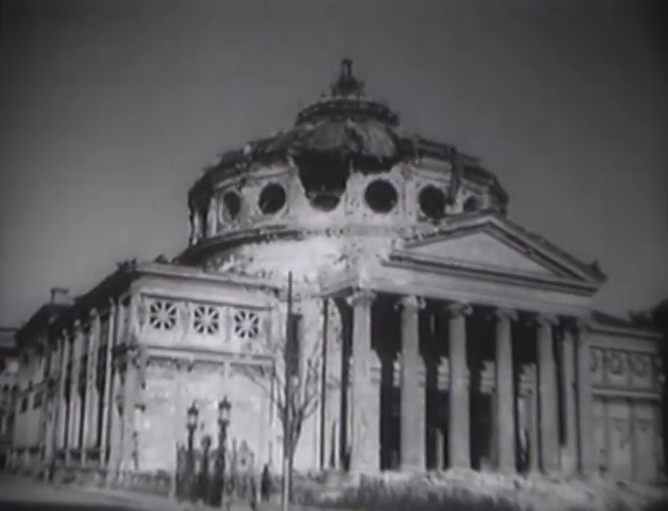
A damaged Romanian Athenaeum as a result of the German air raids

During World War II, Operation Margarethe II was the name for a planned invasion of Romania by German forces in conjunction with those of Hungary and Bulgaria if the Romanian government decided to surrender to the Allies and switch sides. Although initially abandoned within a few weeks at the start of 1944, after King Michael's coup on 23 August 1944 and Antonescu's arrest, Hitler ordered the operation to commence. Led by Luftwaffe General Alfred Gerstenberg, then by General Reiner Stahel, the operation ultimately failed to occupy Bucharest and overthrow Michael and the new government.

== Planning ==
Planning for Margarethe II began in January 1944, some months after planning for Margarethe I, the occupation of Hungary. The draft plan is dated 26 January. It was abandoned within a few weeks, while Margarethe I went ahead in March. The main cause of its abandonment was the visit of Romanian leader Ion Antonescu with German leader Adolf Hitler on 26–28 February. Antonescu refused to relinquish his territorial claims on Hungary, so he was not asked to participate in Margarethe I. Hitler, however, was reassured that Romania had no intention of defecting.

== 1944 coup d'état and the battle of Bucharest ==
On 23 August 1944, a coup d'état led by King Michael overthrew Antonescu. The coup took the Germans by surprise. Hearing the news, Hitler issued the order to execute Operation Margarethe II without delay. Although there was no time to fully implement the plan, Hitler's order called to immediately arrest Michael and his "cabal of traitors", suppress the eventual uprising, and form a new government presided over by a pro-German general if Antonescu was not available.

On the night of 23/24 August, Prime Minister Constantin Sănătescu offered the Germans safe passage through Bucharest and to the Hungarian border in a meeting with General Erik Hansen, General Alfred Gerstenberg and Ambassador Manfred von Killinger. Departing towards Ploiești under the supervision of a Romanian colonel, General Gerstenberg had the Romanian officer arrested after reaching Băneasa. Leading the German territorial corps of about 4,000 soldiers, Gerstenberg took control over the airports of Băneasa and Otopeni. From the two airports, Luftwaffe aircraft began bombing the capital while German troops began fighting the Romanian Army in the city.

In the early morning of 24 August, Bucharest was overflown by ten Bf 110 fighters. As a response, the Military Command of the Capital ordered the Romanian anti-aircraft units to open fire on any German aircraft in the air. Starting from around 11 AM, Bucharest was attacked by Bf 110, He 111, and Ju 87 bombers covered by Bf 109 fighters. The first raid caused heavy damage to buildings and houses, killing 89 civilians and wounding another 90. The raids continued into the night at 30–40 minute intervals.

On the ground, hostilities also began in the early morning of 24 August. Defending the city were around 7,000 soldiers of the Mounted Guard Regiment and a mixed tank battalion of the 2nd Armoured Regiment, while the 4th Paratrooper Battalion was deployed on the airfields around Bucharest. Other units, totaling 40,000 soldiers, were called to Bucharest as reinforcements. Gerstenberg's troops attempted to enter the city from Băneasa but were halted at the Băneasa bridge. Other attempts to enter the city through alternative routes also failed.

On 25 August, Romania officially declared war on the Axis. This allowed the Romanian fighter units to scramble and engage the Germans. The fighter pilots of Grupul 7 Vânătoare and Grupul 9 Vânătoare began downing the first German airplanes and destroying others on the ground. German resistance in the capital had also been reduced, and a front was established against Gerstenberg's forces.

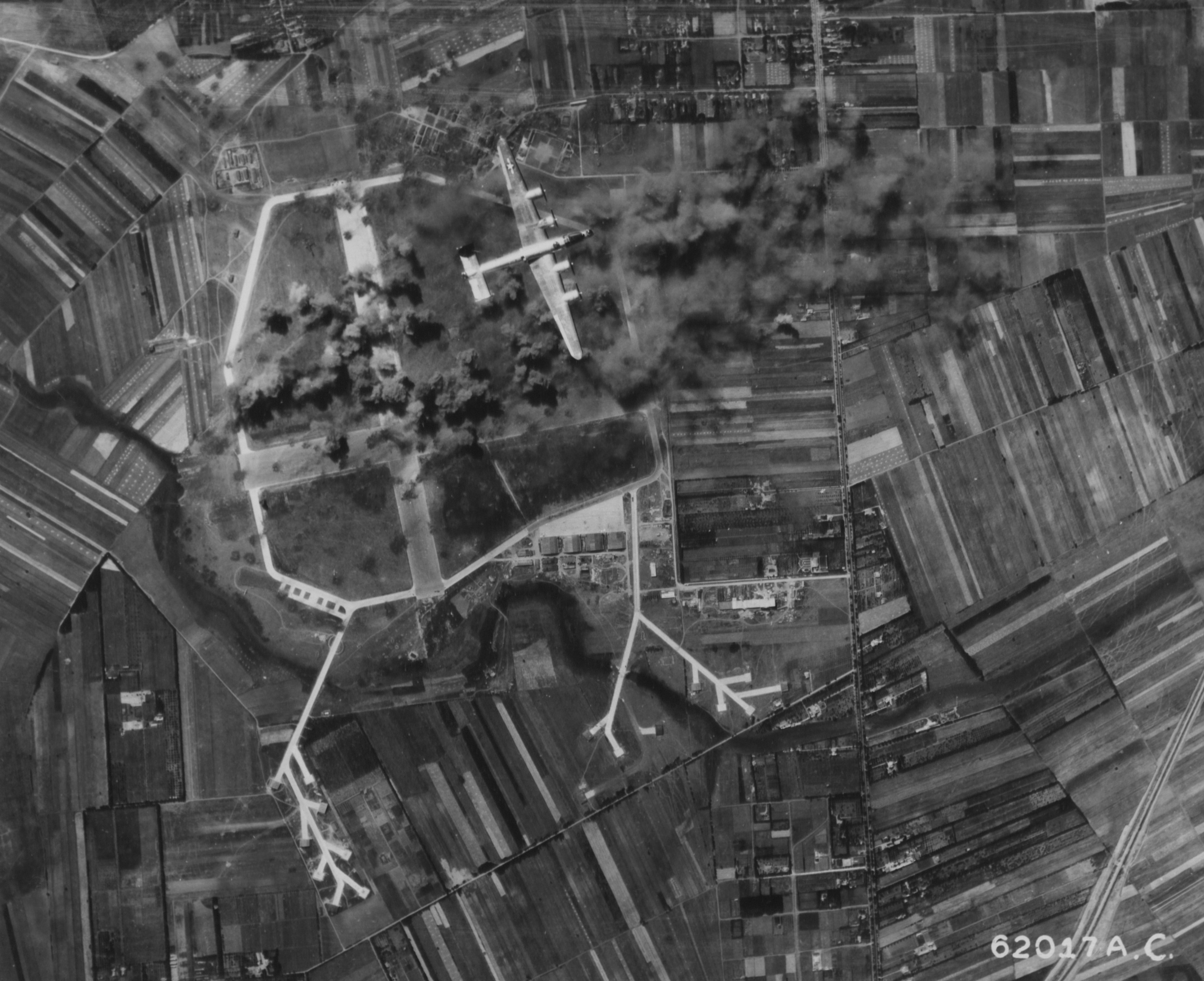
Bombing of the Otopeni airport by US Liberators on 26 August

Due to the war declaration and Gertsenberg's failure to overthrow the new government, General Reiner Stahel, who specialized in suppressing the Warsaw Uprising, was sent as a replacement. The new general did not change any plans and bombing of the city continued. A battalion of Brandenburgers was also sent to Otopeni as reinforcements after failing to secure the Boteni and Țăndărei airfields. However, the Ju 52s and Me 323s transporting the special forces were engaged by Romanian fighters and anti-aircraft artillery.

The same day, a message authorized by the King and government requesting an urgent USAAF air raid over the airports was sent to the command in Cairo by Valeriu Georgescu, a former collaborator with the Special Operations Executive. The next day, on 26 August, a bomber force of several hundred B-24 Liberators destroyed the German positions in and around Băneasa and Otopeni. The Germans were further defeated on the ground near the Pipera Airport, and Romanian troops eventually occupied the airports, ending the German attempts to take the capital.

== Aftermath ==
Between 24 and 26 August, over 100 civilians were killed and over 200 were injured. City infrastructure and many buildings, both military and civilian, were destroyed or damaged including the Royal Palace, the Filantropia hospital, the Romanian Athenaeum, and the Romanian Academy. In the defense of the capital, the Romanian fighter pilots claimed 22 German aircraft destroyed in aerial battles and another five on the ground. The anti-aircraft artillery claimed a further 23 airplanes shot down and 6 damaged. Romanian Air Force losses amounted to four aircraft shot down (including one friendly fire incident), and another 30 destroyed on the ground.

The ending of the bombardments also allowed for the repatriation of Allied prisoners of war during Operation Reunion. The Red Army reached Bucharest on 28 August and entered the city on 31 August without encountering resistance.

The surviving German units began retreating to Ploiești but were caught by retreating elements of the Romanian VI Corps at Gherghița on 28 August. Gerstenberg and Stahel were captured and later taken by the Soviets. About 7,000 German soldiers as well as 14 generals (Note: Including Gerstenberg and Stahel.) were taken prisoner around Bucharest, while the Romanians suffered 1,400 casualties.

== See also ==
- Operation Achse
- Operation Margarethe I
- Operation Panzerfaust
