= Western Allied campaign in Romania =

1941–44 events of WWII

- Part of the oil campaign and Eastern Front of World War II
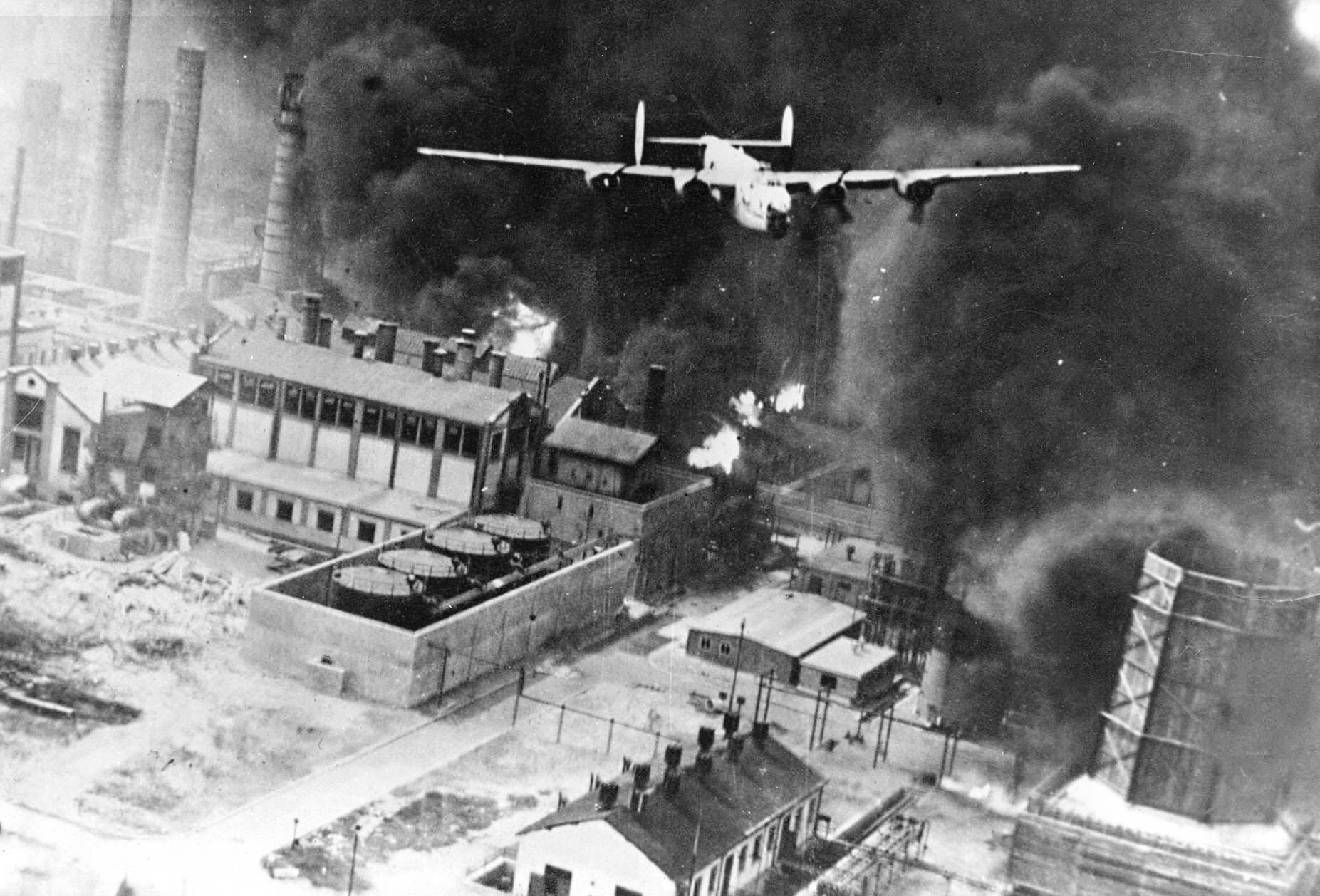
- A B-24 Liberator called "Sandman" during a bomb run over the Ploiești Astra Romana refinery during Operation Tidal Wave
Date	December 1941 (war declarations)/ 12 June 1942 – 19 August 1944
Location	Romania
Result	See Aftermath

Belligerents
United States; British Empire	Romania; Germany

Commanders and leaders
(United States) Franklin D. Roosevelt (United States) Henry H. Arnold (United States) Carl Spaatz (United States) Ira C. Eaker (British Empire) Winston Churchill (British Empire) Arthur Tedder (British Empire) John Slessor	(Kingdom of Romania) Ion Antonescu (Kingdom of Romania) Gheorghe Jienescu (Nazi Germany) Alfred Gerstenberg

Casualties and losses
325 aircraft destroyed (259 by Romanian forces); 32 tanks leased to the Red Army captured 1,706 killed 1,500 captured	80+ Romanian aircraft
- 7,693 civilians killed 7,809 civilians wounded

The Western Allied campaign in Romania consisted of war declarations and aerial operations during the Second World War by eight Western Allied countries against Romania which itself was primarily engaged on the Eastern Front in fighting against the Soviet Union.

== War declarations ==
Romania declared war on the British Empire on 6 December 1941 and on the United States on 12 December. The British returned the war declaration that December. The following summer, June 4, 1942 the United States Congress passed joint resolutions declaring war on Romania along with Hungary and Bulgaria., Two American allies, Nicaragua and Haiti, declared war on Romania on 19 and 24 December respectively. Romania promptly returned these declarations. Four British allies also declared war on Romania: Canada (7 December), New Zealand (7 December), Australia (8 December), and South Africa (9 December). However, Romania never returned these declarations (likely because the four countries were seen as British subjects by the Romanian leadership).

== Early plans ==
The first plans focused on disabling the Romanian oil industry were started by the British in 1940. These mainly involved sabotage of the refineries by Special Operations Executive (SOE) agents and Romanian collaborators and blocking the Danube oil exports. An unsuccessful attempt to block the river exports took place in March–April 1940. Another attempt to destroy the oilfields with a company of Royal Engineers also failed as the fall of France led King Carol II to reconsider the sabotage plan. After the failure of these attempts, Winston Churchill demanded a new plan to attack the Ploiești refineries from the air. This plan was created by Air chief marshal Cyril Newall and called for the use of five bomber squadrons and a four-month campaign in which 25–30% of the Ploiești refineries could be destroyed. Further development was called off after the German invasion of Greece in April 1941.

== Aerial operations ==
=== United States Army Air Forces ===
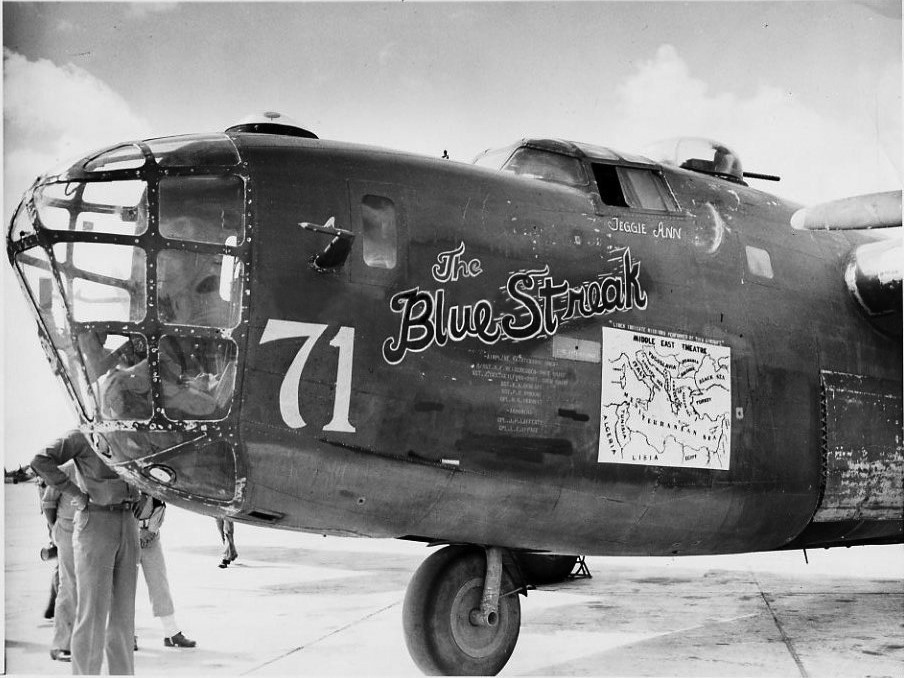
The Blue Streak, one of the B-24s that bombed Romania in 1942

When the Halverson Detachment arrived in Egypt, the plans were given to the Americans for conducting the bombing operations. Having declared war on Romania on 5 June 1942, the first attack on Romanian territory was conducted by the United States Army Air Forces on 12 June. Thirteen B-24 Liberators took off from RAF Fayid on the night of 11 June. Arriving in Romania at dawn, ten B-24s attacked the Romanian oil refineries at Ploiești, two attacked unidentified targets and one attacked the port of Constanța. The damage inflicted was negligible. Although a Romanian IAR 80 pilot and a German Bf 109 pilot both claimed to have shot down a "Halifax" bomber each, none of the 13 aircraft was lost over Romania. Five aircraft were however lost on the return journey to Habbaniyah in Iraq.

In early 1943, at the Casablanca Conference, Churchill once again reiterated the importance of attacking Romania's oil refineries and disrupting the German war effort. Due to a lack of resources, planning was postponed until April 1943, when General Henry H. Arnold commissioned his staff to resume their development.

Code-named Operation Tidal Wave, the attack on 1 August 1943 consisted of a large-scale low-altitude air raid over Romanian oil refineries at Ploiești by 178 unescorted B-24 Liberators. Over 50 of the American bombers were lost during the raid, 35 of which were shot down over Romania. The Royal Romanian Air Force claimed 13 American aircraft while losing only two fighters, and the Luftwaffe claimed 15 bombers in Romania, and another five over the Ionian Sea for the loss of five fighters.

After Tidal Wave, further bombing operations were focused in the Mediterranean theatre and on preparations for Operation Overlord, the Allied invasion of France. After the end of the Pointblank directive, General Carl Spaatz began efforts to target German oil again. With Romania producing about a third of Nazi Germany's high-octane fuel necessary for the German fighters, the Ploiești refineries were targeted again. While earlier objectives were set to destroy 60-70% of Romania's oil production, the plans were delayed in early 1944 due to General Eisenhower and Air chief marshal Tedder insisting on focusing to the "Overlord air plan" and targeting the German rail network in France. Other shortcomings were the lack of escort fighters as the P-47s lacked the range, while the P-38s suffered from performance problems. The lack of escort fighters was fixed with the arrival of the P-51 Mustang. After General Spaatz' plan was authorized to start the campaign in Romania in March, the Fifteenth Air Force began raids on 4 April 1944, initially targeting rail infrastructure while also inadvertently hitting some refineries as well. On the 6 April and 9 May raids, the IAR factory from Brașov was attacked. Following these two raids, production in Brașov was stopped there and the facilities were dispersed to other locations.

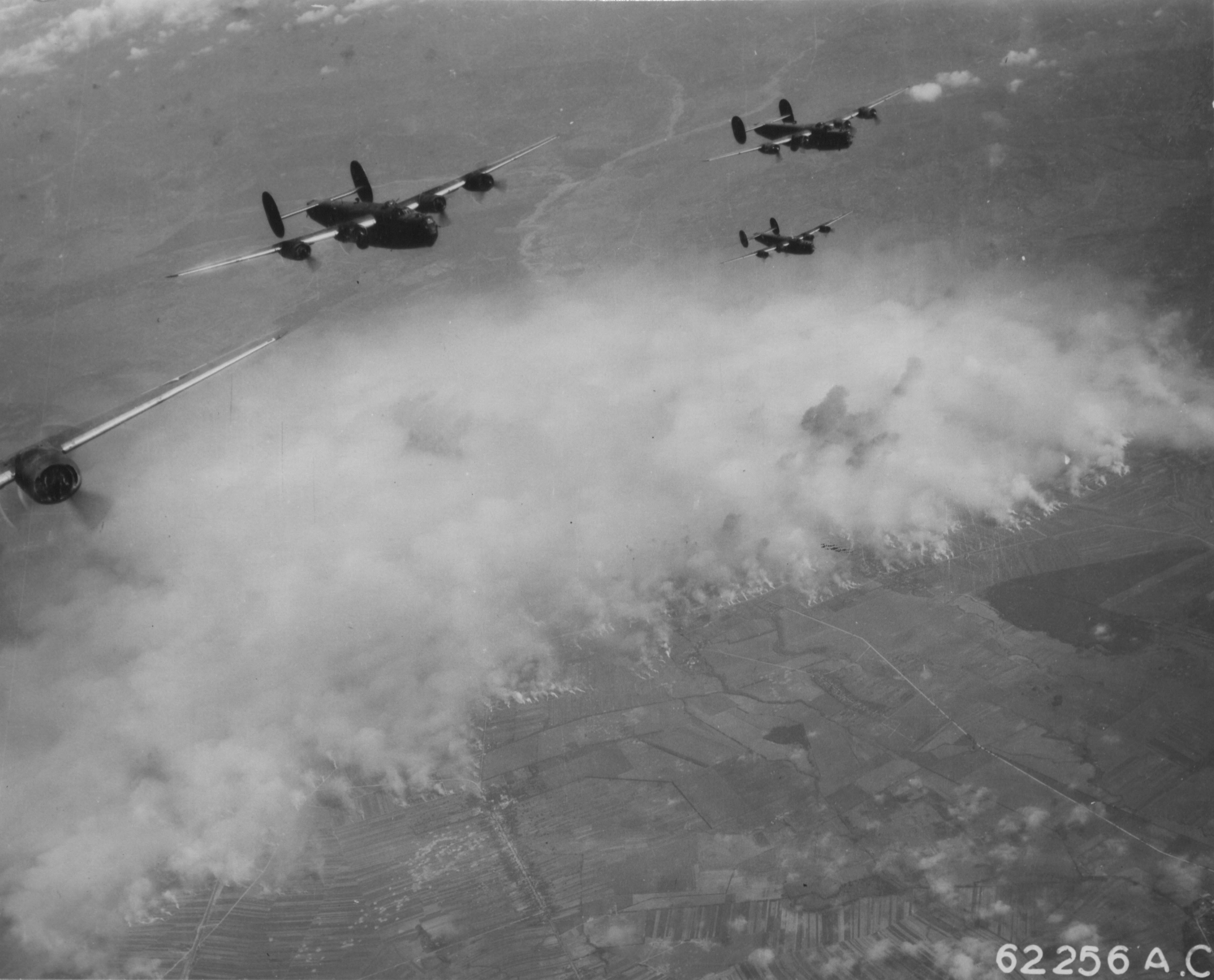
A smoke screen deployed over Ploiești

With the Eighth Air Force beginning its campaign on the German synthetic fuel industry, the Fifteenth also began its oil campaign over Romania. By May 1944, the Combined Chiefs of Staff and Air chief marshal Tedder approved the oil campaign missions and raids restarted over Ploiești. Smoke screens deployed over the city proved to be very effective, and the first missions failed to deal substantial damage to the refineries. Due to these failures, another low-altitude raid was carried out on 10 June 1944 by P-38 Lightning fighters of the 82nd Fighter Group under the escort of the 1st Fighter Group. While the raid was reasonably successful in damaging the Româno-Americană refinery, the tactic was not repeated due to the loss of 22 out of 59 P-38s that reached the target.

At the start of June 1944, shuttle bombing raids as part of Operation Frantic also began. Later that month, the 15th Air Force began diverting some escort fighters to attack Romanian and German airfields. While the strength of the fighter defenses continued to decline, smoke screens and the anti-aircraft defenses around Ploiești remained efficient. By this point, anti-aircraft defenses around Ploiești consisted of over 78 heavy and light batteries, including 10.5 cm FlaK 38 and 12.8 cm FlaK 40 guns, while Bucharest was defended by around 47 heavy and light batteries. The final four raids took place between 17 and 19 August. The campaign was called off on 19 August due to Soviet demands as the Red Army was about to launch a major offensive against Romania.

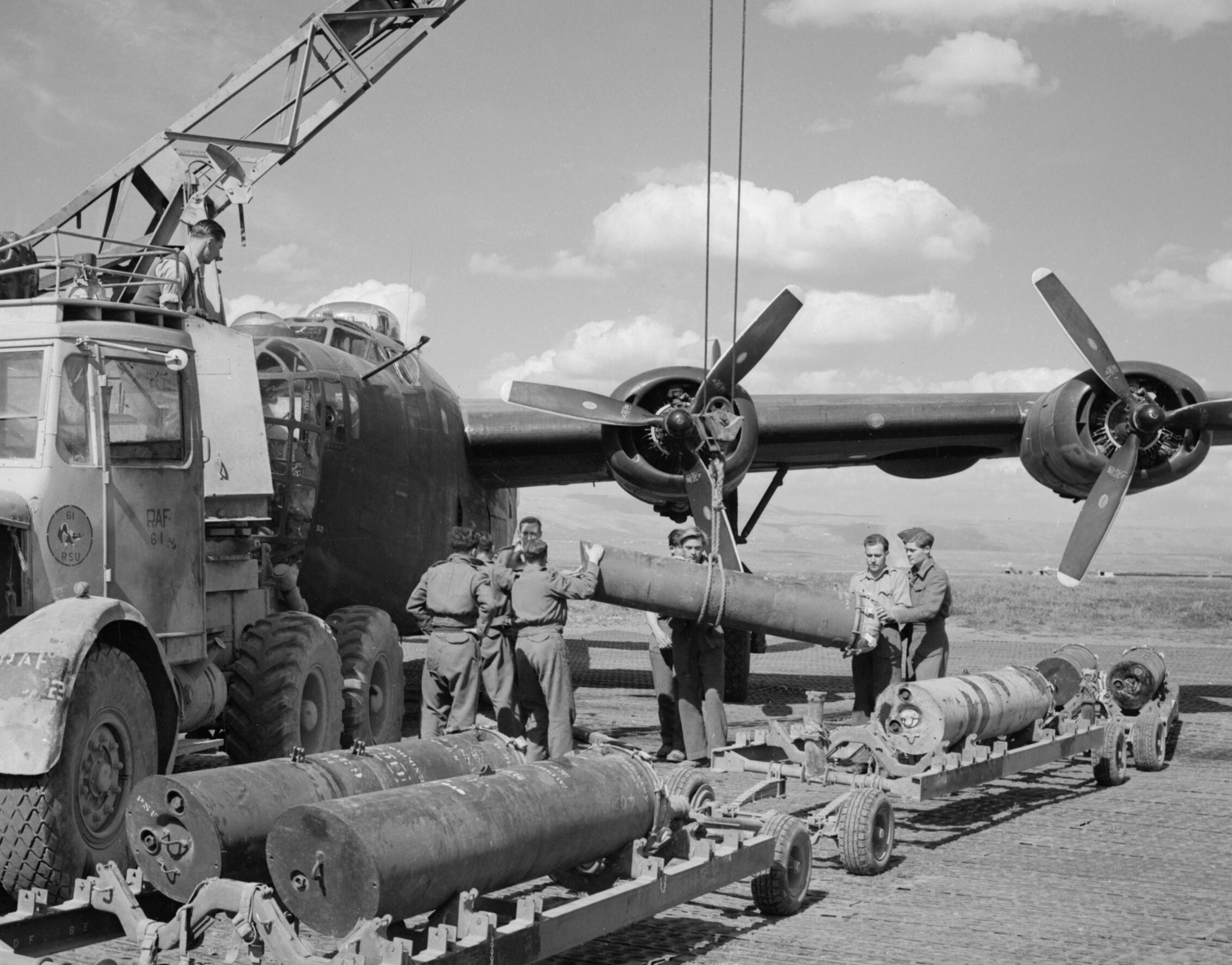
Liberator bomber of 178 Squadron loaded with mines for a sortie on the Danube

=== Royal Air Force ===
Starting in April 1944, seven Royal Air Force squadrons of the No. 205 Group stationed on the Foggia airfields began conducting night-time minelaying operations on the Danube. Two South African squadrons (No. 31 and No. 34) also took part in the missions. Code-named "Gardening" operations, the raids were conducted by Liberator and Wellington bombers and aimed to disrupt the oil transport on the river. The first such raid took place on 8/9 April with 50 Wellingtons, each carrying two 500 kg (1,100 lb) parachute mines. The same month, another night raid was conducted from high altitude against the port of Turnu Severin. From June, Bristol Beaufighters of the No. 255 Squadron also aided the effort against the river shipping by attacking river barges.

The RAF also conducted bombing raids on Bucharest and Ploiești, with the first raid conducted over Bucharest on the night of 15/16 April. On 2/3 July 1944, a bomber force of 31 Wellingtons, 9 Liberators, and 8 Halifaxes was dispatched to attack oil storage tanks in Bucharest. Three bombers were shot down by night fighters. In August, a raid took place against the Româno-Americană refinery with 61 bombers. Accurate flak fire was encountered over the target and 11 aircraft were lost, as well as one pathfinder Halifax of No. 614 Squadron which sustained irreparable damage and had to be scrapped.

== Aftermath ==
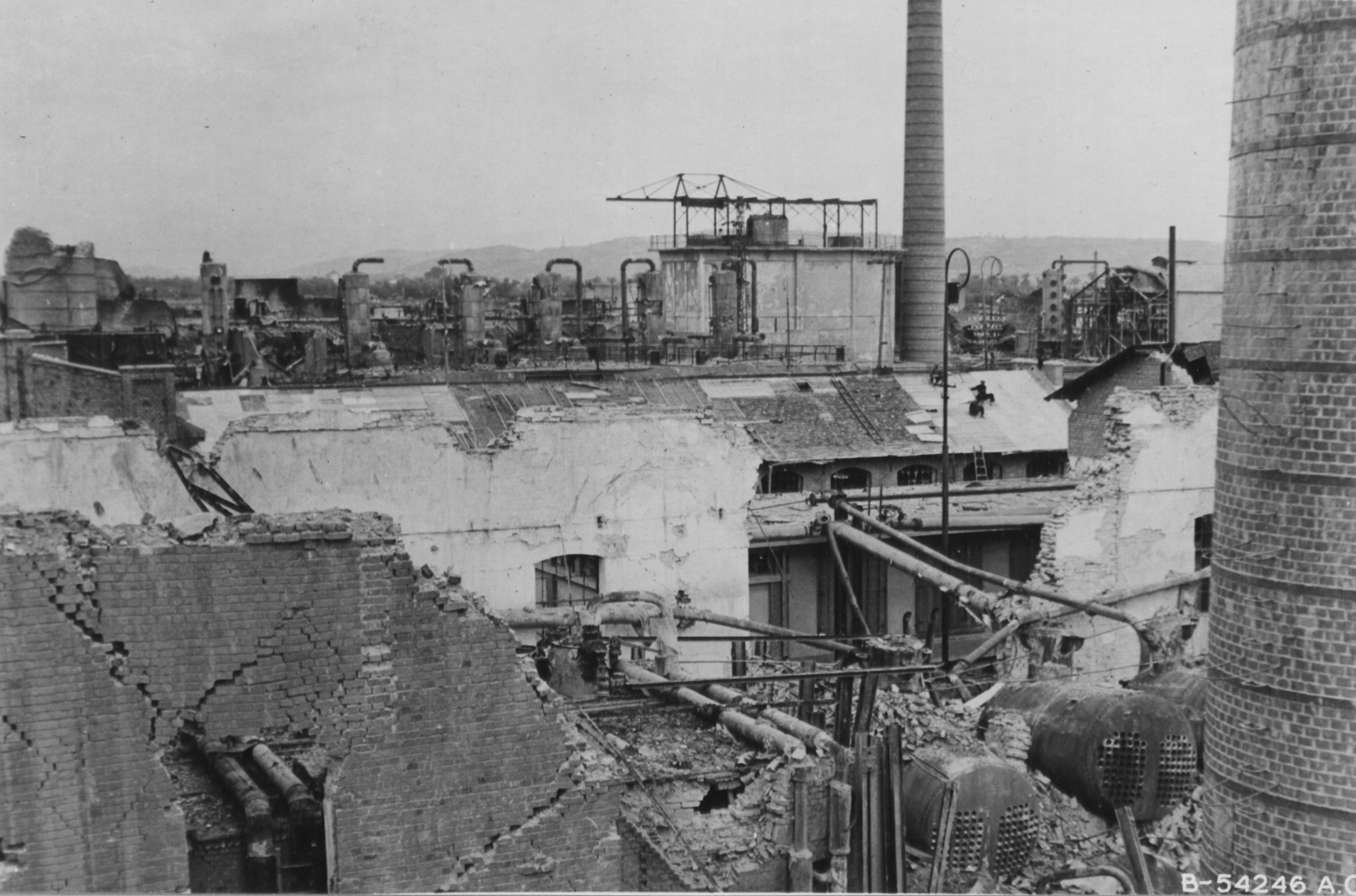
Damage sustained by the Concordia Vega refinery in 1944

In 1944, US bombers flew on more than 42 day-bombing missions, while the RAF carried out at least 23 night air-raids. With oil production being reduced by just 50%-56%, the Western Allies' military campaign ultimately proved to be an unsuccessful endeavor, failing to fulfill the objective of knocking out Romania's oil production. The bombing campaign did however significantly reduce the fuel exports to Germany by damaging the infrastructure, whereby only a fraction of the oil reached Germany. River transports were also heavily affected. By August, less than 30% of the daily 10,000 tons of oil exported by ship to Germany before the bombardments could reach the destination.

In just over a year, from Operation Tidal Wave until the 1944 bombing campaign was called off, the Romanian aircraft, aided by Romanian artillery, shot down 259 Allied aircraft (223 bombers and 36 fighters). Nazi German forces allied to Romania shot down 66 more Allied aircraft. In total, Allied casualties amounted to 1,706 KIA and 1,500 POWs. The total Allied attrition rate suffered over Romania was around seven percent, compared to the 3.5 percent suffered in Western Europe. Romanian aircraft-losses were also heavy, amounting to over 80 fighters shot down. It is not known how many Romanian aircrews were killed, but one victim was Alexandru Șerbănescu, Romania's second-best flying ace (47 kills, shot down on 18 August).

Unlike the raids over Germany, the British and Americans avoided targeting civilian objectives in Romania as it was known that Romanian public opinion opposed continuing the war. Only propaganda leaflets were to be dropped in residential areas, while low-altitude raids on the Danube also forbade using machine guns on settlements along the river. Despite these restrictions, the low accuracy of the bombs caused many civilian casualties, with 7,693 Romanian civilians killed, 2,673 of them on 4 April 1944, when the Americans kickstarted the campaign by bombing Bucharest. Another 7,809 civilians were wounded, and over 47,000 were left homeless.

The Allies achieved their aim of interdicting Romanian oil-supplies to the Axis powers in August 1944 when Romania left the Axis and joined the Allies as Soviet Red Army troops captured the oil resources at Ploiești.

== Western Allied prisoners ==
The prisoners taken after Tidal Wave were interned in Camp No. 14 (Lagărul de prizonieri nr. 14) which was located in Timișul de Jos. In 1944, another prison camp (Camp No. 13) was established in Bucharest. Initially located in the barracks of the 6th Guard Regiment "Mihai Viteazul", it was later moved to the Normal School on St. Ecaterina street.

All Allied airmen who were taken prisoner during the air campaign were repatriated by airlift to Italy during Operation Reunion after the 1944 Romanian coup d'état. 1,161 ex-prisoners of which 1,127 American, 31 British, two Dutch and one French were evacuated by modified B-17 bombers.

== Ground operations ==
Although not directly engaging Romanian ground troops, the Western Allies had supplied military equipment to the Red Army via Lend-Lease. The Romanians had captured some Western tanks that had been leased to the Soviets: four M3 Lees, twenty-one M3 Stuarts, four Valentine Mk IIIs and nineteen unspecified Vickers tanks.

A proposal for an Allied intervention in Romania was also made in October 1943 through the Romanian vice-consul in Istanbul to the SOE by the generals conspiring in the future coup against Antonescu. The generals in charge of the plan, Constantin Nicolescu and Gheorghe Potopeanu, insisted on a token force of one or two thousand British paratroopers be sent to Romania to accept the unconditional surrender of the Romanian Army, thus avoiding a direct capitulation to the Soviets. Although the plans of the coup reached both the British and US Governments, these were considered too incomplete, with low chances of success and nothing was agreed upon.

== Gallery ==
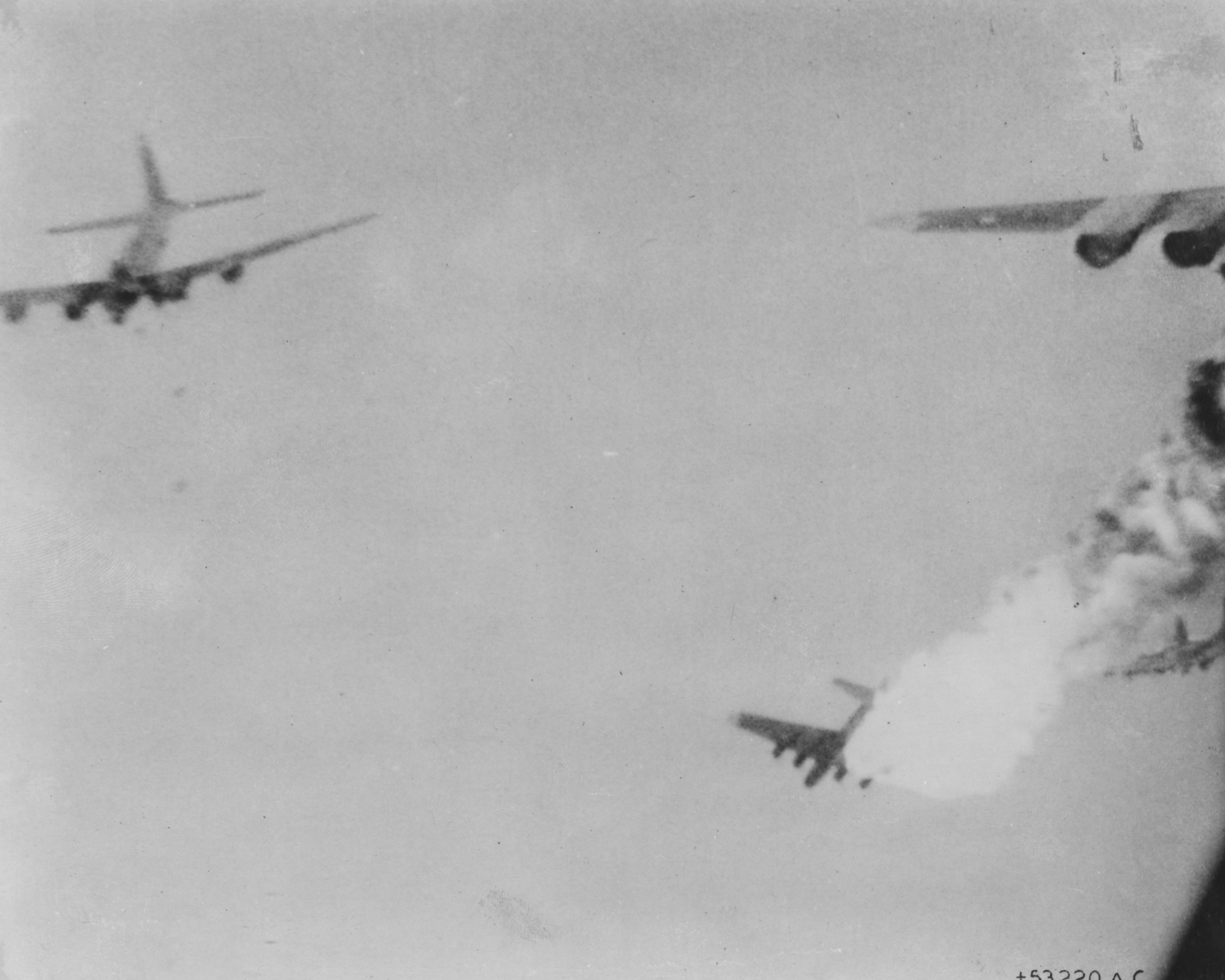
A B-17 bomber bursts into flames after being hit by flak over Ploiești

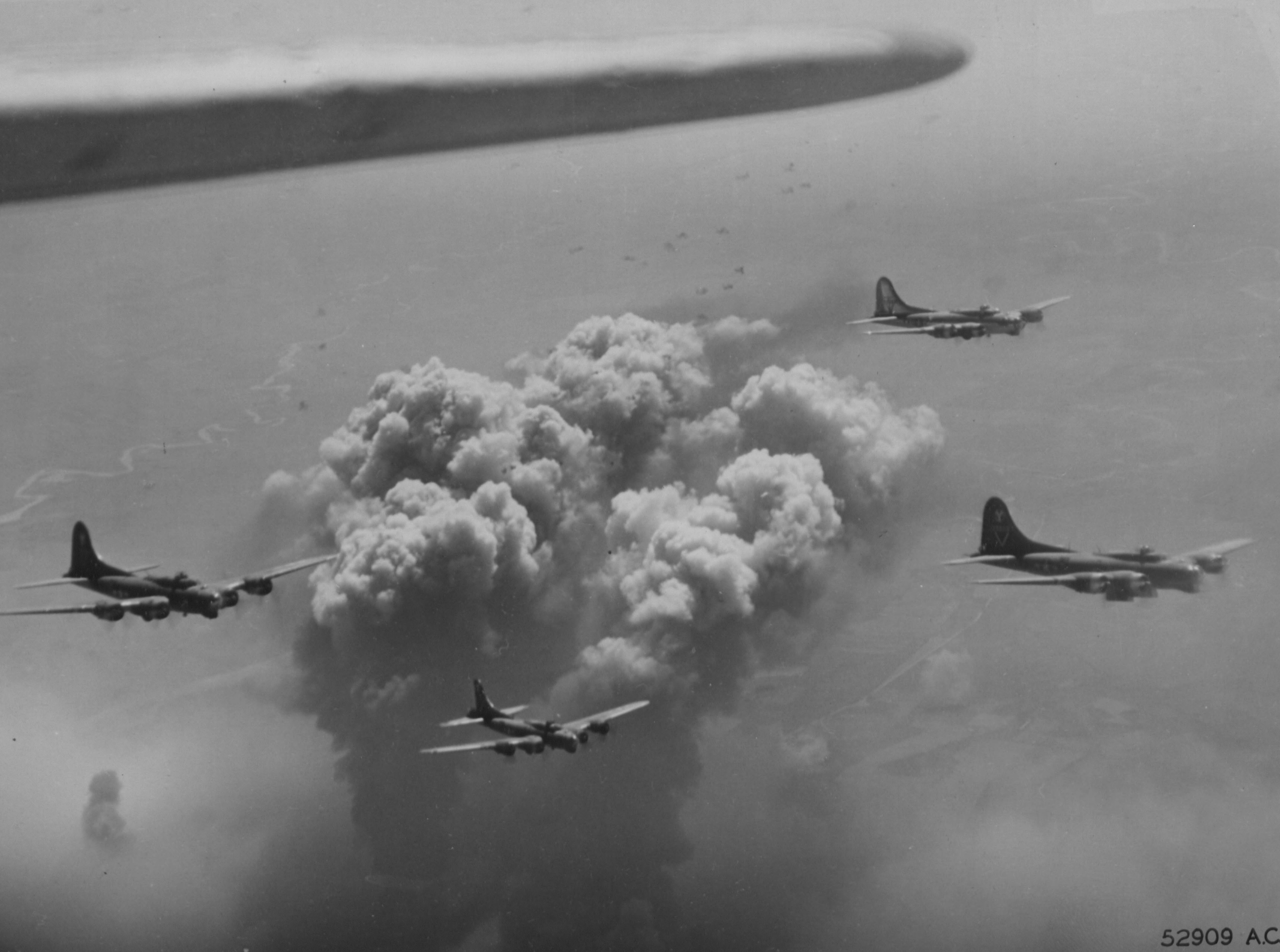
B-17s over Ploiești on 28 July 1944

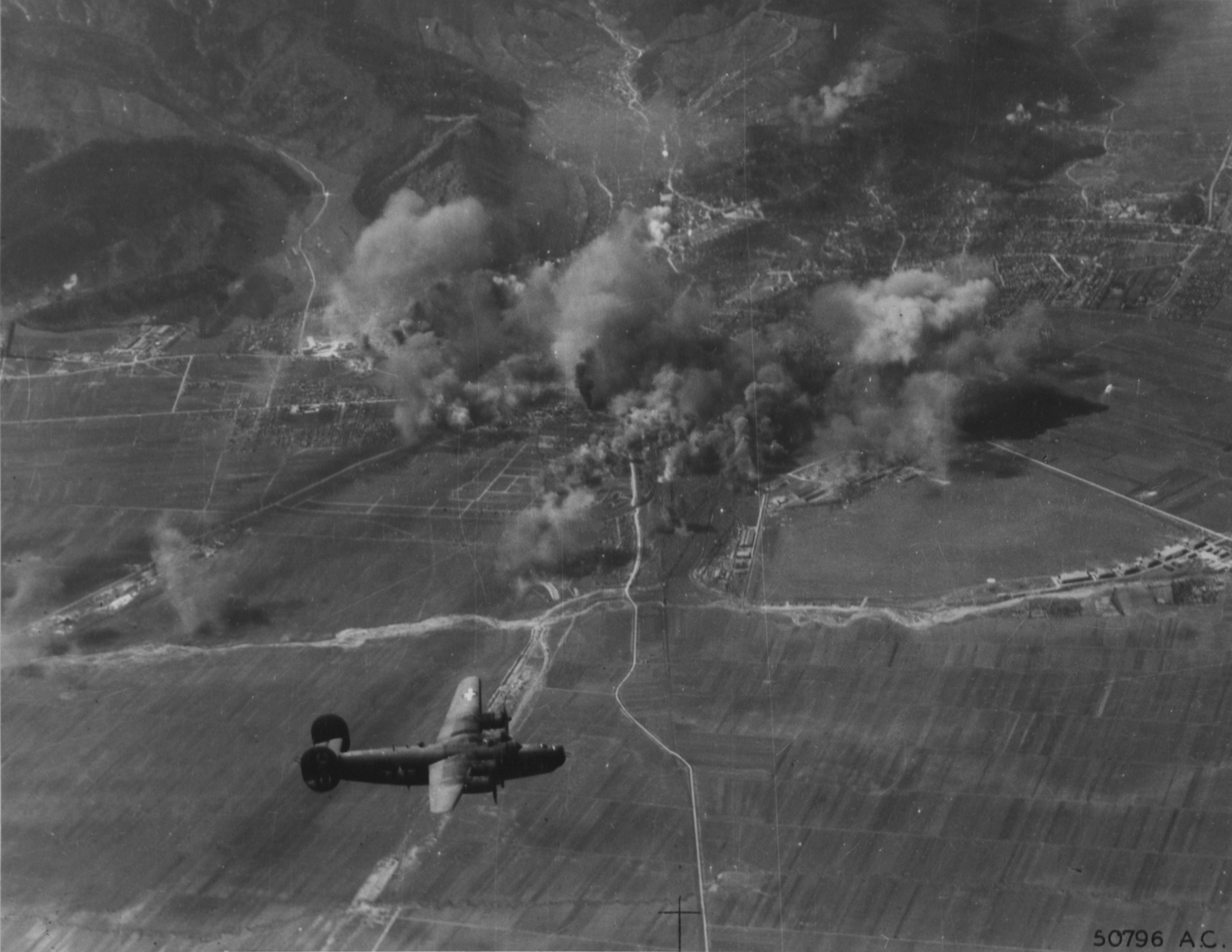
Bombing of Brașov on 16 April 1944

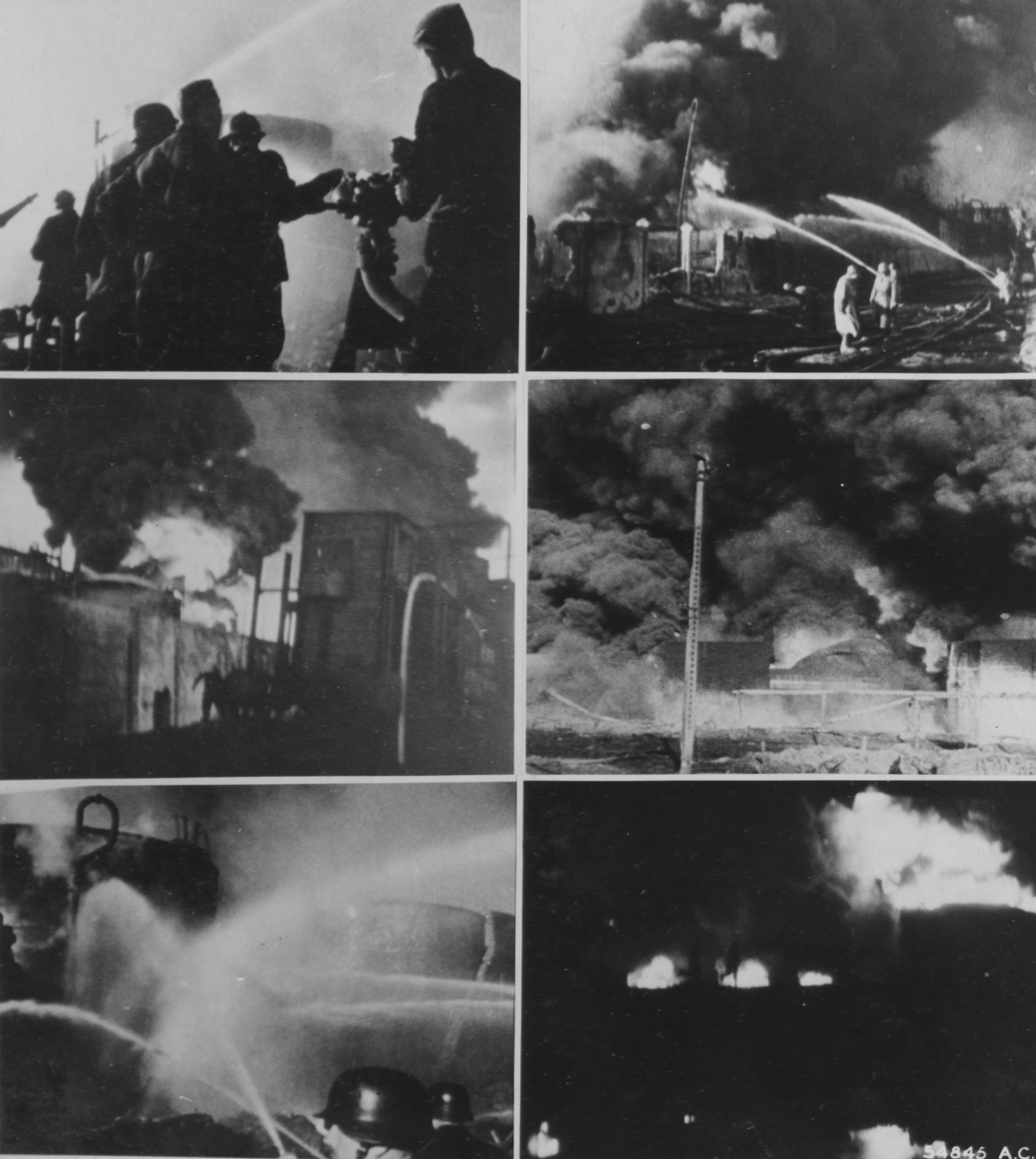
Firefighters extinguishing flames in Ploiești

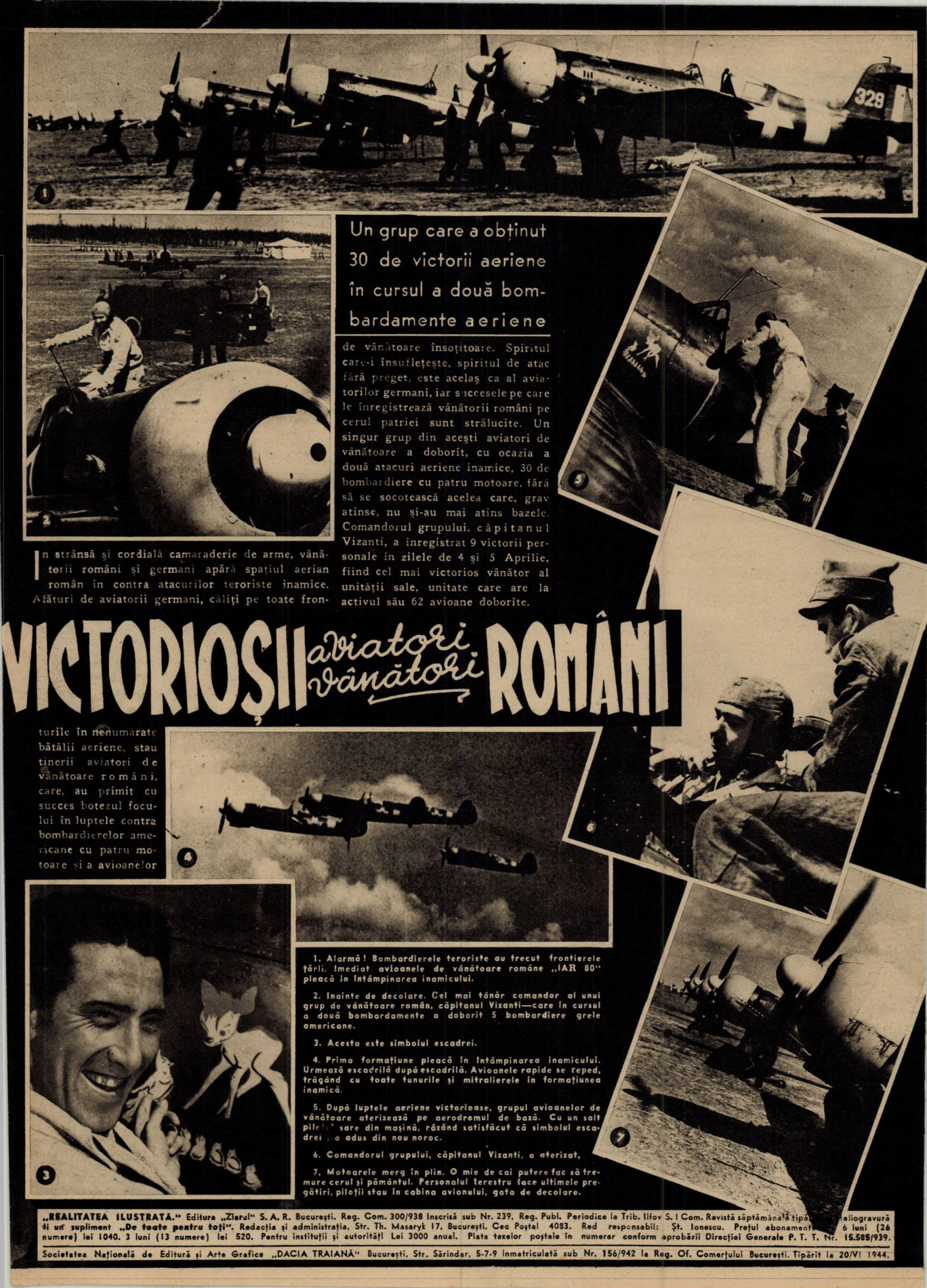
June 1944 article from Realitatea ilustrată magazine talking about the 6th Fighter Group

== See also ==
- Bombing of Romania in World War II

== Bibliography ==
- Axworthy, Mark (1995). Third Axis, Fourth Ally: Romanian Armed Forces in the European War, 1941–1945. London: Arms and Armour.
- Bernád, Dénes (20 June 2003). Rumanian Aces of World War 2. Osprey Publishing. ISBN 978-1-84176-535-8.
- Deletant, Dennis (2016). British Clandestine Activities in Romania during the Second World War. London: Palgrave Macmillan. ISBN 9781349555093.
- Macdonald, Patrick (1994). Through darkness to light. Upton-upon-Severn: Images. ISBN 9781897817179.
- Zaloga, Steven J. (2019). Ploesti 1943: The great raid on Hitler's Romanian oil refineries. Oxford: Osprey Publishing. ISBN 9781472831965.
