= Operation Reunion =

1944 US military operation aimed at repatriating Allied prisoners of war from Romania

- Part of Western Allied campaign in Romania
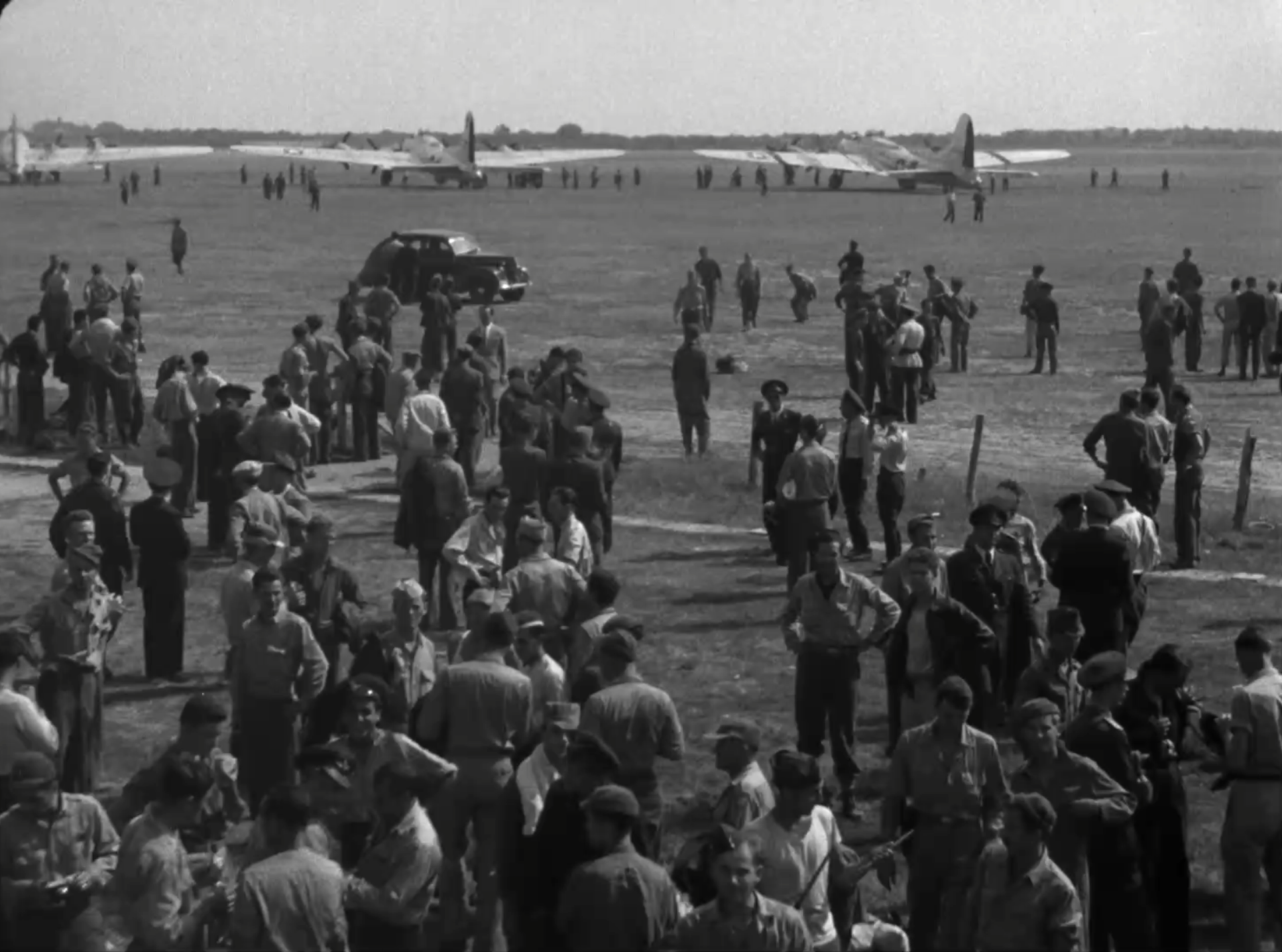
- Americans and Romanians at the Popești-Leordeni airfield with B-17 Flying Fortresses in the background
- Location: Popești-Leordeni, Romania; 44°22′15″N 26°11′39″E
- Planned: 28 August 1944
- Planned by: James A. Gunn III, Constantin Cantacuzino and Charles F. Born
- Commanded by: James A. Gunn III, George Kraigher
- Objective: Repatriation of Allied prisoners of war from Romania
- Date: 31 August – 3 September 1944
- Executed by: Fifteenth Air Force
- Outcome: POW repatriation completed

Operation Reunion was a USAAF military operation aimed at repatriating Allied prisoners of war from Romania after the latter's change of sides in 1944. The operation was preceded by Operation Gunn, named after Lieutenant Colonel (Lt. Col.) James A. Gunn, which had the objective of establishing the connection between Bucharest and the 15th Air Force command from Bari. During the operation, more than 1,000 American, British, Dutch, and French prisoners were airlifted to Italy.

== Background ==
After Romania entered World War II on the side of the Axis, the Western Allies launched an air campaign over the country which was mostly aimed at destroying Romania's oil refineries that were supplying the Axis forces. Other bombing raids were conducted over railroad yards, factories, and communication centers. Failing to achieve its objective, the campaign was called off on 19 August 1944 ahead of the Soviet major offensive against Romania. From the start of the campaign until its end, Allied forces lost some 324 aircraft, with 2,500 aviators lost of which more than 1,000 were still held prisoner in Romania by 1944.

=== 23 August and German reprisals ===
In the aftermath of King Michael's coup on 23 August 1944, the German troops from Bucharest were instructed by General Constantin Sănătescu, the new Prime Minister of Romania, to retreat towards the Hungarian border. However, when the retreating troops reached Băneasa on their way to Ploiești, General Alfred Gerstenberg, the commanding German general, ordered all remaining troops and the Luftwaffe units to return to Bucharest and occupy the airports of Băneasa and Otopeni. From there, the German airplanes began bombing the city.

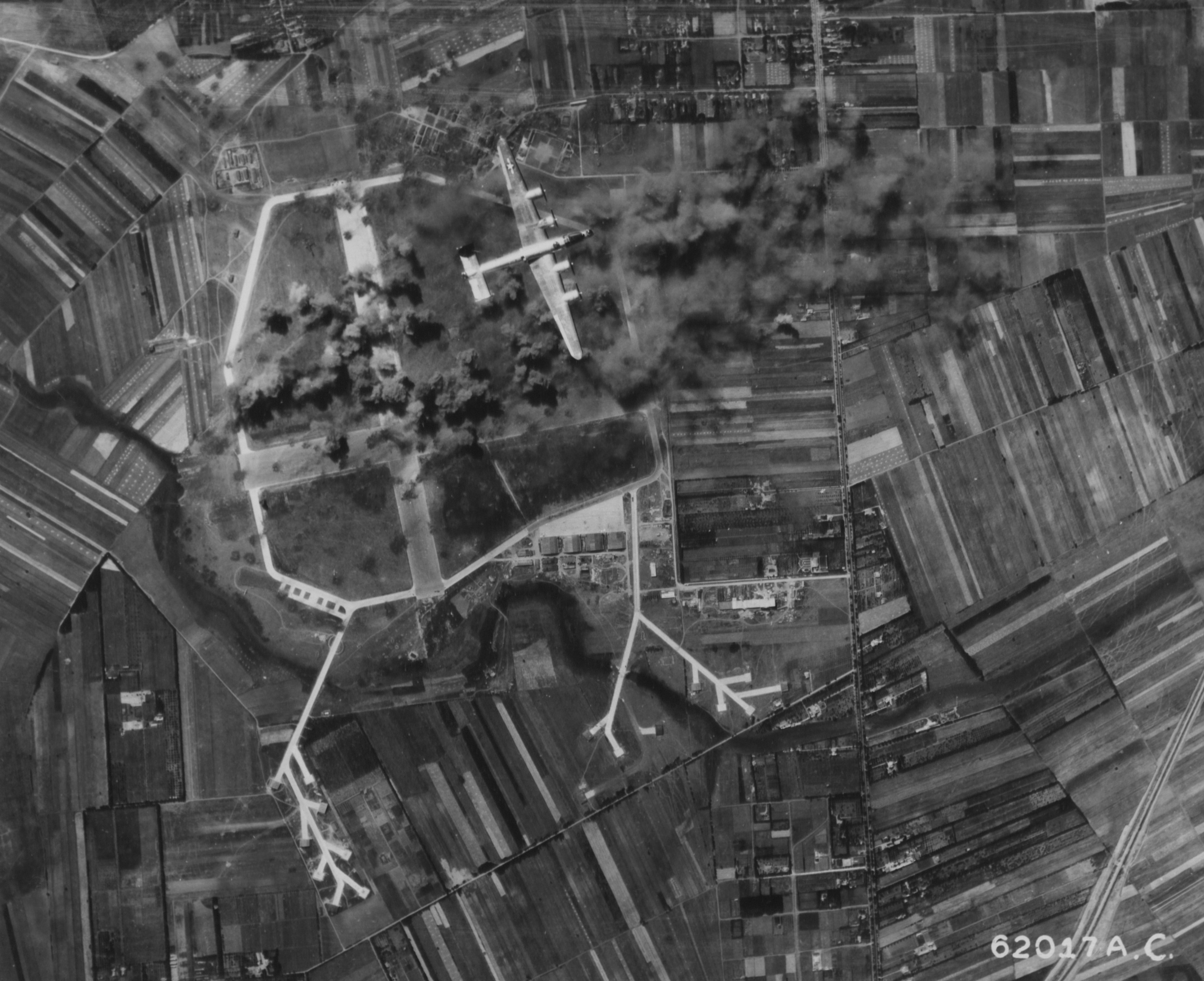
Bombing of the Otopeni airport by US B-24 bombers on 26 August

As the German raids continued, the Allied prisoners were released from the Timișul de Jos and Bucharest POW camps and allowed to hide in the trenches outside, being also given some firearms to defend themselves. At the same time, a delegation of the prisoners requested General Racoviță, the War Minister, that they should be organized into a combat unit under Romanian command to fight the Germans. Following the request, around 900 POWs from Bucharest were moved to the barracks of the 4th Vânători Regiment, south of Ghencea. They were given carbines, pistols, as well as two trucks and two motorcycles with sidecars, and were organized into a battalion of four companies. The American POW unit was short-lived, however, as the commanding Romanian officers determined that the American airmen lacked the discipline and training required to fight the Germans. The American prisoners were however instructed to travel in open top cars, if possible, so that the population could see them and inform their German friends that American troops were in Bucharest. Several Americans were killed during the German raids and others were wounded.

During this time, the problem of repatriating the Allied POWs before the arrival of Soviet troops, who could have used them as bargaining chips, also arose. As the highest ranking American officer, Lt. Col. James "Pappy" Gunn, former commander of the 454th Bombardment Group who was shot down on 17 August, devised a plan to repatriate the American and British airmen.

On 24 August, Gunn met with Valeriu "Rică" Georgescu, a former collaborator with the British Special Operations Executive who was released from prison on the same day. Georgescu also managed to contact the Cairo command via radio and requested an urgent airstrike over the German troop positions at Băneasa and Otopeni. At the same time, Georgescu introduced Gunn to Prime Minister Sănătescu, General Racoviță, and Iuliu Maniu, the leader of the National Peasants' Party.

The airstrike on the Băneasa and Otopeni airports took place on 26 August. It was carried out by 228 B-24 bombers of the 15th Air Force, escorted by 151 P-51 Mustangs.

== Preparations ==
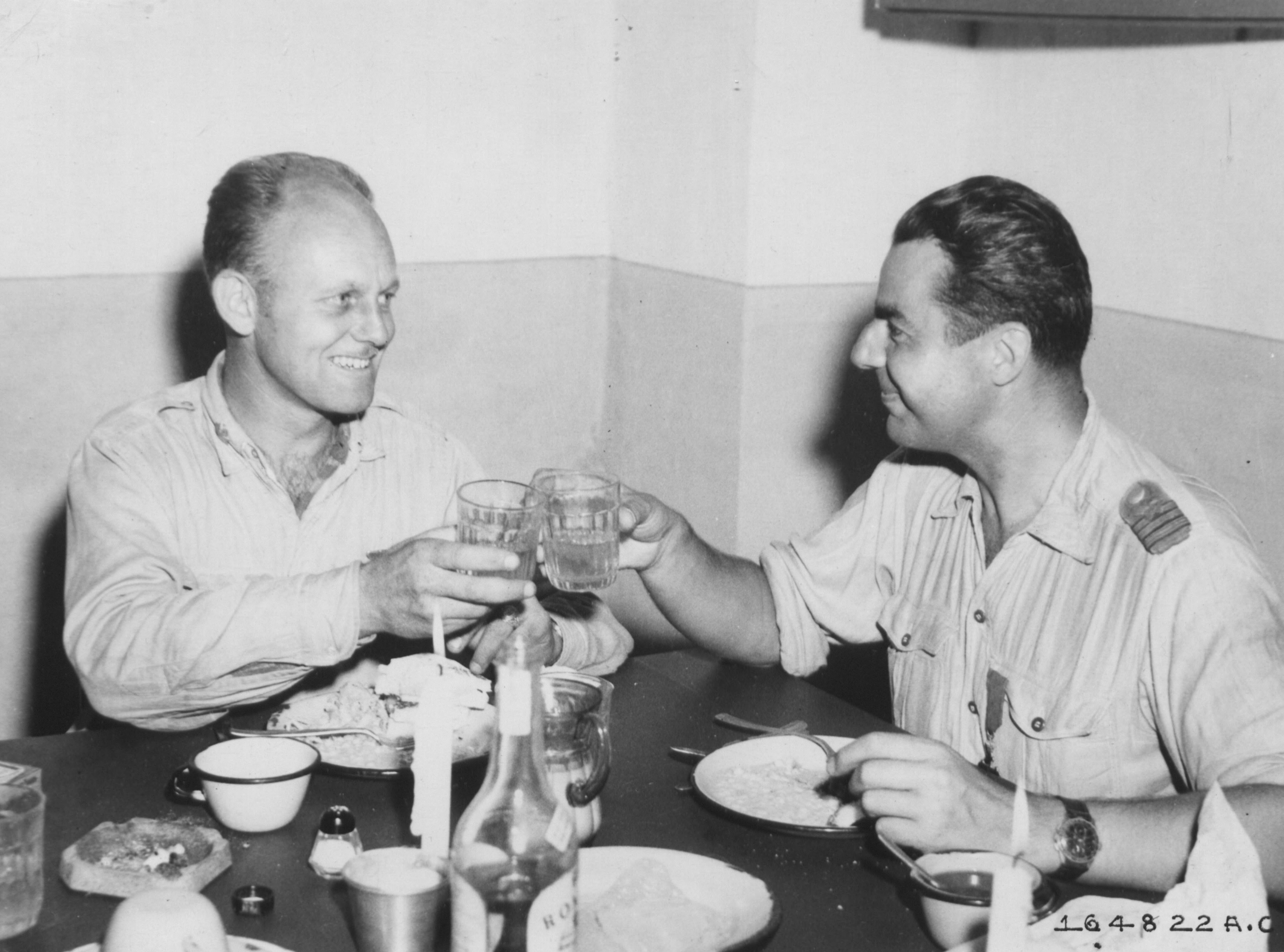
James Gunn (left) toasting with Constantin Cantacuzino

With the Germans cleared out and the bombing raids stopped, Rică Georgescu took Lt. Col. Gunn to the Popești-Leordeni airfield where they met with Captain (Cpt.) Constantin "Bâzu" Cantacuzino, Romania's leading ace and commander of the 9th Fighter Group. After discussions, Cantacuzino proposed that Gunn fly to Italy in a SM 79 bomber of the Royal Romanian Air Force. After obtaining the necessary permission from the Ministry of Air, Gunn departed aboard the bomber. However, the aircraft returned after a 30-minute flight as it had encountered problems with its Jumo 211 engines. Undeterred, Cantacuzino offered to fly Gunn to Italy himself with his Messerschmitt Bf 109.

Later that day, the fighter was prepared with the radio equipment being removed to make room for the passenger, and being painted with American markings and a large American flag on each side of the fuselage and wings. Though scheduled to depart in the morning on 28 August, Cantacuzino and Gunn agreed to leave earlier to maintain secrecy, only informing Georgescu, the Minister of War, and the Undersecretary of State for the Air about their decision. Thus, on 27 August at 5:20 PM, the two began the journey under the pretext of checking if there was enough space for Gunn in the aircraft. Although Gunn recommended that they should fly "on the deck" to avoid detection by German radar, Cantacuzino preferred to fly at 4,600 m (15,000 ft) due to his low confidence in the Bf 109 on such a long journey. After a two-hour flight, Cantacuzino's Bf 109G-6 reached the San Giovanni airfield near Cerignola by following a map sketched out by Gunn. As instructed by the American officer, Cantacuzino lowered the flaps and landing gear and wagged the wings from side to side before touching down. After landing, Cantacuzino taxied over to some base personnel and asked for a screwdriver which he then used to open the radio compartment of the airplane and retrieve Gunn. Once he recovered, as he suffered from hypoxia due to a lack of oxygen during the flight, Gunn contacted the 15th Air Force command.

=== Operation Gunn ===
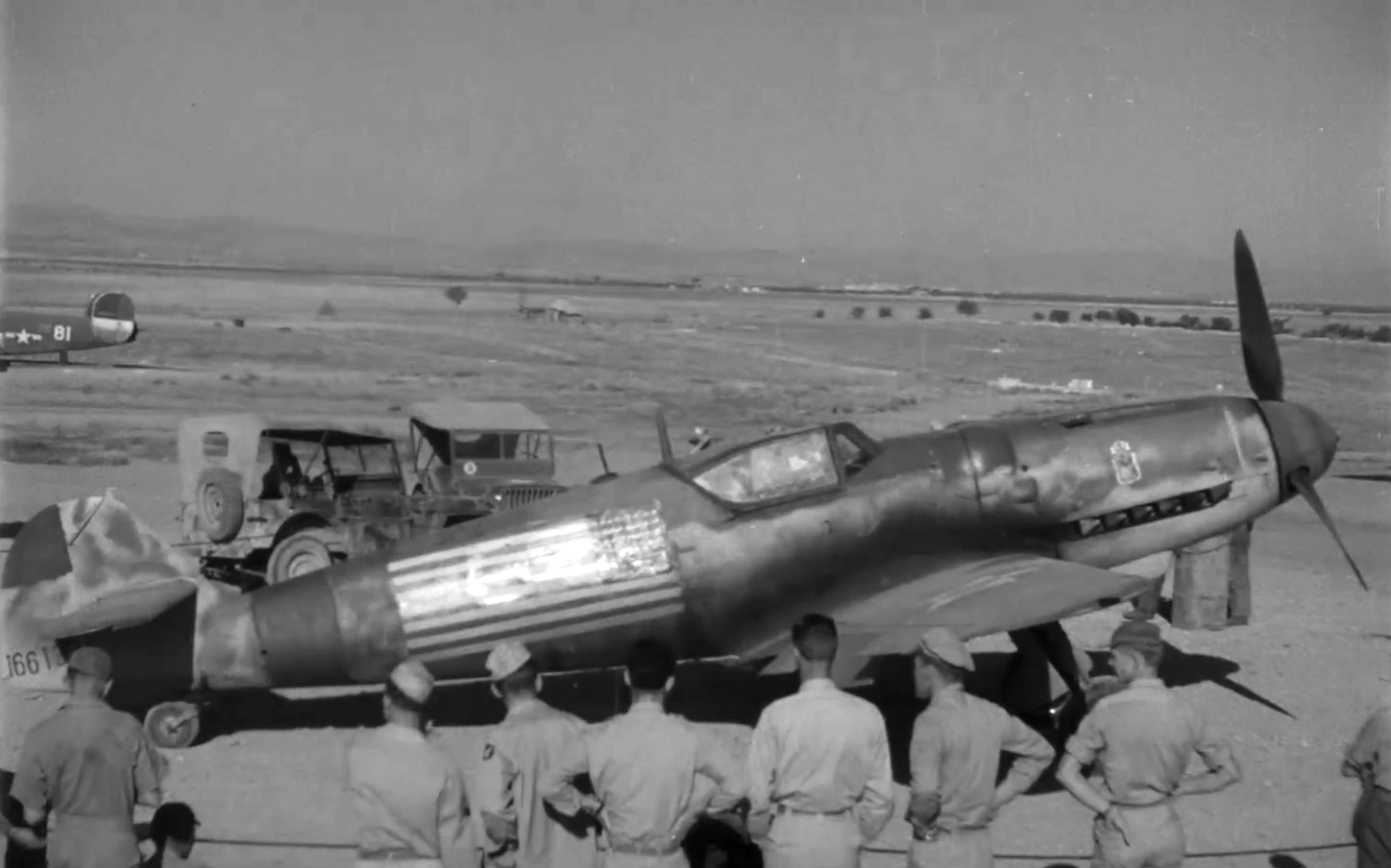
Cantacuzino's Bf 109G-6 at San Giovanni airfield

The two were then transported to Bari where, together with General Charles F. Born, began drafting a plan to recover the prisoners from Romania. The initial plan was finished on 28 August. It was to be called Operation Gunn, after Lt. Col. Gunn, and it had the objective of establishing communications between Bari and Bucharest. It was divided in two stages: the first with Cpt. Cantacuzino flying back to Romania to confirm that the Popești-Leordeni airfield was still under Romanian control, and the second with two B-17 bombers transporting radio equipment and personnel to Romania.

Since an American airman ground looped and damaged Cantacuzino's Messerschmitt, the Romanian pilot was offered a P-51 Mustang to fly. The task of training Cantacuzino on the Mustang was given to Cpt. Walter J. Goehausen, who only taught him the basic controls of the Mustang. Once in the air for a test flight, Bâzu began performing some aerobatic maneuvers and landed the airplane "as if he had always flown it".

Cantacuzino was to be escorted by three other Mustangs who were ordered to shoot him down if anything suspicious happened. They were to take off on 29 August and once at Popești-Leordeni, Cantacuzino was to land and assess the situation on the airfield. Afterwards, he was to signal the escorting P-51s by firing a double yellow flare if the airfield was still in Romanian control, a double red flare if the airfield was not safe, and a single green flare if the escorting fighters should wait a further five minutes. If no signal came within 15 minutes, it was assumed that the area was not safe to land.

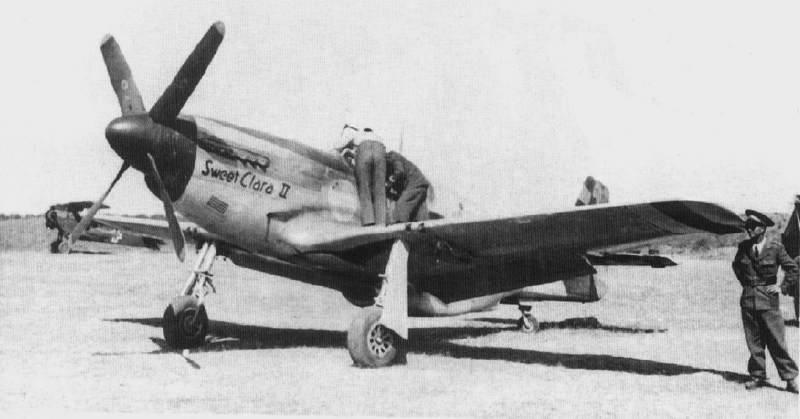
P-51B "Sweet Clara II" of the 319th Fighter Squadron flown by Cantacuzino in Romania

To keep the mission a secret from both the Germans and the Soviets, the American pilots were to transmit the codes "I have six zero six gallons of gas, repeat I have six zero six" if the airfield was safe, and "ceiling and visibility zero zero, repeat zero zero" if it was not. If the positive code was received, the two B-17s were to take off from the Bari airfield under the escort of two formations of 16 P-51s each. After receiving a signal from the ground, and after the escort fighters scouted the area, the B-17s were to land, unload the equipment and personnel, take a maximum of 10 POWs if any were present on the airfield, and take off immediately.

While in flight over Yugoslavia, Cantacuzino unexpectedly broke off from the formation and fired his aircraft's machine guns once before returning to his place. The American airmen later explained the gesture as Cantacuzino checking if his aircraft was armed in case any German airplanes might attack them. The rest of the mission went as planned, with Cantacuzino sending the signal that the airfield was safe, the escorting Mustangs then transmitted the message which was received by a weather airplane over Yugoslavia and further relayed to Bari. The two B-17s transporting the OSS personnel under Colonel George Kraigher, the commander of the Air Crew Rescue Unit, landed safely in Romania and were greeted by Rică Georgescu, who by this point was assigned as State Secretary for the Ministry of Economy. As radio contact with Bari failed to be achieved the next day, Cpt. Cantacuzino took his P-51 back to Italy with a letter containing the necessary information for Operation Reunion which was to start on 31 August.

== Operation Reunion ==
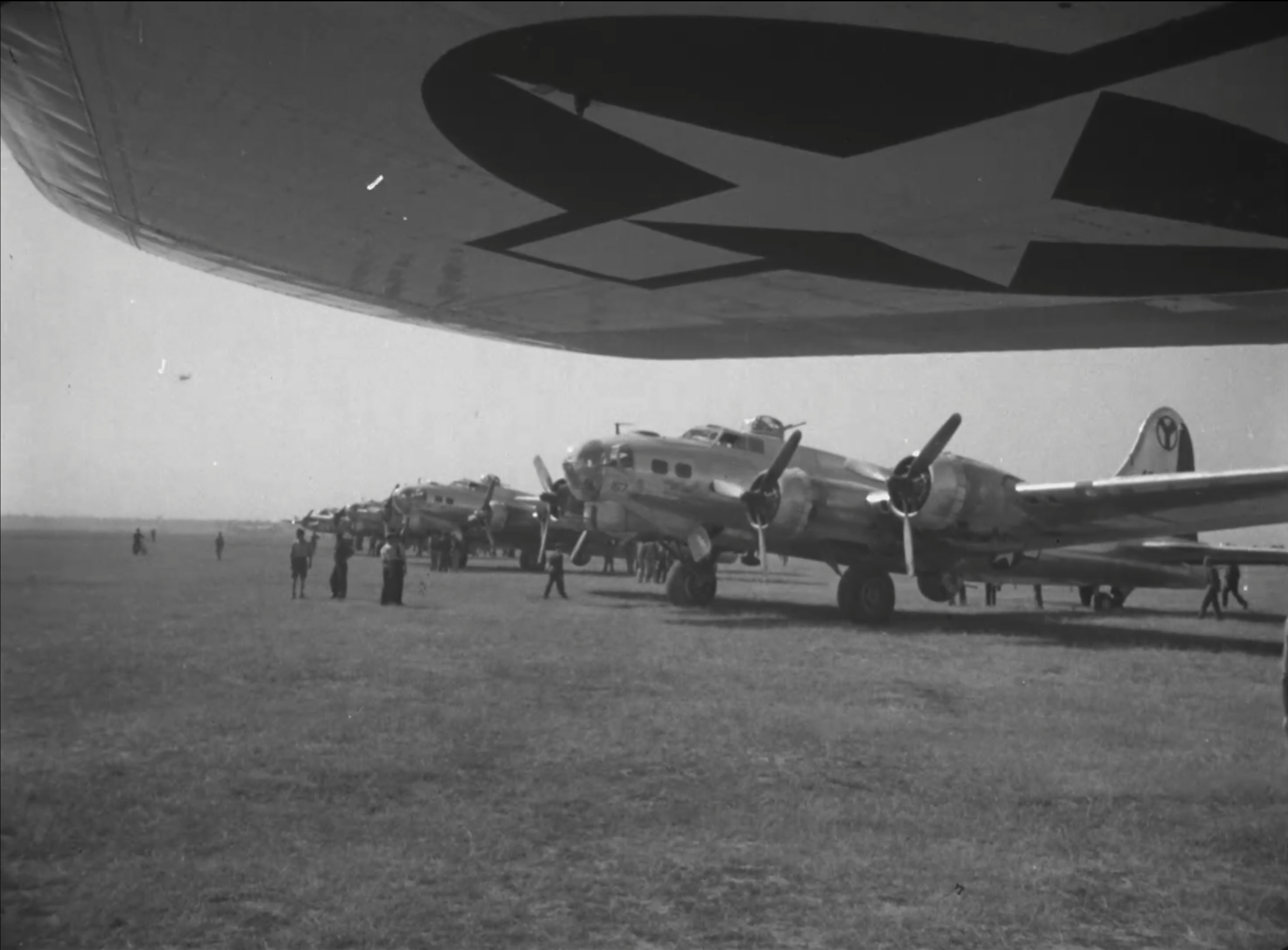
B-17 Flying Fortress bombers lined up on the Popești-Leordeni airfield

The B-17s that were to fly on the mission were reconfigured to hold as many as twenty passengers in their bomb bays, with a few bombers also modified to hold up to ten stretcher patients who needed more medical attention. The bomber crews were reduced from nine or ten to six to make room for more personnel.

As some ex-prisoners were scattered around the country with the help of the locals, radio broadcasts and press releases were sent out with instructions that they needed to report to Hotel Ambasador, the headquarters of the OSS mission, for evacuation. To secure the transport of prisoners to the airfield, Secretary Georgescu arranged with Colonel Victor Dombrovski, the Mayor of Bucharest, the requisition of some 57 buses from the capital. Some of the buses had to be driven as far as Brașov to collect the prisoners who were not in Bucharest. The wounded POWs were accompanied to the airfield by Catherine Caradja and two American medics.

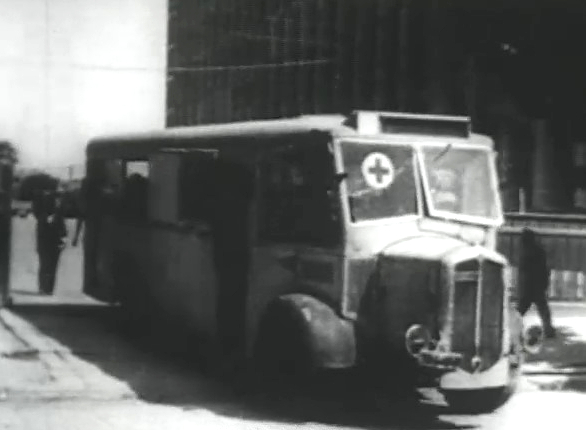
A Bucharest bus used to transport POWs

On 31 August, as Soviet troops were entering Bucharest, the first 38 B-17s, all from the 5th Bomb Wing, flew from their bases in Italy to Popești-Leordeni in four waves, returning fully loaded with POWs. Fighter cover was provided by P-38 Lightnings of the 1st, 14th, and 82nd Fighter Groups, and P-51 Mustangs of the 31st, 325th, and 332nd Fighter Groups. The first day of the operation finished with 740 evacuees reaching Bari. On the return journey, several Romanian Bf 109s also joined the escort of the bombers until Lightnings took over in Yugoslavia.

On 1 September, 16 B-17s flew to Romania being escorted by the Tuskegee airmen of the 332nd Fighter Group. The bombers carried 20 passengers each, with one B-17 carrying 10 stretcher patients. On the last day of the operation, after a break on 2 September, three B-17s and a C-47 Skytrain picked up the last passengers.

The operation concluded with the Fifteenth Air Force airlifting 1,161 ex-prisoners of which 1,127 American, 31 British, two Dutch, one French, and a Romanian who claimed to be an American citizen. A total of 59 B-17s, 94 P-38s, 281 P-51s, and a C-47 took part in the operation. No serious enemy opposition was encountered, only moderate flak fire, two Ju 52s which were both shot down, and two Bf 109s of which one was damaged. One P-38 was lost during the mission.

== Aftermath ==
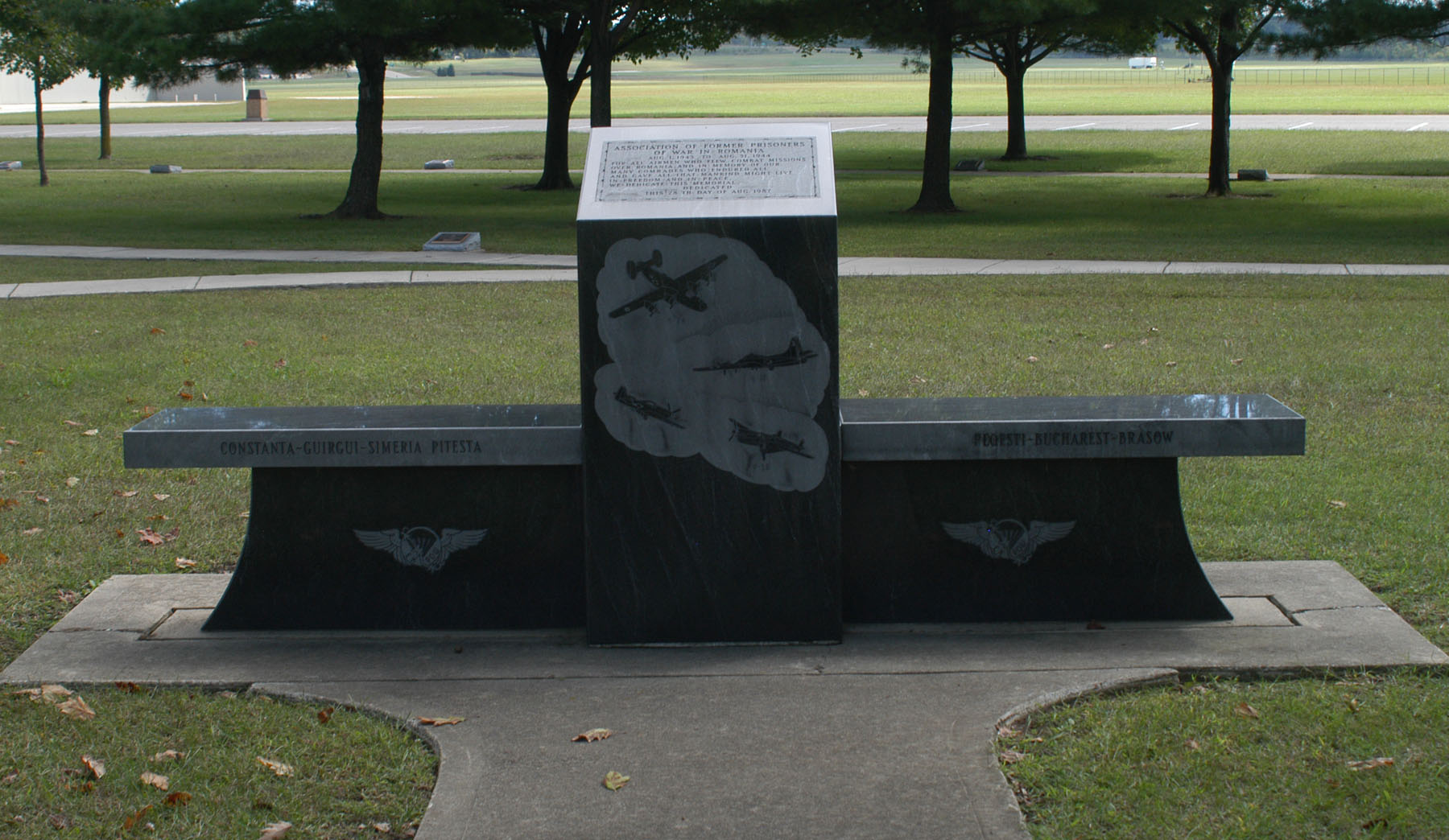
Former American POWs of Romania memorial

After being transported to Italy, the ex-prisoners were taken to the United States by ship and demobilized. With the conclusion of the mission, several US generals including Ira C. Eaker and Nathan F. Twining, traveled to Bucharest to personally thank King Michael, Secretary Georgescu, and the others who had helped in the mission. After Reunion, a further two airlift missions were carried out in Romania – one with two B-17s on 6 September, and one on 8 September with another two B-17s.

Lt. Col. James Gunn was proposed to receive the Medal of Honor in the 1990s, but was posthumously decorated with the Silver Star in 2014.

A monument honoring the American prisoners from Romania was built in the Memorial Park of the National Museum of the United States Air Force. On the 70-year anniversary of the operation, an event was organized by the Association of Former Prisoners of War in Romania and with support from the US Embassy, in which relatives of the former prisoners visited the locations of the POW camps and funds were gathered for donating to a charity in Romania.

== See also ==
- Romania–United States relations
- Vin americanii!
- Operation Halyard - rescue operation of downed Allied airmen from Yugoslavia

== Bibliography ==
- Armă, Alexandru (2020). "Repatrierea prizonierilor americani și britanici din România". Historia (in Romanian). No. 216. ISSN 1582-7968.
- Mahoney, Kevin A. (2013). Fifteenth Air Force against the Axis: Combat Missions over Europe during World War II. Lanham, Maryland: Scarecrow Press. ISBN 9780810884953.
- Schultz, Duane (2013). "The Pilot, the Prince, and the Rescue" (PDF). Military History Quarterly. No. Autumn 2013. Historynet LLC. ISSN 1040-5992. Archived from the original (PDF) on 18 January 2024.
- Zaloga, Steven J. (2019). Ploesti 1943: The great raid on Hitler's Romanian oil refineries. Oxford: Osprey Publishing. ISBN 9781472831965.
