= Bombing of Bucharest in World War II =

Bucharest World War II bombings
- Part of Western Allied campaign in Romania and Strategic bombing campaign in Europe
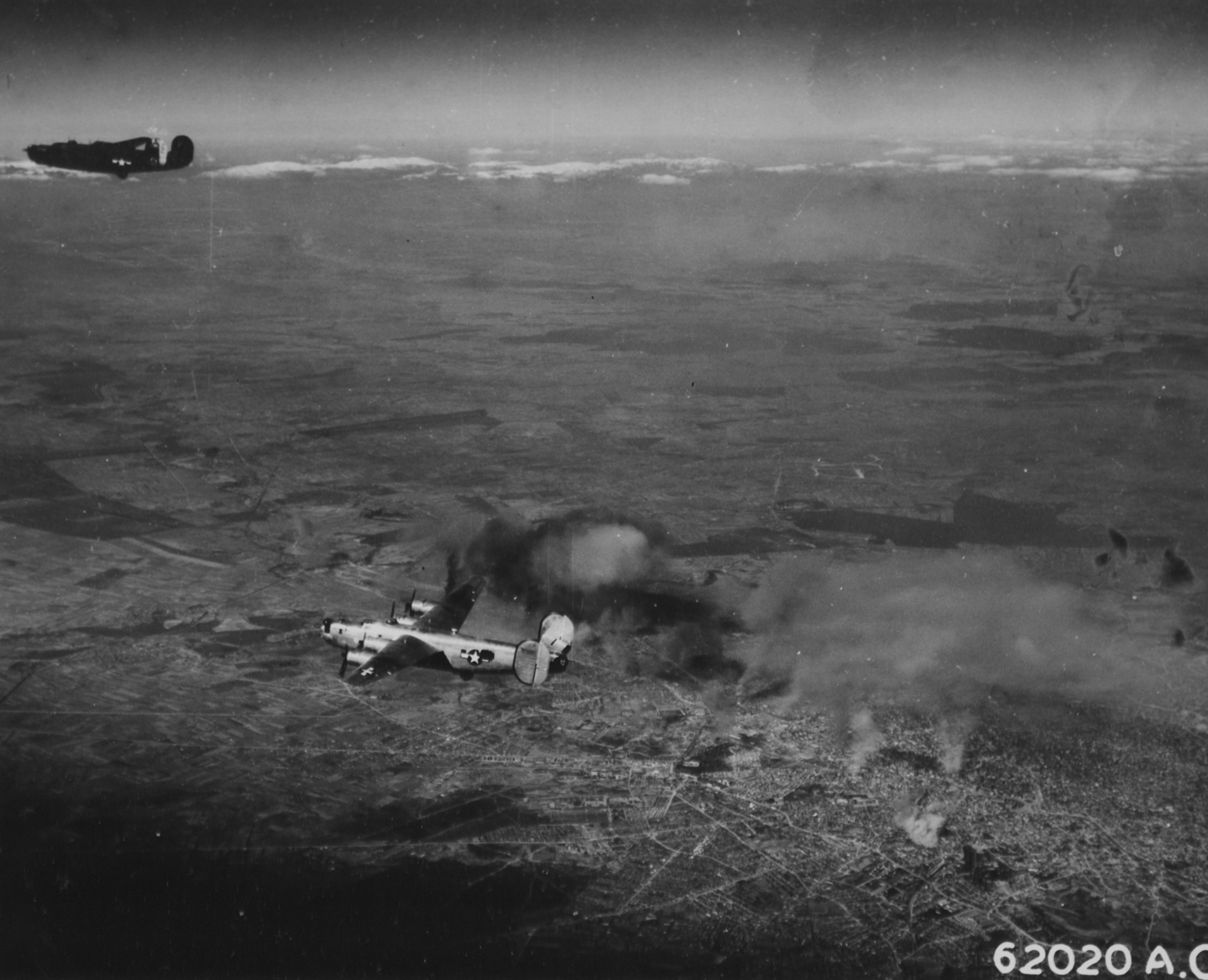
- B-24 Liberator bombers of the 455th Bombardment Group over Bucharest on 4 April 1944
| Date | April 4 to August 26, 1944 |
| Location | Bucharest, Kingdom of Romania |

Belligerents
| (United States) Fifteenth Air Force (United Kingdom) No. 205 Group | (Romania) Royal Romanian Air Force (Nazi Germany) Luftwaffe |

Commanders and leaders
| (United States) Carl Spaatz (United Kingdom) Arthur Tedder | (Romania) Gheorghe Jienescu (Nazi Germany) Alfred Gerstenberg |

Casualties and losses
- Civilians: 5,524 killed, 3,373 wounded

The Bucharest World War II bombings were primarily Allied bombings of railroad targets and those of the Oil Campaign of World War II, but included a bombing by Nazi Germany after the 1944 coup d'état. Bucharest stored and distributed much of Ploiești's refined oil products.

The first operation was a sequence of 17 aerial bombardments, starting with the one of April 4, 1944. The bombings were carried out over a period of about 4 months by the United States Army Air Forces and the British Royal Air Force, with approximately 3,640 bombers of different types, accompanied by about 1,830 fighters. As collateral damage, 5,524 inhabitants were killed, 3,373 were injured, and 47,974 were left homeless. The second operation was executed by the German Luftwaffe in retaliation for Romania having changed sides (immediately after the fall of the fascist regime headed by Ion Antonescu), and took place on August 23–26, 1944.

== Raids ==
Chronology
| Date | Target/Topic | |
|---|---|---|
| 1944-04-04 | Railroad targets | 93 B-17s & 220 B-24s of the US 15th AF escorted by 119 P-38s, after taking the usual route past Turnu Severin, across the Southern Carpathians, and up to Târgoviște and Snagov, attacked at 1345 hrs. Fifteen minutes before the attack, the citizens of Bucharest were alerted by air-raid alarms, but the majority could not bother, expecting another practice alert. When the raid commenced, the majority of the population were exposed and numerous casualties occurred due to exposure, shock, and suffocation. The principal target was the Bucharest marshalling yard, Gara de Nord (tracks were destroyed). Warm weather and strong wind deflected bombs which landed on Calea Griviței and Giulești and western/north-western Bucharest was severely hit, destroying hundreds of buildings and killing or injuring over 5,000. Bombs fell on Calea Victoriei, on the Splendid and Athénée Palace Hotels; on the German Military Mission; near Saint Joseph Cathedral (destroying its stained-glass windows); and on Cotroceni, uprooting poplars in the Botanical Garden. One bomb shelter was also destroyed. USAAF losses: ten B-24s lost from enemy aircraft (flak was slight and inaccurate over the target), and 13 B-24s were damaged and returned. The 449th BG lost seven B-24s: from the 717th BS were Reluctant Liz, Miasis Dragon, and from the 719th BS, Consolidated Mess, Dixie Belle, Paper Doll #42-7691, Born to Lose, and B-24 #41-28655. The 376th, 454th, and 459th Bomb Groups each lost one B-24. Claims by the USAAF: destroyed/probable/damaged Luftwaffe aircraft were 32/6/5 Bf 109, 6/5/1 Fw 190, (Note: Note: The Fw 190s in USAAF reports are likely misidentified IAR 80s.) 1/0/0 Me 210, and 0/2/0 Ju 88. Luftwaffe and Royal Romanian Air Force (ARR) registered losses: 1 IAR 80 (ARR), 2 Bf 110 (ARR), 5 Bf 109 (Luftwaffe). |
| 1944-04-15 | Railroad targets | 257 B-24s escorted by 149 P-38s and 38 P-47s. First large-scale use of the PFF radar by the 15th AF. 461st Bombardment Group B-24s targeted the Chitila Marshalling Yard in Bucharest. Nine-tenths cloud coverage over the target prevented the crews from observing the effect of the bombing. Official records do not list the damage. Other sources report that the University of Bucharest was damaged and the adjacent Cartea Românească building was destroyed in bombing raid. USAAF losses: four P-38s (from the 14th FG), four B-24s (three from the 460th BG, and one from the 451st BG which crashed in Turkey). |
| 1944-04-21 | Railroad targets | 91 unescorted B-24s of the 15th AF bombed the marshalling yards at Bucharest. No results were observed because of the weather. Flak fire was reported intense and accurate. USAAF losses: eight B-24s (four from the 455th BG and two each from the 454th and 456th BG). |
| 1944-04-24 | Railroad targets | 207 B-24s of the 15th AF escorted by 48 P-38s bombed the marshalling yards at Bucharest. The bombers damaged repair buildings, a roundhouse, tracks and choke points. Some bombs also fell on the city. USAAF losses: two B-24s (451st and 461st BG). |
| 1944-05-07 | Railroad targets | 157 B-17s and 272 B-24s under the escort of 163 P-38s and 36 P-51s bombed the Grivița and Chitila marshalling yards. The 449th and 450th, as well as most of the 459th BG returned without bombing. At Grivița, an engine depot, warehouses, workshops, and a fuel storage tank were damaged, while at Chitila freight cars were destroyed. Some bombs also landed in the city. USAAF losses: one B-17 from 97th BG, and three B-24s (two from the 454th and one from the 98th BG). |
| 1944-05-07/08 | Industrial and railroad targets | No. 205 Group RAF conducted a night raid on industrial targets and railway yards North West of Bucharest. 76.2 tons of bombs were dropped on the main railway yards and military barracks. Four bombers were lost: two Wellingtons from No. 40 Squadron, one from No. 150 Squadron, and one from No. 70 Squadron. |
| 1944-06-10 | Româno-Americană oil works, Ploiești | Raid by US P-38s. P-38s were used as it was felt that a low level dive-bombing attack could be more effective than the Tidal Wave high-level bombing where the targets were obscured by defensive smoke screens. The raid took place with three squadrons of 82d Fighter Group doing the attack (95th, 96th, 97th Squadrons) with three 1st Fighter Group squadrons (also P-38s) providing escorts (27th, 71st and 94th Squadrons). Mission was flown from Foggia airfields in Italy against Româno-Americană oil works in Ploiești. Attack P-38s carried a 1,000 lb bomb under one fuselage and a long-range tank under the other. The 71st FS also attacked the Popești-Leordeni airfield south of Bucharest. The success was described as "an incremental contribution to previous bombing missions." USAAF losses: 1st FG lost 14 P-38s and 82nd FG nine aircraft, translating to 30% losses – equivalent to those of Tidal-Wave (but fewer manpower losses due to single crew aircraft being used as opposed to heavy bombers). |
| 1944-06-28 | Oil refineries | The 464th BG & 465th BG bombed the Prahova oil refinery (44°27'00"N / 26°08'40"E) and the 460th BG and 485th BG bombed the Titan-Malaxa oil refinery (44°26'10"N / 26°11'13"E). USAAF losses: three B-24s (from the 485th BG). |
| 1944-07-02/03 | Oil refineries | No. 205 Group attacked the Prahova Oil Refinery with 31 Wellingtons, 9 Liberators and 8 Halifaxes. Two Wellingtons of No. 40 Sqr and one Liberator of 31 Squadron SAAF were shot down. |
| 1944-07-03 | Oil refineries | The Mogoșoaia Oil Storage facility, the Prahova Oil Refinery, and the Titan Oil Refinery were attacked by B-24s. Bombs missed the Titan refinery and hit a nearby brick factory. Thirteen bombers of the 461st BG turned back and bombed the Iron Gate Rail Embankment at Turnu Severin instead. USAAF losses: two B-24s (451st and 461st BG). |
| 1944-07-27/28 | Oil refineries | 90 aircraft attacked in two waves, only 50 Wellingtons hit the main target of Prahova Oil Refinery due to the weather. Damage was sustained by The National Bank building, and Băneasa Airport, as well as other buildings. At least one Wellington from No. 150 Sqr was shot down. |
| 1944-07-31 | Oil refineries | Two oil refineries at Bucharest, one at Doicești, and oil storage at Târgoviște were bombed. Twenty B-24s struck the Creditul Minier refinery. USAAF losses: four P-51s (two from 52nd FG, one each from 31st and 325th FG), two B-24s (451st and 376th BG). |
| 1944-08-06 | Railroad targets, airfields | 60 fighters from Operation Frantic bases in the Soviet Union attacked the Craiova marshalling yard and other railroad targets in the Bucharest–Ploiești area claiming an He 111 and multiple locomotives. The fighters landed at Italian bases. |
| 1944-08-17/18 | Oil refineries | No. 205 Group targeted oil refineries with 63 Wellingtons from 231, 236, and 330 Wings; 9 Liberators from 2 SAAF Wing; 6 Halifaxes from 614 Sqn. Raid was aimed at destroying remaining intact refineries. Original target for the raid was the Standard Oil Refinery, but this had been successfully attacked during the day by American Forces and at 16:00 the attack was changed to the Xenia refinery. Remaining aircraft reached the target but AA defences were very active as was the smoke screen resulting in no aircraft being able to pinpoint the target. Bombers were attacked by Ju 88 and Bf 109's. 86 tons of bombs dropped but the raid was considered as unsuccessful. Twenty-two aircraft returned to bases because of mechanical failures, 3 performed emergency landings en route and 3 were reported missing. |
| 1944-08-24 & 25 | Various targets | Luftwaffe He 111, Ju 87 and Bf 110 bombers escorted by Bf 109 fighters based at Otopeni and Băneasa attacked Bucharest between 24 and 26 August, both during the day and night. The National Theatre Bucharest and many other downtown buildings were destroyed while the Royal Palace, the Victoria Palace, and the Romanian Athenaeum were seriously damaged. ARR claimed 45 German aircraft shot down (22 by fighters and 23 by the anti-aircraft artillery), including three Me 323 Gigants and four Ju 52s transporting Brandenburgers special forces. Another five aircraft were destroyed on the ground. The ARR lost four aircraft in the air (including a friendly fire incident), and another 30 aircraft on the ground. |
| 1944-08-26 | Otopeni, Băneasa | 228 B-24s of the 15th AF escorted by 151 P-51s attacked Luftwaffe bases at the Otopeni and Băneasa airports and the German positions in the Băneasa Forest. The Germans suffered heavy casualties and Luftwaffe raids on Bucharest stopped. The Romanian 4th Paratroop Battalion also lost half of a company in the bombardment around Băneasa due to inaccuracy and poor coordination. The hangars, workshops and barracks of Băneasa were damaged and 15 aircraft were claimed destroyed on the ground. Otopeni sustained damages to both runways, administrative buildings, barracks, as well as one hangar, and 6 aircraft were claimed destroyed on the ground. USAAF losses: three B-24s (two from the 455th BG, one from the 461st BG), one P-51 from the 332nd FG. |

== Gallery ==
Bombing of Bucharest
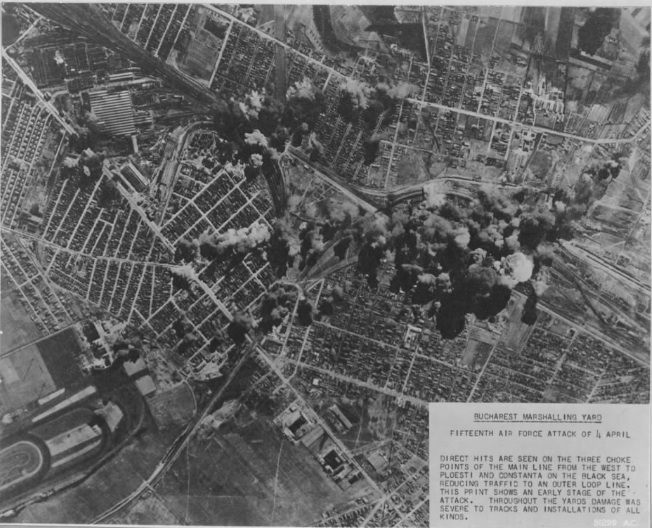
Bombing of the Gara de Nord marshalling yard, April, 1944.

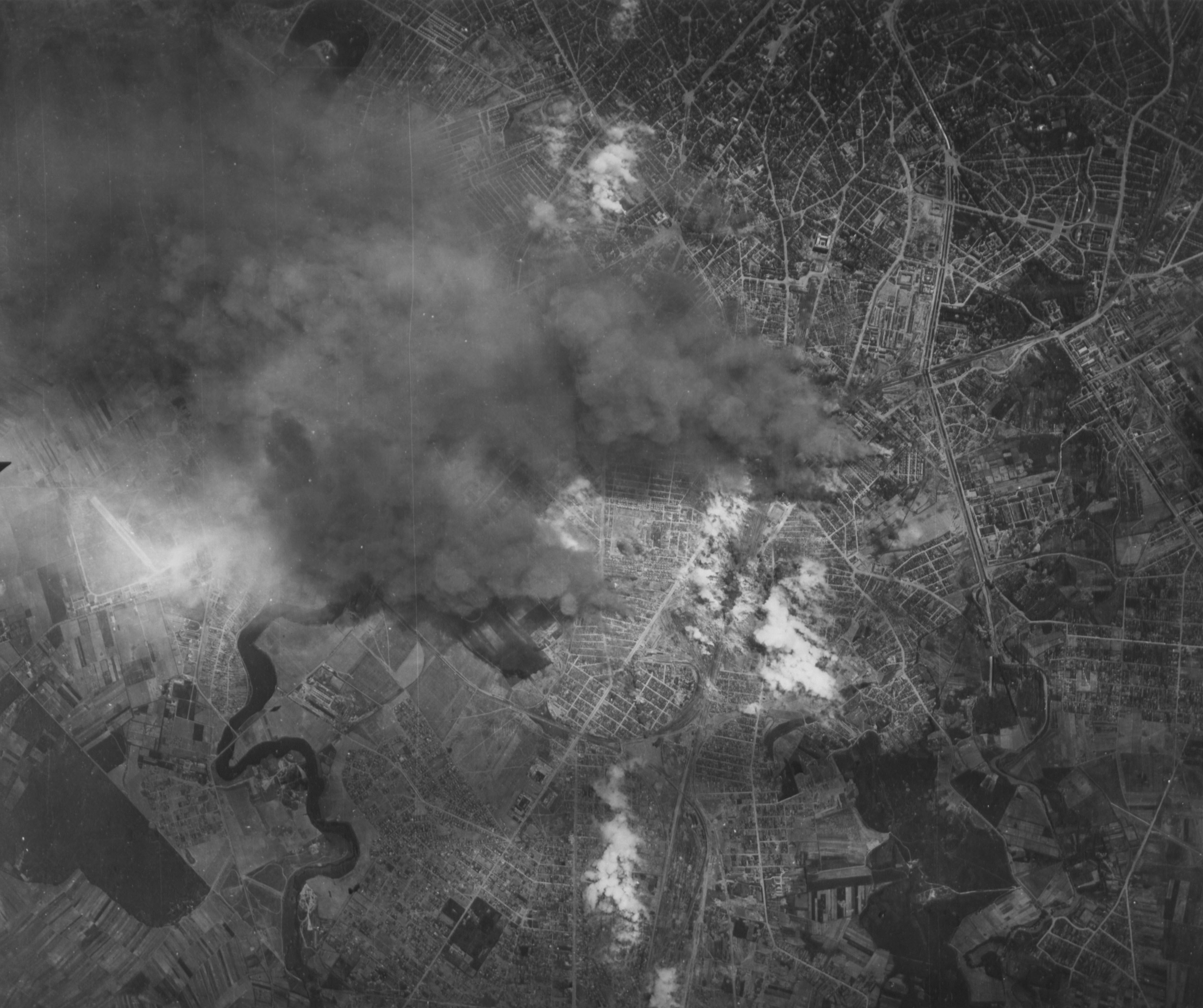
7 May 1944 air raid on the marshalling yards of Bucharest carried out by the 98th Bombardment Group.

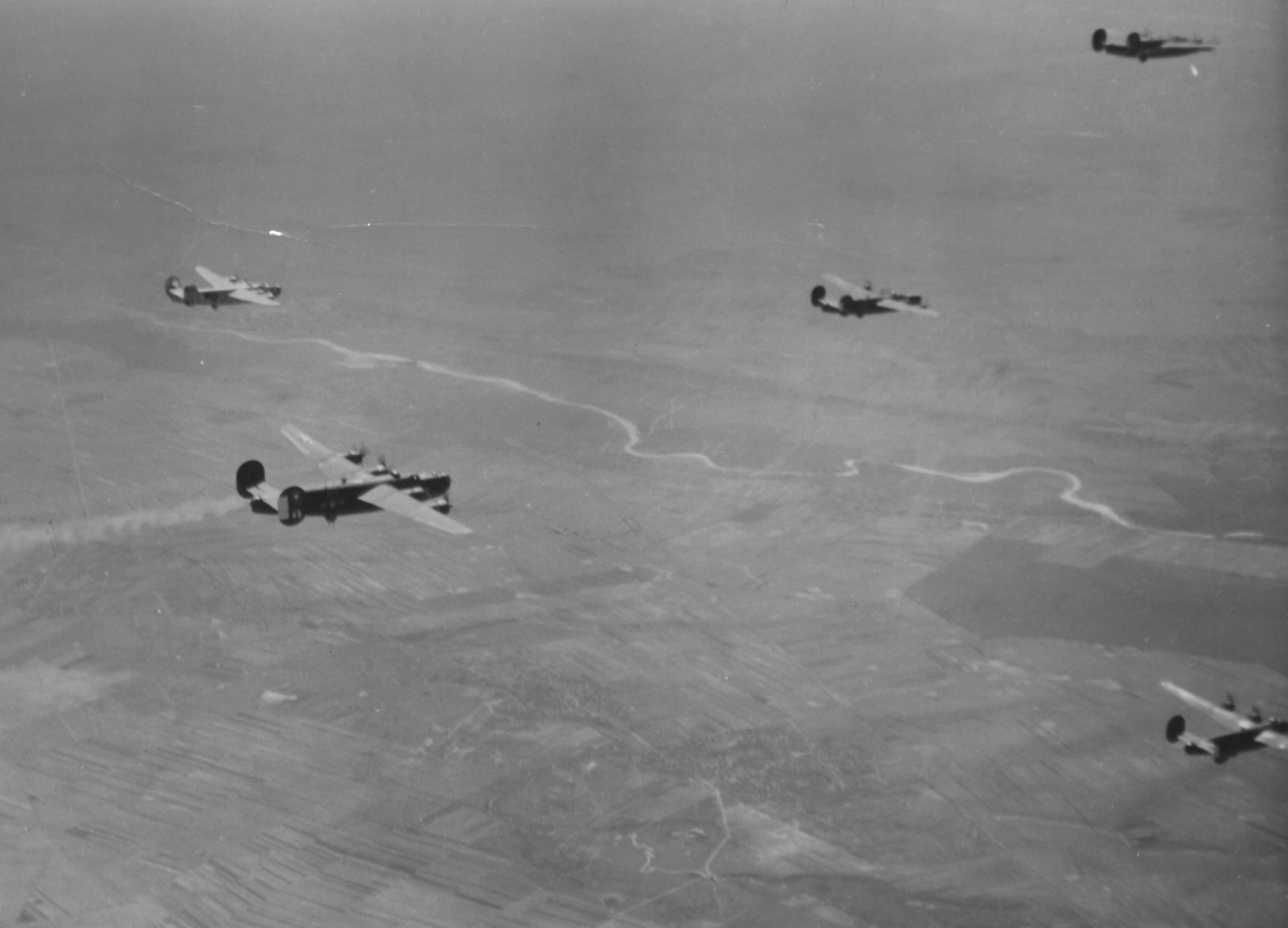
B-24 formation on a mission to Bucharest in 1944. Note the damaged bomber with the smoking engine.

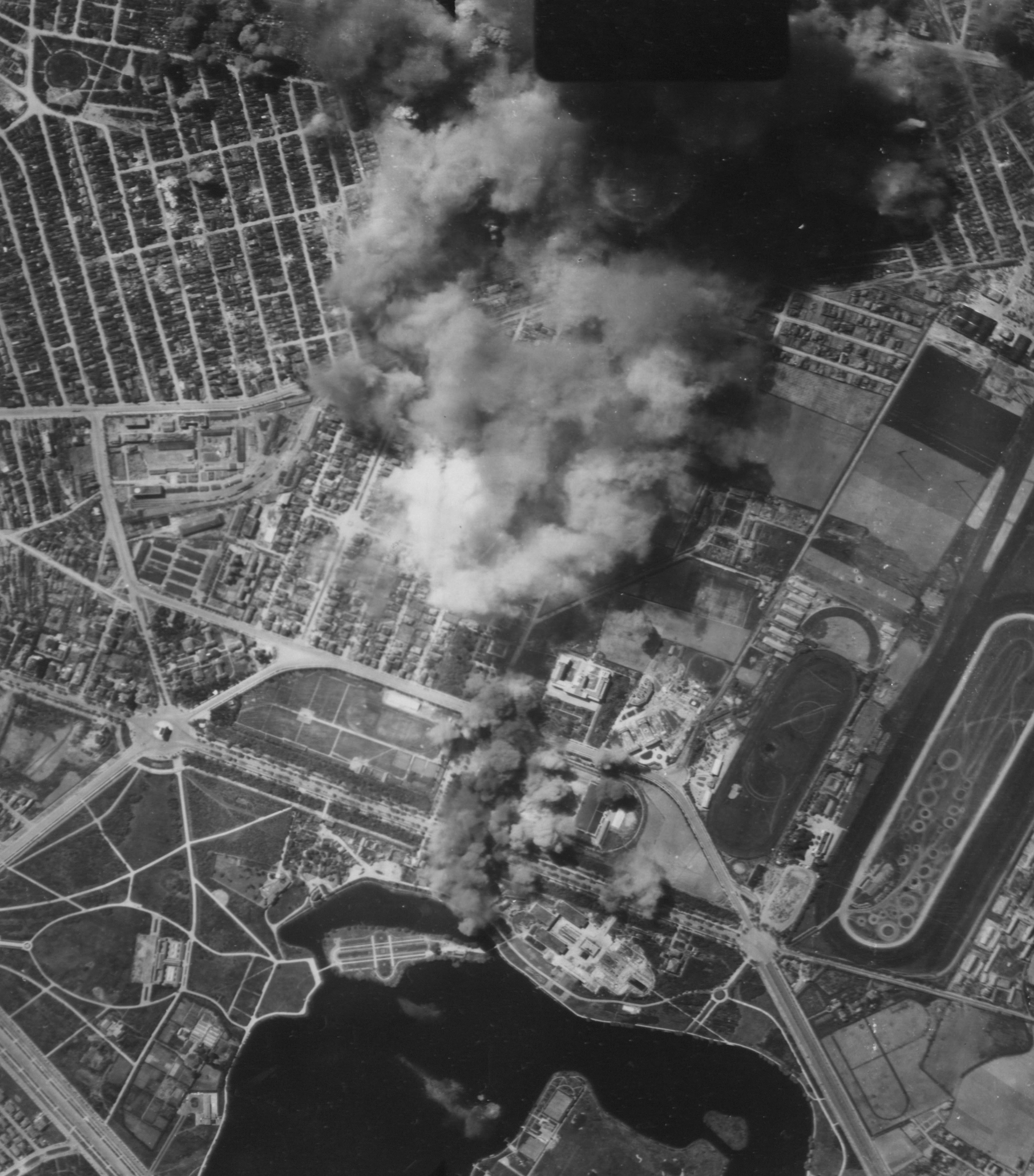
Bombs dropped by the 456th Bombardment Group on marshalling yards in Bucharest, 24 April 1944.

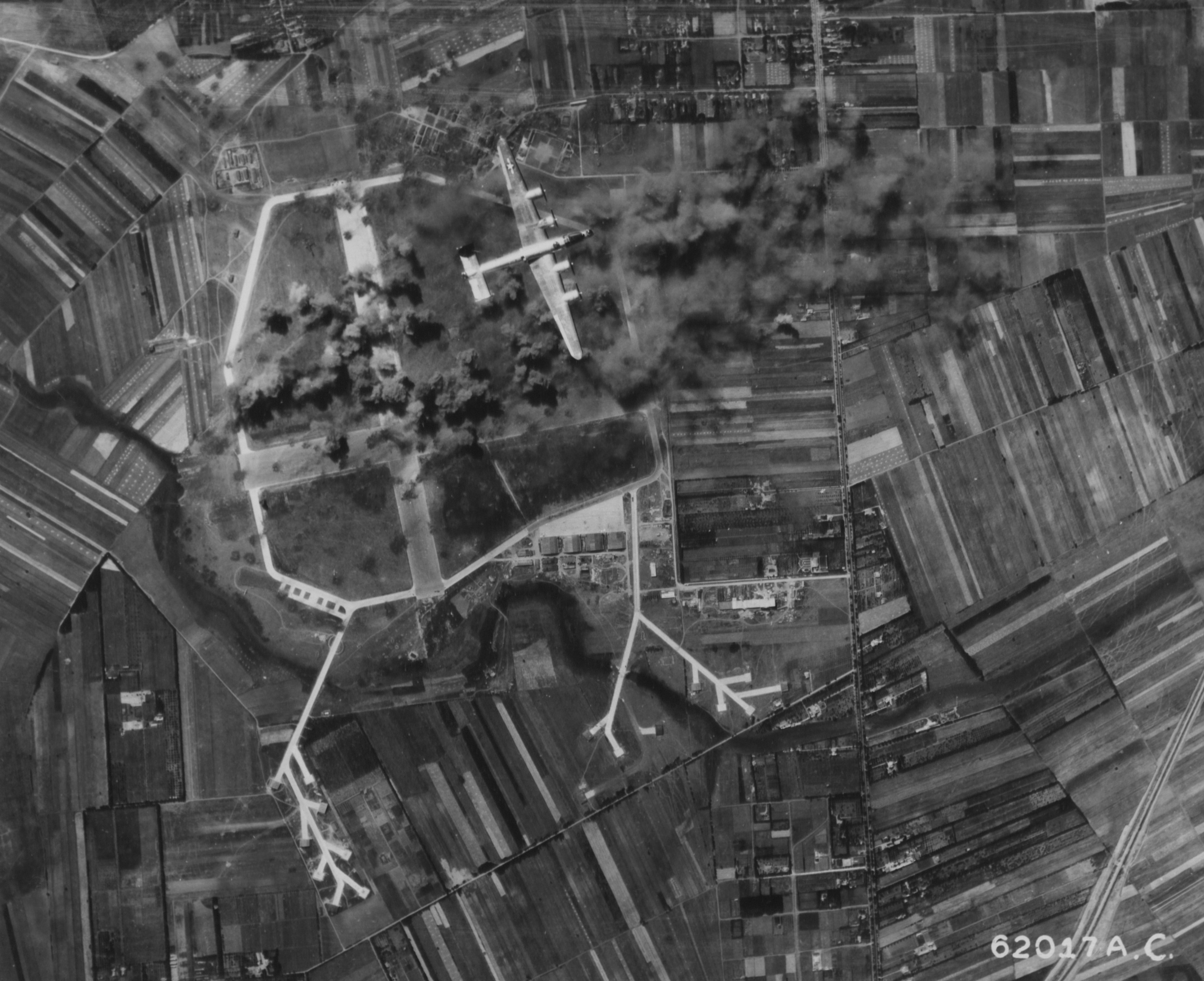
B-24 Liberators bombing the German-occupied Otopeni airport on 26 August 1944.

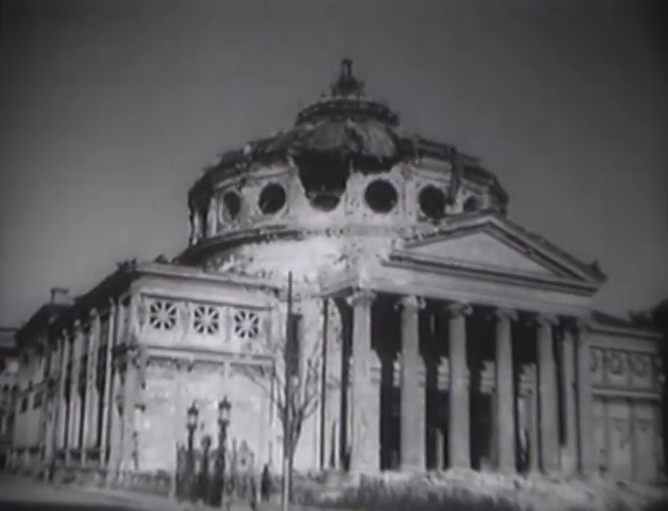
Damaged Romanian Athenaeum in the aftermath of the German air raids of 24–26 August 1944.

== See also ==
- Western Allied campaign in Romania
- Operation Margarethe II
- Operation Reunion

== Bibliography ==
- Mahoney, Kevin A. (2013). Fifteenth Air Force against the Axis: Combat Missions over Europe during World War II. Lanham, Maryland: Scarecrow Press. ISBN 9780810884953.
- Stout, Jay, A.C. (2011). Fortress Ploesti: The Campaign to destroy Hitler's oil. Havertown, PA.: Casemate. ISBN 978-1-935149-39-2.
