= Reiner Stahel =

German army general (1892-1955)

Rainer Stahel
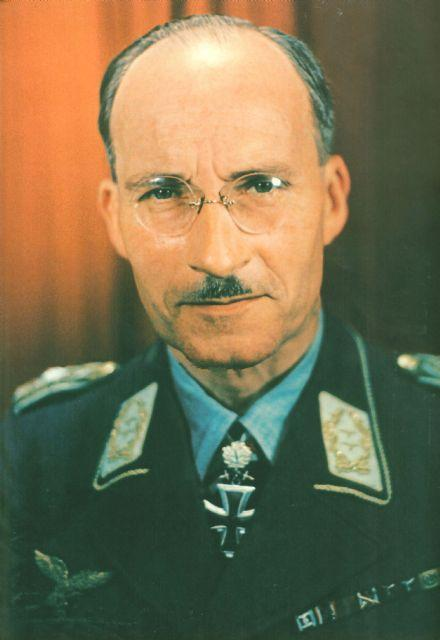
- Stahel in uniform
- Born: 15 January 1892; Bielefeld, German Empire
- Died: 30 November 1955 (aged 63); Ivanovo, Russian SFSR, Soviet Union
- Military career
- Allegiance: German Empire (1914–1918); Finland (1918–1933); Nazi Germany (1933–1945)
- Branch: Army
- Service years: 1911–1945
- Rank: Generalleutnant
- Commands: 22nd Flak Brigade
- Conflicts: World War I Finnish Civil War; World War II
- Awards: Knight's Cross of the Iron Cross with Oak Leaves and Swords

Rainer Joseph Karl August Stahel (sometimes wrongly written as Reiner; 15 January 1892 – 30 November 1955) was a German military officer and war criminal. He is best known for his retreat from Vilna and the command of the garrison of Warsaw during the Warsaw Uprising of 1944. Arrested by the NKVD in Romania, he spent the rest of his life in Soviet captivity.

== Early life ==
Stahel was born in Bielefeld. On 1 April 1911, he joined the 1. Lothringisches Infanterie-Regiment Nr. 130 of the Prussian Army.

== World War I ==
He fought with the German Army during World War I. By the end of the war, he had moved to Finland and joined the Finnish Army participating in the Finnish Civil War.

== Interwar ==
In 1933 he went to Nazi Germany where he worked at the Ministry of Aviation.

== World War II ==
Stahel participated in the German invasion of the Soviet Union as commander of Flakregiments 34 (June 1941), Flakregiment 99 (April 1942) and 4th Luftwaffe Field Division (September 1942). During the Battle of Stalingrad, Stahel conducted defensive actions at the head of Kampfgruppe Stahel. On 21 January 1943, he was promoted to major general and then transferred to Air Fleet 4.

At the end of May 1943, he was appointed commander of the new 22nd Flak Brigade in Italy and entrusted with protecting the Strait of Messina. Following the German retreat from Sicily and Italy's surrender, Stahel was made the military commander of Rome in September 1943.

=== 1944 ===
In July 1944, he commanded the Vilnius garrison in the Vilnius offensive and was able to postpone the seizure of that city by the Red Army. For his efforts, on 28 July 1944, he was awarded the Swords to the Knight's Cross and promoted to the rank of lieutenant general.

==== Warsaw uprising ====
Stahel was transferred to Warsaw, where he was to defend the city against the advancing Red Army. However, the Soviet offensive was halted. Instead, on August 1, the Warsaw Uprising was started by the Polish Home Army. On the uprising's first day, Stahel was surrounded in his headquarters in the Saxon Palace, and he lost control of the situation. On August 4, command over Nazi forces in Warsaw was given to Waffen-SS commander Erich von dem Bach-Zelewski and Stahel's pocket was subordinated to the new commander. By August 7, the Kampfgruppe Meyer, which was part of SS-Sonderregiment Dirlewanger reached Stahel's positions in the city centre, although he did not resume his command over the city's garrison.

===== Suppression of Warsaw uprising =====
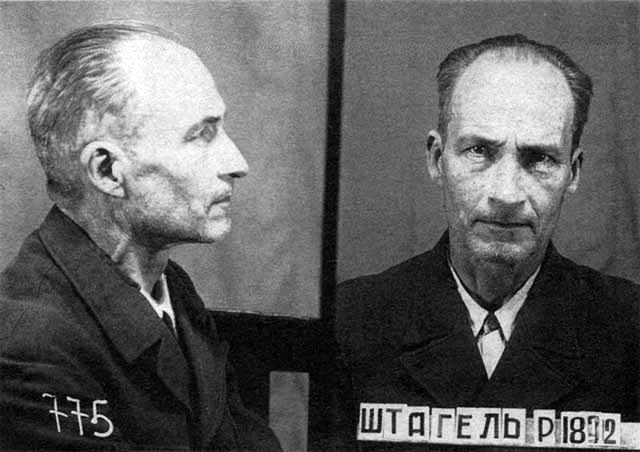
Rainer Stahel after arrest by NKVD 1944

Despite his relatively limited role in suppressing the Warsaw uprising of 1944, Stahel was responsible for a series of crimes committed against Warsaw's civilians. On August 2, he ordered the killing of all men identified as actual or potential insurgents and taking civilian hostages to be used as human shields when assaulting insurgent positions. Testimonies of the soldiers of the 562nd Grenadier Division's Grenadier Regiment East Prussia 4 who arrived in Warsaw on August 3 show that Stahel gave them the order to "kill all men encountered, remove women and children, and burn houses." Moreover, Stahel ordered the execution of Polish prisoners held in Mokotów prison and officially sanctioned looting, allowing German soldiers to take anything they wanted from houses on fire.

==== Romania ====
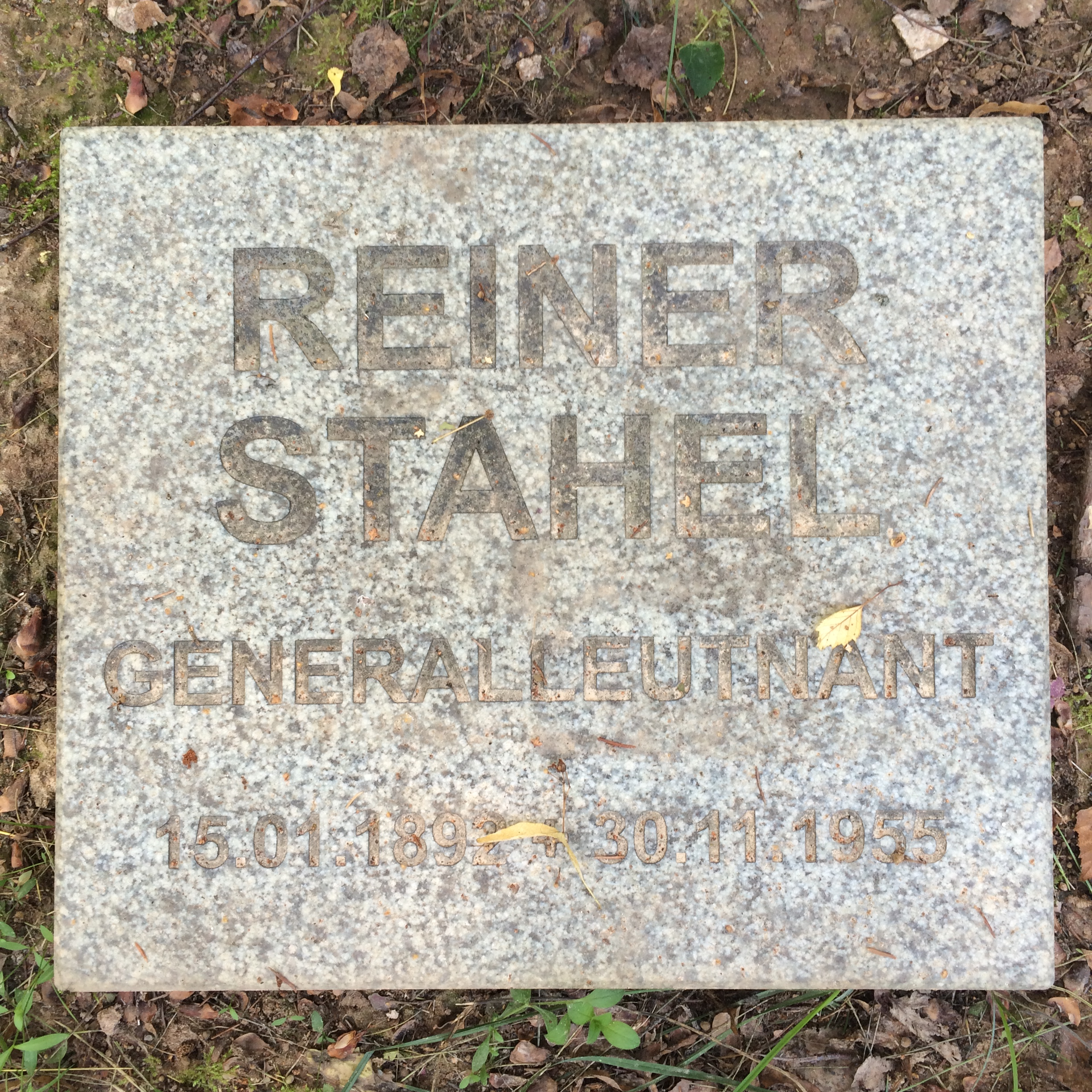
Grave in Cherntsy

On August 25, he was dispatched to Bucharest to replace General Alfred Gerstenberg, where the German headquarters anticipated similar urban warfare; his troops attempted to occupy Romania's capital Bucharest, but they were repulsed by troops loyal to King Michael I. On the same day, Romania declared war on the Axis. He was captured together with General Gerstenberg by Romanian soldiers at Gherghița on August 28. In the following days, the Red Army entered the city almost unopposed.

On 20 September 1944, Stahel was arrested by the NKVD together with Field Marshal Ion Antonescu. Interrogated on his part in the Warsaw Uprising, he was imprisoned in the Soviet Union. The exact date of his death is a subject of controversy.

== Death ==
According to initial Soviet sources, Stahel died on 30 November 1952 in Vladimir central transfer prison. However, recent sources confirm that Stahel died in 1955 in the Voikovo officer prison camp of a heart attack when he was informed of his possible transfer to Germany. This date is also confirmed by the gravestone in Russia (General Cemetery of the Chernzy/Cherntsy War Cemetery).

== Awards and decorations ==
- Iron Cross (1914), 2nd and 1st Class
  - 2nd Class on 12 October 1914
  - 1st Class on 24 March 1915
- Jäger Cross (Jägerkreuz) of the 27th Jäger Battalion (Finland)
- Order of the Cross of Liberty, 3rd and 2nd Class
  - 3rd Class on 8 May 1918
  - 2nd Class with Swords on 29 May 1918
- Finnish Commemorative Medal for the War of Freedom 1918 with battle clasp “Karjalan R.” (Vapaussodan – Karjalan rintama)
- Wound Badge (1918) in Black
- Bronze Cross for Merit of the Civil Guard (Cross of Merit of the Protection Corps; Suojeluskunta Rautainen ansioristi)
- The Honour Cross of the World War 1914/1918 with Swords
- Wehrmacht Long Service Award, 4th and 3rd Class
- Anschluss Medal on 11 February 1939
- War Merit Cross (1939), 2nd Class with Swords on 8 March 1941
- Repetition Clasp 1939 to the Iron Cross 1914, 2nd and 1st Class
  - 2nd Class on 10 July 1941
  - 1st Class on 19 September 1941
- Anti-Aircraft Flak Battle Badge
- Winter Battle in the East 1941–42 Medal
- Order of the White Rose of Finland, Commander's Cross
- Reference in the Wehrmachtbericht on 14 July 1944
- Knight's Cross of the Iron Cross with Oak Leaves and Swords
  - Knight's Cross on 18 January 1942 as Oberstleutnant and commander of Flak-Regiment 34.
  - Oak Leaves on 4 January 1943 as Oberst and commander of a Luftwaffe-Kampfgruppe "Stahel"
  - Swords on 18 July 1944 as Generalmajor and commander of Fester Platz Wilna
