= Alfred Gerstenberg =

German general (1893–1959)

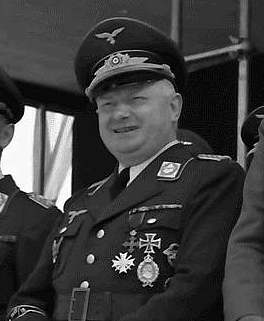
- Alfred Gerstenberg in Bucharest, May 1943
- Born: 6 April 1893; Grainau, German Empire
- Died: 1 January 1959 (aged 65); Bad Tölz, West Germany
- Military career
- Allegiance: German Empire (to 1918); Weimar Republic (to 1926); Nazi Germany
- Branch: Prussian Army (1912–1916); Luftstreitkräfte (1916–1918); Reichsheer (1918–1934); Luftwaffe (1934–1945)
- Service years: 1912–1926; 1934–1945
- Rank: Generalleutnant
- Conflicts: World War I World War II

Alfred Gerstenberg (6 April 1893, in Grainau – 1 January 1959, in Bad Tölz) was a general of the Nazi German Luftwaffe (air force) in World War II, serving as commanding general of the Luftwaffe mission to Romania, and organizing a very effective defensive perimeter around the oil fields in Ploiești.

== Career ==
Gerstenberg began his army service in 1912 in an Uhlan regiment. After a year of service, he graduated with the rank of Leutnant from the War School in Danzig. During World War I, in 1915, he was sent to the Eastern Front as part of a cavalry unit. Later, he was transferred to the air force and flew as an observation aircraft pilot. Both Gerstenberg and Manfred von Richthofen served in the same cavalry regiment and later in the same aviation unit, Kagohl 2. In 1917, he joined Jagdstaffel 11 led by von Richthofen, where he served until the end of the war; he did not shoot down any enemy aircraft. In October 1917, his plane was shot down and Gerstenberg suffered a severe injury from a bullet that hit him in one lung. Next year, he returned as a non-flying officer.

After the war he served in several cavalry units, retiring in 1926, then rejoining the Reichswehr aviation as a technical officer. While in the Reichswehr he was sent to the Soviet Union, where he oversaw the schools where German and Russian officers studied. Gerstenberg returned to Germany in January 1932, and commanded a cavalry regiment until 1934, when he was named chief of staff of the German Air Sports Association. As part of the Luftwaffe, he was tasked to write manuals for the aviation schools, while also assigned as an instructor at the Tutow Air War School.

In 1938, he was assigned by Hermann Göring as a Luftwaffe attaché to the embassy in Warsaw and the German Legation in Bucharest. His mission in Poland was to gather information on the Polish preparations to defend against an eventual German attack, while the mission in Romania was to "move the country away from British, American and French influence".

=== World War II ===
From 15 February 1942 to 28 August 1944, Gerstenberg served in the Deutsche Luftwaffenmission Rumänien, the Luftwaffe mission to Romania, whose government supported Germany, and later as commanding general of Luftwaffe in Romania (Kommandierender General und Befehlshaber der Deutschen Luftwaffe in Rumänien). He commanded around 25,000 men in Ploiești and 11,000 near Bucharest. His most important task was to set up a defense zone around the oil refineries in Ploiești, the largest single source of oil for Nazi Germany; he set up an effective anti-aircraft defense system against air attacks. As a result, the first massive air attack on the fields on 1 August 1943 (US Army Air Forces Operation Tidal Wave) failed to knock out oil production, suffering heavy losses.

In the night of 23/24 August, after King Michael's coup d'état against the Germany-supporting government, Gerstenberg together with General Erik Hansen and Ambassador Manfred von Killinger met up with General Constantin Sănătescu, the new Prime Minister of Romania. In the meeting, General Sănătescu offered the Germans safe passage to the Hungarian border, to which the German officials agreed. General Gerstenberg was to be escorted by Colonel Valeriu Selescu while passing through the capital on his way to Ploiești. However, once in Băneasa, Gerstenberg had the Romanian officer arrested. With orders received from Adolf Hitler, he then began to enact Operation Margarethe II, the plan to invade Romania in case the government surrendered to the Allies. With some 4,000 men under his command, Gerstenberg took over the airports of Băneasa and Otopeni, from where Luftwaffe aircraft began bombing Bucharest.

On 25 August, after Romania declared war on the Axis, he was replaced in command by Reiner Stahel. Brandenburger paratroopers were dropped in to support the German forces, but the planned invasion failed and the German troops were encircled. On 26 August, the German positions were bombed by the USAAF, and Romanian troops eventually occupied the airports. On 28 August, Gerstenberg and Stahel were arrested by Romanian soldiers at Gherghița. On 2 September 1944 Gerstenberg was taken by the Soviets to Moscow, and imprisoned in the Butyrka, Lefortovo and Vladimir prisons.

== After the war ==
Gerstenberg was sentenced to 25 years of prison by Soviet military tribunal in 1952, but released on 12 October 1955 and handed over to the authorities of the Federal Republic of Germany. He died of tuberculosis in Bad Tölz on 1 January 1959.

== Awards and decorations ==
- Iron Cross (1914)
  - 2nd Class
  - 1st Class
- Wound Badge in Black (1914)
- Knight's Cross of the Royal House Order of Hohenzollern with Swords
- Honour Cross of the World War 1914/1918
- Order of Aeronautical Virtue Commander class (4 November 1941)
- Order of Michael the Brave 3rd Class (3 March 1943)

== Bibliography ==
- Gerstenberg, Alfred (2019). Gerstenberg își amintește (in Romanian). Bragadiru: Miidecărți. ISBN 9786069049372.
- Hillgruber, Andreas (1965): Hitler, König Carol und Marschall Antonescu: die deutsch-rumänischen Beziehungen 1938–1944, Wiesbaden: Steiner.
- Kilduff, Peter (2007). Red Baron: The Life and Death of an Ace. David & Charles. ISBN 9780715328095.
