= Oil campaign chronology of World War II =

Timeline of Allied bombing campaign

The oil campaign chronology of World War II lists bombing missions and related events regarding the petroleum/oil/lubrication (POL) facilities that supplied Nazi Germany or those Germany tried to capture in Operation Edelweiss.

== Legend ==
— events regarding Nazi Germany petroleum, lubrication, and/or oil supplies
- events regarding notable Luftwaffe defensive efforts against Allied attack of petroleum, lubrication, and/or oil supply targets
and/or — events regarding Allied planning
— RAF, Eighth Air Force, and other roundels indicate units (most listings are from the RAF chronology and the USAAF chronology) "100 BG" — listings that include the unit abbreviation (BG is Bombardment Group) are from the corresponding mission history for the unit.

Chronology
| Date | Target/Topic | Event |
|---|---|---|
| May 15/16, 1940 | Oil and other installations in Ruhr | In response to the bombing of Rotterdam, Western Air Plan 5 was activated. This was the first large-scale strategic bombing during World War II and the first attack on the German interior - it inflicted little damage. Just 24 of 96 bombers dispatched to Ruhr Area power stations and refineries found the target area, setting several oil plants on fire. |
| May 16/17, 1940 | Oil installations in Ruhr | 6 Handley Page Hampden and 6 Vickers Wellington bombers attacked Ruhr oil targets. |
| May 17/18, 1940 | Hamburg-Harburg | 48 Hampdens attacked Hamburg oil installations. |
| May 17/18, 1940 | Bremen | 24 Armstrong Whitworth Whitley bombers attacked Bremen oil installations. |
| May 18/19, 1940 | "Oil refineries" | 24 Wellington, 24 Whitleys, and 12 Hampdens attacked oil refineries and railways in Germany and troops in Belgium. |
| May 22/23, 1940 | Leipzig/Leuna | 35 Hampdens were recalled due to bad weather, but one failed to receive the recall and bombed the Leuna oil refinery, 30 miles west of Leipzig. |
| May 27/28, 1940 | Bremen | Hampdens bombed oil refineries near Bremen. In the course of the raid, a tail gunner on a No. 10 Squadron RAF Whitley shot down the first German fighter by the RAF in World War II. |
| May 27/28, 1940 | Hamburg-Harburg refineries | Hampdens attacked oil refineries near Hamburg. |
| May 30/31, 1940 | Bremen | The Bremen oil refinery was bombed. |
| May 30/31, 1940 | Hamburg-Harburg refineries | Hamburg oil refineries were bombed. |
| June 2/3, 1940 | oil targets | 24 Whitleys and 6 Hampdens bombed "oil and communication targets in Germany". |
| June 4, 1940 | Frankfurt oil depot | The Frankfurt oil depot was attacked with 400 bombs. (Note: Frankfurt also had a Naxos Union grinding wheel plant.) |
| June 17/18, 1940 | Leipzig/Leuna | Leuna bombed. |
| September 4, 1940 | Chiefs of Staff | The Future Strategy report predicted "Germany's oil stocks might be exhausted--and Germany's situation disastrous--by June 1941." |
| September 14/15, 1940 | Antwerp | 43 Wellingtons bombed an oil depot near Antwerp. A Redeventza refinery was at Antwerp. |
| January 9/10, 1941 | Gelsenkirchen | Less than half of 135 aircraft dispatched bombed the Gelsenkirchen synthetic oil plants. |
| February 10/11, 1941 | Hanover | 222 aircraft (the highest number to one target) conducted the first "oil plant directive" mission on 17 oil production targets. |
| February 14/15, 1941 | Gelsenkirchen (Nordstern) | 9 Wellingtons bombed |
| February 28, 1941 | Romania | To enable bombing of "Roumanian oil installations", a British Expeditionary Force established a 'Balkan front'. |
| June 22, 1941 | Germany | The German invasion of the USSR included the goal to capture the Baku oilfields to increase their fuel reserves and their ability to retain lands captured in the war. |
| June 1941 | Ploiești | The Soviet Union's VVS bombed Ploiești. |
| July 14, 1941 | Ploiești | 6 VVS aircraft bombed Ploiești. |
| 1942 | Harnes | The Kuhlman Fischer-Tropsch plant at Harnes was shut down briefly due to bomb damage. |
| April 1942 | | After A-2 and the War Plans Division reported it as a target, Colonel Bonner Fellers identified Romanian oil was "by far the most decisive objective [and] the strategic target of the war". |
| May 30, 1942 | Cologne | The Kolnische Gummifaden Fabrik tire and tube factory at Deutz on the east bank of the Rhine was entirely destroyed. |
| 1942 | Ministry of Economic Warfare | The "Bombers' Baedeker" identified oil, communications, and ball bearings were "bottleneck" German industries. |
| June 12, 1942 | Ploiești (Astra Română) | The Halverson project raid from Egypt was the first US mission against a European target — 10 aircraft bombed the Astra Română oil refinery. |
| June 25/26, 1942 | Bremen | 1,067 aircraft attacking Bremen targets used Gee with limited success, damaging the oil refinery, Focke-Wulf buildings, the Atlas Werke, the Bremer Vulkan shipyard, the Norddeutsche Hütte AG steel mill, and 2 large dockside warehouses. |
| July 20, 1942 | | Hitler authorized Operation Edelweiss to capture the Soviet oil fields of Baku. On July 10, Hermann Göring had met with experts on how to repair the Russian Maykop oil facilities (Germany also reassembled an oil facility in Kherson, in Ukraine). The Soviets set the Maikop oilfields on fire on August 9, the town was evacuated on the 16th, and Nazi Germany began occupation in August. |
| September 1942 | Bucharest | The VVS bombed the oil installations. |
| September 1942 | Ploiești | The Soviet Union's VVS bombed the oil installations. |
| October 1942 | | The US "Enemy Oil Committee" was established as a counterpart to the British "Technical Sub-Committee on Axis Oil" (Hartley Committee). |
| November 1942 | Hartley Committee | The Axis Oil Position in Europe, November 1942 estimated that Romanian oil fields contribute 33% of Axis supplies. |
| December 3, 1942 | Joint Intelligence Subcommittee | The German Strategy in 1943 predicted Nazi Germany will have increased domestic oil supplies in mid-1943. |
| December 21, 1942 | Germany | A German armoured column within 30 miles of the Soviet Sixth Army near Stalingrad had to retreat due to having fuel for only 15 miles. At his HQ company Christmas party, Erwin Rommel received a miniature oil drum as a gift (containing captured British coffee). |
| January 16, 1943 | C/AS Management Control | After Hap Arnold created the United States Army Air Forces Committee for Operations Analysis (COA) on December 9, 1942, to develop a plan for strategic bombing, the COA's initial Western Axis Oil Industry report listed the following order of strategic importance: hydrogenation facilities (15 plants), refineries (29 plants), lubrication plants, coker units, Fischer-Tropsch facilities, tetraethyllead facilities, and oilfields/pipelines. |
| January 19, 1943 | | The Axis Oil Position (C.C.S. 158) at the Allied Casablanca Conference identified it would be "remote" for Nazi Germany to retain the Maikop oil fields. However, "even if the whole of the Romanian production were knocked out early in the year, [Germany] would still have enough for operations in 1944 [but the destruction of] two tetraethyllead factories… would hamstring the production of German aviation fuel" (Brehon Somervell). Nazi Germany destroyed the Maikop facilities prior to withdrawing. |
| January 21, 1943 | Combined Chiefs of Staff | C.C.S. 166/1/D identified oil facilities as the 4th bombing priority. |
| March 8, 1943 | C/AS Management Control | The COA's comprehensive plan identified the strategic bombing objective was to "bring about a high degree of destruction in a few really essential industries than to dissipate bombing efforts over a large number of targets [in] many industries." 19 vital industries were identified: Petroleum was 3rd (39 targets), "Synthetic rubber and rubber tires" were 6th (12 targets) and "Coking plants" were 10th (89 targets). In particular, destruction of 13 hydrogenation plants and 12 Ploesti refineries would reduce "German petroleum resources" by 90%. |
| April 10, 1943 | | "We must, therefore, apply [bombardment] to those specially selected and vital targets which will give the greatest return." (Arnold to Carl Spaatz) |
| April 20/21, 1943 | Pölitz | 339 bombers attacked the Stettin railyards, the Pölitz oil refinery, and Swinemünde. The Pölitz synthetic oil plant had been added to the Area Bombing Directive on February 14, 1942 (one day before it was issued), and a subcamp of Sachsenhausen near Pölitz provided forced labor. |
| May 19, 1943 | CCS | The CBO "Eaker" plan was approved and confirmed oil targets as the 4th primary objective ("contingent upon attacks against Ploesti"). |
| May 13/14; June 12/13, 1943 | Bochum benzene plant | Battle of the Ruhr bombings of the Bochum coal-producing center northwest of Essen damaged its "extensive coke, gas, benzol, and iron, and steel plants." In 1943, the 466th bombed Bochum targets on March 29, May 13, October 9, and November 4. After a 92 BG mission to Bochum on August 12, 1943, 342 RAF aircraft also accurately bombed Bochum on September 29/30, 1943 when the German radar controller mistakenly directed fighters to Bremen, 150 miles away. |
| May 16, 1943 | Ploiești | The Advisory Council submitted the Air Attack on Ploesti ("SOAPSUDS") bombardment plan, which the Trident Conference subsequently considered. On June 6 the plan was deemed "an important and desirable operation", and the "Planning committee" first met on June 25 (Uzal Girard Ent predicted losses of 75 aircraft). Training began on July 20/22 and ended July 29.< |
| June 22, 1943 | Hüls | In the first large-scale daylight raid on the Ruhr, 170 of 235 B-17s bombed the Hüls oil refinery and synthetic rubber plant. A Hüls target was also bombed on December 28/29, 1941. |
| June 23/24, 1943 | La Spezia | In the 2nd raid of Operation Bellicose, 52 bombers damaged an "oil depot" and an "armaments store". By March 1, 1944, the La Spezia crude oil refinery was "Unused". |
| June 25/26, 1943 | Bari | Wellingtons of the Northwest African Strategic Air Force bombed the "Bari, Italy oil refinery". |
| June 25/26, 1943 | Gelsenkirchen (Nordstern) | At the end of the first phase of the Combined Bomber Offensive, during the Battle of the Ruhr 473 aircraft unsuccessfully bombed Gelsenkirchen due to cloud and failure of Oboe equipment. |
| July 9/10, 1943 | Gelsenkirchen (Nordstern) | In one of the last large raids of the Battle of the Ruhr, 418 aircraft unsuccessfully - due to misplaced marking - attacked Gelsenkirchen. |
| August 1, 1943 | Brazi | Operation Tidal Wave bombed the Creditul Minier refinery in Brazi. |
| August 1, 1943 | Câmpina | Operation Tidal Wave bombed the Steaua Română refinery in Câmpina. |
| August 1, 1943 | Ploiești | Operation Tidal Wave bombed the Astra Română, Columbia Aquila, and Unirea Orion refineries at Ploiești (four Medals of Honor were awarded for the US Bomber pilots and four Order of Bravery to the Bulgarian fighter pilots to shoot them down) |
| August 1, 1943 | Ploiești | Operation Tidal Wave bombed the Astra Română and Concordia Vega refineries at Ploiești (one Medal of Honor was awarded). The Enemy Oil Committee subsequently appraised that Operation Tidal Wave bomb damage at Ploiești caused "no curtailment of overall product output". |
| August 12, 1943 | Bochum | Diverting from the Gelsenkirchen target, B-17 "Ain't It Gruesome" bombed Bochum. An unexploded 20 mm shell struck the boot of Captain Clark Gable, a gunnery observer on his third operational flight Gable's footage is in the FMPU's propaganda film Combat America. |
| August 12, 1943 | Recklinghausen | 183 B-17's are dispatched to synthetic oil installations at Bochum, Gelsenkirchen and Recklinghausen |
| August 12, 1943 | Gelsenkirchen | The 384 BG bombed the Gelsenkirchen "oil refinery". |
| November 5, 1943 | Gelsenkirchen | Mission 121: 229 of 323 B-17s bombed 495 tons on the marshalling yard and oil plants. |
| November 1943 | Gelsenkirchen (Scholven/Buer) | 96 of 328 B-17s bombed 238 tons on the "Hydrier Werke Scholven A.G." (damaged) and the Gelsenkirchener Bergwerke (missed). Gelsenkirchener Bergwerke plants were also at Duisburg-Hamborn (BRUCKHAUSEN Benzol Plant) and Dortmund. A Gelsenkirchen target was also attacked on November 19, and Gelsenkirchen Mission 134 on November 19 was rerouted to bomb the German-Dutch border due to malfunctioning blind-bombing PFF equipment in bad weather. |
| November 26, 1943 | Hartley Committee | "losses of oil stocks … caused by Allied attacks during the first eight months of 1943 [were] 400,000 tons. … Approximately 75 per cent of Roumanian crude is a waxy, viscous oil which becomes solid at temperatures below 69" degrees (J.I.C (43) 480). |
| December 30, 1943 | Ludwigshafen–Oppau | The 351 BG bombed the explosives factory at Oppau. Prior to May 1944, explosives production was 99,000 metric tons/month, but in December 1944, the amount had dropped to 20,500; and after October 1944, German explosives were 20% rock salt. The Mannheim-Ludwigshafen area was bombed in late 1943 to prevent recovery from previous bomb damage. The Mannheim aircraft plant was bombed on October 19, 1944, and Mannheim had a Daimler Benz truck plant. |
| January 7, 1944 | Ludwigshafen | 1,000 tons of bombs dropped on Ludwigshafen, and the 447 BG bombed the Ludwigshafen oil refinery. In addition to the nearby Oppau plants, Ludwigshafen targets included a small synthetic oil plant and an oil refinery that used the dehydrogenation process to improve "gasoline quality". Dr. Wurster of the Ludwigshafen Military Government was the "managing director of Oppau and Ludwigshafen." Ludwigshafen targets were subsequently bombed by the 8AF on March 2, March 31, and May 27. |
| January 12, 1944 | Fiume | The 317 BS bombed the oil refinery. Circa January 1944, the Enemy Oil Committee identified that Italian refining had ceased in August 1943. Italian refineries were at Fiume (Ramsa plant), La Spezia, Leghorn, Trieste (Aquila & SIAF plants), and Venice. |
| February 3, 1944 | | Budapest, Sofia, Bucharest, and Vienna were identified as second priority objectives for 15AF "area attack". |
| March 5, 1944 | Germany | "To reduce output … to virtually zero in the six months following 1 March requires the destruction of 23 synthetic plants (about 3.3 million tons) and 31 refineries (about 3.7 million tons) [which] currently account for over 90 per cent of total Axis refinery and synthetic oil output" (Plan for Completion of Combined Bomber Offensive). The "German oil situation is extremely vulnerable to the scale of attack contemplated, and that the results of any appreciable damage to production would be disastrous." (US Petroleum Attache, March 6). |
| March 25, 1944 | SHAEF | Although Spaatz's claimed "We believe attacks on transportation will not force the German fighters into action. We believe they will defend oil to their last fighter plane'', Dwight D. Eisenhower decided that "apart from the attack on the GAF,[German air force] the transportation plan was the only one which offered a reasonable chance of the air forces making an important contribution to the land battle during the first vital weeks of OVERLORD".^27.60 Control of all air operations was transferred to Eisenhower on April 14 at noon. |
| April 5, 1944 | Ploiești | 230 bombers bombed Ploiești for the 1st time in 8 months, beginning the "1944 Ploesti Campaign" (April 5-August 19: 5,674 sorties, 13,559 bomb tons, 254 aircraft lost). The 5th BW and 47th BW bombed the Ploeşti marshalling yards and adjacent oil facilities, and the 451 BG bombed the Ploiești oil refineries and marshalling yard (marshalling yards were next to an oil plant.) The Ploeşti marshalling yards were bombed on April 15 by the 15th AF and on April 24, by the 32nd BS, when the first use of the "Mickey" (H2X radar) was against Ploeşti. |
| April 19, 1944 | Germany | Bad winter weather had reduced Wehrmacht fuel consumption, and Luftwaffe fuel supplies were 574,000 tonnes. "Whereas in 1939 our hydrogenation plants were producing 2 million metric tons equivalent of petroleum (including automobile fuel), the construction of new facilities up to 1943 provided an increase to 5.7 million metric tons, and the facilities scheduled for this year will raise the yearly output to 7.1 million metric tons." (Albert Speer to Adolf Hitler). |
| April 24, 1944 | Ploiești | 34 B-24s of the 450 BG targeted the marshalling yards and bombed the "Vega Oil Refinery". |
| April 1944 | Salzbergen synthetic oil plant | The "Hydrierwerke Salzbergen" was attacked. |
| May 1, 1944 | United Kingdom | By May 1944, only 1.1% of Allied bombs had been used on oil targets. |
| May 5, 1944 | Ploiești | The marshalling yards and oil refineries were bombed. B-24s also bombed the Braşov^{450 BG} & Ploiești marshalling yards on May 6. |
| May 9, 1944 | Bruges, Belgium | 12 Bostons achieved near misses at an oil depot at Bruges. |
| May 12, 1944 | Leipzig/Böhlen | Mission 353 was the 1st trial raid on oil targets to test the claim that the Luftwaffe would defend oil targets in Germany more than they had defended transportation targets. RLV fighters put up their largest force ever, but five synthetic oil plants were successfully attacked with 1,718 tons of bombs. A diversionary raid made on the Zwickau aircraft depot faced 200 Luftwaffe fighters |
| May 12, 1944 | Merseburg | Mission 353: The 384 BG bombed Merseburg. |
| May 12, 1944 | Lützkendorf | Mission 353: 87 planes hit oil facilities at Lützkendorf near Leipzig, which had a small Wintershall crude oil refinery (100,000 tons/yr), a hydrogenation unit for blending gasolines, and a Fischer-Tropsch plant to process heavier gasoline cuts from synthesized oil. Plants were at "Lützkendorf" and "Lützkendorf-Mücheln" [sic]. |
| May 12, 1944 | Zeitz | Mission 353 |
| May 12, 1944 | Brüx, Czechoslovakia | Mission 353 bombed Brüx. On December 15, 1942, Sudetenländische Treibstoffwerke AG (STW) had begun output of synthesized fuel from brown coal (German: braunkohle) at the Maltheuren plant at Brüx. |
| May 13, 1944 | Bad Zwischenahn, Germany | First combat test flights of the Messerschmitt Me 163B rocket-powered interceptor fighter by Erprobungskommando 16, intended for defense of petroleum/oil/lubricants industry targets. |
| May 18, 1944 | Ploiești (Concordia Vega) | The 464 BG bombed the Concordia Vega refinery. |
| May 19, 1944 | Germany | Daily output of aircraft fuel had dropped from 5,850 to 4,820 metric tonnes; but the reserve of 574,000 tonnes was expected to last 19 months. On "'May 12 ... the technological war was decided. ...with the attack ... upon several fuel plants ... a new era in the air war began. It meant the end of German armaments production" (Speer). "In my view the fuel, Buna rubber, and nitrogen plants represent a particularly sensitive point for the conduct of the war, since vital materials for armaments are being manufactured in a small number of plants… The enemy has struck us at one of our weakest points. If they persist at it this time, we will soon no longer have any fuel production worth mentioning" (Hitler). By May 28, fuel production had returned to the level prior to the May 12 raids. The "economic air raids [using] wise planning [by] the enemy began ... in the last half or three-quarters of a year" before December 1944. "Before that he was, at least from his standpoint, committing absurdities" (Speer, December 1, 1944) |
| May 26, 1944 | Ploiești (Româno-Americană) | The No. 205 Group RAF bombed the Româno-Americană refinery. |
| May 28, 1944 | Leipzig/Leuna | Mission 376 dispatched a record force of 1,282 bombers against plants and refineries, losing 50 including 400 in the 2nd trial attack of oil targets. 63 B-24s bombed Merseburg/Leuna, and Leuna resumed partial production on June 3 and reached 75% of capacity in early July. |
| May 28, 1944 | Lützkendorf | The 486 BG again bombed Lützkendorf. |
| May 28, 1944 | Magdeburg/Königsberg, Bavaria | Mission 376: 105 B-17s bombed an oil dump at Königsburg/Magdeburg. A Königsberg target was also bombed on June 20 (Mission 425), and Magdeburg also had a Junkers Jumo 211 engine plant (the 487 BG bombed the Magdeburg airplane factory on August 5, 1944.) |
| May 28, 1944 | Magdeburg/Rothensee | Mission 376: 55 B-17s bombed oil industry at Magdeburg/Rothensee. Bohlen-Rotha, Magdeburg-Rothensee, Ruhland-Scwarzheide (a 1937 Fischer-Tropsch plant), & Zeitz-Troglitz were the 4 plants (3 were for Bergius hydrogenation) of Braunkohlen Benzin AG (Brabag), which was formed on October 26, 1934. The Brabag subsidiary of Gesellschaft für Mineralölbau GmbH (established November 1936) designed the plants based on licensed information from other oil companies. |
| May 28, 1944 | Ruhland–Schwarzheide | Mission 376: 38 B-17s bombed an oil target at Ruhland/Schwarz-Heide. |
| May 28, 1944 | Zeitz | Mission 376: 187 B-24s bombed "Zeitz-Tröglitz". KZ Tröglitz was a subcamp of Buchenwald |
| May 29, 1944 | Pölitz | Mission 379: 224 B-24s bombed an oil terminal at Pölitz. "Poelitz/Stettin" was a synthetic plant, and on May 13, clouds had forced 272 B-17s (Mission 355) dispatched to oil targets in W Poland to bomb Stettin (Polish: Szczecin) and Stralsund. |
| May 28/29, 1944 | Ploiești | Ploiești was bombed. |
| May 31, 1944 | Ludwigshafen | The 447 BG bombed the oil refinery. |
| May 31, 1944 | Romania | The 485 BG bombed the Redeventa [sic] Refinery. "Lumina Petromina" was an additional Romanian refinery not in Ploiești or Bucharest. |
| May 31, 1944 | | The intelligence annex to the field order for the May 31 Ploiești mission stated "Successful attacks on [the aircraft factories at the] Wiener-Neustadter complex have raised oil to high priority. …destruction of remaining active capacity of Ploesti will create [a] critical situation for [the] entire Axis war effort and make possible further important inroads through attacks in Austria, Hungary, Yugoslavia and Italy. [The] Eighth Air Force has now damaged all but 2 of the major synthetic plants in its area making it possible for Fifteenth [Air Force] to destroy sufficient refinery and synthetic capacity to [reduce total] production close to 75 percent. Destruction of vital installations in targets selected will immobilize Ploesti capacity for several months." |
| May 31, 1944 | Ploiești | 32 B-24s of the 450 BG attacked the "Româno-Americană Oil Refinery", but failed due to the smoke screens. The 450 BG also bombed the Româno-Americană refinery on June 6, 24, & July 15; and the Concordia Vega refinery on July 9, 22 |
| June 5, 1944 | Germany | A May 5 decoded message stated anti-aircraft artillery was being moved to Pölitz and Blechhammer, and one on June 5 indicated the Luftwaffe was short of fuel. British intelligence concluded that the bombing of oil targets would be "crippling" in 3–6 months. Romanian production had been reduced from 200,000 tons in February to 40,000 in June. |
| June 6, 1944 | | Spaatz ordered that "the primary aim of the Eighth and Fifteenth Air Forces would be to deny oil to the enemy". |
| June 6, 1944 | Ploiești (Dacia Română-485 BG, Româno-Americană-450 BG) | In the 1st large-scale American attempt to use a dispersed bomber force to spread out fighter defenses in Romania, Ploiești was bombed (the 485 BG bombed the Dacia Română oil refinery). Additional B-17s, including some Soviet-based for Operation Frantic, attacked the Galați Airdrome: "most oil from Ploesti must be shipped west over [the] Danube for refining." (annex of intelligence report) |
| June 9 & 10, 1944 | Porto Marghera | Porto Marghera oil storage bombed. |
| June 10, 1944 | Trieste | B-24s bombed an oil refinery at Trieste. |
| June 10, 1944 | Ploiești | 36 P-38s dive-bombed 3 Ploiești oil refineries by flying under the smoke screens. |
| June 11, 1944 | Constanța | B-24s bombed an oil installation at Constanța. |
| June 11, 1944 | Giurgiu | The 461 BG bombed the Giurgiu oil storage. 80 miles southeast of Ploiești, Giurgiu was "the most important transshipment point in Europe". |
| June 11, 1944 | Smederevo | The 485 BG bombed the "Smedervo" [sic] oil refinery. |
| June 12/13, 1944 | Gelsenkirchen (Nordstern) | The 1st RAF oil target bombing following the June 3 British Air Staff request for RAF Bomber Command to attack Ruhr oil plants halted Nordstern production (1,000 tons/day of aviation fuel) for several weeks. THe main attack of the night was directed against lines of communication targets in France. |
| June 13, 1944 | Porto Marghera | The 461 BG targeted the Porto Marghera oil storage and hit the aluminum plant. |
| June 14, 1944 | Emmerich am Rhein | Mission 412: 61 B-24s hit the Emmerich, Germany oil refinery. Deutsche Gasolin plants were at Emmerich, Dollbergen, and Korneuburg. |
| June 14, 1944 | Pétfürdő | The 464 BG bombed the Pétfürdő oil cracking plant. The 32 BS bombed a Budapest oil refinery. |
| June 14, 1944 | ^{[Expand]} | B-24s bomb oil targets Komárom (Hungary), and Osijek (Ipoil). |
| June 14, 1944 | Caprag | B-24s bombed oil target[s] at Sisak-Caprag. Caprag refining capacity was 120,000 tons/yr. |
| June 14, 1944 | Pardubice region | B-24s bombed an oil target at Pardubice. |
| June 14, 1944 | Osijek | 39 B-24s of the 450 BG targeted the oil refinery. |
| June 14/15, 1944 | Gelsenkirchen (Scholven/Buer) | 3 bombs from 35 Mosquitoes fell into the plant area, and 3 civilians were killed outside the factory—a farmer, a lorry-driver, and a housewife. |
| June 15, 1944 | Hanover (Deurag-Nerag) | Mission 414: 172 B-17s hit the Hanover/Misburg oil refinery, to which the Hanover-Misburg subcamp of Neuengamme provided forced labor. The Misburg refinery (1,060 workers) was 5 miles East of Hanover, and a decoy plant was about 2 miles from the refinery. Hanover also had three tire plants: Vahrenwalderstrasse, Nordhafen, and Marienwerder (a rubber factory in Hanover was bombed on July 26, 1943, during Blitz Week). |
| June 16, 1944 | Vienna/Floridsdorf | B-17s bombed the Floridsdorf [sic] oil refinery. On this date the 464 BG bombed an oil blending plant at Vienna. Vienna was first bombed on March 17, 1944. |
| June 16, 1944 | Kagran | B-17s bombed the Kragan [sic] oil refinery |
| June 16, 1944 | Vienna (Lobau) | B-24s bombed the Lobau oil refinery west of Vienna. |
| June 16, 1944 | Vienna Schwechat | B-24s bombed the oil refinery at Schwechat in Vienna. Schwechat also had an aircraft factory that was bombed on June 26, 1944; and became a separate city in 1954. |
| June 16, 1944 | Vienna | B-24s bombed the Winterhafen oil depot. |
| June 16, 1944 | Bratislava (Apollo) | 38 B-24s of the 450 BG targeted the Apollo oil refinery. |
| June 16, 1944 | Szőny | The 461 BG bombed the "oil storage installations" and earned a commendation from the 49th Bomb Wing commander (Lee). |
| June 16, 1944 | Vienna (Schwechat) | The oil refinery and the Heinkel-Süd aircraft factory were bombed. |
| June 16, 1944 | Vienna (Winterhafen) | Winterhafen oil refinery bombed. |
| June 17, 1944 | France | B-26s attacked French fuel dumps. |
| June 17/18, 1944 | Gelsenkirchen (Scholven/Buer) | With most of the effort on railways, four Mosquitoes targeted the Scholven/Buer oil plant |
| June 18, 1944 | Bremen | The Bremen-Oslebshausen refinery was 1 of 11 locations bombed on this date. Bremen Oslebshausen refining capacity was 100,000 tons/yr. |
| June 18, 1944 | Hamburg-Harburg refineries | Mission 421: B-17s bombed Hamburg-Ebano (18), Hamburg-Eurotank (54), Hamburg-Ossag (38), and Hamburg-Schindler (36). The Ostermoor refinery was also at Hamburg. |
| June 18, 1944 | Hanover (Deurag-Nerag) | Mission 421: 88 B-17s bombed the Hanover-Misburg oil refinery. |
| June 18 & 23, 1944 | Giurgiu | The 485 BG bombed the oil installations at Giurgiu. |
| June 19, 1944 | Sète | The 485 BG bombed the oil refinery. The Frontignan refinery was at Sète, and other small French refineries were at Gonfreville, Port Jerome, Martiques, Petit-Couronne, Etang de Berre, Dunkirk, L'Avere, Bec d'Ambès, Courchalettes, Gravenchon, 2 plants at Donges, and a shale oil refinery was at Autun. |
| June 20 & 25, 1944 | Balaruc-le-Vieux | The 464 BG bombed oil refineries at "Balaruc". A Balaruc-le-Vieux target was bombed on the 25th. |
| June 20, 1944 | Hanover (Deurag-Nerag) | Mission 425: 169 B-24s bombed the Deurag-Nerag crude oil refinery. |
| June 20, 1944 | Hamburg-Harburg refineries | Mission 425: B-17s bombed oil refineries at Hamburg/Deut.Petr.AG (53), Harburg/Ebano (60), Hamburg/Eurotank (107), Hamburg/Rhenania-Ossag (50), Harburg/Rhenania (53), Hamburg/Schliemanns (54), and Hamburg/Schindler (26). |
| June 20, 1944 | Magdeburg/Rothensee | Mission 425: 95 B-17s bombed Magdeburg/Rothensee. |
| June 20, 1944 | Pölitz | 245 B-24s bombed. |
| June 21, 1944 | Germany | The minimum number of flak guns were ordered to be placed at Pölitz (200), Auschwitz (200), Hamburg (200), Brüx (170, Gelsenkirchen (140), Scholven (140), Wesseling (150), Heydebreck (130), Leuna (120), Blechhammer (100), Moosbierbaum (100), and Böhlen (70). The Ruhland Fischer-Tropsch plant and other synthetic oil plants were fortified to be "hydrogenation fortresses" (e.g., the plants in the Leipzig area were protected by over 1,000 guns.) In addition to increased active defenses, the facilities (German: hydrierfestungen) incorporated blast walls and concrete "dog houses" around vital machinery. 7,000 engineers were released from the German Army to provide technical support for oil facilities. Aviation fuel production (thousands of tons) was reduced the most in June 1944 (Wolfgang Birkenfeld, 1964): |
| June 21, 1944 | Ruhland-Schwarzheide | Mission 428: 123 B-17s bombed the Ruhland synthetic-oil plant south of Berlin en route to Ukraine. That night, Luftwaffe bombers diverted to the Ukrainian base from a route to a nearby railroad target and dropped 110 tons of bombs, destroying or damaging 69 of 114 B-17s at Poltava, along with 200,000 gallons of aviation fuel plus 253 gallons of aviation oil. |
| June 21/22, 1944 | Wesseling | 128 Lancasters, 6 Mosquitoes, and 5 Lancasters attacked the Wesseling synthetic-oil plant in 10/10ths low cloud using H2S radar (production loss was 40%). Chemische Fabrik Wesseling AG operated a Wesseling facility, and to replace Wesseling, in April 1944 a "large underground plant for synthetic oil manufactured from brown coal was started outside Bergheim". Wesseling also had a Deutsche Norton grinding wheel plant. |
| June 21/22, 1944 | Gelsenkirchen (Scholven/Buer) | 123 Lancasters and 9 Mosquitoes attacked the synthetic-oil plant through cloud using Oboe skymarking and caused a loss of 20% production. |
| June 22, 1944 | (Gennevilliers | The Standard Oil Gennevilliers plant, capable of producing 2,200 metric tonnes per month, was bombed. |
| June 22, 1944 | Paris | Mission 432: 101 B-24s hit an oil dump at Paris. |
| June 22, 1944 | (Rouen | Mission 432: 33 B-17s hit the Rouen oil depot. |
| June 22, 1944 | | B-26s attacked fuel dumps. |
| June 22, 1944 | Germany | In July, Hitler promised to have "hydrogenation plants protected by fighter planes",<!-Speer p482 of hardcopy--> and in August, a limited program was assigned the "highest priority". "By sending the production of fighter aircraft soaring we can meet the greatest danger we face: the crushing of our armaments manufacture on the home front" (Speer, August 13).<!-Speer p485 of hardcopy--> |
| June 23, 1944 | (Giurgiu) | B-24s bombed Giurgiu oil storage. |
| June 23, 1944 | Ploiești | The 32 BS bombed a Ploiești oil refinery. |
| June 24, 1944 | Ploiești | B-24s bombed an oil refinery. |
| June 24, 1944 | Bremen | Mission 438: 213 B-17s bombed Bremen oil industry. The 92 BG bombed the Bremen "oil storage complex". |
| June 25, 1944 | Montbartier | Mission 441: 64 B-17s hit the Montbartier oil depot. |
| June 25, 1944 | Sète | The 32 BS bombed Sète oil storage. |
| June 25, 1944 | | 400+ B-26s and A-20s hit French fuel dumps at Foret d'Andaine, Foret d'Ecouves, and Senonches. |
| June 25/26, 1944 | Homberg | 42 Mosquitoes bombed the Treibstoffwerke Rheinpreußen synthetic-oil plant at Homberg/Meerbeck in the Ruhr. |
| June 26, 1944 | Vienna (Schwechat) | The Schwechat aircraft factory (Heinkel-Sud) and oil refinery were bombed. |
| June 26, 1944 | Drohobycz | Mission 442: After being delayed one day due to weather, 72 B-17s left Poltava and Mirgorod, USSR, joined with 55 P-51s from Pyriatyn to bomb the marshalling yard and oil refinery at Drohobycz. Fifteenth Air Force P-51s met the formation 1 hour after the attack and escorted the B-17s to Foggia Italy; the B-17s were planned to transfer to UK bases on June 27 but bad weather delayed the move until July 5. |
| June 26, 1944 | Vienna (Floridsdorf) | The Floridsdorf oil refinery and marshalling yard were bombed. |
| June 26, 1944 | Korneuburg | The 461 BG bombed "a refinery in the open country near the small town of Korneuburg". |
| June 26, 1944 | Vienna (Moosbierbaum) | The 455th BG received a 2nd Distinguished Unit Citation for bombing the Vienna (Moosbierbaum) oil refinery. |
| June 26, 1944 | Vienna (Lobau) | The Lobau oil refinery was bombed. |
| June 1944 | Heydebreck | The Heydebreck oil/chemical facilities near Cosel and Blechhammer were first bombed in June 1944. |
| June 27, 1944 | Blechhammer South | The 464 BG bombed the Blechhammer South synthetic oil plant. |
| June 27, 1944 | Drohobycz | B-24s bombed oil industry. The Drohobycz (Nafta) refinery produced 35,000 tons/year. |
| June 28, 1944 | Paris/Dugny | Mission 445: 18 B-17s hit the Dugny oil depot. |
| June 28, 1944 | Bucharest | In Bucharest, where much of Ploiești's refined product was stored and distributed, the 464 BG bombed the "Prohava [sic] Petrolul" refinery and the 485 BG bombed the "Titan Oil Refinery". |
| June 28/29, 1944 | Gelsenkirchen (Scholven/Buer) | 33 Mosquitoes bombed Saarbrücken (which had an airfield and marshalling yards) and 10 bombed the Scholven/Buer oil plant. |
| June 29, 1944 | Leipzig/Böhlen | Mission 447: 81 B-17s bombed the Böhlen synthetic oil plant. |
| June 30, 1944 | Blechhammer North & South | The 461 BG & 464 BG bombed the South plant, and the 32 BS bombed the North plant. |
| June 30, 1944 | Germany | "Our aviation gasoline production was badly hit in May and June. The enemy has succeeded in increasing our losses of aviation gasoline up to 90 percent by June 22. Only through speedy recovery of damaged plants has it been possible to regain partly … however, aviation gasoline production is completely insufficient … If we cannot manage to protect our hydrogenation factories and our refineries by all possible means, it will be impossible to get them back into working order from the state they are in now. If that happens, then by September we shall no longer be capable of covering the Wehrmacht's most urgent needs. In other words, from then on there will be a gap which will be impossible to fill and which will bring in its train inevitable tragic consequences." (Speer to Hitler) |
| June 30/July 1, 1944 | Homberg | 40 Mosquitoes to Homberg oil plant. |
| July 2, 1944 | Budapest (Shell) | The 456 BG bombed the "previously-untouched" Shell Oil refinery at Budapest and earned its 2nd Distinguished Unit Citation. 31 aircraft bombed at mid-morning and were attacked three minutes after bomb release by 50 Bf 109s and 10 FW-190s of Jagdgeschwader 300 and the Hungarian 101 Puma Group. The 744 BS lost 6 of 9 bombers in the target area and a seventh damaged beyond repair (36 KIA/MIA, 24 captured — the largest single-day loss for the group.) Budapest's three refineries were operated by Shell, Magyar Petrol, and Asvanyol-Fanto, and oil storage was at Budapest-Csepel. Budapest also was the site of the Duna Repülőgépgyár Szigentmiklos assembly plant for Messerschmitt Me 210s and 410s. |
| July 3, 1944 | Belgrade | The 464 BG bombed the Shell oil depot at Belgrade. |
| July 3, 1944 | Braşov | The 32 BS bombed the Photogen oil refinery (formerly the Petroleum Refinery Transylvania). |
| June 11 & July 13, 1944 | (Porto Marghera) | The 485 BG bombed the "Marghera Oil Storage" near Mestre. |
| July 6, 1944 | (Porto Marghera) | The 464 BG bombed the oil storage at Porto Marghera. |
| July 6, 1944 | Ploiești | The 461st BG bombed Ploiești oil targets. |
| July 7, 1944 | United Kingdom | The Joint Oil Targets Committee was set up. |
| July 7, 1944 | Blechhammer North & South | 365 bombers attacked the North and South plants. |
| July 7, 1944 | Leipzig | Of 453 B-17s, 114 bombed Leipzig/Taucha, 35 hit Leipzig/Heiterblick, 79 & 15 bombed the Erla fighter aircraft plants at Leipzig/Mockau & Leipzig/Abtnaundorf, 46 hit Leipzig Deutsche Kugellager Fabrik (D.K.F.) ball bearing works. (The Leipzig DKF plant was also bombed on December 3/4, 1943.) 35 hit Kolleda Airfield, 19 hit Leipzig Station and 7 hit Nordhausen. Leipzig/Taucha had an oil refinery and a Mittledeutsche Jumo 211 engine plant. In March 1944, the Leipzig A.T.G. plant could complete final assembly of Ju 88 bombers at 10/month. |
| July 7, 1944 | Leipzig/Böhlen | 64 B-17s, out of a 303-bomber force of Flying Fortresses hit the Böhlen oil plant. |
| July 7, 1944 | Leipzig/Leuna | The 447 BG bombed Merseburg, and Leuna was shut down for 2 days. By July 19 production had risen to 53% of capacity. |
| July 7, 1944 | Leipzig/Lützkendorf | 102 B-24s, out of a 373-bomber force of Liberators hit the Lützkendorf oil plant. |
| July 8, 1944 | Vienna (Floridsdorf) | The 464 BG and 465 BG earned Distinguished Unit Citations, as the Heinkel-Süd plant in Floridsdorf was hit, destroying the third prototype of the He 177B four engined bomber, and possibly damaging the incomplete fourth prototype He 177B airframe. |
| July 9, 1944 | Ploiești | B-24s bombed an oil refinery. |
| July 11, 1944 | (Porto Marghera) | The 464 BG bombed the oil storage at Porto Marghera. |
| July 14, 1944 | Budapest | The 32 BS bombed a Budapest oil refinery |
| July 14, 1944 | Budapest | 26 B-24s of the 450 BG targeted the Ferencvaros marshalling yard and hit buildings, a factory, and a refinery. |
| July 15, 1944 | Ploiești (Unirea Speranţa) | 600+ B-17s and B-24s bombed 4 oil refineries in the Ploiești area and the "Teleajenul pumping station". The 485 BG bombed the Sperantza [sic] Oil Refinery. |
| July 16, 1944 | Vienna | The 32 BS bombed a Vienna oil refinery. |
| July 17, 1944 | Germany | Aviation fuel production was 2,307 daily tonnes (40% of original production). |
| July 18, 1944 | Kiel | The 447 BG bombed Kiel oil targets. During the September 12 major assault on the German oil industry (Mission 626), 58 B-24s also bombed a Kiel target. |
| July 18, 1944 | Friedrichshafen | The 464 BG bombed the synthetic fuel plant at Oberaderach. |
| July 18/19, 1944 | Gelsenkirchen (Scholven/Buer) | 157 bombers attacked. The raid "achieved complete surprise through radio silence" and caused production to come to "a complete standstill for a long period". |
| July 18/19, 1944 | Wesseling | 188 heavy bombers. The bombing destroyed 20% of the installations. |
| July 20, 1944 | Leipzig/Leuna | The 447 BG bombed the Merseburg "synthetic oil refinery". |
| July 20/21, 1944 | Bottrop-Welheim | 166 bombers attacked the Ruhröl AG synthetic oil plant. |
| July 20/21, 1944 | Homberg | 147 Lancasters attacked and caused severe damage |
| July 21, 1944 | Brüx | The 32 BS bombed. |
| July 22 & 28, 1944 | Ploiești (Româno-Americană) | The 464 BG bombed the Româno-Americană refinery. |
| July 23, 1944 | Berat | 14 B-24s of the 450 BG targeted the "Kucove Oil Refinery" and previous bombing obscured the aiming point (there were "near misses" on the "old refinery"). |
| July 23, 1944 | Donges, France | 119 aircraft attacked an oil refinery and storage depot at the start of a new campaign "against oil targets in the occupied Countries." |
| July 25/26, 1944 | Wanne-Eickel | 135 bombers attacked the Krupp GmbH synthetic oil plant. |
| July 28, 1944 | Leipzig/Leuna | Over Merseburg, the 92 BG bombed the synthetic oil refinery/storage, and the Me 163B Komet rocket fighters of I.Gruppe/JG 400 conducted its first point-defense attacks from its nearby field at Brandis, engaging B-17s with escorts, including 8 P-51s of the 359th Fighter Group. Merseburg-Leuna was bombed 6 times from July 20-September 28. Leuna attacks on July 28 & 29; August 24; September 11, 13, & 28; and October 7 kept Leuna closed until October 14. |
| July 28, 1944 | Ploiești (Româno-Americană, Standard Petrol Block) | The 464 BG bombed the Româno-Americană refinery and the 485 BG bombed the "Standard Oil Refinery" (B-24 44-40497 was abandoned after flying into the fireball of 41-29275). |
| July 29, 1944 | Leipzig/Leuna | The 384 BG bombed Merseburg. |
| July 31, 1944 | Germany | Luftwaffe fuel supplies were 35,000 tonnes in July. By July 21, Production was reduced to 120 daily tonnes, but was restored to 690 by the end of July. However, repairs were not as durable and shocks from near misses caused leaks (from August to October, monthly production was 10% or less of original rates, then reached 28% in November.) |
| July 31, 1944 | Bucharest | Two oil refineries at Bucharest, one at Doicești, and oil storage at Targoviste were bombed. |
| July 1944 | Ploiești | The 461st BG received a 2nd Distinguished Unit Citation for a July 1944 Ploiești bombing. |
| July 31, 1944 | Ploiești (Xenia) | The 461 BG bombed the Ploiești Xenia oil refinery. |
| August 2, 1944 | ^{[Expand]} | Mission 510: Paris/Gennevilliers (51 B-17s), Paris/Dugny (38 B-17s), and Sens (26 B-24s) bombed. Fifteenth Air Force B-17s hit Le Pouzin (461st BG) and Le Pontet oil storage facilities. The 447 BG bombed the St Dennis "oil and supply dump". |
| August 3, 1944 | Friedrichshafen | The 461 BG's primary target was the "Raderach Chemical Works", and the ZF Friedrichshafen "Zahnradfabrik" (English: gearwheel factory for vehicle transmissions) secondary target was also bombed. The chief tank factories were at Maybach, Nordbau (Frankfurt), and Zahnradfabrik, and nearly all tank engines were produced at either the Maybach Motorenbau at Friedrichshafen and Norddeutsche Motorenbau at Berlin. |
| August 3, 1944 | | Mission 513: 62 B-24s bombed Brussels/Vilvoorde oil installations/dumps. The Ghent, Langerbrugge (Shell) plant was in Belgium. |
| August 3, 1944 | Merkwiller-Pechelbronn | Mission 512: 106 B-17s hit the Merkwille [sic] Oil Refinery. "Merkwiller, Pechelbronn, France" refining capacity was 130,000 tons/yr. |
| August 3, 1944 | Terneuzen | Mission 513: 10 B-24s bombed Ghent/Terneuzen oil installations/dumps in the Netherlands. |
| August 4, 1944 | Bremen | 50 B-17s bombed the Bremen-Oslebshausen oil refinery. |
| August 4, 1944 | Hemmingstedt | Mission 514: The Hemmingstedt/Heide oil refinery was bombed. |
| August 4, 1944 | Hamburg-Harburg refineries | 181 B-17s bombed Hamburg refineries. The 487 BG bombed the Nordholz refinery, and the 486 BG was attacked by Me 163 Komets. |
| August 4, 1944 | Bec-d'Ambes | The Bec-d'Ambes refinery that had opened at the Garonne/Dordogne river junction in 1931 was bombed. |
| August 4, 1944 | Pauillac | The Pauillac oil store was bombed in clear conditions without encountering German fighters. |
| August 6, 1944 | Hemmingstedt | Mission 524: 23 B-17s bombed Hemmingstedt. |
| August 6, 1944 | Hamburg-Harburg refineries | Mission 524: Hamburg oil refineries bombed at Hamburg/Deutsche (54), Hamburg/Eband [sic] (33), Hamburg/Rhenania (61), Hamburg/Rhenania-Ossag (62), Hamburg/Schlieman (32), and Hamburg/Schulau (72 B-17s). Rhenania-Ossag was a subsidiary of Royal Dutch Shell. |
| August 6, 1944 | Genshagen | Mission 524: 74 B-17s bombed Genshagen, 45 hit Berlin diesel factories. |
| August 6, 1944 | Le Pontet | The 464 BG bombed a refinery at Le Pontet. |
| August 6, 1944 | Le Pouzin | Le Pouzin oil storage bombed in SE France. |
| August 6, 1944 | Lyon | Lyon oil storage bombed in SE France. |
| August 7, 1944 | Blechhammer North & South | The 464 BG bombed the Blechhammer North synthetic oil plant, and the 461 BG bombed the South plant. |
| August 7, 1944 | Novi Sad | 76 B-24s bombed Alibunar Airfield and Novi Sad oil facilities in Yugoslavia. |
| August 7, 1944 | Dungy | The 384 BG bombed the Dungy oil depot. |
| August 7, 1944 | Blechhammer North & South | 353 bombers attacked the synthetic oil refineries at Blechhammer South (B-17s) and North (B-24s). |
| August 7, 1944 | Trzebina | Mission 528: 55 B-17s and 29 P-51s attacked an "oil refinery at Trzebina, Poland" and returned to Operation Frantic bases in the Soviet Union. |
| August 8, 1944 | Hanover/Dollberg | The 398th BG bombed the Dollberg oil plant. Also known as Dollbergen, the village near Hanover had an oil refinery. |
| August 9, 1944 | Ploiești | The No. 205 Group RAF bombed the Româno-Americană refinery. The 205 Group also bombed Ploiești on August 17. |
| August 9, 1944 | Brod | B-17s bomb an oil refinery at Brod, Yugoslavia. |
| August 9, 1944 | Almásfüzitő | B-24s bomb an oil refinery at Budapest, Hungary. The 461 BG bombed the Almásfüzitő Oil Refinery. |
| August 10, 1944 | Bec-d'Ambes | 215 RAF aircraft dropped over 500 bombs and largely destroyed the Bec d'Ambes refinery 15 miles from Bordeaux. Bordeaux was also bombed on December 31, 1944 and the Focke-Wulf plant at Bordeaux was bombed on August 24, 1943. |
| August 10, 1944 | La Pallice | The La Pallice refinery 30 miles from Bordeaux was destroyed. |
| August 10, 1944 | Gennevilliers | Gennevilliers oil facility bombed |
| August 10, 1944 | Zeitz | The BRABAG synthetic oil plant in Zeitz was bombed. |
| August 10, 1944 | Ploiești | 450+ B-17s and B-24s bombed 6 oil refineries. The 464 BG bombed the Astra Română refinery, and the 461 BG bombed the Xenia oil refinery. |
| August 14, 1944 | | Mission 552: attacked 1 oil plant |
| August 15, 1944 | Magdeburg/Rothensee | Mission 556 bombed Magdeburg/Rothensee. The 487 BG had bombed the Magdeburg Focke-Wulf airplane factory on August 5, and the US Ninth Army captured Magdeburg on April 18, 1945. |
| August 15, 1944 | Leipzig/Rositz | Mission 556: 105 aircraft bombed. |
| August 15, 1944 | Zeitz | Mission 556: 101 aircraft bombed. |
| August 16, 1944 | Friedrichshafen | The 485 BG bombed the "Ober[raderach] chemical works". |
| August 16, 1944 | Leipzig/Rositz | The Rositz oil refinery was bombed. |
| August 16, 1944 | Leipzig/Böhlen | The 92 BG attacked the Böhlen oil refinery in Leipzig. |
| August 16, 1944 | Leipzig/Rositz | The 487 BG bombed the Rositz oil refinery. |
| August 16, 1944 | Zeitz | The 487 BG bombed the Zeitz oil refinery. |
| August 17, 1944 | Ploiești | Three oil refineries and targets of opportunity were bombed in the Ploiești area: Româno-Americană (by the 461 BG on their last Ploiești mission), "Astra Română Refinery" (450 BG) |
| August 18, 1944 | Ploiești (Româno-Americană) | 370 fighter-escorted B-17s and B-24s bombed 5 oil refineries around Ploiești. The 464 and 485 BGs bombed the "Americano" [sic] refinery. |
| August 18/19, 1944 | Oberhausen (Sterkrade) | 234 bombers attacked the synthetic oil plant. |
| August 19, 1944 | Ploiești | 65 B-17s with 125 P-51s escorts bombed 2 Ploiești area oil refineries. Ploiești was captured August 30 after a total of 350 bombers had been lost attacking the area. The Fifteenth Air Force had dropped 12,804 tons of explosives on Ploiești targets, On October 17, a Fifteenth Air Force B-17 carried a photo crew to Ploiești. |
| August 20, 1944 | Dubová | The oil refinery at Dubová was bombed. |
| August 20, 1944 | Dwory | First of 3 raids on the IG Farben synthetic rubber and oil plant near the Auschwitz III (Monowitz) forced labor camp that supplied slave labor: "It was the practice to brief bomber groups to steer clear of prisoner-of-war and concentration camps" (radar navigator-bombardier Milt Groban). Ultra intercepts reported impressive bombing results for oil targets: "for the first time, wehrwirtschaftlich (English: war economy) raids, which might deal a really fatal blow to Germany, had begun" (Speer). The town of Auschwitz (now called Oświęcim), the IG Farben Buna-Werke (under construction in November 1943), and the three concentration camp locations Auschwitz I, Auschwitz II (Birkenau), & Auschwitz III (Monowitz) were 5 separate facilities in the same region. |
| August 20, 1944 | Czechowice-Dziedzice | The 464 BG bombed the oil refinery at Czechowice. The Tschechowitz I & II subcamps of Auschwitz in Czechowice-Dziedzice provided forced labor for a SOCONY-Vacuum plant. |
| August 21, 1944 | Vienna | The 484 BG received its second DUC for bombing an underground oil storage installation at Vienna. |
| August 22, 1944 | Odertal | B-17s bombed the oil refinery at Odertal, Germany (German: Deschowitz, Polish: Zdzieszowice). POW camp E162 was at Odertal. |
| August 22, 1944 | Korneuburg | B-24s bombed the oil refinery at Korneuburg. The 485 BG bombed the "Koreneuberg [sic] Oil Storage". |
| August 22, 1944 | Blechhammer | B-24s bombed the oil refinery at Blechhammer. |
| August 22, 1944 | Vienna (Lobau) | B-24s bombed the Lobau oil refinery. The 461 BG bombed the underground oil storage at the refinery. |
| August 23, 1944 | Vienna (Vösendorf) | The Vösendorf oil refinery was bombed in the southern industrial area of Vienna. |
| August 24, 1944 | Brüx | Mission 568: 139 B-17s hit Brüx. |
| August 24, 1944 | Pardubice region | The 485 BG bombed the Pardubice oil refinery. |
| August 24, 1944 | Dresden/Freital | Mission 568: 65 B-17s bombed Freital oil industry. This mission to Freital and Dresden was the 486 BG's longest mission. Dresden had a "Dresden Reick A.G." grinding wheel plant. |
| August 24, 1944 | Hanover (Deurag-Nerag) | Mission 568: 88 B-24s bombed the Misburg oil refinery. |
| August 24, 1944 | Leipzig/Leuna | Mission 568: 185 B-17s bombed Leuna/Merseburg. |
| August 24, 1944 | Ruhland-Schwarzheide | Mission 568: 135 B-17s hit Ruhland. |
| August 24, 1944 | Kolín | Three oil refineries were bombed at Kolín. |
| August 24, 1944 | Pardubice region | The 464 BG earned a Distinguished Unit Citation for bombing the Fanto Werke refinery at Pardubice. |
| August 25, 1944 | Pölitz | Mission 570: 169 B-17s bombed. |
| August 26, 1944 | Dülmen | Mission 576: 73 B-24s bombed the Dülmen fuel dump. |
| August 26, 1944 | Emmerich am Rhein | Mission 576: 36 B-24s bomb the Emmerich oil refinery. |
| August 26, 1944 | France | IX Bomber Command, with fighter escort, bombed French fuel dumps at Saint-Gobain, Fournival/Bois-de-Mont, Compiègne/Clairoix. |
| August 26, 1944 | Gelsenkirchen (Nordstern) | Mission 576: 85 B-17s bombed Gelsenkirchen/Nordstern. |
| August 26, 1944 | Ludwigshafen-Oppau | Mission 576: 41 B-24s bombed the "chemical works". |
| August 26, 1944 | Salzbergen | Mission 576: 71 B-24s bombed the "Wintershell [sic] oil refinery" (60,000 tons/year) at Salzbergen. |
| August 26, 1944 | Gelsenkirchen (Scholven/Buer) | Mission 576: 89 B-17s bombed the Gelsenkirchen/Buer oil refinery. |
| August 27, 1944 | Homberg | The RAF restarted daylight bombing of Germany with an attack on the Homberg Fischer-Tropsch plant. |
| August 27, 1944 | Blechhammer South | The 464 and 485 BGs bombed the Blechhammer South synthetic oil plant (the 485th commander became a POW). |
| August 28, 1944 | Vienna (Moosbierbaum) | B-17s hit Moosbierbaum oil refinery and adjacent chemical works. |
| August 28, 1944 | Szőny | The 464 and 485 BGs bombed the oil refinery. |
| August 29, 1944 | Pardubice region | Czechoslovak oil refineries bombed included the Moravská–Ostrava oil refineries A minor Moravská Ostrava crude oil refinery was at Prwoz. |
| August 30, 1944 | Ploiești | Soviet Red Army forces reached Bucharest on August 28, and the Ploiești oilfields on August 30. |
| September 3, 1944 | United Kingdom | After a lull in V-1 flying bomb attacks, the Allied Combined Strategic Targets Committee (CSTC) switched the top bombing priority from Operation Crossbow to oil targets. 39% of US bomb tonnage from Oct-Dec was on synthetic oil plants. |
| September 3, 1944 | Ludwigshafen | Mission 601: 325 of 345 B-17s bombed the Ludwigshafen/Opau [sic] synthetic oil plant. |
| September 5, 1944 | Ludwigshafen | Mission 605: 277 of 303 B-17s bombed the Ludwigshafen synthetic oil plant. |
| September 7, 1944 | Ministry of Armaments and War Production | After Speer completed the Effects of the Air War on September 6, the President of the Rustungskommando VI (5) ordered only 3 days or less of production be stored, and emergency preparation for the transfer of POL plants was initiated (e.g., identification of vital parts for removal). "On principle, plants are only to be crippled temporarily by removing various elements to safety, particularly the electrical ones." (Speer telegram, September 13). August "chemical plant" production was 10% of former capacity. At the beginning of September, 1944, the Luftwaffe minimum fuel allotment was decreased from 160,000 monthly tons to 30,000 due to shortages. |
| September 8, 1944 | Ludwigshafen | Mission 611: 348 of 384 B-17s attacked the Ludwigshafen/Opau oil refinery. |
| September 8, 1944 | Kassel | Mission 611: 166 B-17s bombed an oil depot at Kassel. |
| September 10, 1944 | Vienna | 344 B-17s and B-24s bombed 5 ordnance depots and the SE industrial area in Vienna and 2 oil refineries in the area. |
| September 10, 1944 | Vienna (Schwechat) | The 32 BS bombed the Schwechat oil refinery. |
| September 11, 1944 | Castrop-Rauxel | The synthetic oil plant was bombed. |
| September 11, 1944 | Chemnitz | Mission 623: An Operation Frantic force of 75 B-17s bombed the Chemnitz oil refinery and, along with 64 P-51s, continued to the USSR. In 1945, Chemnitz was also bombed on February 14 and the 466th bombed Chemnitz on March 5. |
| September 11, 1944 | Dortmund | The Dortmund synthetic oil plant was bombed. |
| September 11, 1944 | Fulda | Mission 623: At Fulda, 66 B-17s bombed the tire plant and 40 bombed the marshalling yard. Fulda also was the location of Gebauer & Moller ball bearing plant, and on September 12 (Mission 626), 46 B-17s bombed a Fulda target. |
| September 11, 1944 | Gelsenkirchen (Nordstern) | |
| September 11, 1944 | Gelsenkirchen (Scholven/Buer) | The Scholven/Buer synthetic oil plant was bombed. The RAF bombed a Gelsenkirchen target on September 29/30, as did the 466th on September 12 & 13, November 6 (the 466th bombed a Münster target on September 12 and March 25, 1945). |
| September 11, 1944 | Hanover (Deurag-Nerag) | Mission 623: 87 B-24s bombed the oil refinery at Misburg and 88 bombed an engine factory at Hanover. |
| September 11, 1944 | Kamen | The synthetic oil plant at Kamen was bombed. |
| September 11, 1944 | Leipzig/Böhlen | Mission 623: 75 B-17s bombed the Böhlen oil refinery. Böhlen was also bombed on August 15 (Mission 556), and the 384 BG bombed "Böhlen/Leipzig" on March 19, 1945. |
| September 11, 1944 | Leipzig/Leuna | Mission 623: 111 B-17s bombed Merseburg. |
| September 11, 1944 | Lützkendorf | Mission 623: 96 B-17s bombed Lützkendorf. |
| September 11, 1944 | Magdeburg | Mission 623: At Magdeburg, 33 B-24s bombed the oil refinery and 27 bombed an ordnance depot. |
| September 11, 1944 | Ruhland-Schwarzheide | Mission 623: 22 B-17s bombed the Ruhland oil refinery. |
| September 11, 1944 | Wanne-Eickel | Wanne-Eickel synthetic oil plant bombed. A Wanne-Eickel target was also attacked by the 466th on July 25 and by US Forces in November 1944. |
| September 11, 1944 | Brüx | Mission 623: 39 B-17s bombed Brüx. |
| September 12, 1944 | Dortmund | The Hoesch-Benzin GmbH synthetic oil plant at Dortmund was bombed. |
| September 12, 1944 | Gelsenkirchen (Scholven/Buer) | The synthetic oil plant was bombed. |
| September 12, 1944 | Wanne-Eickel | The synthetic oil plant was bombed. |
| September 12, 1944 | Hanover (Deurag-Nerag) | Mission 626 dispatched 888 bombers and 662 fighters to 6 oil targets, including 34 B-24s that bombed Misburg oil industry. Misburg bomb damage from the September 11 & 12 attacks was repaired by October 15. |
| September 12, 1944 | Hemmingstedt | Mission 626: 66 B-24s bombed Hemmingstedt. |
| September 12, 1944 | Leipzig/Böhlen | Mission 626: 35 B-17s bombed a Böhlen oil industry target. |
| September 12, 1944 | Magdeburg/Friedrichstadt | Mission 626: 73 B-17s bombed a Magdeburg/Friedrichstadt oil target. |
| September 12, 1944 | Magdeburg/Rothensee | Mission 626: 144 B-17s bombed Magdeburg/Rothensee |
| September 12, 1944 | Ruhland-Schwarzheide | Mission 626: 59 B-17s bombed the Ruhland oil refinery. |
| September 12, 1944 | Brüx | Mission 626: 79 B-17s bombed the oil refinery at Brux. |
| September 13, 1944 | Gelsenkirchen (Nordstern) | The synthetic oil plant was bombed. |
| September 13, 1944 | Leipzig/Leuna | Mission 628: 141 B-17s bombed Merseburg. |
| September 13, 1944 | Lützkendorf | Mission 628: 77 B-17s bombed Lützkendorf. |
| September 13, 1944 | Blechhammer North | B-17s bombed Blechhammer North. |
| September 13, 1944 | Leipzig/Merseburg (Altenburg) | The 92 BG bombed the Altenburg oil refineries at "Merseburg". |
| September 13, 1944 | Ludwigshafen | Mission 628: 74 B-17s bombed the oil refinery. |
| September 13, 1944 | Odertal | B-24s bombed the oil refinery at Odertal. An Odertal target was also bombed in bad weather on October 16. |
| September 13, 1944 | Stuttgart/Sindelfingen | Mission 628: 109 B-17s bombed the oil refinery at Stuttgart/Sindelfingen. Sindelfingen also had a Daimler Benz truck plant, and an aircraft engine factory at Sindelfingen was bombed on September 10, 1944. |
| September 13, 1944 | Dwory | The 464 BG bombed the Auschwitz synthetic oil and rubber plant. |
| September 14, 1944 | Hemmingstedt | Mission 629: 6 of 11 B-24s are dispatched on an Azon mission to the oil refinery at Hemmingstedt; 5 hit the secondary target, ammunition dumps at Kropp. Both Operation Aphrodite drones (B-17 30363, "Ruth L III", & B-17 39827) targeting the Hemmingstedt oil refinery missed due to weather. On this date 5000 planes flew over Germany. |
| September 17, 1944 | Germany | "…the enemy always… after the resumption of work, …destroy[s] these [synthetic oil] installations again by air attack" (Speer). On July 20, Speer met with Ambassador Clodius of the Foreign Office regarding the "safeguarding of Rumanian oil." September "chemical plant" production was 5.5% of former capacity. |
| September 17, 1944 | Budapest | 440+ B-17s and B-24s, with fighter escort, attacked 2 oil refineries and 4 marshalling yards in the Budapest area. The 464 BG bombed the Shell oil refinery at Budapest and the 485 BG bombed the "Magyar Oil Refinery". |
| September 20, 1944 | Bratislava | In Czechoslovakia, the Bratislava "oil district" was bombed. Bratislava was the site of the Apollo refinery. The Bratislava "industrial area" was bombed on May 16, 1944, the "marshalling yards" were bombed on October 14, 1944, and "the town" of Bratislava was bombed on February 7, 1945. |
| September 21, 1944 | Ludwigshafen | Mission 644: 147 of 154 dispatched B-17s bombed the synthetic oil plant at Ludwigshafen/Opau [sic]. |
| September 23, 1944 | Brüx | 147 B-17s, escorted by 290 P-38s and P-51s, bombed the Brüx synthetic oil refinery and the marshalling yard at Wels. Wels also had an aircraft facility. |
| September 25, 1944 | Ludwigshafen | Mission 647: B-17s bombed the Ludwigshafen/Opau [sic] "synthetic oil plant". |
| September 26, 1944 | Frankfurt am Main | The chemical factory at Hochst, just west of Frankfurt, was bombed. The "cavernous I.G. Farben complex at Frankfurt became Eisenhower's permanent headquarters on June 1, 1945. |
| September 27, 1944 | Bottrop-Welheim | The Ruhröl AG synthetic oil plant in the Welheim suburb of Bottrop was bombed. The 466th also bombed Bottrop on July 20, 1944 and March 16, 1945. |
| September 27, 1944 | Ludwigshafen | Mission 650: 214 B-17s bombed the Ludwigshafen/Opau [sic] oil refinery. A Ludwigshafen target was also bombed on October 13 (Mission 662). |
| September 27, 1944 | Oberhausen (Sterkrade) | |
| September 28, 1944 | Magdeburg/Rothensee | Mission 652: 23 B-17s bombed the Magdeburg/Rothensee oil refinery. |
| September 28, 1944 | Leipzig/Leuna | Mission 652: 301 of 342 dispatched B-17s bombed the "Merseburg/Leuna oil refinery". |
| September 30, 1944 | Bottrop | 1 of 136 bombers attempted to hit the cloud-covered oil plant. |
| September 30, 1944 | Oberhausen (Sterkrade) | 24 of 139 bombers attempted to hit the cloud-covered oil plant |
| September 30/01, 1944 | Oberhausen (Sterkrade) | 5 Mosquitoes to Hamburg bombed Sterkrade. |
| October 3, 1944 | Wesseling | Mission 662: 87 B-17s were dispatched to bomb the Wesseling oil refinery. |
| October 6, 1944 | Gelsenkirchen (Nordstern) | The synthetic oil plant was bombed. |
| October 6, 1944 | Oberhausen (Sterkrade) | The 466th bombed Sterkrade. |
| October 6, 1944 | Hamburg-Harburg refineries | Mission 667: 121 of 406 dispatched B-24s bomb the Harburg/Rhenania oil refinery. Harburg also had a Phoenix tire plant. |
| October 7, 1944 | Blechhammer South | The Tuskegee Airmen provided escort. |
| October 7, 1944 | Kassel/Altenbauna | Mission 669: 88 B-24s bombed the oil refinery at Kassel/Altenbauna and 122 bombed the armored vehicle plant at Kassel/Henschel. Kassel also had two Fieseler plants: Bettenhausen & Waldau. |
| October 7, 1944 | Leipzig/Böhlen | Mission 669: 86 B-17s bombed the oil plant. |
| October 7, 1944 | Leipzig/Leuna | Mission 669: 129 B-17s bombed the oil plant. |
| October 7, 1944 | Lützkendorf | Mission 669: 88 B-17s bombed the oil plant. |
| October 7, 1944 | Magdeburg/Buckau | Mission 669: 62 B-24s bombed the Magdeburg/Buckau oil refinery. |
| October 7, 1944 | Magdeburg/Rothensee | Mission 669: 25 B-24s bombed the Magdeburg/Rothensee oil refinery. |
| October 7, 1944 | Pölitz | Mission 669: 142 B-17s bombed the "oil refinery". |
| October 7, 1944 | Ruhland-Schwarzheide | Mission 669: 59 B-17s bombed the "oil refinery". |
| October 7, 1944 | Vienna (Lobau) | The 741st Bombardment Squadron flew over Vienna to hit an oil refinery, and the Lobau oil refinery was bombed. |
| October 7, 1944 | Vienna (Schwechat) | The Schwechat oil refinery was bombed. |
| October 7, 1944 | Vienna (Winterhafen) | The 450 BG bombed the "Winter Hafen [sic] Oil Depot" in Vienna. |
| October 11, 1944 | Blechhammer | Blechhammer bombed. |
| October 11, 1944 | Leverhausen | At Leverhausen in the Ruhr, the "largest chemical factory in Europe" was bombed. |
| October 11, 1944 | Wesseling | Mission 672: 57 B-17s dispatched to bomb the Wesseling synthetic oil plant. The 384 BG bombed the Wesseling/Koblenz oil facility. |
| October 11 & 13, 1944 | Vienna (Floridsdorf) | The Floridsdorf oil refinery was bombed. |
| October 12, 1944 | Wanne-Eickel | The synthetic oil plant was bombed. |
| October 12 & 13, 1944 | Blechhammer South | Blechhammer South was bombed on the 12th and by the 301 BG on the 13th. |
| October 14, 1944 | Blechhammer North | Blechhammer North was bombed in bad weather. |
| October 15, 1944 | Düsseldorf-Reisholz | Mission 677: 61 B-24s bombed the Düsseldorf-Reisholz oil facility. The Düsseldorf refinery produced 25,000 tons/year and had a Deutsche Carborundum grinding wheel plant. |
| October 15, 1944 | Monheim am Rhein | Mission 677: 64 B-24s bombed a Monheim/Rhenania oil facility. |
| October 16, 1944 | Linz | The benzol plant and ordnance depot at Linz was bombed. Linz also had a "steelworks". |
| October 16, 1944 | Brüx | Brüx and an armament works in Pilsen were bombed. |
| October 17, 1944 | Leverkusen | Mission 681: Weather prevented 430 B-24s from attacking a synthetic rubber plant at Leverkusen. Leverkusen was the location of a Bayer (Standard Oil/IG Farben) plant. In 1943, targets at Leverkusen were attacked on August 22/23 (a complete failure) and by the RAF on November 19/20, and December 10/11. Up to 1941, there were 5 Nazi Germany Buna plants that produced Buna N by the Lebedev process. |
| October 17, 1944 | Blechhammer South | |
| October 17, 1944 | Austria | The industrial area of Vienna was bombed. |
| October 18, 1944 | CSTC | Allied policy was changed to bomb oil targets even if reconnaissance was not available. After Eisenhower notified Marshall on October 23 that the bombing of oil targets was being successful, oil targets were retained in the highest priority, and the German rail system was made the second priority.^27.80 |
| October 19, 1944 | Ludwigshafen | An oil refinery at "Ludwigshafen & Mannheim" was bombed. |
| October 20, 1944 | Brüx | After having been out of operation for 4 months, the Brüx oil refinery was bombed. |
| October 20, 1944 | Regensburg | Oil storage at Regensburg was bombed. |
| October 23, 1944 | Regensburg | Regensburg oil storage depot bombed. |
| October 25, 1944 | Hamburg-Harburg refineries | Mission 688: 455 B-17s dispatched to hit the Harburg (221) and Rhenania oil refineries (214) at Hamburg. 297 B-17s dispatched to hit the primary hit secondaries, Harburg (179) and Rhenania oil refineries (106) at Hamburg. |
| October 25, 1944 | Gelsenkirchen (Nordstern) | Mission 688: 27 B-24s bombed Gelsenkirchen/Nordstern. |
| October 25, 1944 | Gelsenkirchen (Scholven/Buer) | Mission 688: 91 B-24s bombed Gelsenkirchen/Buer; 34 hit the secondary at Münster and 1 hits Gronau. |
| October 26, 1944 | Hamburg-Harburg | The 92 BG bombed the two oil storage complexes in Hamburg. |
| October 30, 1944 | Hamburg-Harburg refineries | Mission 693: 357 B-24s are dispatched to hit the Harburg oil refinery (72) and Rhenania oil refinery (67) at Hamburg; targets of opportunity are Hamburg (28), Cuxhaven (25), Wesermunde (21), Uetersen (9), Bremen (1). |
| October 30, 1944 | Gelsenkirchen/Hamm | The 384 BG bombed the Gelsenkirchen/Hamm synthetic oil plant and marshalling yards. |
| October 31, 1944 | Bottrop-Welheim | 101 bombers attacked the Ruhröl AG synthetic oil plant. |
| November 1944 | Germany | Chemical plant production in October was 10% of former capacity and 28% (1633 tons/day) in November. |
| November 1, 1944 | United Kingdom | After the British Air Staff requested on June 3 that RAF Bomber Command attack Ruhr oil plants, and Portal unsuccessfully attempted on July 5, 1944, to "move Harris away from area bombing to join the attacks on oil", the Air Staff ordered Harris to bomb oil targets. |
| November 1, 1944 | Gelsenkirchen (Nordstern) | The 384 BG bombed the "Gelsenkirchen/Nordsten" [sic] synthetic oil plant. |
| November 1, 1944 | Gelsenkirchen (Scholven/Buer) | 143 bombers attacked the synthetic oil plant. |
| November 2, 1944 | Castrop-Rauxel | 131 bombers attacked the Union Victor synthetic oil plant. |
| November 2, 1944 | Leipzig/Leuna | After 459 B-17s dispatched to bomb Leuna were recalled on October 30 due to weather, 700 US bombers escorted by 750 fighters attacked the Leuna synthetic oil plant. Leuna production was interrupted (but returned to 28% of capacity by November 20), and 6 more heavy attacks on Leuna through December were "largely ineffective because of adverse weather" |
| November 2, 1944 | Oberhausen (Sterkrade) | The 384 BG bombed the Sterkrade (Holten) synthetic oil plant. |
| November 3, 1944 | Vienna/Moosbierbaum | 2 of 3 PFF B-24s of the 450 BG bombed. The 450 BG also bombed Moosbierbaum on November 6; December 8 & 11; January 31; February 1, 7, & 9; and March 1 & 15. |
| November 4, 1944 | Bottrop-Welheim | The 384 BG bombed the Bottrop (Welheim) synthetic oil plant. |
| November 4, 1944 | Gelsenkirchen (Nordstern) | 133 bombers attacked the synthetic oil plant. |
| November 4, 1944 | Hamburg-Harburg refineries | The 447 BG bombed the Hamburg/Rhenania oil refinery and the 92 BG bombed the Harburg oil complex. The production capacity of the Phoenix tire plant at Harburg was 50,000 tires/month. |
| November 4, 1944 | Ludwigshafen | The 447 BG bombed the Ludwigshafen oil refinery. Ludwigshafen was also bombed as a diversion during the Battle of Berlin on November 18/19, 1943. |
| November 4, 1944 | Neuenkirchen | The 487 BG bombed the Neuenkirchen coking plant and the 452 BG bombed the "Benzalube Stoking Plant" at Neunkirchen on a Micro H experimental mission. |
| November 4, 1944 | Regensburg | The 32 BS bombed Regensburg oil storage. |
| November 4 & 11-15, 1944 | Linz | The 485 BG bombed the benzol oil refinery. |
| November 4 & 7, 1944 | Vienna (Floridsdorf) | The 32 BS bombed. |
| November 5, 1944 | Vienna (Floridsdorf) | The 450 BG & 485 BG bombed the oil refinery. The 450 BG also bombed the "Floridsdorf Oil Refinery" on October 11, November 17, December 2 (as an alternate on a Straszhof Austria mission), & December 18 (the marshalling yard on March 12). |
| November 5, 1944 | Ludwigshafen-Oppau | The 487 BG bombed the Ludwigshafen chemical works. A Ludwigshafen target was also bombed by the 466th on January 1, 1945. |
| November 6, 1944 | Duisburg | 65 bombers attacked the Bruckhausen coking plant. |
| November 6, 1944 | Oberhausen (Sterkrade) | 134 bombers attacked the synthetic oil plant. |
| November 6, 1944 | Gelsenkirchen (Nordstern) | 738 bombers attacked the synthetic oil plant. |
| November 6, 12-17 & 19, 1944 | Vienna (Moosbierbaum) | The 32 BS bombed the Moosbierbaum oil refinery. |
| November 6, 1944 | Bottrop-Welheim | The 384 BG bombed the Bottrop (Welheim) synthetic oil plant. |
| November 6, 1944 | Hamburg-Harburg refineries | The 92 BG bombed the Harburg oil complex. |
| November 8, 1944 | Leipzig/Leuna | The 384 BG bombed the Merseburg rubber facility and the 92 BG bombed the Leuna oil complex. |
| November 9, 1944 | Wanne-Eickel | 277 bombers attacked the synthetic oil plant. |
| November 10, 1944 | Wiesbaden | The 452 BG bombed the oil plant: "Although other Aircraft, friendly, may be under you, drop your bombs" (Wing Commander). 9 B-17s also bombed a Wiesbaden target on November 13 (Mission 628). |
| November 11, 1944 | Germany | A Speer memorandum identified that the oil and margarine plants in the Ruhr were on the verge of shutdown. The Vienna area had no fuel after November 15 (US intelligence report, February 1945). |
| November 11, 1944 | Castrop-Rauxel | 122 bombers attacked the synthetic oil plant. |
| November 11, 1944 | Gelsenkirchen (Scholven/Buer) | 100 bombers attacked the synthetic oil plant. |
| November 11, 1944 | Bottrop-Welheim | 124 bombers attacked the synthetic oil plant. |
| November 11, 1944 | Vienna/Kajren | The 450 BG bombed the "Kajren Oil Refinery". |
| November 11/12 & 15, 1944 | Dortmund | The Hoesch-Benzin synthetic oil plant was bombed. |
| November 13, 1944 | Blechhammer South | The 32 BS bombed the South plant. Only 1 of 3 Pathfinders B-24s of the 450 BG was able to bomb "Blochhammer Synthetic, Oppeln [province], Germany", (25 miles from Opole). Oppeln also had labor camps E17 (a cement factory), E419 and at Schalkendorf; Oderthal had labor camp E162; and Heydebreck had E711A. |
| November 13, 25, & 30, 1944 | Linz | The 32 BS bombed the Linz benzol plant. |
| November 17 & 20, 1944 | Blechhammer South | The 485 BG bombed the synthetic oil refinery. |
| November 18, 1944 | Austria | The 32 BS bombed a Vienna oil refinery. |
| November 18/19, 1944 | Wanne-Eickel | 309bombers attacked the synthetic oil plant. |
| November 19, 1944 | Vienna/Schwechat | 18 B-24s of the 450 BG bombed and hit both the refinery and the "Winterhafen Storage Facility" and 5 bombed the alternate target, the "Győr Marshalling Yard". |
| November 20, 1944 | Gelsenkirchen (Scholven/Buer) | 61 bombers attacked the synthetic oil plant. |
| November 20, 1944 | Hanover (Deurag-Nerag) | Bomb damage from the attack was repaired by December 23. |
| November 21, 1944 | Koblenz | The 447 BG bombed the oil refinery at Koblenz. |
| November 21, 1944 | Leipzig/Leuna | The 486 BG bombed Merseburg. |
| November 21/22, 1944 | Castrop-Rauxel | 273 bombers attacked the synthetic oil plant. |
| November 21/22, 1944 | Oberhausen (Sterkrade) | 270 bombers attacked the synthetic oil plant. |
| November 23, 1944 | Gelsenkirchen (Nordstern) | 168 RAF bombers and 134 USAAF bombers attacked the synthetic oil plant. |
| November 25, 1944 | Leipzig/Leuna | The 447 BG bombed the synthetic oil plant at Merseburg. |
| November 26, 1944 | Hanover (Deurag-Nerag) | The 491 BG earned a DUC for bombing an oil refinery at Misburg. |
| November 29, 1944 | Hanover (Deurag-Nerag) | The 384 BG bombed the Misburg oil refinery. |
| November 30, 1944 | Leipzig/Leuna | The 487 BG bombed. |
| November 30, 1944 | Lützkendorf | The 452 BG bombed the "Lützkendorf, Germany (Merseburg)" synthetic oil plant: "Merseburg is infested with enemy fighters" (B-17 "IDA WANN" crewmember of the 452 BG). |
| November 30, 1944 | Zeitz | The 384 BG bombed the Zeitz oil facility. |
| December 2, 1944 | Dortmund | 83 bombers attacked the Zeche Hansa coking plant. |
| December 6, 1944 | Leipzig/Leuna | Mission 741: 446 B-17s bombed. |
| December 11, 1944 | Oberhausen (Osterfeld) | The Osterfeld coking plant was bombed. |
| December 12, 1944 | Blechhammer South | The 32 BS bombed the South plant. |
| December 6, 1944 | Leipzig/Leuna | The 384 BG bombed the Leuna oil refinery. |
| December 9, 1944 | Regensburg oil refinery | A Regensburg oil refinery was bombed. Regensburg had four small oil refineries for a total production of 80,000 tons/year. |
| December 11, 1944 | Vienna (Moosbierbaum) | The oil refinery was bombed. |
| December 12, 1944 | Blechhammer South | 6 PFF B-24s of the 450 BG bombed the primary and alternate targets, as well as a target of opportunity. |
| December 12, 1944 | Leipzig/Leuna | Mission 748: 337 B-17s bombed the synthetic oil plant. |
| December 12, 1944 | Pardubice region | The 485 BG bombed the "Norravska" [sic] oil refinery. |
| December 15, 1944 | ^{[Expand]} | German oil storage was bombed at Heimbach, Wollseifen, Harperscheid, Schonau, Ruthen, and Dorsel. |
| December 16, 1944 | Linz | The benzol plant was bombed. The 450 BG had been unable to bomb Linz on December 3 and instead bombed the Villach Marshalling Yard (also bombed the "North Main Marshalling Yard" in Linz on January 8, February 25, & March 31; "South Main" on January 8). |
| December 16, 1944 | Brüx | The lead 741st BS pilot bypassed the Brüx refinery target: "I'm not sure to this day that he wasn't right in avoiding that almost suicidal bomb run." (741st pilot George McGovern) |
| December 16, 1944 | Germany | Unternehmen Bodenplatte for "capturing Allied fuel stocks" began with insufficient fuel. |
| December 17, 1944 | Odertal oil refinery | B-24 42-51430 ("Tulsaamerican") ditched off the Vis Island coast. |
| December 17, 1944 | Pardubice region | The Moravská-Ostrava oil refinery was bombed. |
| December 18, 1944 | Blechhammer North & South | |
| December 18, 1944 | Odertal | The Odertal oil refinery was bombed. |
| December 18, 1944 | Vienna (Floridsdorf) | |
| December 18, 1944 | Pardubice region | The Moravská-Ostrava oil refinery was bombed. |
December 18, 1944
| September 13, 1944 | Dwory | US bombers attacked the "Monowitz synthetic plant". |
| December 19, 1944 | Blechhammer North & South | |
| December 19, 1944 | Pardubice region | The Moravská-Ostrava oil refinery was bombed. |
| December 20, 1944 | Regensburg oil refinery | The Regensburg oil refinery was bombed. |
| December 21/22, 1944 | Pölitz | 209 aircraft bombed the Pölitz synthetic-oil refinery. Parts of the plant were damaged and the power-station chimneys collapsed. |
| December 22, 1944 | | "The most notable [advances] are the new [Type XXI] submarines and [synthetic] fuels, rockets, and jet propulsion generally.…It is…production rather than invention, particularly of synthetic fuels, that is going to be Germany's main difficulty." (R. V. Jones report to Winston Churchill) |
| December 25, 1944 | Brüx | 253 B-17s and B-24s bombed the Brüx synthetic oil plant and main marshalling yards at Wels. |
| December 18, 1944 | Odertal | The Odertal oil refinery was bombed. |
| September 13, 1944 | Dwory | The Auschwitz oil refinery [sic] was bombed. |
| December 27, 1944 | Vienna (Vösendorf) | The Vosendorf oil refinery was bombed. |
| December 28, 1944 | Regensburg | The Regensburg oil storage and freight yard was bombed. |
| December 28, 1944 | Kolín | The oil refinery was bombed. |
| December 28, 1944 | Kralupy | The oil refinery was bombed. |
| December 28, 1944 | Pardubice region | The Pardubice oil refinery was bombed. |
| December 28, 1944 | Roudnice | The Roudnice nad Labem oil storage and sidings were bombed. |
| December 29/30, 1944 | Gelsenkirchen (Scholven/Buer) | 346 bombers attacked the synthetic oil plant. |
| December 31, 1944 | Hamburg-Harburg refineries | Mission 772: In Hamburg, 96 B-17s bombed the Wilhemsburg [sic] refinery, 71 bombed the Grassbruk refinery, 68 bombed other oil industry targets, and 72 bombed other industrial area targets. |
| December 31, 1944 | Hanover (Deurag-Nerag) | Mission 772: 96 B-17s bombed the Hamburg oil refinery (bomb damage was repaired by February 14). |
| January 1, 1945 | Hanover/Dollbergen | B-17s bombed the Dollbergen oil facility as a target of opportunity. |
| January 1, 1945 | Dortmund coking plant | The 466th bombed the "Dortmund Hoesch Coking Plant". |
| January 1/2, 1945 | Dortmund (Minster Stein) | |
| January 1, 1945 | Ehmen | The 487 BG bombed the Ehmen storage depot. |
| January 1, 1945 | Kassel | The 384 BG bombed Derben (primary) and Kassel (secondary) targets: a vehicle workshop and an oil storage depot. |
| January 3, 1945 | | "…the chimera of one air operation that will end the war…does not exist. …much of the Russian advance is due to the immobility conferred on the German ground forces by our attacks on oil." (Spaatz letter to Barney Giles) |
| January 3, 1945 | Castrop-Rauxel | |
| January 3, 1945 | Dortmund (Hansa) | The Hansa coking plant was bombed in Dortmund, which refined oils into higher grade fuels. A Gelsenkirchener Bergwerke oil plant was in Dortmund. |
| January 7, 1945 | | Mission 785: A Pathfinder force bombed an oil storage depot in W Germany. |
| January 8, 1945 | Pölitz | Bombing "put the works out of action for the remainder of the war". |
| January 1945 | Germany | Hungarian petroleum deposits and the nearby refineries "are indispensable" after bombing of the German coal hydrogenation plants (Hitler). |
| January 13/14, 1945 | Pölitz | |
| January 14, 1945 | Kassel/Derben | Mission 792: 186 B-17s bombed an oil target at Derben. |
| January 14, 1945 | Ehmen | Mission 792: 89 B-24s bombed an oil target at Ehmen. |
| January 14, 1945 | Hallendorf | Mission 792: 145 B-24s bombed an oil target at Hallendorf. |
| January 14, 1945 | Hemmingstedt | Mission 792: 91 B-24s bombed an oil target at Hemmingstedt. |
| January 14, 1945 | Magdeburg/Rothensee | Mission 792: 90 B-17s bombed oil targets at Magdeburg. |
| January 15, 1945 | Bochum | The Robert Muser coking plant was bombed. |
| January 15, 1945 | Recklinghausen | Oil production at the Recklinghausen/Forstezung coking plant was bombed. |
| January 16, 1945 | Dessau | At Dessau, the 447 BG bombed the "oil plant" and the 487 BG bombed the "marshalling yards". |
| January 16, 1945 | Hamburg-Harburg | The USAAF bombed oil production at Harburg. |
| January 16, 1945 | Magdeburg/Rothensee | Mission 796: 61 B-17s hit the Rothensee synthetic oil plant at Magdeburg. Magdeburg targets were bombed by the RAF on January 14/15 and, in the first major raid on Magdeburg, on January 21/22. Magdeburg may also have been bombed on February 22. |
| January 16, 1945 | Ruhland-Schwarzheide | Mission 796: 67 B-17s bombed the Ruhland oil plant. |
| January 16, 1945 | Brüx | The 106th bombed Brüx. |
| January 16/17, 1945 | Brüx | This attack and an earlier U.S. PFF attack on December 25 immobilized "the giant synthetic plant at BRUX". By February 6, Brüx had experienced the worst damage since bombing started and production was not expected to resume for 2 months (with no prospect for resuming crude refining). |
| January 16/17, 1945 | Wanne-Eickel | The coking plant was bombed. |
| January 17, 1945 | Hamburg-Harburg | Mission 798: 158 B-17s are dispatched to hit the Rhenania (40) and Albrecht (34) oil refineries at Hamburg and the U-boat base at Hamburg (73). 78 of 84 B-24s hit the Rhenania oil refinery at Harburg. |
| January 20, 1945 | Regensburg | The 32 BS bombed Regensburg oil storage. |
| January 20, 1945 | Oberhausen (Sterkrade) | Mission 801: 36 of 309 B-17s bombed the Holten oil plant at Sterkrade. |
| January 21, 1945 | Aschaffenburg | Mission 803: 66 B-17s bombed the oil plant at Aschaffenburg. |
| January 21, 1945 | Vienna (Lobau) | B-17s bombed the Lobau oil refinery. |
| January 21, 1945 | Vienna (Schwechat) | B-17s bombed the Schwechat oil refinery. |
| January 21, 1945 | Fiume | 43 P-38s bombed an oil refinery at Fiume, Italy. |
| January 22, 1945 | Gelsenkirchen | The 466th bombed Gelsenkirchen. |
| January 22, 1945 | Oberhausen (Sterkrade) | Mission 805: 167 B-17s were dispatched for visual attacks on the Holten synthetic oil plant at Sterkrade. |
| January 22/23, 1945 | Duisburg | A heavy attack on the Bruckhausen benzol plant at Duisburg-Hamborn inflicted severe damage. |
| January 23, 1945 | Gelsenchirchen (Consolidation) | The "CONSOLIDATED L/VT plant" at Gelsenkirchen was rendered inactive by an area attack. |
| January 28, 1945 | Dortmund | Mission 809: 58 B-24s bombed an oil target at Gneisenau. |
| January 28, 1945 | Dortmund | Mission 809: 115 B-24s bombed the Kaiserstuhl and Gneisenau coking plants at Dortmund. |
| January 29, 1945 | Kassel | Mission 811: 93 B-17s bombed the Henschel oil plant at Kassel using H2X radar. |
| January 31 & February 3, 1945 | Dortmund benzol plant | The "HANSA Benzol Plant" was bombed. |
| January 31 & February 1, 1945 | Duisburg | The "BRUCKHAUSEN Benzol Plant" was bombed. |
| January 31, 1945 | Vienna (Moosbierbaum) | In a blind attack, 670+ B-24s and B-17s bombed the Moosbierbaum oil refinery. |
| January 1945 | Salzbergen | The Wintershell [sic] "straight crude oil refinery with a small cracking plant" was bombed. |
| February 1, 1945 | Vienna (Moosbierbaum) | A visual attack by 300+ B-17s and B-24s bombed the oil refinery. |
| February 2/3, 1945 | Wanne-Eickel | 323 aircraft attacked the Wanne-Eickel oil refinery(Krupp Treibstoffwerke). Most bombs hit open ground around the Shamrock 3/4 coal mine. |
| February 3/4, 1945 | Bottrop | The "PROSPER Benzol Plant" was bombed. |
| February 3/4, 1945 | Dortmund | The Hansa coking plant was bombed. A later RAF Dortmund raid on March 12 was the heaviest World War II raid on a city in Europe (1108 aircraft). |
| February 3, 1945 | Magdeburg/Rothensee | Mission 817: 116 B-24s bombed the Rothensee oil plant (246 bombed the marshalling yard). |
| February 4, 1945 | Gelsenkirchen (Nordstern) | The 466th bombed the "NORDSTERN Benzol Plant". |
| February 4, 1945 | Oberhausen (Osterfeld) | The Oberhausen "OSTERFELD Benzol Plant" was bombed. |
| February 5, 1945 | Regensburg | 730+ B-17s and B-24s bombed oil storage at Regensburg. |
| February 4/5, 1945 | Gelsenkirchen (Nordstern) | 96 Halifaxes, 12 Lancasters, and 12 Mosquitoes attacked the Nordstern synthetic-oil plant. Most of the bombs fell south of the target. |
| February 7, 1945 | Leipzig/Böhlen | The 447 BG bombed the Böhlen "oil refinery". |
| February 7, 1945 | Wanne-Eickel | 74 Lancasters bombed in the wintry conditions which had scattered the force. |
| February 7, 1945 | Kagran | The oil refinery was bombed. |
| February 7, 1945 | Korneuburg | The oil refinery was bombed. |
| February 7, 1945 | Vienna (Floridsdorf) | The oil refinery was bombed. |
| February 7, 1945 | Vienna (Lobau) | The 32 BS bombed the Lobau oil refinery. |
| February 7, 1945 | Vienna (Moosbierbaum) | The oil refinery was bombed. |
| February 7, 1945 | Vienna (Schwechat) | The Schwechat oil refinery was bombed. |
| February 7, 1945 | Pola | The 485 BG bombed the oil storage at Pola. |
| February 7/8, 1945 | Mestre | Fighters and fighter-bombers supporting U.S. Fifth Army forces in the Serchio river valley destroyed an oil dump north of Mestre. |
| February 8/9, 1945 | Pölitz | 477 aircraft in 2 waves caused severe damage. The Pölitz plant was captured April 26, 1945. |
| February 8/9, 1945 | Wanne-Eickel | 200 Halifaxes, 20 Mosquitoes, and 8 Lancasters conducted scattered bombing with only light damage to the oil refinery. |
| February 8/9, 1945 | Vienna (Moosbierbaum) | 49 aircraft bombed the oil refinery. |
| February 9, 1945 | Lützkendorf | Mission 824: 233 B-17s bombed the "oil plant at Lützkendorf between Leipzig and Halle". |
| February 9, 1945 | Magdeburg/Rothensee | Mission 824: 10 B-24s bombed the oil plant and 268 using H2X hit the secondary target, the Magdeburg marshalling yard. |
| February 9, 1945 | Dülmen | Mission 824: 107 of 152 B-17s using Micro H to bomb "an oil storage depot at Dülmen" |
| February 10, 1945 | Dülmen | Mission 825: 140 B-17s hit the secondary target, the Dülmen oil storage depot, using Micro H. |
| February 11, 1945 | Dülmen | Mission 827: 124 of 127 B-24s attack the Dülmen oil depot using Micro H. |
| February 13, 1945 | Leipzig/Böhlen | The 384 BG bombed the synthetic oil plant. |
| February 13/14, 1945 | Hanover (Deurag-Nerag) | Bomb damaged was repaired by February 26. |
| February 13/14, 1945 | Leipzig/Böhlen | A diversion raid for the Bombing of Dresden, 360 Lancasters and Halifaxes bombed the Braunkohle-Benzin synthetic-oil plant at Böhlen 60 miles (97 km) from Dresden. |
| February 13/14, 1945 | ^{[Expand]} | As diversion raids for the Bombing of Dresden, de Havilland Mosquitoes bombed Magdeburg (71), Bonn (16), Misburg near Hanover (8), and Dortmund (6). |
| February 13/14, 1945 | Nuremberg/Würzburg area | Bombing of the Siemens-Schuckert electrical transformer plant in Nuremberg (the largest in the world), ignited the oil tanks. Bombing destroyed the transformer plant c. February 1945. |
| February 14, 1945 | Dülmen | Mission 830: 35 aircraft bombed the Dülmen oil depot. |
| February 14, 1945 | Vienna (Floridsdorf) | |
| February 14, 1945 | Vienna (Lobau) | The Lobau oil refinery was bombed. |
| February 14, 1945 | Vienna (Moosbierbaum) | 500+ B-24s, B-17s and P-38s bombed the Moosbierbaum oil refinery. |
| February 14, 1945 | Vienna (Schwechat) | The Schwechat oil refinery was bombed. |
| February 15, 1945 | Cottbus | The 447 BG The 447 BG bombed the Cottbus "oil refinery". Cottbus was also bombed on March 17. |
| February 14/15, 1945 | Leipzig/Rositz | Operation Thunderclap: 224 Lancasters and 8 Mosquitoes bombed the oil refinery in Rositz near Leipzig, causing damage to the southern part of the plant. |
| February 15, 1945 | Leipzig/Böhlen | Mission 832 |
| February 15, 1945 | Magdeburg | Mission 832 bombed the Magdeburg oil facility(ies). |
| February 15, 1945 | Ruhland-Schwarzheide | Mission 832 |
| February 15, 1945 | Korneuburg | |
| February 16, 1945 | Dortmund | Mission 833: 78 B-17s bombed the Harpenerweg [sic] synthetic oil plant at Bochum-Langendeer, 112 bombed the Kaiserstuhl coking plant, and the 92 BG bombed the "Hoesch Benzol coking plant". The small Dortmund/Harpenerweg "refinery" had begun partial production c. February 6. |
| February 16, 1945 | Gelsenkirchen (Nordstern) | Mission 833: 104 B-17s bombed Nordstern. |
| February 16, 1945 | Dortmund (Minster stein) | Mission 833: 112 B-17s bombed the oil refinery at Minsterstein. [sic] By February 2, 1945, "Minster stein" had been conducting "at least partial production". |
| February 16, 1945 | Salzbergen | 46 B-24s bombed the Salzbergen oil refinery. |
| February 17, 1945 | Linz | The 32 BS bombed the Linz benzol plant. A Linz target was also bombed by the 464 BG on January 20 and April 25, 1945. |
| February 19, 1945 | Alm | Mission 835: 37 B-17s bombed the Alm oil refinery. |
| February 19, 1945 | Bochum | Mission 835: 99 B-17s bombed the Carolinenglück synthetic oil plant. |
| February 19, 1945 | Dortmund | Mission 835: 74 B-17s bombed the Hoesch-Benzin GmbH synthetic oil plant. |
| February 19, 1945 | Gelsenkirchen (Alma Pluto) | Mission 835: 37 B-17s bombed the Alma Pluto coking plant. |
| February 19, 1945 | Gelsenkirchen (Scholven/Buer) | Mission 835: 36 B-17s bombed the Scholven synthetic oil plant. |
| February 20, 1945 | Vienna (Schwechat) | Schwechat oil refinery bombed. |
| February 20, 1945 | Vienna (Lobau) | The Lobau refinery and Floridsdorf railyard were bombed. "The attack was outstandingly successful, resulting in severe damage to the boiler house, virtual destruction of the distillation unit pump house, a probable hit on the fractionating tower, and serious damage to tankage and rail sidings. |
| February 20/21, 1945 | Düsseldorf-Reisholz | 173 aircraft attacked the Rhenania Ossag refinery at Düsseldorf-Reisholz, halting all oil production. |
| February 20/21, 1945 | Monheim am Rhein | 128 aircraft bombed the Rhenania Ossag refinery at Monheim. |
| February 21, 1945 | Worms | The 466th bombed the "Worms Oil Plant". |
| February 21, 1945 | | A German oil storage depot was bombed. |
| February 19, 1945 | Gelsenkirchen (Alma Pluto) | 85 Lancasters bombed the Alma Pluto coking plant. |
| February 22, 1945 | Oberhausen (Osterfeld) | 82 Lancasters accurately bombed oil refineries at Osterfeld during Operation Clarion. |
| February 24, 1945 | Hamburg-Harburg refineries | Mission 845: At Hamburg, 278 B-17s bombed the Albrecht oil refinery and 70 bombed the Harburg oil refineries. 383 B-17s are sent to hit the Deschimag U-boat yards at Bremen (200) and the Bremen W rail bridge (134). The 92 BG bombed the Albrecht synthetic oil complex. |
| February 24, 1945 | Kamen | 340 aircraft bombed a "synthetic-oil plant in Bergkamen, just north of Kamen" using Oboe and H2S markers. |
| February 25, 1945 | Munich | Mission 847: 174 B-17s bombed the oil storage tanks and marshalling yard at Munich. Munich also had a Metzler tire plant. |
| February 25, 1945 | Kamen | 153 No. 3 Group RAF Lancasters carried out a G-H attack on the synthetic-oil refinery at Kamen. |
| February 25, 1945 | Linz | The 485 BG bombed the benzol plant. The Third Army entered Linz and Salzburg on May 4 after the Fifteenth Air Force had dropped 8,962 tons of explosives on Linz. |
| February 25, 1945 | Neuberg | The 487 BG bombed the Neuberg underground oil depot. Neuberg also had aircraft service/park facilities, and Neuburg am Donau (Zell) had an Me 262 production facility. |
| February 26, 1945 | Dortmund benzol plant | 149 Lancasters bombed the "Hoesch-Benzin GmbH benzol-oil plant" using G-H. |
| February 27/28, 1945 | Wilhelmshaven | Mission 851: 23 B-24s bombed Wilhelmshaven oil storage by PFF. |
| February 28, 1945 | Gelsenkirchen (Nordstern) | 156 Lancasters bombed Nordstern using G-H. |
| February 28, 1945 | Frankfurt oil depot | Frankfurt/Main oil storage tanks were bombed. |
| February 1945 | Germany | Total POL production was down 27% from the production prior to the January raids. Stocks of aviation fuel were down to 6,000 tonnes and in February, the Luftwaffe received only 400 tonnes: "anyone using [German] fuel for purposes other than the immediate conduct of operation will be considered a saboteur and court-martialed without mercy" (military order). |
| March 1, 1945 | Vienna (Moosbierbaum) | 22 P-38s bombed the Moosbierbaum refinery and Tulln marshalling yard. Vienna also had aircraft service/park facilities at Tulln and Aspern. |
| March 1, 1945 | Budapest & Nagykanizsa | After the Fifteenth Air Force had dropped 8,370 tons of explosives on Budapest targets, Budapest was captured February 13, 1945 (the Red Army was within 10 miles on November 3, 1944). On March 1, Germany launched the last major German offensive of World War II (Operation Frühlingserwachen) to retake Budapest and the Nagykanizsa oil fields south of Lake Balaton. |
| March 2, 1945 | Germany | Speer ordered that Nitrogen plants were to be repaired before the hydrogenation plants. |
| March 2, 1945 | Chemnitz | Mission 859: 255 B-17s bombed Chemnitz. |
| March 2, 1945 | Dresden | Mission 859: The 447 BG bombed the oil refinery at Dresden. |
| March 2, 1945 | Magdeburg/Rothensee | Mission 859: 24 B-17s bombed the Rothensee oil plant |
| March 2, 1945 | Leipzig/Böhlen | Mission 859: 96 B-17s bombed the oil plant and gun batteries at Böhlen. |
| March 2, 1945 | Leipzig/Rositz (Altenburg) | Mission 859: The 384 BG bombed the oil plant at Rositz near Altenburg. An Altenburg target was also bombed on March 17. |
| March 2, 1945 | Ruhland-Schwarzheide | Mission 859: 24 B-17s bombed the Ruhland oil plant. |
| March 3, 1945 | Brunswick | The 447 BG bombed the chemical plant at Brunswick. Brunswick also had a Büssing-Nag truck plant. |
| March 1 & 4, 1945 | Kamen | The chemical works at Bergkamen were bombed. The 466th bombed Kamen on March 3. |
| March 4, 1945 | Wanne-Eickel | 128 aircraft bombed. |
| March 5, 1945 | Gelsenchirchen (Consolidation) | 170 aircraft bombed the Consolidation coking plant at Gelsenkirchen. |
| March 6, 1945 | Salzbergen | The Wintershall oil refinery was bombed. |
| March 7, 1945 | Castrop-Rauxel | The 487 BG bombed the oil refinery. |
| March 7, 1945 | Dortmund | At Dortmund, 24 aircraft bombed the Hörde Refuge Association coking plant and 62 bombed the Harpenerweg coking plant. The 466th also bombed Dortmund on March 12. |
| March 7, 1945 | Dates | The 447 BG bombed the "Datteln–Emscher Lippe" coking plant. |
| March 7/8, 1945 | Hamburg-Harburg refineries | Bomber Command attacked the oil refinery at Harburg. |
| March 7/8, 1945 | Hemmingstedt | 256 Halifaxes and 25 Lancasters of Nos 4, 6 and 8 Groups attempted to attack the Deutsche Erdöl-Aktiengesellschaft oil refinery at Hemmingstedt, near Heide, with little success. |
| March 8, 1945 | Bochum | 99 aircraft bombed the Robert Muser coking plant and 63 bombed the Bruchstraße coking plant. |
| March 8, 1945 | Bottrop (Mathias Stinnes) | 37 aircraft bombed the Mathias Stinnes coking plant. |
| March 8, 1945 | Dortmund | 110 aircraft bombed the Gneisenau coking plant. On March 10, 509 aircraft bombed the Verschiebebahnhöfe at Dortmund. |
| March 8, 1945 | Essen | In Essen, 114 aircraft bombed the Emil coking plant, and 109 bombed the marshalling yards. |
| March 8, 1945 | Gelsenchirchen (Scholven/Buer) | 75 aircraft bombed Scholven. |
| March 8, 1945 | Hüls | 111 aircraft bombed the Auguste Victoria coking plant at Marl-Hüls. |
| March 10, 1945 | Gelsenchirchen (Scholven/Buer) | 155 aircraft bombed Scholven. |
| March 11, 1945 | Bremen | The 384 BG bombed the Bremen oil plant. |
| March 11, 1945 | Hamburg-Harburg | The 486 BG bombed a Hamburg oil plant. |
| March 11/12, 1945 | Zagreb | The 596 BS attacked a synthetic ammunition filling plant at Zagreb. The Bergius process for synthetic oil production was also used for synthesizing ammonia for explosives. The small petrol refinery between Zagreb and Vrapče was named Sveta Klava, then Astra. |
| March 12, 1945 | Vienna (Floridsdorf) | B-24s and B-17s bombed the Floridsdorf oil refinery. |
| March 11, 1945 | Nienhagen | The 486 BG bombed a Nienhagen oil facility. |
| March 13, 1945 | Lützkendorf | The 106th bombed Lützkendorf. |
| March 13/14, 1945 | Gelsenchirchen (Consolidation) | 80 aircraft bombed the Consolidation coking plant. |
| March 13/14, 1945 | Herne | 82 aircraft bombed the Erin coking plant. |
| March 14, 1945 | Vienna | Prior to a raid targeting a Vienna oil refinery, the briefing officer told crews to avoid the St. Stephen's Cathedral, the Vienna State Opera, the Schönbrunn Palace and other historic buildings and schools. Due to weather, the alternate (Wiener Neustadt marshaling yards) was bombed. |
| March 14, 1945 | Dates | 50 aircraft bombed the Emscher-Lippe coking plant. |
| March 14, 1945 | Hattingen | 51 aircraft bombed the Henrichshütte coking plant. |
| March 14, 1945 | Szőny | The Szőny oil refinery was bombed. |
| March 14, 1945 | Almásfüzitő | The Almásfüzitő oil refinery was bombed. |
| March 15, 1945 | Bottrop-Welheim | 121 aircraft bombed the Ruhröl AG synthetic oil plant. |
| March 15, 1945 | Castrop-Rauxel | 119 aircraft bombed the Union Victor synthetic oil plant. |
| March 15, 1945 | Hanover (Deurag-Nerag) | The bombing caused an "indefinite shutdown". |
| March 15, 1945 | Ruhland-Schwarzheide | In the 15AF's deepest penetration into Germany, 109 B-17s bombed the oil refinery at Ruhland. |
| March 15, 1945 | Vienna (Floridsdorf) | The Floridsdorf` oil refinery was bombed. |
| March 15, 1945 | Vienna (Moosbierbaum) | The Moosbierbaum oil refinery was bombed. |
| March 15, 1945 | Vienna (Schwechat) | The Schwechat oil refinery was bombed. |
| March 15, 1945 | Kolín | 103 B-17s bombed the oil refinery as an alternate target. |
| March 16, 1945 | Vienna (Floridsdorf) | The Floridsdorf oil refinery was bombed. |
| March 16, 1945 | Korneuburg | The Korneuburg oil refinery was bombed. |
| March 16, 1945 | Vienna (Moosbierbaum) | The Moosbierbaum oil refinery was bombed. |
| March 16, 1945 | Vienna (Schwechat) | The Schwechat oil refinery was bombed. |
| March 17, 1945 | Dortmund | 77 aircraft bombed the Gneisenau coking plant. |
| March 17, 1945 | Hüls | 90 aircraft bombed the chemical works at Marl-Hüls. |
| March 17, 1945 | Leipzig/Böhlen | Mission 892: 152 B-17s bombed the oil refinery at Böhlen. |
| March 17, 1945 | Leipzig/Rötha | Mission 892: 127 B-17s bombed the oil refinery and power station at Mölbis (the 92 BG bombed the Mölbis benzol plant). A Mölbis target had been bombed on September 12 (Mission 626), and the 303 BG bombed the Mölbis thermal electric power station in Rötha on May 28. |
| March 17, 1945 | Ludwigshafen | Mission 892: 138 B-17s bombed their secondary target, the Bittefeld oil refinery. After the Eighth Air Force had dropped 17,796 tons of explosives on Ludwigshafen-Mannheim, Ludwigshafen was captured on March 21. |
| March 17, 1945 | Ruhland-Schwarzheide | Mission 892: 214 B-17s bombed the Ruhland oil refinery. |
| March 18, 1945 | Bochum | 75 aircraft bombed the Harpenweg coking plant. |
| 1945-03-18 | Bochum | 22 Lancasters bombed oil plants at Hattingen and Langendreer in Bochum. |
| March 18, 1945 | Hattingen | 78 aircraft bombed the Henrichshütte coking plant. |
| March 19, 1945 | Gelsenchirchen (Consolidation) | 79 aircraft bombed the Consolidation coking plant. |
| March 19, 1945 | Ruhland | The 486 BG bombed a Ruhland oil plant. |
| March 20, 1945 | Hamburg-Harburg | Mission 898: The 92 BG bombed a Harburg oil plant. |
| March 20, 1945 | Hemmingstedt | Mission 898: 114 B-24s attacked the oil refinery at Hemmingstedt. |
| March 20, 1945 | Kagran | The oil refinery was bombed. |
| March 20, 1945 | Korneuburg | The oil refinery was bombed. |
| March 20/21, 1945 | Hemmingstedt | 166 Lancasters attacked the Hemmingstedt oil refinery. |
| March 21, 1945 | Vienna | 3 oil refineries and a goods depot were bombed at Vienna. |
| March 21, 1945 | Vienna (Floridsdorf) | The 32 BS bombed. |
| March 21/22, 1945 | Bochum | 143 aircraft bombed the Harpenweg coking plant. |
| March 22, 1945 | Kralupy | The Kralupy oil refinery was bombed. |
| March 22, 1945 | Ruhland-Schwarzheide | The Ruhland oil refinery was bombed (some bombers dispatched to Ruhland bombed the Lauta aluminum works to the North). |
| March 22, 1945 | Vienna | Two Vienna oil refineries were bombed. |
| March 23, 1945 | Ruhland-Schwarzheide | The Ruhland oil refinery was bombed. |
| March 23, 1945 | Vienna | Vienna oil refinery(ies) bombed. After the Fifteenth Air Force had dropped 30,122 tons of explosives on Vienna targets, the Soviet Vienna Offensive began on April 2, encircled Vienna on April 7, and the garrison surrendered on April 13. |
| March 24, 1945 | Bochum | 95 aircraft bombed the Harpenweg coking plant. |
| March 25, 1945 | Bücken | Mission 913: 1,009 bombers and 341 fighters are dispatched to hit 7 oil plants and a tank factory. 57 B-24s bombed the Bücken oil depot. |
| March 25, 1945 | Ehmen | Mission 913: 59 B-24s bombed the Ehmen oil depot |
| March 25, 1945 | Nuremberg/Würzburg area | Erbach [sic], Germany, oil storage depot bombed. Erlbach was south of Ebrach between Würzburg and Nuremberg. |
| March 25, 1945 | Hitzacker | Mission 913: 127 B-24s bombed the Hitzacker oil depot. |
| March 25, 1945 | Neuenheerse | Neuenheerse, Germany, oil storage depot bombed. |
| March 25, 1945 | Zeitz | Mission 915: 185 B-17s are sent to hit the Zeitz synthetic oil plant. |
| March 27, 1945 | Bremen-Farge | 95 Lancasters of No 5 Group successfully attacked an oil-storage depot at Farge. |
| March 27, 1945 | Hamm | 150 aircraft bombed the Heessen coking plant in the last strategic bombing in the Ruhr Area. |
| March 28, 1945 | Dedenhausen | The 486 BG bombed a Dedenhausen oil facility near Hanover. |
| March 28, 1945 | Nuremberg/Würzburg area | The 596 BS bombed the Ebrach oil depot. Ebrach was north of Erlbach between Würzburg and Nuremberg. |
| March 30, 1945 | Ebenhausen | The Ebenhausen oil depot in Germany was bombed. |
| March 30, 1945 | Hamburg-Harburg refineries | 169 bombers attacked an oil depot at Hamburg, and the 487 BG bombed a Hamburg oil refinery. |
| March 31, 1945 | Bad Berka | Mission 920: 29 B-17s bombed the secondary target, the Bad Berka oil plant. The 100 BG attacked the Bad Berka oil storage. Bad Berka underground work plant used forced labor. |
| March 31, 1945 | Nuremberg/Würzburg area | B-17s bombed the Erbach [sic] oil depot. Erlbach was south of Ebrach between Würzburg and Nuremberg. |
| March 31, 1945 | Erfurt | Mission 920: 20 B-17s bombed the Erfurt oil depot. Erfurt had also been bombed on February 9 (by the 384 BG) and on March 17. |
| March 31, 1945 | Gotha | Mission 920: 20 B-17s bombed the Gotha oil plant as secondary target (Gotha also had an aircraft production center.) The Ohrdruf forced labor camp near Gotha was the 1st found by the Allies, and Eisenhower, Patton, and Bradley inspected the Ohrdruf Nord work camp on April 12, 1945. After an April 13/14 overnight visit with his father, John Eisenhower visited Buchenwald on April 14. |
| March 31, 1945 | Marienburg-Gdynia | B-17s bombed the Marienburg oil depot. Stalag XX-B was at Marienburg. |
| March 31, 1945 | Nuremberg/Würzburg area | B-17s bombed the Würzburg oil depot. |
| March 31, 1945 | Zeitz | Mission 920: 229 B-17s bombed the synthetic oil refinery at Zeitz using H2X radar |
| April 4, 1945 | Nuremberg/Würzburg area | The Ebrach oil depot was bombed. |
| April 7, 1945 | Buchen | 36 B-17s bombed the Buchen oil depot. |
| April 7, 1945 | Hitzacker | The 384 BG bombed the Hitzacker underground storage. |
| April 7/8, 1945 | Leipzig/Rötha | The bombing of the benzol plant at Molbis, near Leipzig, ceased all production at the plant. Halle and Leipzig were captured by the VII Corps on April 14. |
| April 8, 1945 | Durben | Mission 920: 31 B-17s bombed the Durben oil depot. |
| April 8, 1945 | Lützkendorf | The 106th bombed Lützkendorf. The US First Army was in Leipzig on April 18, 1945. |
| April 8, 1945 | Munchenbernsdorf | The Munchenbernsdorf oil storage depot was bombed. |
| April 8, 1945 | Po Valley | Oilfields in the central Po Valley were bombed. On April 20, US ground forces encountered "half-hearted resistance [in capturing the] flat ground of the Po Valley with its excellent road network". |
| April 8, 1945 | Nienhagen oil refinery | The Nienhagen oil refinery was bombed. |
| April 9, 1945 | Bad Berka | The 596 BS bombed the Bad Berka oil storage. |
| April 9, 1945 | Dedenhausen | The Dedenhausen oil target was bombed. |
| April 9, 1945 | Neuberg | Mission 935: 89 B-17s bombed the underground oil depot. |
| April 11, 1945 | Freiham | Mission 941: 300 B-17s bombed the Freiham oil depot. |
| April 11, 1945 | Regensburg | Mission 941: 80 B-24s bombed the Regensburg oil depot and 31 bombed the munitions depot.The 401 BG bombed a Regensburg target on April 16. The Fifteenth Air Force dropped 5,815 tons of explosives on Regensburg. |
| April 12, 1945 | United Kingdom | Strategic Bombing Directive No. 4 ended the strategic air war in Europe. On April 16, Spaatz notified Doolittle and Twining: "The advances of our ground forces have brought to a close the strategic air war waged by the United States Strategic Air Forces and the Royal Air Force Bomber Command.". |
| April 18, 1945 | Neuburg | Oil storage at Neuburg an der Donau was bombed. |
| April 18, 1945 | Roudnice | 115 B-17s bombed the Roudnice nad Labem oil storage and marshalling yards. |
| April 19, 1945 | Annaburg | Oil storage was bombed at Annaburg. |
| April 19, 1945 | Deggendorf | Oil storage was bombed at Deggendorf. |
| April 24, 1945 | Schrobenhausen | The oil depot was bombed at Schrobenhausen. |
| April 25/26, 1945 | Tønsberg | During the RAF's "last major strategic raid", 107 Lancasters destroyed the small "Vallo-Taneberg" oil refinery at Tønsberg. |
| April 1945 | | Germany's oil production was 5% that of the previous year: Jan - Feb - Mar - Apr 1945 tbd - tbd - tbd - c. 7,000 tons/month By the end of the war, instead of using "200 liters of J-2 fuel taxiing for 5 minutes," Me 262 jet fighters were towed by oxen or Kettenkrad track-cycles to save fuel. "General Carl Spaatz had been insistent—and correct. The enemy would fight for oil, and the enemy would lose his fighters, his crews, and his fuel" (Herman S. Wolk, USAF historian, June 1974) |
| May 10, 1945 | | Harry S. Truman signed Joint Chiefs of Staff Directive 1067, which prohibited German production of oil until superseded in July 1947. |

== Notes ==
Notes

Citations
