= Schwarzheide =

Schwarzheide Carny Gózd
- Town
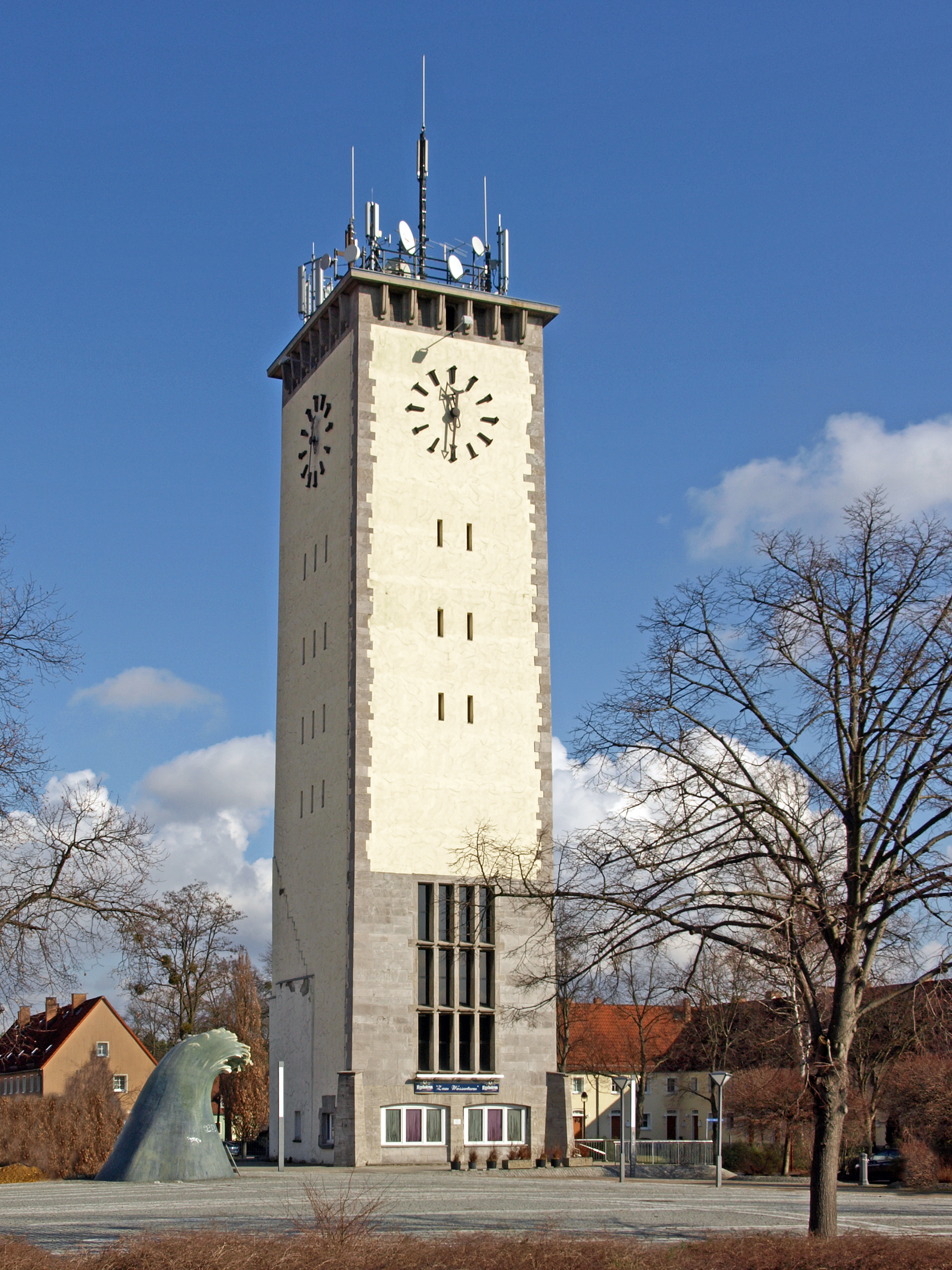

- Coat of arms

- Location of Schwarzheide; Carny Gózd within Oberspreewald-Lausitz district
- Interactive map of Schwarzheide; Carny Gózd
- Location within Germany Location within Brandenburg
- Coordinates: 51°28′59″N 13°52′00″E
- Country: Germany
- State: Brandenburg
- District: Oberspreewald-Lausitz

Government
  - Mayor (2016–24): Christoph Schmidt (Ind.)

Area
  - Total: 33.44 km^{2} (12.91 sq mi)
- Elevation: 99 m (325 ft)

Population (2025-12-31)
  - Total: 5,675
  - Density: 169.7/km^{2} (439.5/sq mi)
- Time zone: UTC+01:00 (CET)
  - Summer (DST): UTC+02:00 (CEST)
- Postal codes: 01987
- Dialling codes: 035752
- Vehicle registration: OSL (until 1994 SFB)
- Website: www.schwarzheide.de

Schwarzheide (German pronunciation: [ˈʃvaʁtsˌhaɪdə]; Lower Sorbian: Carny Gózd) is a town in the Oberspreewald-Lausitz district, in Lower Lusatia, Brandenburg, Germany. It is situated on the river Schwarze Elster, 11 km southwest of Senftenberg, 110 km south of Berlin and 40 km north of Dresden. The little river Pössnitz runs through the eastern part of Schwarzheide.

== Neighbouring communities ==
Immediate neighbors of the town are the towns Ruhland (south), Lauchhammer (west), Schipkau (north) and Senftenberg with the district Brieske (east).

== Districts ==
Schwarzheide has the following districts

- Schwarzheide-West (former Zschornegosda)
- Wandelhof
- Schwarzheide-Mitte
- Schwarzheide-Ost, consisting of Victoria and Naundorf

== History ==
The town's landmark is the watertower. Today´s industrial town, Schwarzheide, was created on October 1, 1936, from the independent communities, Zschornegosda (today Schwarzheide-West) and Naundorf (now part of Schwarzheide-Ost). The name was translated from the Sorbian name, "Zschornegosda", (čorny = black, gozd = heath, wood). The date of foundation of this community is unknown. Zschornegosda and Naundorf were founded in the 12th or the 13th century after the Christianization of the Sorbs.

The first written evidence of Naundorf (as Nuwendorff) came from a pledge deed from 1421. Zschornegosda was first written in 1449 (as Cschörnegast) in the feudal deed of Duke Frederick II, Elector of Saxony. Naundorf is a typical street village. Zschornegosda is a rotunde called okolnica. The chapel was on the highest point of a sandy knoll.

The development of both villages was retarded by wars, fires, and epidemics. Until the 18th century, the villages had no more than 100 inhabitants.

In 1780, the discovery of lignite coal west of Zschornegosda in Bockwitz led to mining and the foundation of briquette factories (Ferdinand, Victoria, Victoria II). The river, Schwarze Elster, was drained and converted to a canal, so it was no longer possible to live from fishing. Highway A13 was built in 1936.

World War II
In 1937, Brabag (German: Braunkohlen Benzin AG) completed the Brabag II facility in Ruhland-Schwarlheide (the 4th Nazi Germany Fischer-Tropsch plant) to produce gasoline and diesel fuel from lignite coal. The plant was a target of the Oil Campaign of World War II, used Sachsenhausen concentration camp forced labor, and became a post-war Soviet Joint Stock Company. The factory became VEB Synthesewerk Schwarzheide on January 1, 1954.

When the village's population reached eight-thousand inhabitants, the village became a town on January 11, 1967.

After 1990, Synthesewerk Schwarzheide became a part of BASF AG, which manufactures polyurethane.

=== Political affinity ===
The river, Schwarze Elster, forms the border between Lower and Upper Lusatia. From 1635, both Zschornegosda and Naundorf were part of the Electorate of Saxony. In 1815 both villages became a part of Prussia because of the Congress of Vienna. From 1815 to 1947, they were part of the Prussian Province of Brandenburg. Between 1818 and 1952, Zschornegosda and Naundorf were part of Kreis Calau. From 1952 to 1990, Schwarzheide was a part of Kreis Senftenberg in the Bezirk Cottbus of East Germany.

In 1990, town was annexed to Brandenburg, and, on December 6, 1993, to Oberspreewald-Lausitz.

=== Parliament ===
The town parliament of Schwarzheide is composed of the mayor and 18 members.

- Christian Democratic Union 5 seats (27.3%)
- Freie Wählergruppe Schwarzheide 4 seats (22.3%)
- Social Democratic Party 3 seats (18.2%)
- The Left 3 seats (17.0%)
- Free Democratic Party 3 seats (15.2%)

The turnout stood at 56,9 percent.

=== Partnerships ===
- Krosno Odrzańskie (Poland)
- Karcag (Hungary)
- Piano di Sorrento (Italy)

== Demography ==
Development of Population since 1875 within the Current Boundaries (Blue Line: Population; Dotted Line: Comparison to Population Development of Brandenburg state; Grey Background: Time of Nazi rule; Red Background: Time of Communist rule)

Recent Population Development and Projections (Population Development before Census 2011 (blue line); Recent Population Development according to the Census in Germany in 2011 (blue bordered line); Official projections for 2005-2030 (yellow line); for 2017-2030 (scarlet line); for 2020-2030 (green line)

Schwarzheide: Population development
within the current boundaries (2020)

Year	Pop.	±% p.a.
1875	983	—
1890	1,175	+1.20%
1910	2,145	+3.06%
1925	3,638	+3.58%
1939	5,898	+3.51%
1950	8,287	+3.14%
1964	8,169	−0.10%

Year	Pop.	±% p.a.
1971	8,570	+0.69%
1981	9,920	+1.47%
1985	9,262	−1.70%
1990	8,936	−0.71%
1995	7,881	−2.48%
2000	7,203	−1.78%
2005	6,555	−1.87%

Year	Pop.	±% p.a.
2010	6,053	−1.58%
2015	5,795	−0.87%
2016	5,711	−1.45%
2017	5,679	−0.56%
2018	5,652	−0.48%
2019	5,635	−0.30%
2020	5,568	−1.19%

== Culture and art ==
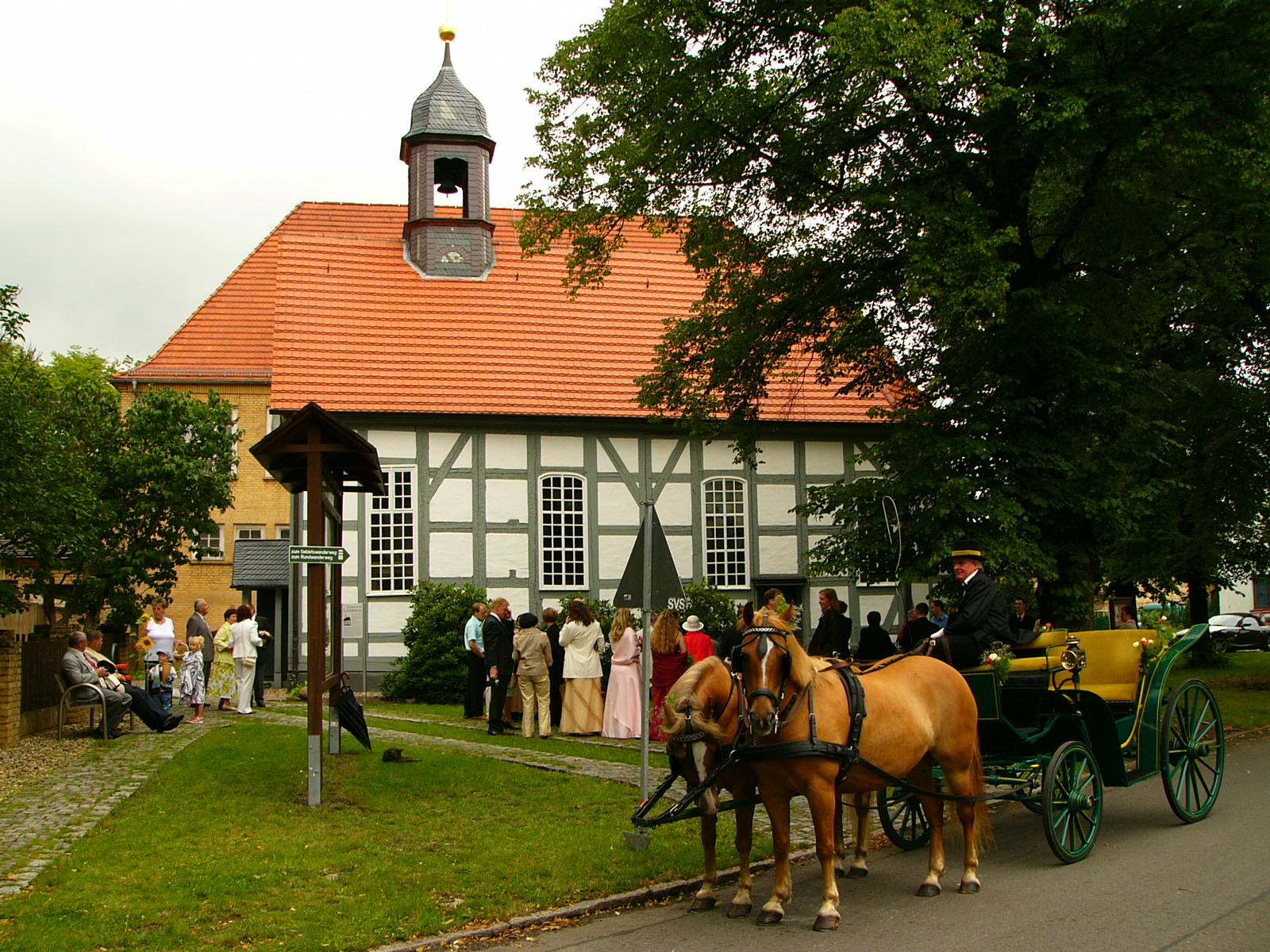
Die denkmalgeschützte Lutherkirche

Symbol is the 36 m high water tower built in 1943/44 by French prisoners of war. Lutherkirche from 1754 is also located in the center. The oldest nightclub in eastern Germany is Freizeitpark Wandelhof and there is also a cinema with four separate screens and 650 seats.

=== Museums ===
- Kulturhaus of BASF (Schipkauer Straße)
- Museum of Schwarzheide (Dorfaue)

=== Historical monuments ===
- Memorial for the victims of the concentration camp
- Monument from 1965 on cemetery Schwarzheide-West for more than 23 unfree workers Brabag victims

=== Buildings ===
- Evangelical church (1953 first new church in the GDR, Otto-Nuschke-Straße)
- Lutheran church (Schwarzheide)
- Evangelical chapel (Parkstraße)
- Catholic Holy Cross church (Otto-Nuschke-Straße)

=== Nature and recreation areas ===
Pine forests, lakes, meadows, and pastures surround Schwarzheide. The Lusatian Lake District and Spreewald are also near Schwarzheide.

=== Sports ===
Eurospeedway Lausitz is near.

== Infrastructure ==
=== Transport ===
Federal highway 13 Bundesautobahn 13 from Berlin to Dresden, in south B 169. There is a rail way point in Schwarzheide-Ost.

==== Street ====
A 13 (E 55): Berlin–Dresden (Anschlussstelle (16) Schwarzheide and Anschlussstelle (17) Ruhland)

==== Railway ====
RE 18: Falkenberg (Elster)–Bad Liebenwerda–Lauchhammer–Ruhland–Schwarzheide-Ost–Senftenberg–Drebkau–Cottbus

=== Companies ===
The largest employer is BASF Schwarzheide GmbH, and the company is building a battery supply plant. Other companies include Fränkische Rohrwerke and PeinigerRöRo.

=== Media ===
- Local broadcasting Schwarzheide & Ruhland

=== Education ===
In Schwarzheide there is a secondary school (Schwarzheide-Wandelhof), a high school (Emil-Fischer), a division of Oberstufenzentrums Lausitz (OSZ) to train laboratory technicians and chemistss, and a music school.

== Important persons ==
=== Honored ===
- 2002: Hans-Herman Dehmel (chief executive officer of BASF Schwarzheide from 1990 to 1995)
- 2004: Sokratis Giapapas (chief of Fränkisch Rohrwerke in Schwarzheide)
