= List of subcamps of Sachsenhausen =

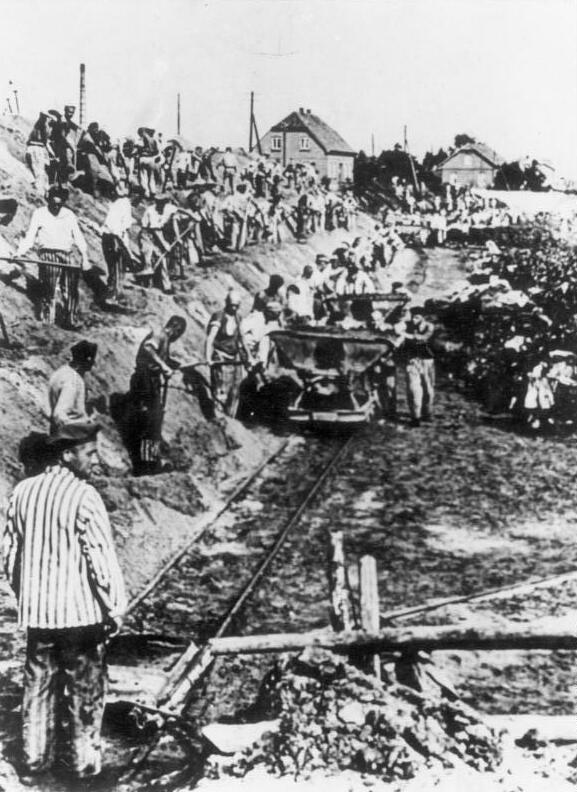
Sachsenhausen, brickworks

The following is a list of subcamps of the Sachsenhausen concentration camp established by Nazi Germany. The main camp, with around 50 barracks for slave-labour prisoners, was located 35 kilometres (22 mi) from Berlin, and operated between 1938 and April 22, 1945. During World War II the prisoners included Germans, Poles, Soviet POWs, Roma, and later Jews. It is estimated that the number of victims of Sachsenhausen was 30,000–35,000. Dozens of subcamps of Sachsenhausen existed directly in the capital city, serving individual business operators and factories.

There are indications that the concentration camp in Pustków, located within the SS-Truppenübungsplatz Heidelager military complex in southeast Poland, was another subsidiary of Sachsenhausen. The Pustków camp reportedly followed the Sachsenhausen blueprint, it was guarded until 1942 by the SS-Totenkopf battalion "Oranienburg" sent directly from Sachsenhausen (commanded by SS Hauptsturmführer Otto von und zu der Tann and SS Hauptsturmführer Bormann), and it was to Sachsenhausen that the survivors from Pustków were evacuated in July 1944. However, researchers at the Sachsenhausen Memorial and Museum have not been able to confirm the relationship between the two camps.

== Sub-camps ==
1. Bad Saarow
2. Beerfelde in Steinhöfel
3. Berlin Arado-Werke (Preußen/Berlin, Arado-Werke/Flugzeugwerke)
4. Berlin-Hakenfelde (Preußen/Berlin, Luftfahrtgerätewerk/Siemens), 1,000 women
5. Berlin-Halensee (Preußen/Berlin, DEMAG)
6. Berlin-Haselhorst Siemensstadt (Preußen/Berlin, Siemens/Schuckertwerke AG), 700 women
7. Berlin-Haselhorst Siemensstadt (Preußen/Berlin, Siemens/Schuckertwerke AG), 1,400 men
8. Berlin Kastanienallee (Preußen/Berlin, Waffen-SS), 150 men
9. Berlin-Köpenick (Preußen/Berlin, Kabelwerk Oberspree der AEG), 1,200 women
10. Berlin-Köpenick (Preußen/Berlin, Kabelwerk Oberspree der AEG), men
11. Berlin-Lichtenrade (Preußen/Berlin, Luftschutzbauten / Feuerlöschteichen), men
12. Berlin-Lichterfelde (Preußen/Berlin, Reichssicherheitshauptamt), 1,500 men
13. Berlin-Mariendorf (Preußen/Berlin, Maschinenbau-Henschel), 650 women
14. Berlin-Marienfelde
15. Berlin-Moabit
16. Berlin-Moabit (Friedrich-Krause-Ufer)
17. Berlin-Müggelheim
18. Berlin-Neukölln
19. Berlin-Niederschöneweide
20. Berlin-Reinickendorf
21. Berlin-Spandau
22. Berlin-Südende
23. Berlin-Tegel
24. Berlin-Tegel
25. Berlin-Wilmersdorf
26. Berlin-Wilmersdorf (Kommandoamt der Waffen-SS)
27. Berlin-Zehlendorf
28. Berlin-Zehlendorf
29. Bernau bei Berlin
30. Biesenthal
31. Börnicke in Nauen
32. Brandenburg an der Havel
33. Brüx
34. Döberitz in Dallgow-Döberitz
35. Drögen-Niendorf
36. Falkenhagen in Falkensee
37. Fürstenwalde
38. Fasterweide (?)
39. Genshagen in Ludwigsfelde
40. Glau in Trebbin
41. Groß Rosen (initially a subcamp, became its own camp in 1941)
42. Hohenlychen in Lychen
43. Karlsruhe in Plattenburg
44. Kleinmachnow
45. Königs Wusterhausen
46. Kolpin
47. Küstrin
48. Lieberose
49. Lübben
50. Müggelheim in Berlin
51. Neubrandenburg
52. Neudamm
53. KZ Neuengamme (initially a subcamp, became its own camp in 1940)
54. Oranienburg (early camp, replaced by KZ Sachsenhausen; re-established in 1943)
55. Pölitz
56. Prettin
57. Rathenow
58. Riga
59. Schönwalde-Glien
60. Schwarzheide
61. Senftenberg
62. Storkow
63. Stuttgart
64. Syrets (near Babi Yar, Kyiv; intended to be a subcamp)
65. Tettenborn
66. Treuenbrietzen (was a subcamp of Ravensbrück until 1944)
67. Usedom (Peenemünde, V-2 rocket production plant)
68. Werder
69. Wewelsburg (initially a subcamp, became its own camp in 1941, then became a subcamp of Buchenwald in 1943)
70. Wittenberg

Construction labor commandos that detained Poles

1. Baubrigade 1
2. Baubrigade 8
3. Baubrigade 9
4. Baubrigade 10
5. Baubrigade 12
6. Baubrigade I
7. Baubrigade II
8. Baubrigade V
9. Baubrigade XIII

== See also ==
- List of Nazi-German concentration camps
- Subcamp (SS)
