= Brabag =

Industrial consortium operating in WWII Germany

Brabag (Braunkohle Benzin AG) was a German firm, planned in 1933, and operating from 1934 until 1945, that distilled synthetic fuel (aviation fuel, diesel fuel, gasoline), lubricants, and paraffin wax from lignite. It was an industrial cartel firm closely supervised by the Nazi regime; while it operated, it produced commodities vital to the German military forces before and during World War II. After substantial damage from strategic bombing, the firm and its remaining assets were dissolved at the end of the war.

== History ==
Brabag, sometimes called 'BRABAG', is a portmanteau acronym (German: Braunkohlen Benzin AG) denoting the firm's chief inputs and outputs: brown coal (lignite) and gasoline ('benzine').

Upon the ramp-up of the Nazi program of industrial autarky that marked the approach of war, Berlin saw that one of its weakest points was the almost complete absence of crude oil production within German borders; this insight coincided with the emergence in both Hitler's Chancellery and the General Staff of a belief in a blitzkrieg war-fighting strategy that centered on Panzer warfare, buttressed by warplanes carrying out tactical air support. This strategy needed synthetic petroleum products.

Berlin therefore, in October 1934, ordered the German chemical conglomerate I.G. Farben to join with a cartel of lignite mineowners and other firms to invest 100.0 million Reichsmarks as an initial tranche of venture capital; these funds were used to set up a new firm, Brabag. The new firm was ordered to distill gasoline and other synthetic petroleum products, of which Germany had very little, from lignite, of which the Germans had an ample supply. Chemists had invented the Bergius process and the Fischer-Tropsch process to accomplish this goal.

Soon plants were built. In 1937, for example, Brabag completed the Brabag II facility in Ruhland-Schwarlheide (the 4th Nazi Germany Fischer-Tropsch plant) to produce gasoline and diesel fuel from lignite coal.

=== Forced labor ===
As Germany deepened its commitment to World War II, Brabag's plants became vital elements of the war effort. Like other strategic firms under the Nazi regime, Brabag was assigned a significant quota of forced labor of conscripts from the occupied nations. One estimate counts 13,000 Nazi concentration camp laborers working for Brabag. Brabag plants were a target of the Oil Campaign of World War II. Production of synthetic petroleum products had been severely damaged by the end of the war in 1945.
