= General Dynamics F-16 Fighting Falcon operators =

List of military aircraft users

Current operators Former operators Future operators

The F-16 Fighting Falcon was manufactured from General Dynamics from 1974 to 1993, Lockheed Corporation from 1993 to 1995, and since 1995, it has been manufactured by Lockheed Martin. The United States Air Force (USAF), four of its NATO partners, and the Pakistan Air Force (PAF), a major non-NATO US ally, are the primary operators of the aircraft. With the evolution of sales under Foreign Military Sales (FMS) contracts, many other air forces have also acquired and use F-16s.

Many air forces seek to replace aging inventories with F-16s. Because the USAF has steadily upgraded its F-16 inventory, it will sometimes sell older aircraft it considers obsolete as military surplus Excess Defense Articles (EDAs) or as knock-down kits to supplement spare parts.

== United States operators ==
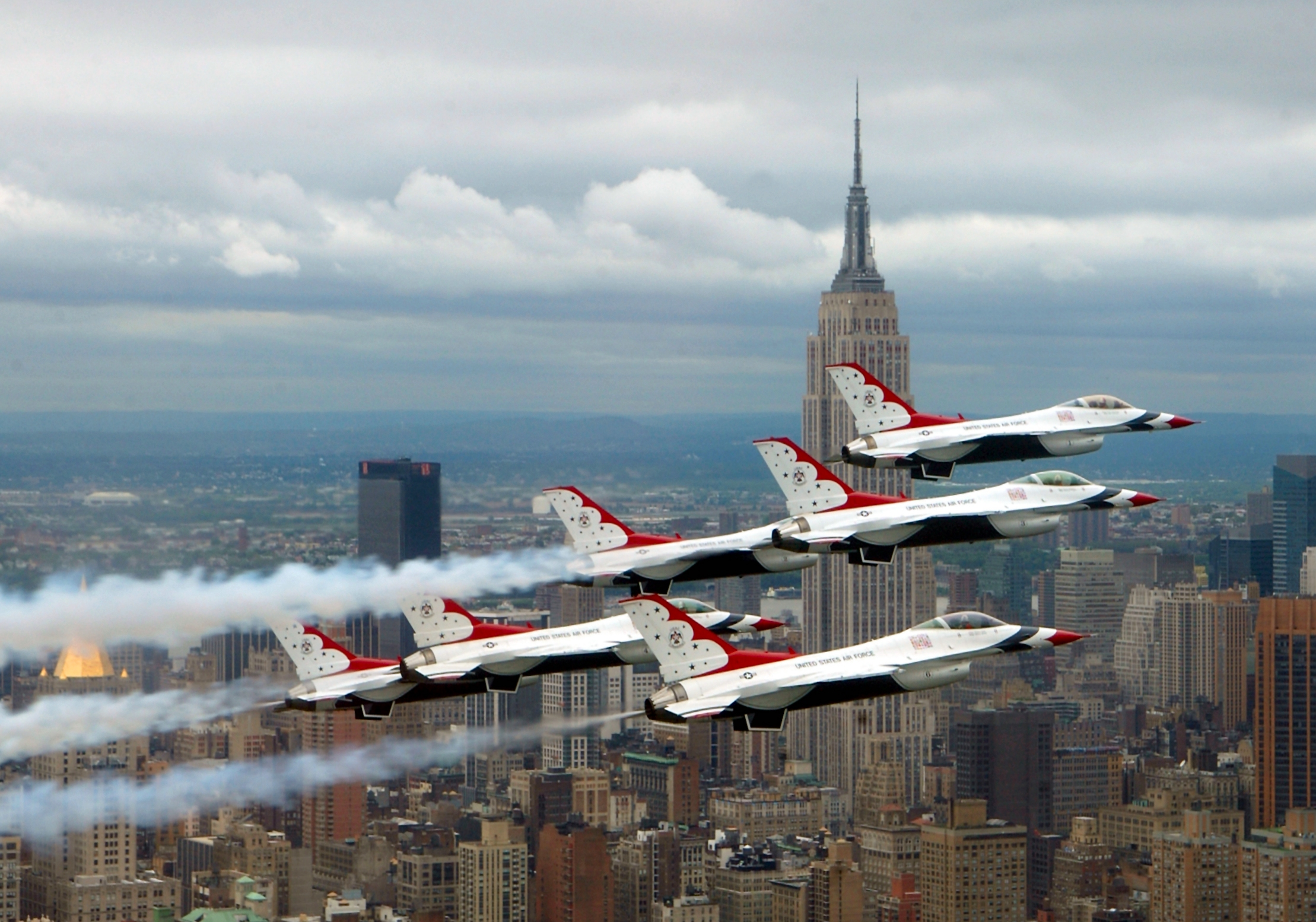
USAF Thunderbirds over New York City

Several commands of the United States Air Force (USAF) as well as the United States Navy (USN) and National Aeronautics and Space Administration (NASA) use various models of the F-16 Fighting Falcon.

=== United States Air Force ===
In 2007 the USAF operated 1,245 F-16s with 701 with active forces, 490 with Air National Guard and 54 with Reserve. These were broken down to 1 F-16A Block 15, 197 F-16C/D Block 25, 350 F-16C/D Block 30, 51 F-16C/D Block 32, 222 F-16C/D Block 40, 174 F-16C/D Block 42, 198 F-16C/D Block 50, 52 F-16C/D Block 52. The USAF service branch has received a total of 2,231 F-16s to its arsenal. As of 2023, the USAF operates a total of 841 F-16s of different variants.

==== Air Combat Command ====
Air Combat Command (ACC) is the descendant of the merger of the Tactical Air Command (TAC) and Strategic Air Command (SAC). ACC is the primary combat aircraft operator of the United States Air Force. Originally, all new F-16s would be delivered to TAC or ACC and then transferred to other commands, but now aircraft are often delivered directly to the other commands.

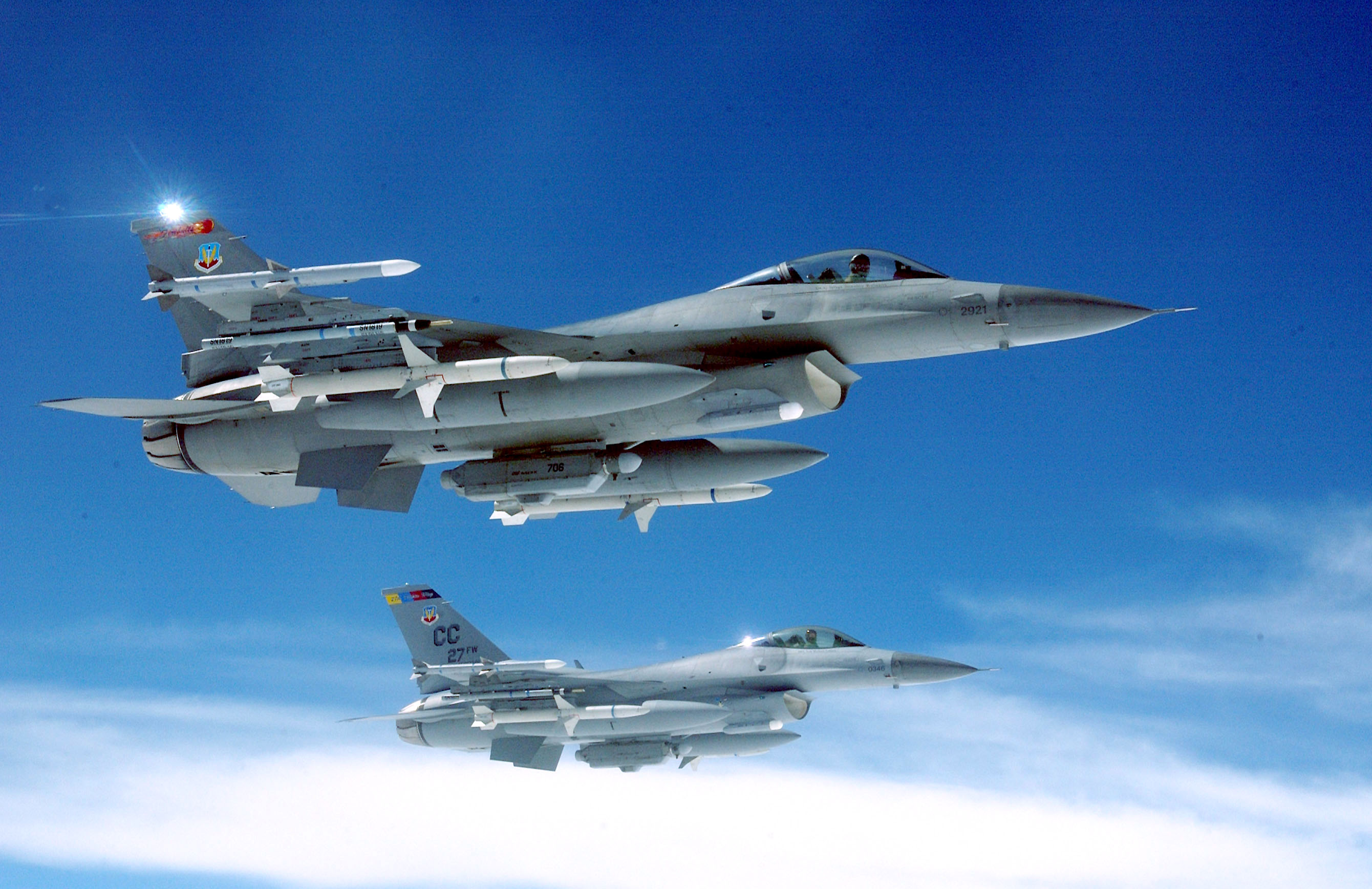
A pair of F-16C Fighting Falcons, assigned to the 27th Fighter Wing

- 20th Fighter Wing - Shaw AFB, South Carolina
  - 55th Fighter Squadron
  - 77th Fighter Squadron
  - 79th Fighter Squadron
- 53d Wing - Eglin AFB, Florida
  - 85th Test and Evaluation Squadron
  - 422d Test and Evaluation Squadron, Nellis AFB, Nevada
- 57th Wing - Nellis AFB, Nevada
  - 16th Weapons Squadron
  - 64th Aggressor Squadron
  - United States Air Force Thunderbirds
- 495th Fighter Group - Shaw AFB, South Carolina
  - 53d Fighter Squadron - Andrews AFB, Washington DC
  - 306th Fighter Squadron - Atlantic City ANGB, New Jersey
  - 316th Fighter Squadron - McEntire JNGB, South Carolina
  - 367th Fighter Squadron - Homestead ARB, Florida
  - 383d Fighter Squadron - Buckley SFB, Colorado
  - 384th Fighter Squadron - Duluth ANGB, Minnesota

==== Air Education and Training Command ====
The Air Education and Training Command (AETC) provides for most of the US Air Force's F-16 training facilities and operations. The command also provides for training of foreign air forces operating the F-16, with two squadrons providing training for Singapore and Taiwan.

- 54th Fighter Group (GSU) - Holloman AFB, New Mexico
  - 8th Fighter Squadron
  - 311th Fighter Squadron
  - 314th Fighter Squadron
- 56th Fighter Wing - Luke AFB, Arizona
  - 21st Fighter Squadron
  - 309th Fighter Squadron
  - 425th Fighter Squadron

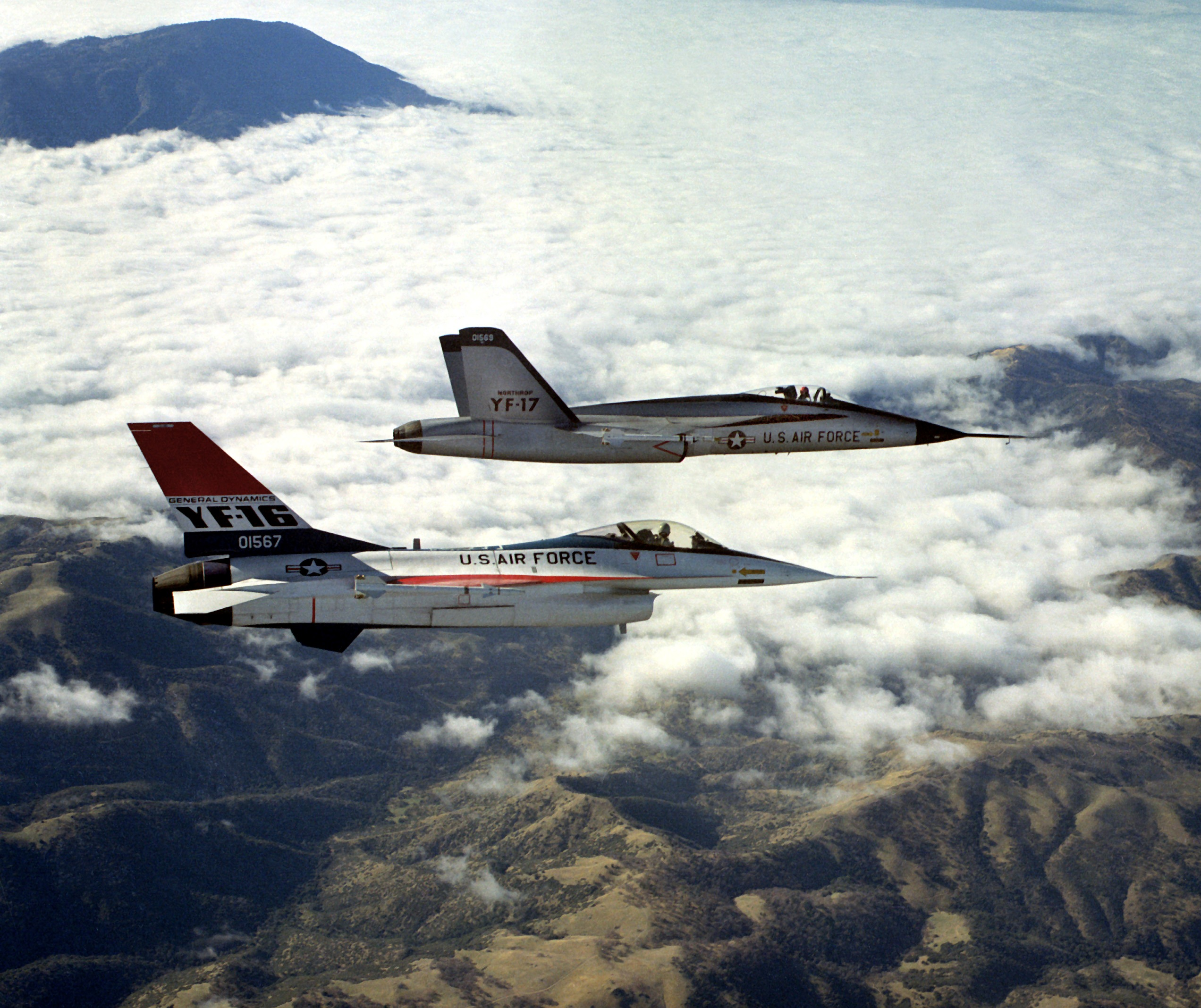
YF-16 alongside the Northrop YF-17

==== Air Force Materiel Command ====
The descendant of the merger of the Air Force Systems Command (AFSC) and the Air Force Logistics Command (AFLC), Air Force Materiel Command is responsible for providing, testing, and maintaining US Air Force equipment. As such, it plays a large part in the F-16 program, both in testing the aircraft and its weapon systems. It utilizes the F-16 for numerous tests for weapons equipping many US Air Force aircraft. Additionally, it operates overhaul programs to maintain the F-16 fleet of not only the US Air Force, but several foreign air forces as well.

- 96th Test Wing - Eglin AFB, Florida
  - 40th Flight Test Squadron
- 412th Test Wing - Edwards AFB, California
  - 416th Flight Test Squadron

==== Air Force Reserve Command ====
The delivery of the F-16 to the Air Force Reserve Command (AFRC) marked the first aircraft type to be delivered new, changing the long policy of merely passing older airframes on from the active forces to the Air Force Reserve. AFRC currently operates Block 25, 30, and 32 aircraft.

- 482d Fighter Wing - Homestead JARB, Florida
  - 93d Fighter Squadron
- 926th Wing
  - 706th Aggressor Squadron
- 944th Fighter Wing - Luke AFB, Arizona
  - 69th Fighter Squadron

==== Air National Guard ====
As with the Air Force Reserve, the F-16 marked the transition of the Air National Guard (ANG) to a viable fighting force complementary to active-duty units, as opposed to the second-line force of out-of-date aircraft it had been. The F-16 remains a key part of the ANG force structure.

- Arizona Air National Guard
  - 162d Fighter Wing - Tucson International Airport
    - 148th Fighter Squadron
    - 195th Fighter Squadron
- Colorado Air National Guard
  - 140th Wing - Buckley Space Force Base
    - 120th Fighter Squadron
- District of Columbia Air National Guard
  - 113th Wing - Andrews AFB
    - 121st Fighter Squadron
- Indiana Air National Guard
  - 122nd Fighter Wing
    - 163rd Fighter Squadron
- Minnesota Air National Guard
  - 148th Fighter Wing - Duluth International Airport
    - 179th Fighter Squadron
- New Jersey Air National Guard
  - 177th Fighter Wing - Atlantic City International Airport
    - 119th Fighter Squadron
- Ohio Air National Guard
  - 180th Fighter Wing - Toledo Express Airport
    - 112th Fighter Squadron
- Oklahoma Air National Guard
  - 138th Fighter Wing - Tulsa International Airport
    - 125th Fighter Squadron
- South Carolina Air National Guard
  - 169th Fighter Wing - McEntire Joint National Guard Station
    - 157th Fighter Squadron
- South Dakota Air National Guard
  - 114th Fighter Wing - Joe Foss Field
    - 175th Fighter Squadron
- Texas Air National Guard
  - 149th Fighter Wing - Kelly Field Annex
    - 182d Fighter Squadron

==== Pacific Air Forces ====
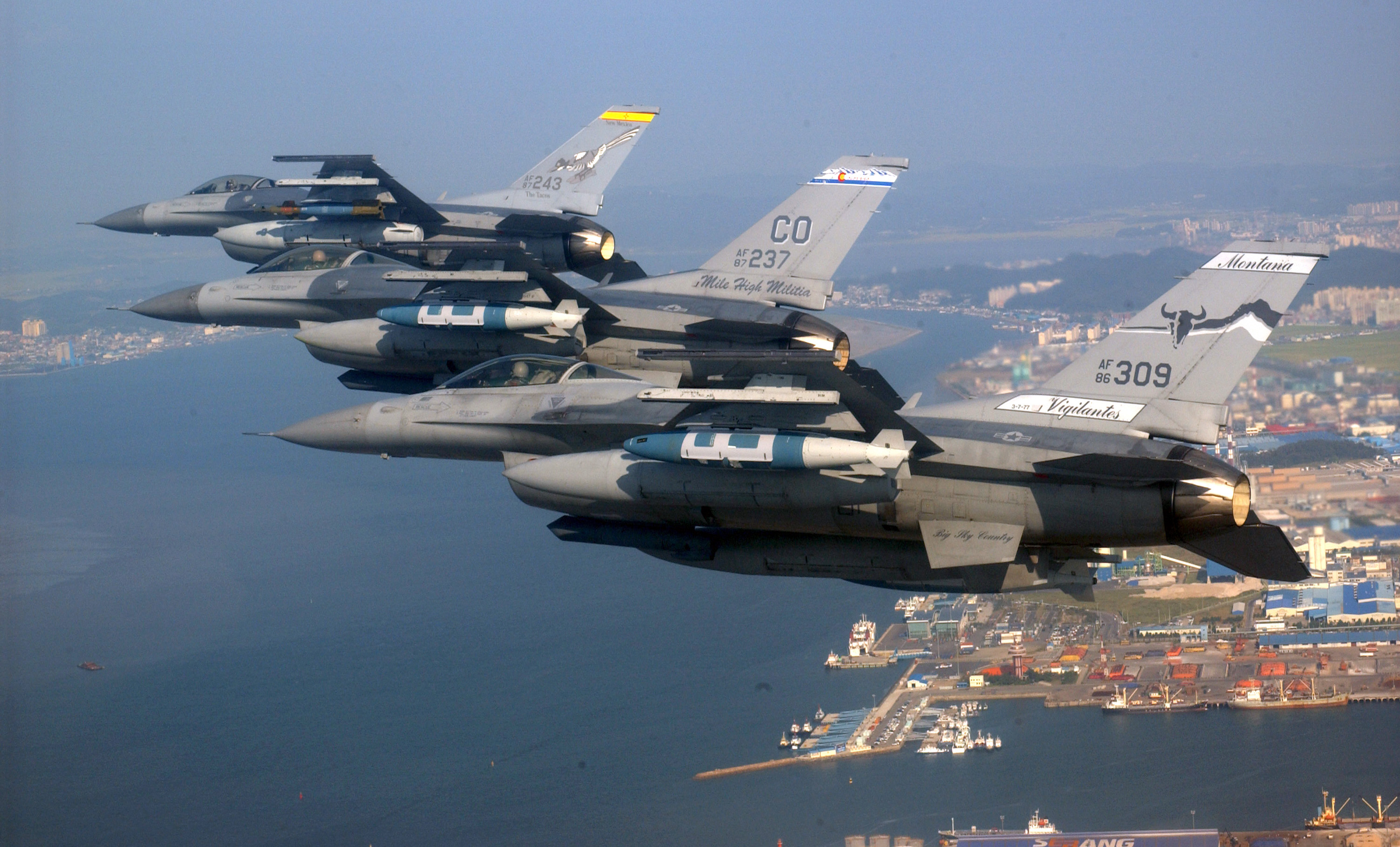
Air National Guard aircraft over Kunsan Air Base, South Korea

Pacific Air Forces (PACAF) was an early recipient of the F-16 and PACAF operates the latest models of the F-16 today.

- 8th Fighter Wing - Kunsan AB, South Korea
  - 35th Fighter Squadron
  - 80th Fighter Squadron
- 35th Fighter Wing - Misawa AB, Japan
  - 13th Fighter Squadron
  - 14th Fighter Squadron
- 51st Fighter Wing - Osan AB, South Korea
  - 36th Fighter Squadron
- 354th Fighter Wing - Eielson AFB, Alaska
  - 18th Fighter Interceptor Squadron

==== United States Air Forces in Europe ====
Once PACAF began receiving its F-16s, United States Air Forces in Europe (USAFE) became a recipient of the F-16. USAFE F-16s have been active in most recent US military operations in Europe and the Middle East.

- 31st Fighter Wing - Aviano AB, Italy
  - 510th Fighter Squadron
  - 555th Fighter Squadron
- 52d Fighter Wing - Spangdahlem AB, Germany
  - 480th Fighter Squadron

=== United States Navy ===
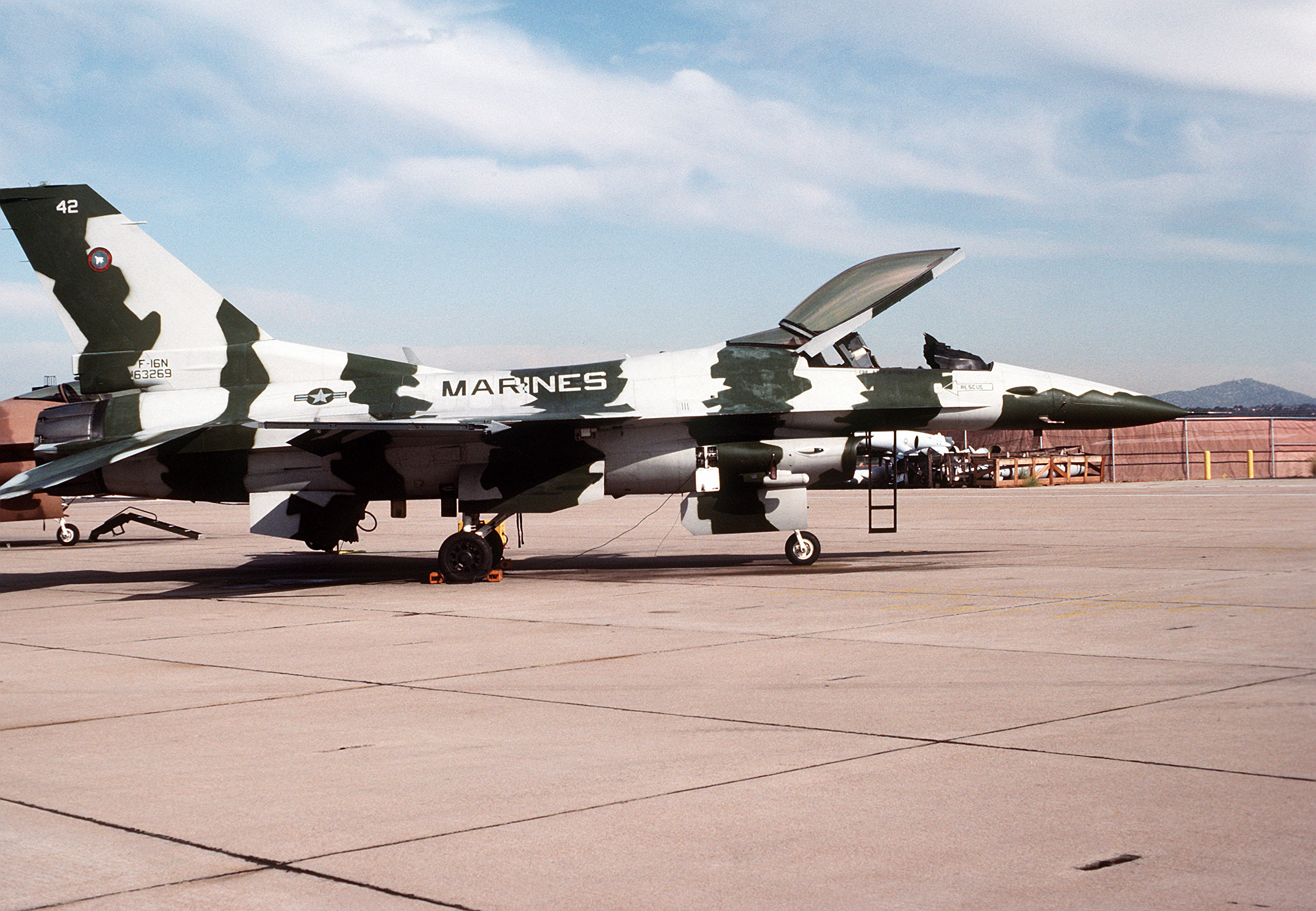
U.S. Navy/Marine Corps General Dynamics F-16N Viper

While the United States Navy chose the competing McDonnell Douglas F/A-18 Hornet for development as a carrier-based strike fighter, the service still had a need for an adversary aircraft to supplement the Douglas A-4 Skyhawk and Northrop F-5E Tiger II aircraft posing as enemy fighters to help train Navy pilots in dissimilar air combat training (DACT). The lightweight F-16 was ideal for the job, and the F-16N version was specifically developed for the task. With removal of the internal cannon (compensated by ballast), the F-16N and two-seat TF-16N served for a number of years before retirement. The F-16 was reintroduced to the adversary role for the US Navy with the acquisition of some of the Pakistani F-16A/B-15OCU aircraft embargoed before delivery to that country and they remain in use today at the Naval Strike and Air Warfare Center (NSAWC) at NAS Fallon, Nevada. The US Navy operates 40 F-16s.

=== National Aeronautics and Space Administration ===
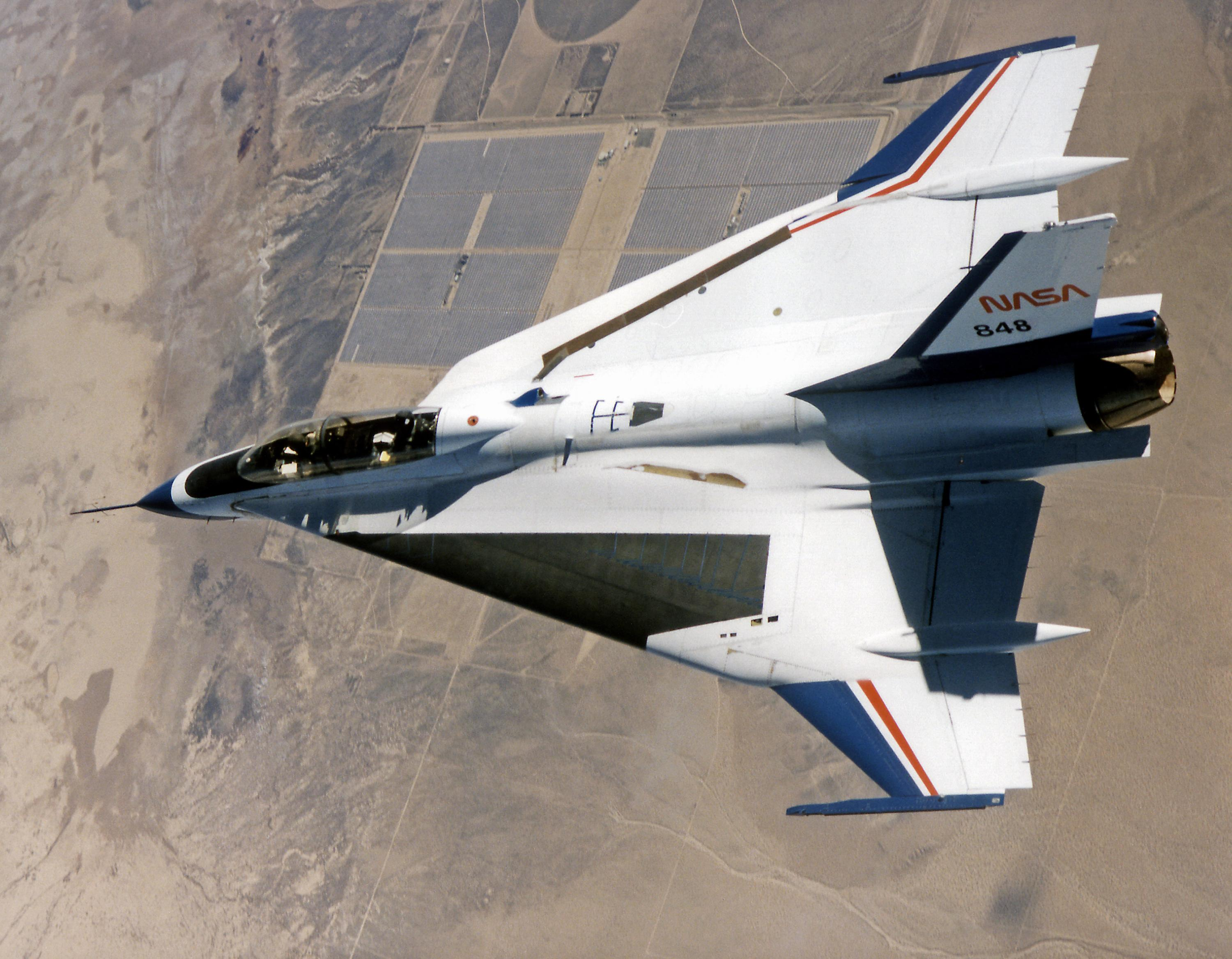
NASA's two-seat F-16XL

Though not a military force, NASA plays a vital role in research and development of aerospace technology. Its fleet contains two exotic F-16 models (bailed from USAF), the F-16XL and F-16A AFTI, both involved in researching advanced technologies for application to not only the F-16, but other aircraft as well. Additionally, a number of standard F-16s have been operated by NASA as chase aircraft and engine testbeds.

== Original NATO partners ==
Once selected by the United States, it was further decided to form a partnership between the United States Air Force, then beginning development of the plane for service, and nations of the NATO alliance who had a similar need for a lightweight fighter. Four such nations chose to join the development effort, becoming involved in production and sub-contracting work. The four European partners, collectively known as the European Participating Governments (EPG), are Belgium, Denmark, the Netherlands, and Norway; their air forces are likewise referred to as the European Participating Air Forces (EPAF).

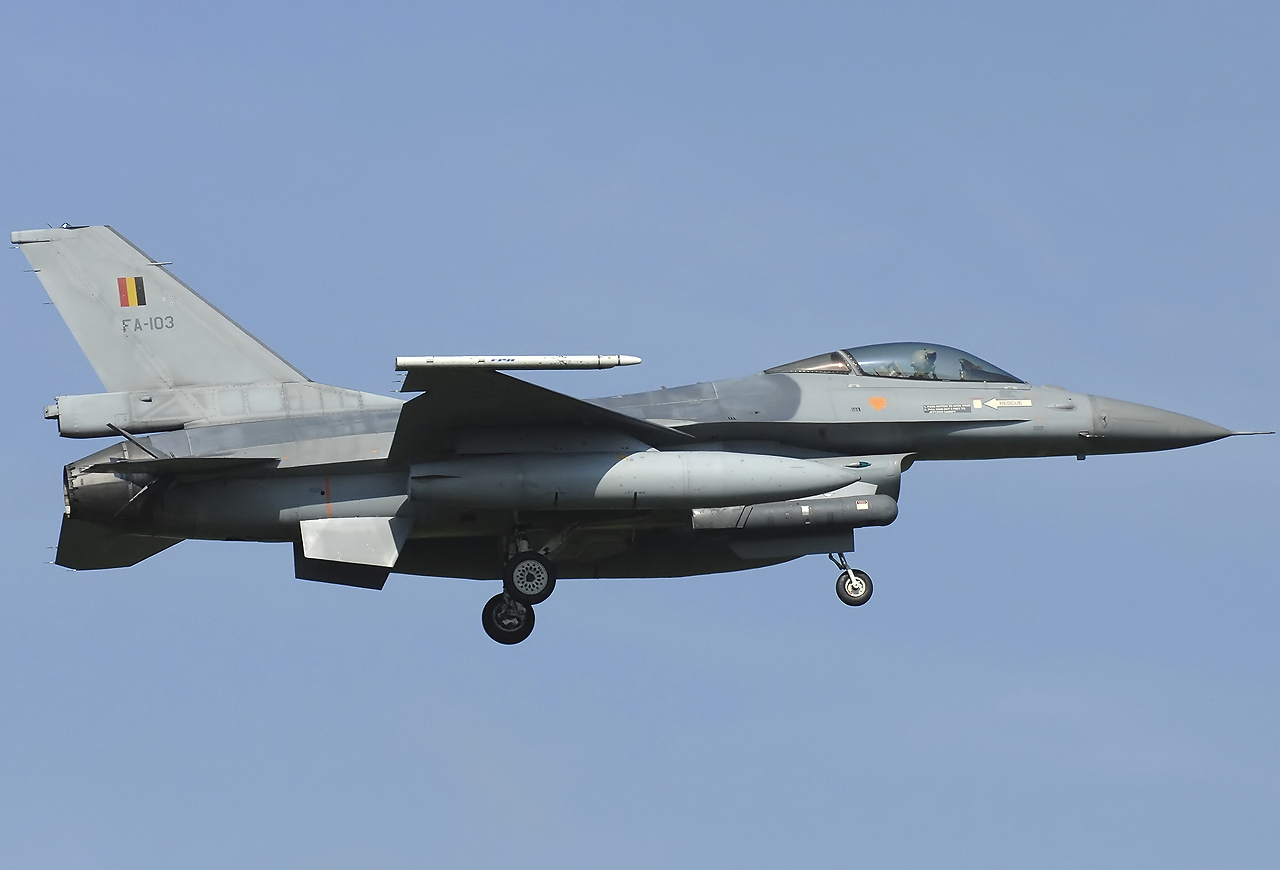
Belgium

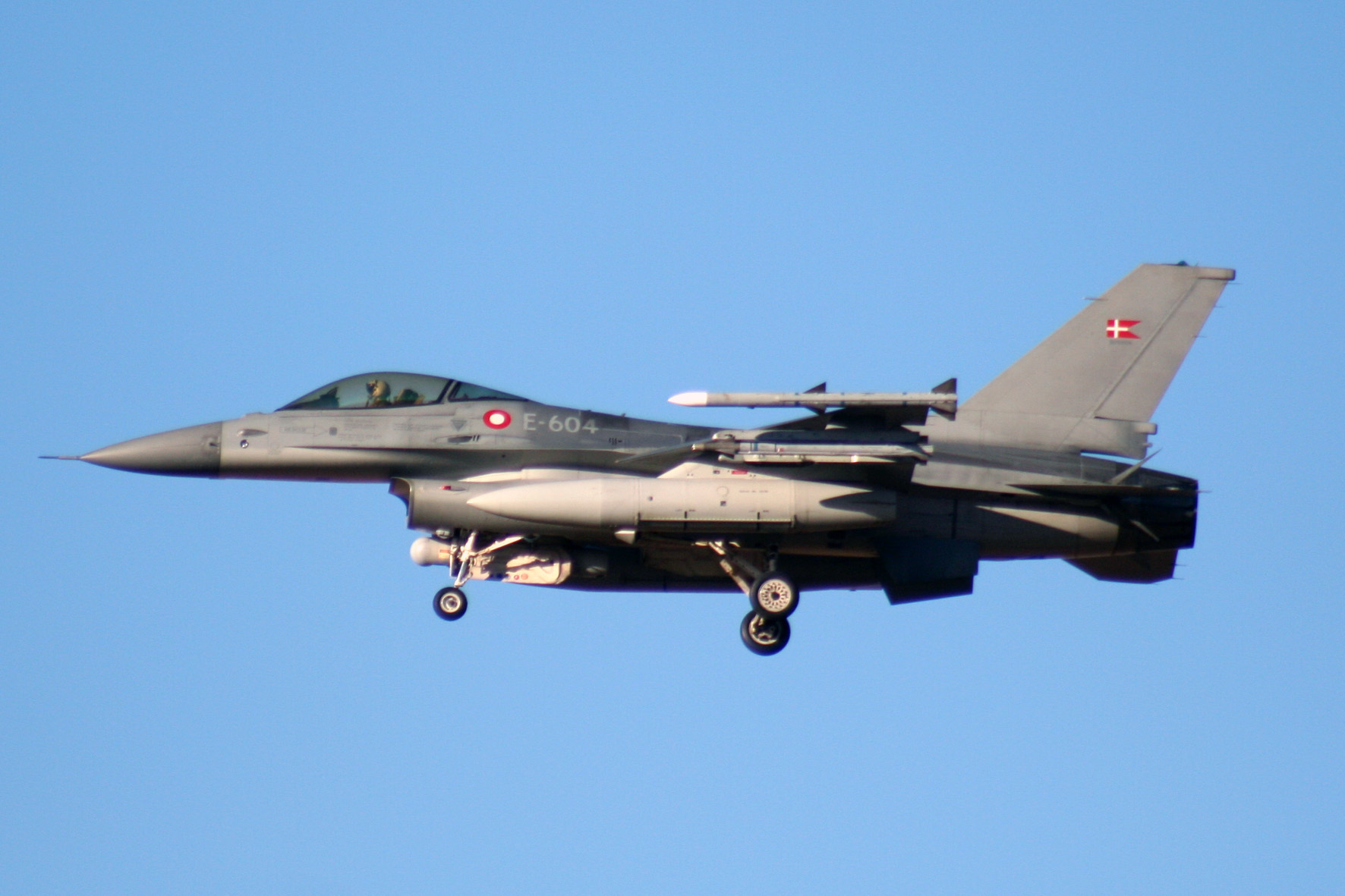
Denmark

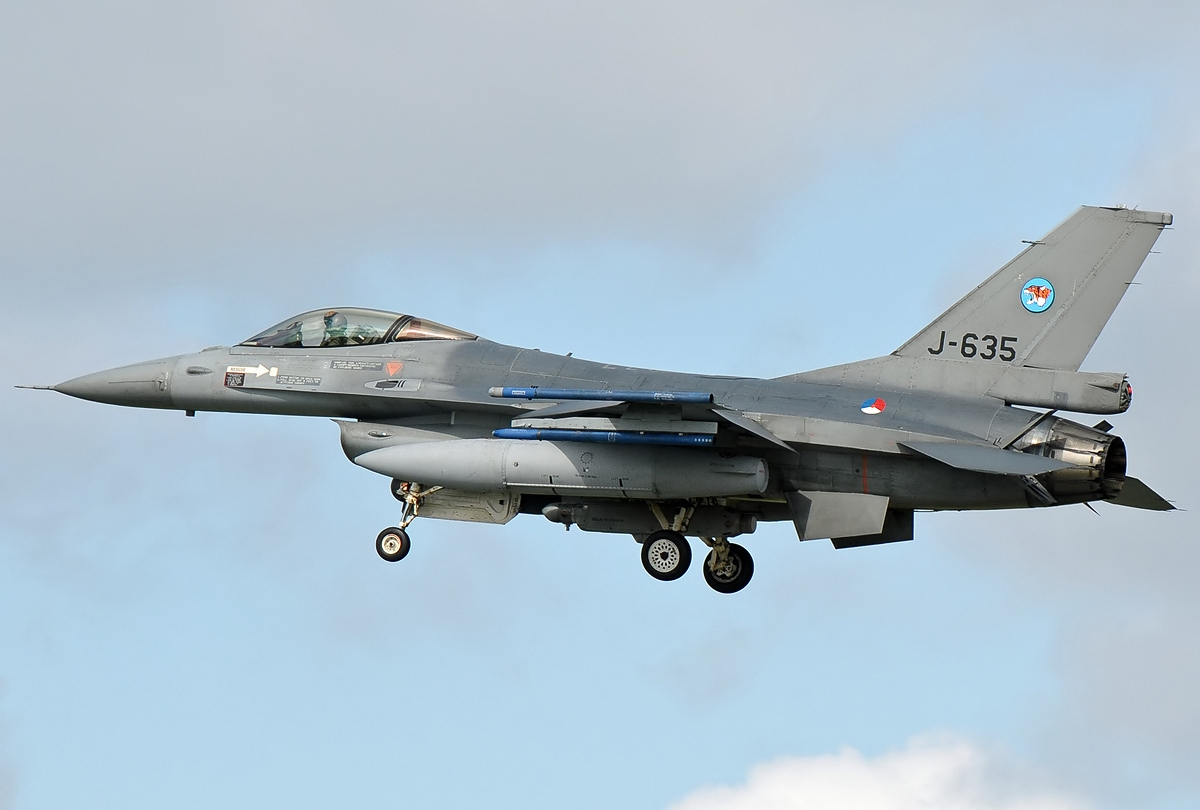
Netherlands

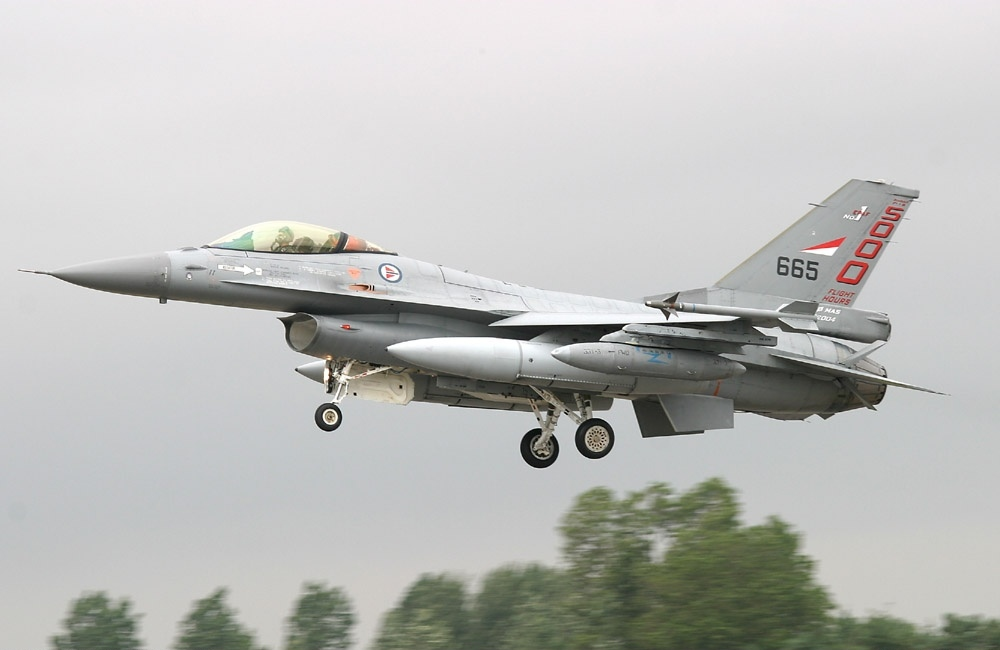
Norway

=== Belgium ===
Belgium was the largest initial buyer of the F-16 of the four original NATO partners. Its aeronautical company, SABCA, was a primary producer of the aircraft as part of the partnership. Belgium's initial order included 116 F-16A/B aircraft in blocks 1, 5, 10, and 15. Delivery began in 1979, and was completed in 1985. A follow-on order for 44 F-16A/B-15OCU aircraft was completed in 1991. Most of the Danish F-16s were also manufactured in Belgium. Many of the Belgian and Danish F-16s received the MLU update at SABCA.

=== Denmark ===
Denmark was the smallest member of the NATO partnership, with the Royal Danish Air Force accepting 58 F-16A/B aircraft under Denmark's initial order on January 28, 1980. A small follow-on order brought a further twelve aircraft to Denmark, and two further attrition replacement orders were later placed, resulting in a total of 62 F-16AM and 16 F-16BM that entered Danish service. After 46 years of service, the Royal Danish Air Force officially retired its fleet of F16s on 18 January 2026.

Denmark is donating 19 surplus F16s to Ukraine to strengthen its air force; deliveries are expected to be completed by the end of 2026. Denmark is also providing training for Ukrainian pilots and ground crew.

On 19 December 2024, Argentina received its first ex-Royal Danish Air Force F-16s purchased from Denmark in a deal worth approximately $300 million. The sale is made up of: 16 F-16AM single-seat aircraft, eight F-16BM two-seat aircraft, training, parts, and spare engines.

=== Netherlands ===
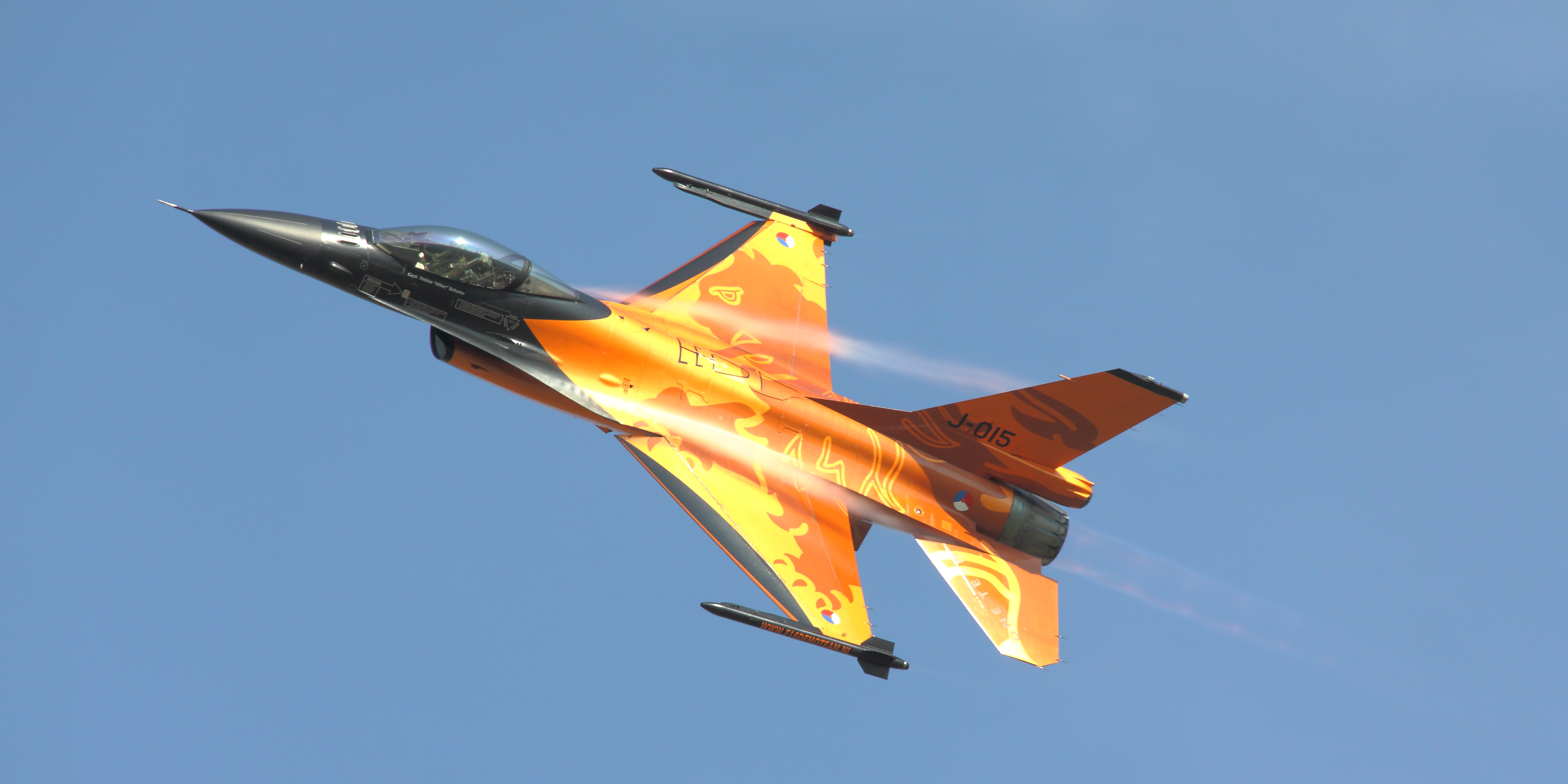
A Dutch F-16 in a special orange livery for air displays

The Netherlands, like Belgium, made substantial orders for the F-16, and built aircraft at the Fokker plant. Deliveries started in 1979 and ended in 1992. A total of 102 aircraft were initially ordered, which was followed by subsequent orders of a further 111 aircraft. Fifty-two of these were F-16A/B-15OCU aircraft. These orders brought the total Dutch F-16A/B deliveries to 213. 108 of these aircraft received the Mid-Life-Update (MLU). The Royal Netherlands Air Force (RNLAF) retired its fleet of F-16s on 27 September 2024; 18 surplus F-16AM/BM fighters were sold to Romania.

On 26 May 2025, Ukraine received the last of 24 F-16AM/BM Fighting Falcons donated by the Netherlands; the Dutch also provide training, fuel, and spare parts.

=== Norway ===
Norway joined the original NATO-USAF partnership to replace its aging Lockheed F-104 Starfighter squadrons. In 1975, Norway placed an order for 74 F-16A/B aircraft which were delivered between 1980 and 1984. Unlike the other partners, there have been no follow-up orders, except for a single order in 1989 for two F-16B-15OCU aircraft as replacements for crashed aircraft. All the aircraft received the Mid-Life-Update (MLU), and the new helmet-mounted sighting system. On 6 January 2022, Norway announced that all of its F-16s had been retired, having been replaced by the Lockheed Martin F-35 Lightning II. As of December 2026, Norway, Denmark, and the Netherlands are three of the original 5 program partners to have retired its entire F-16 fleet. However, Belgium has plans to do so in the near future.

== Europe ==
=== Bulgaria ===
It was reported in December 2012 that Bulgaria was going to negotiate buying eight or nine second-hand fighter jets. Among the contenders were the Swedish Gripen, second-hand Italian Eurofighters and second-hand Portuguese F-16s. Later, in January 2013, it was reported that the Bulgarian Defense Ministry was expected to buy nine F-16s from Portugal. The final phase of the initial preparations was to be started by the middle of 2013. However, widespread protests led to the resignation of the Borisov cabinet, which delayed all government plans and activities.

A new round of negotiations for the purchase of second-hand Greek F-16s had started by the middle of 2014. Possible negotiations with the US were also expected, with hopes of reaching a decision over the procurement in 2015. In July 2015, the government of Bulgaria approved negotiations with Belgium, the Netherlands and Greece for the procurement of second-hand F-16s. The increasingly pressing issue of MiG-29 maintenance, which had been pushing on the deadlines of the procurement, was expected to be resolved by an agreement with Poland for the repairs of the jets' engines. The decision was further delayed beyond 2015 because no money had been set aside for the purchase. To alleviate the issue of air defence, the Ministry of Defence proposed to allow other NATO members to conduct air-policing missions with the Bulgarian Air Force. By then, only four Bulgarian MiG-29s had enough flying capacity left to conduct air policing. This nearly led to the stepping down of the Bulgarian Air Force Commander at the time, Rumen Radev, as a protest against the Defence Ministry's plan to conduct joint air-policing missions. He stated that the overhaul of MiG-29 engines was only a temporary solution, with the purchase of new fighters still considered urgent. In response, the Bulgarian Ministry of Finance reportedly set aside funding for the purchase of new fighter jets in the 2016 budget draft.

Plans and procedures for the procurement of fighter jets and patrol ships were established in the middle of 2016, with around 2.42 billion lev (1.24 billion euro) earmarked for the projects. The estimated cost of the jets was expected to be around 1.5 billion lev and a contract for eight aircraft was supposed to be reached by the end of 2016. Deliveries were planned from 2018 to 2021, and those of an additional eight aircraft from 2022 to 2023. In October 2016, it was alleged that technical specifications for the procurement had been altered to favor the F-16, which led to several Bulgarian members of parliament to request comments from the Minister of Defence. More delays were met as Prime Minister Boyko Borisov resigned due to his party's presidential candidate losing the elections, and because Bulgarian parties failed to form a new government, which led to new elections. By March 2017, the Bulgarian Ministry of Defence had received three offers; from Sweden with Gripens, from Italy with second-hand Eurofighters, and from Portugal with second-hand US F-16s. A working group began evaluating these offers and by April, concluded that the Gripen was the preferred choice.

In June 2017, Bulgaria had said that it would start negotiations for the Gripen. However, the procurement was again put on hold over concerns that not all bidders were treated equally. A new round of proposals was asked, which also included newly built Eurofighters from Italy and F-16s from the United States. In November 2017, it was reported that the Bulgarian Air Force was also looking into buying US-made Super Hornets. A decision was expected by July 2018. In March 2018, it was reported that Israel was to be invited to participate in the tender with F-16C/D fighter jets. In December 2018, the Bulgarian Ministry of Defence selected the offer for eight F-16Vs from the United States for an estimated 1.8 billion lev ($1.05 billion) as the preferred option, and recommended the government to start talks with the US.

On 16 January 2019, the Bulgarian parliament approved the government's proposal to start negotiations with the United States to purchase F-16V Block 70 aircraft. In May 2019 however, Bulgarian Minister of Defence Krasimir Karakachanov stated in a radio interview that Bulgaria was considering walking away from negotiations for the aircraft, saying that although Bulgaria was not expecting aircraft "for free, but at normal prices, taking into account the prices offered to other countries, for example Slovakia." On June 3, 2019, the US State Department approved the possible sale of eight F-16s to Bulgaria. The cost of the contract was estimated at $1.2 billion. The deal was vetoed by the Bulgarian President, Rumen Radev on 23 July 2019, citing the need to find a broader consensus for the deal, sending the deal back to parliament, but on 26 July the deal was again approved by parliament, overruling the veto, and this time was approved by Radev. In November 2022, the purchase of a further 8 planes, spares, weapons and other systems was approved by the parliament, for delivery in 2027. The first eight F-16s were delivered by December 2025.

=== Greece ===
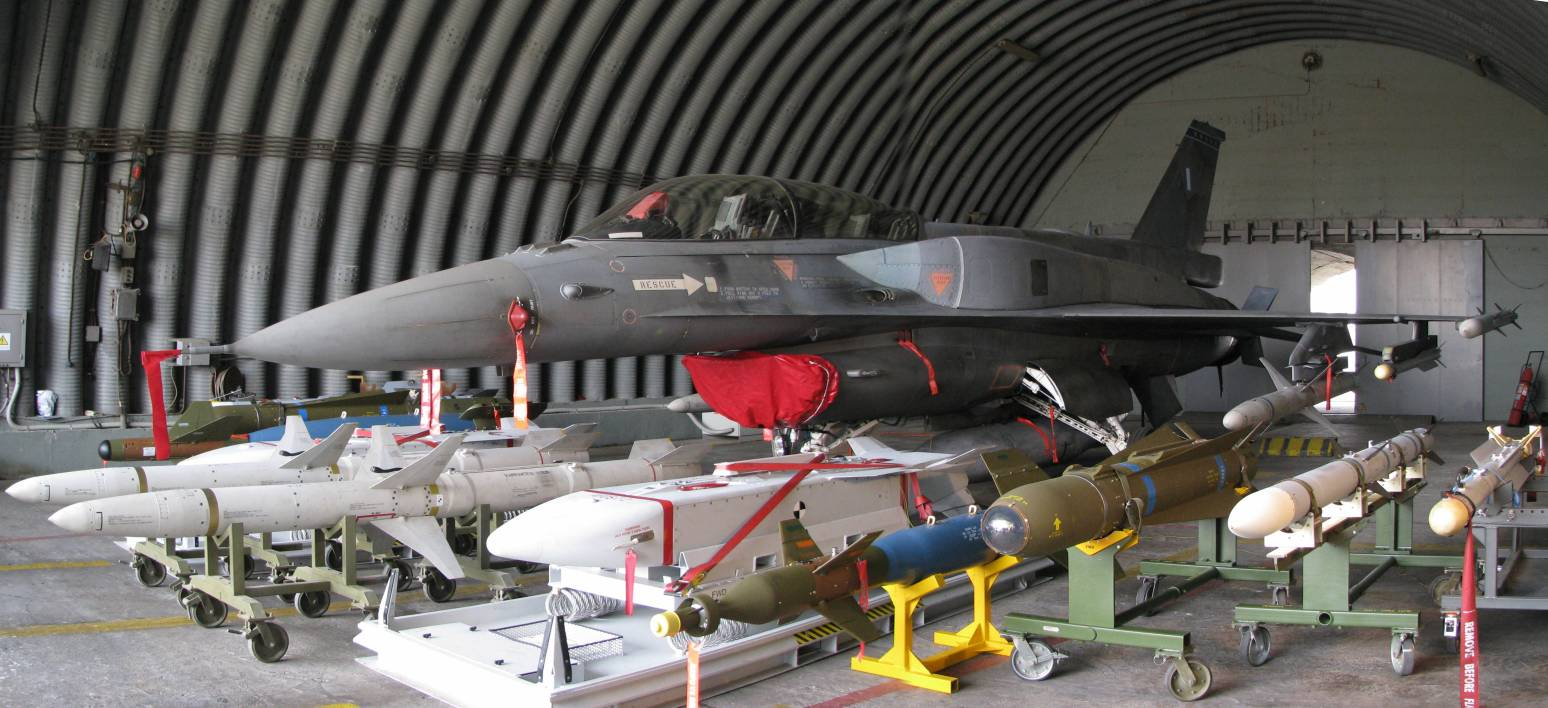
An F-16D Block 52+ of the Hellenic Air Force with Conformal Fuel Tanks

Greece's Hellenic Air Force acquired 170 F-16s between 1989 and 2010 as part of the four-phase Peace Xenia program:

- Peace Xenia I: Greece received 34 F-16Cs and six F-16Ds, both from Block 30 (delivered 1988–1990)
- Peace Xenia II: 32 F-16Cs and 8 F-16Ds from Block 50 equipped with LANTIRN navigation and targeting pod systems (1997–1998)
- Peace Xenia III: 40 F-16Cs and 20 F-16Ds from Block 52+, which included conformal fuel tanks (2003–2004)
- Peace Xenia IV: 20 F-16Cs and 10 F-16Ds from Block 52+ Advanced, which replaced A-7 Corsairs and were ordered instead of Eurofighter Typhoons (2009–2010)

On 28 April 2018, Greece decided to upgrade 85 of its F-16C Block 50+ fighters to the F-16V standard. On 17 January 2021, Hellenic Aerospace Industry (HAI) upgraded first F-16C to the latest F-16V standard. As of 2021, the Hellenic Aerospace Industry (HAI) planned to upgrade 12 F-16 to the F-16V standard per year. In October 2026, Greece announced that 37 of its F-16 Block 50s would also be upgraded to the F-16V standard. Greek F-16C Block 30 fighters will not be upgraded to the F-16V standard and could be transferred to Ukraine.

Units:

- 330 Squadron "Thunderbolt" F-16C/D Block 30
- 335 Squadron "Tiger" F-16C/D Block 52+ Advanced
- 337 Squadron "Ghost" F-16C/D Block 52+
- 340 Squadron "Fox" F-16C/D Block 52+
- 341 Squadron "Arrow" F-16C/D Block 50
- 343 Squadron "Star" F-16C/D Block 52+
- 346 Squadron "Jason (Iason)" F-16C/D Block 30 ( Disbanded )
- 347 Squadron "Perseus" F-16C/D Block 50

=== Poland ===
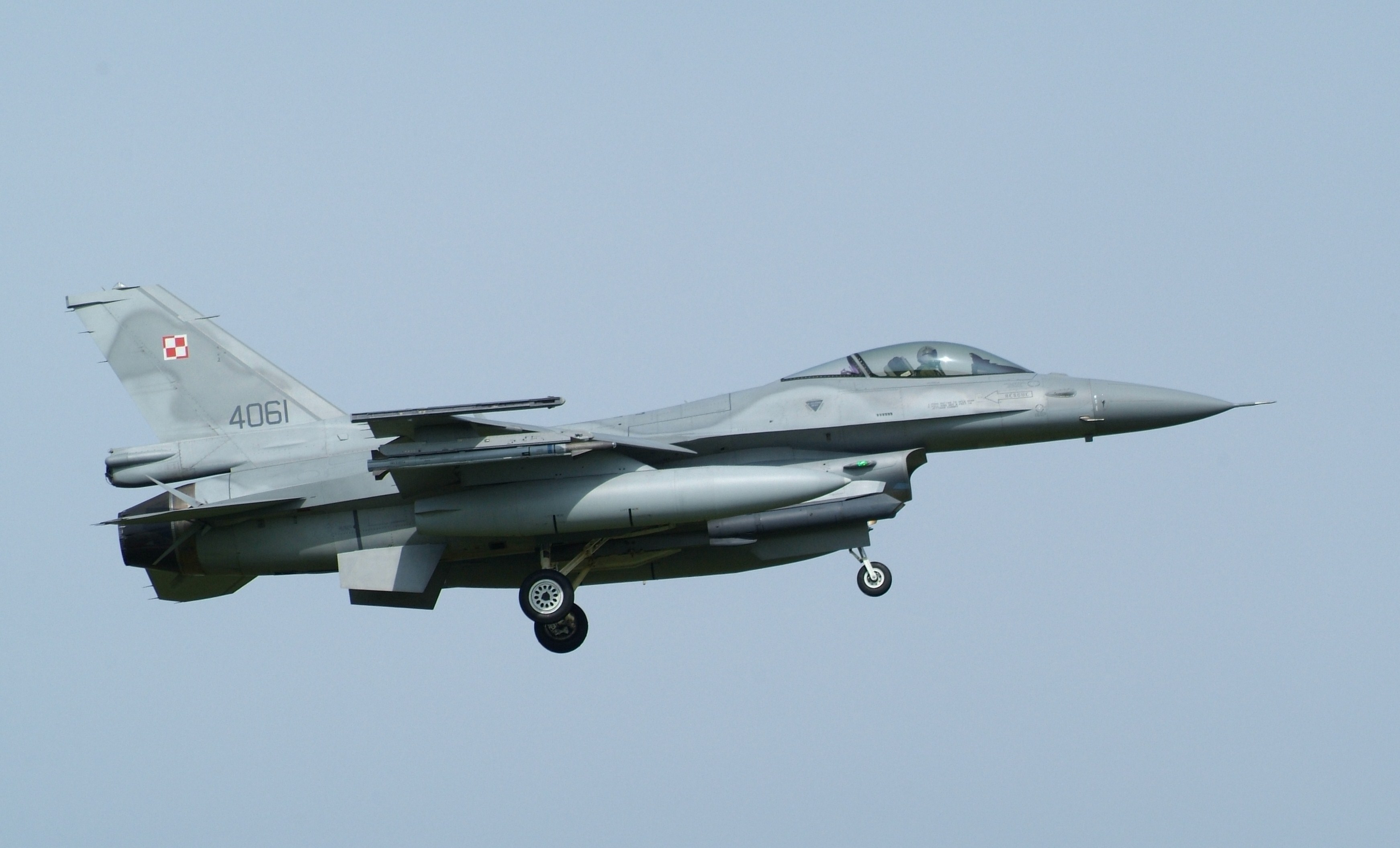
Polish F-16C

One of the former members of the Warsaw Pact that was looking to replace an aging fleet of Soviet-built Mikoyan-Gurevich MiG-23 (withdrawn in service in 1999 due to their small numbers and uneconomical operation) and the Mikoyan-Gurevich MiG-21 fighters (withdrawn from service in 2003), Poland conducted a competition between the Mirage 2000-5 Mk.2, the JAS 39 Gripen, the Mikoyan-Gurevich MiG-29 (the last offer was withdrawn), and the F-16 Fighting Falcon. Despite a strong challenge by the BAe/SAAB team, on 19 April 2003, Poland purchased 48 F-16C/D-52+ aircraft for $3.5 billion.

The aircraft were delivered from 2006 under the PEACE SKY program. To avoid confusion with the PZL W-3 Sokół (Polish language "Falcon") helicopter, these jet fighters were nicknamed the F-16 Jastrząb (Goshawk) in Polish. The F-16, along with 32 Mikoyan-Gurevich MiG-29 fighters and 48 Sukhoi Su-22 ground attack aircraft, are the main offensive strike force for the Polish Air Force.

There have also been delays in the offset program, the United States has not made all the promised investments in Poland that were part of the deal. Offset deals in 2011 reached $6 billion out of $6.028 billion planned ($9.8 billion at time when offer was chosen), however only one-third of recognised offsets commitment were direct investments in Polish economy.

According to a former Polish military defence vice-minister, the offer for JAS 39 Gripen was a better deal. F-16s cost $3.5 billion, compared to 3.2 billion euro for Saab's Gripen, and 3.6 billion euro for Dassault offer, at a time when both currencies had a similar exchange rate.

Poland lost one of its 48 F-16 on 28 August 2025 when a pilot preparing for an air show crashed after an aerobatic maneuver.

=== Portugal ===
The Portuguese Air Force chose the F-16 during the 1980s to replace its aging and obsolescent LTV A-7 Corsair II attack aircraft which were no longer suitable for air-to-air combat and were facing severe logistical problems.

The Portuguese Foreign Military Sales program is known as Peace Atlantis.

==== Peace Atlantis I ====
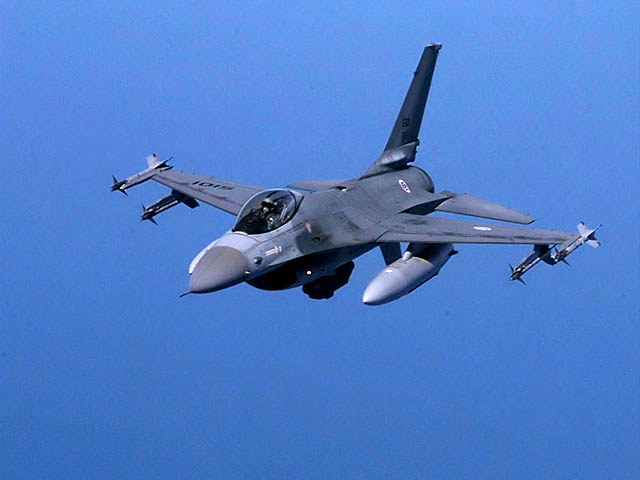
FAP F-16A on a combat air patrol mission during Operation Allied Force

In August 1990 the government of then-Prime Minister Aníbal Cavaco Silva signed a Letter Of Acceptance (LoA) which led to the creation of the Peace Atlantis I program. The funds used for the purchase were made available through the Foreign Military Sales program, partly a payment for the use by the United States of Lajes Air Base in the Azores. Initially the United States proposed to supply Portugal with surplus Block 10 aircraft. However this option rested on a first order of 20 newly built F-16 Block 15 OCU (17 A models and three B models) with Pratt & Whitney F100 engines, which made them almost identical to the US Air National Guard's F-16 ADF. Deliveries of this first order began on February 18, 1994, and were completed on July 18, 1994.

The initial group of Portuguese F-16 pilots was constituted by fighter pilots from the 302 and 304 Squadrons, received training in Tucson, Arizona, between January and June 1994.

During the War in Kosovo, it was seen that, while the Portuguese F-16s were recently obtained, they were no longer up to the same level as most modern fighters used by other NATO countries. In 1999, during the Portuguese participation in the conflict (Operation Allied Force), the three F-16 fighters deployed by Portugal were relegated to escort missions and combat air patrols due to their lack of modern armament and air-to-ground targeting systems.

==== Peace Atlantis II ====
During 1996, during the government of then-Prime Minister António Guterres, new negotiations took place concerning the possible purchase of new F-16 fighters and the modernization of those aircraft. The Pentagon approved of the deal on November 20, 1997, and on November 30, 1998, Portugal signed a Letter of Offer and Acceptance (LoA) for 25 second-hand F-16 Block 15 (21 A and four B) that had been used by the U.S. Air National Guard. Under the program these would be offered by the United States at zero cost and free of charge as Excess Defense Articles under the Southern Regional Amendment to the Arms Export and Control Act, with Portugal being responsible for their transportation to Europe and for the modernization costs.

Included in the LoA and in the Peace Atlantis II program was also the purchase of new Pratt & Whitney F100-PW-220E engines, 20 upgrade kits, logistics support and training.

Initially, the plan consisted in only upgrading the second-hand aircraft of the Peace Atlantis II program and of transferring the F-16s from the Peace Atlantis I to a second squadron with the mission of performing tactical air support actions and tactical air support for maritime operations (TASMO), which wouldn't require the MLU kit.

Of the second-hand F-16s, five of the airframes were used as spare parts, and only the remaining 20 F-16s were intended for upgrade for day & night all-weather operations, by receiving the Falcon UP structural upgrade, the F100-PW-220E engine upgrade and the Mid-Life update (MLU) avionics and cockpit upgrade, to equip the 301 Squadron.

==== Current status ====
The Mid-Life upgrade (MLU) was performed in Portugal by the Air Force's workshops at Monte Real and by OGMA in Alverca. In 2001, employees of the LMTAS modified the first two aircraft in a Lead-the-Fleet program, with Portuguese technicians observing. The first F-16 AM was delivered in June 2003, and the FAP personnel performed the modification of the remaining 18 aircraft.

Currently the Portuguese F-16 fleet uses the AN/ALQ-131 ECM pods, that had originally been bought for the A-7P Corsair IIs, and the new Rafael LITENING II targeting pods. One aircraft has been preserved for public display and two aircraft have been lost in accidents.

In 2006 the Portuguese government put 12 F-16s up for sale. On September 25, 2012, Romania and Portugal started negotiations for the sale of 12 used F-16s in a deal worth $600 million. Aircraft were to be delivered to Romania over the next five years. On October 11, 2013, the Romanian National Defense Ministry announced the signing of the contract for the purchase of 12 used F-16s. After the sale the Portuguese fleet would consist of 30 F-16s. To enable this, three ex-USAF F-16s (two F-16AMs and one F-16BM) were delivered in 2019.

Portuguese Air Force
Operating units	Model	Location
201 Squadron "Falcões"	F-16 AM; F-16 BM	Air Base No. 5, Monte Real
301 Squadron "Jaguares"	F-16 AM; F-16 BM	Air Base No. 5, Monte Real

==== Future Replacement ====
Portugal ruled out purchasing F-35s to replace F-16s because of US geopolitical decisions made under Trump and fears that he could block needed spare parts or software upgrades required.

=== Romania ===
On 24 March 2010, Romania's Supreme Defense Council approved the purchase of 24 refurbished F-16C/D Block 25 aircraft from the U.S. Air Force inventory. This multi-role aircraft acquisition plan was divided into three stages. These included purchasing 24 second-hand Block 25 F-16s and 24 brand-new Block 50/52. After the refurbished Block 25 aircraft were retired, the last phase of the program called for their replacement with 24 fifth-generation F-35 Lightning II fighters.

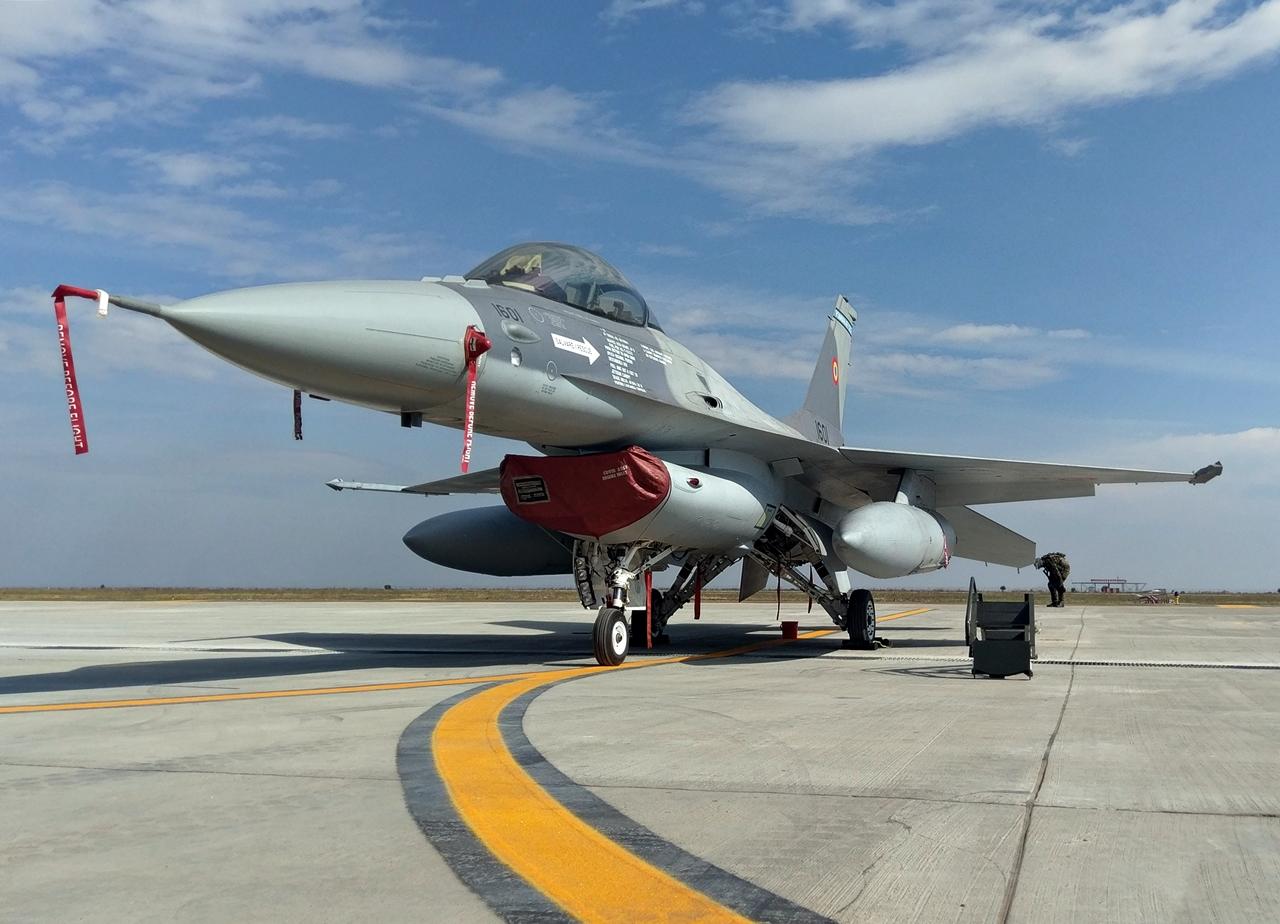
An F-16 of the Romanian Air Force

Due to budget constraints, the purchase of refurbished U.S. aircraft failed, and on 27 September 2012, Romania's Supreme Defense Council approved a plan to buy 12 used F-16s from Portugal in a deal worth 670 million euros. It was planned that the aircraft would be delivered over the next five years, and would enter operational service in 2016 after pilot training. Romania was to complete negotiations and finalization of documents with Portugal by the end of May, and with the U.S. by September. 120 million euros were used to pay for the aircraft, with the rest paying for logistic support. Legislation regarding the F-16 deal was passed by the country's Chamber of Deputies in June 2013 and on 12 July 2013, Romanian President Traian Băsescu formally approved the purchase.

The first batch of aircraft was scheduled to arrive in 2013. Total cost for the aircraft was estimated at US$1.4 billion. Romania failed to pay the first installment on the aircraft, even though it was delayed from 3 June to 3 August 2013.

On 11 October 2013, Romania completed the purchase of 12 Lockheed Martin F-16 Fighting Falcons with MLU package from Portugal under the Peace Carpathian program. The package was worth $252.6 million/€186.2 million, and included nine former Portuguese Air Force aircraft and three former United States Air Force aircraft supplied to Portugal for the resale under the U.S. Excess Defense Articles program. Nine aircraft were single-seat and three were twin-seat. Portugal would receive 78 million euros for the sale, and the rest would be spent acquiring and upgrading the surplus USAF aircraft and associated equipment. The first F-16 was scheduled to be delivered in 2016 with initial operational capability achieved in 2017.

The Romanian Armed Forces intended to buy 12 more Lockheed Martin F-16AM/BM Fighting Falcons by 2020 to equip a second squadron. After that, Romania planned to buy 24 F-16s of a newer generation by 2025, probably Block 50s.

On 27 September 2016, the first six F-16 MLUs entered service with the Romanian Air force. The first F-16 squadron was the 53rd Fighter Squadron at the 86th Airbase in Fetești.

In March 2019, the Romanian Ministry of Defence launched the procedure to procure an additional 36 F-16 aircraft.

In April 2019, the Romanian Ministry of Defence announced the Romanian Air Force would procure an additional five F-16s from Portugal. The five aircraft were received until March 2021.

On 4 November 2022, Romania signed a contract with Norway for an additional 32 F-16s, following the December 2021 announcement. The contract was worth €388 million, and the first airplanes arrived in 2023. The first squadron to be equipped with Norwegian F-16s was the 48th Fighter Squadron based at Câmpia Turzii, while the second squadron, the 58th Fighter Squadron, will be based at Mihail Kogălniceanu. The F-16s are expected to be retired between 2034 and 2040, according to a draft law the published by the Army in August 2024.

On 2 April 2025, it was reported that the F-16s used at the European F-16 Training Center (EFTC) would be transferred to Romanian service, thus forming a fourth squadron for training purposes. The 18 Dutch F-16s were transferred on 3 November the same year for the "symbolic price" of one euro.

On 19 May 2026, a Romanian F-16 shot down a Ukrainian drone in Estonia, marking the first Romanian Air Force aerial victory in 81 years. Between 24 July and 26 July, Romanian F-16s further shot down three Russian drones (one confirmed as a Geran-2) after they had entered Romanian airspace. The fighters used AIM-9X Sidewinder missiles during these incidents. Another Romanian F-16 further destroyed a Russian unmanned surface vehicle in the Black Sea using its onboard cannon on 20 August. On 17 October, another two Russian drones were shot down by Romanian F-16s. Both drones were jet-powered Geran-4s and were shot down inside Romanian airspace over Romania's territorial waters.

In 2026, Norway provided an additional F-16 to Romania for free as compensation for failing to deliver all the contracted aircraft in time. The delays resulted from prioritizing deliveries of spare parts to Ukraine. Additional maintenance and repair services for the Romanian F-16s were also received for free as part of the compensations.

The following units operate F-16s in Romania:

Romanian Air Force
Operating units	Model	Location
48th Fighter Squadron "Sky Lords"	F-16 AM; F-16 BM	71st Air Base, Câmpia Turzii
58th Fighter Squadron "Dacian Tigers"	F-16 AM; F-16 BM	71st Air Base, Câmpia Turzii
53rd Fighter Squadron "Warhawks"	F-16 AM; F-16 BM	86th Air Base, Fetești
European F-16 Training Center "Impalers"	F-16 AM; F-16 BM	86th Air Base, Fetești

=== Slovakia ===
Slovakia had been looking to replace its aging fleet of MiG-29s since at least 2014, when an option of leasing Swedish Saab JAS 39 Gripen fighters was considered. A possible proposal was finalized in December 2015. However, by June 2016, the deal was rejected due to concerns over cost. Following this, a new round of negotiations was opened. In February 2018, it was reported that Slovakia was in talks to buy either the F-16 or the Gripen fighter jets. In April 2018, the Slovak Ministry of Defence received an offer for F-16 fighters, amounting to $2.91 billion, from the US Department of Defense. On 11 July 2018, the Government of Slovakia approved the purchase of 14 F-16 Block 70/72 fighters for 1.589 billion euros ($1.86 billion).

In November 2018, the Slovak Ministry of Defence announced it had placed an order for 14 F-16Vs for €1.6 billion. Soon after however, the country's Prime Minister went on record to say the contracts were "invalid", stating the documents had not been approved by the Ministry of Finance. It was rapidly revealed that the inability of the ministries to cooperate was due to political rivalries, and the F-16 purchase had caused a minor political crisis in Slovakia. On 12 December 2018, the contract to acquire 12 single-seat and two twin-seat F-16 Block 70/72s was officially signed by Slovak Minister of Defense Peter Gajdoš. Lockheed conducted the first test flight of a Slovak F-16 on September 29, 2023, and delivered the first jets in January 2024.

=== Turkey ===
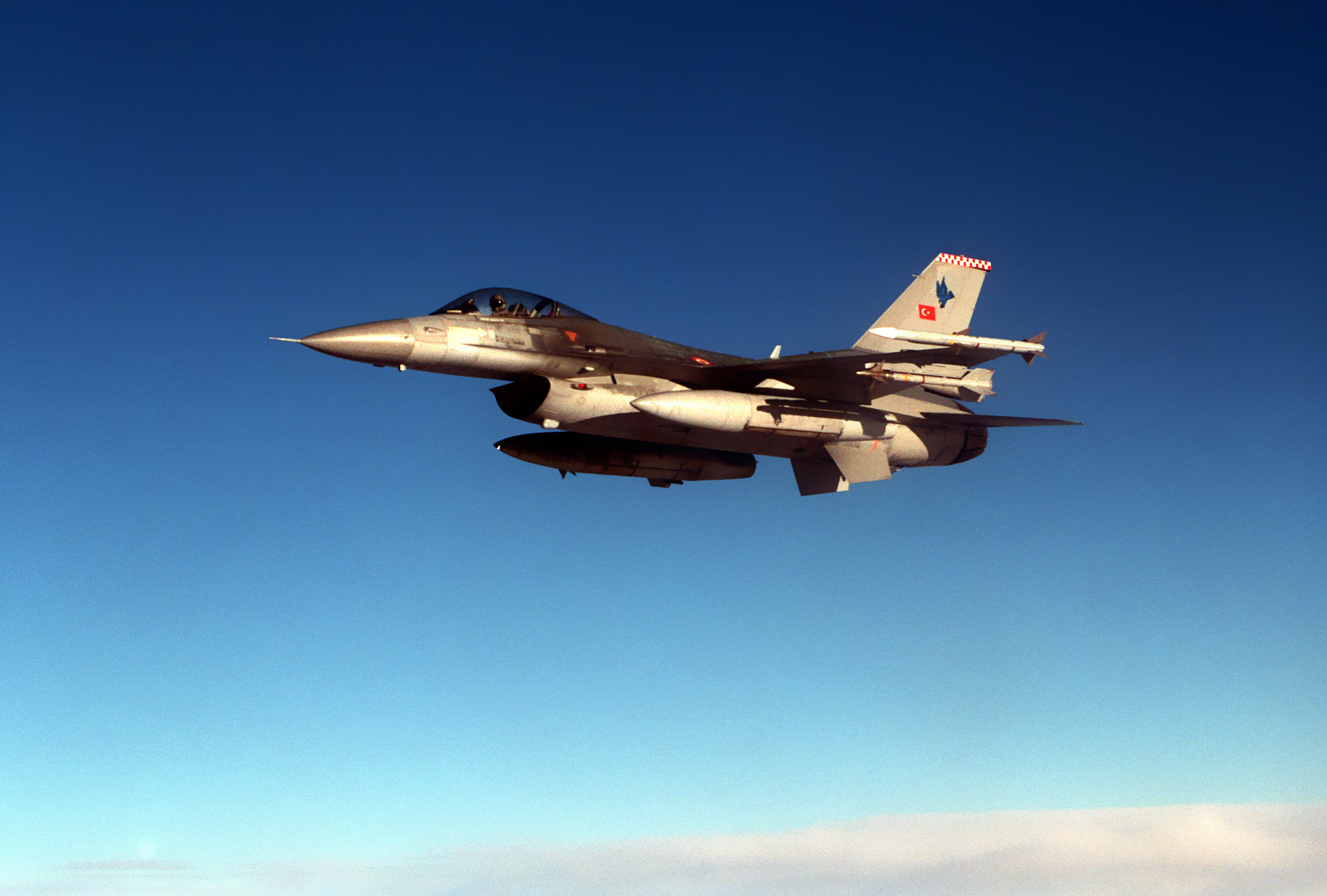
An F-16C Falcon from the Turkish Air Force

The Turkish Air Force is the world's third largest operator of the F-16, following the US and Israel. Turkey became one of the nations to indigenously produce the F-16, under a license from Lockheed Martin. Turkey initially received in total 240 F-16s. However, a further 30 were ordered in 2007. All Turkish F-16s are built by Turkish Aerospace Industries (TAI). Each new aircraft had to visit American territory under the terms of the PEACE ONYX Foreign Military Sales program before being turned over to the Turkish Air Force.

In 2005, Turkey signed a $1.1 billion avionics upgrade package, based on the USAF's Common Configuration Implementation Program (CCIP). In addition to this, the Turkish Air Force put a firm order for 30 more F-16 Block 50+, to be built by TAI.

As of 2016, all existing F16s except some Block 30s are now in Block 50+ 'Viper' configuration. On 24 March 2019, the Turkish State Secretariat for Defence officially confirmed that a further upgrade with ASELSAN dubbed 'Özgür' for the modernisation of TurAF's entire F-16 fleet with a domestic AESA radar and a new indigenous EW-self-protection suite.

As of 2023, the U.S. approved the sale of 40 new Block 70s and 79 modernization kits.

=== Ukraine ===
The Ukrainian Air Force has expressed interest in the F-16. On 18 May 2023 the US government told CNN that it would not block any requests by their allies to transfer their own F-16s to Ukraine but would not send its own F-16s to Ukraine. The question of training such pilots remained unanswered, which would likely involve some US involvement. Two pilots were sent to the United States to train on F-16 simulators for two weeks. A US Air Force document found that Ukrainian pilots learn how to operate the aircraft in four months. Of the two Ukrainian pilots, one was a MiG-29 flyer and another was a Su-27 pilot. The biggest issue was their lack of proficiency in the English language and their grounding in Soviet era tactics.

On 19 May, US President Joe Biden said that the US would allow Ukrainian pilots and crew to be trained on the F-16. Denmark has agreed to help train Ukrainians on the usage of the fighter. Denmark's Defence Minister Troels Lund Poulsen said Denmark "will now be able to move forward for a collective contribution to train Ukrainian pilots to fly F-16s." No start date has been announced for such training to commence. Once it does it could take six to nine months to properly train Ukrainian pilots and crews to use the F-16. Learning English is an important step for any training course.

President Zelenskyy has given a "flat assurance" to President Biden that Ukraine won't use F-16s over Russian territory.

In August 2023, President Biden allowed for the delivery of F-16s by their European allies.

On August 20, 2023, Zelenskyy stated that the Netherlands would be handing over up to 42 F-16s to Ukraine. In addition, Denmark announced its intention to hand over 19 aircraft to the Ukrainian Air Force, for a total of up to 61 aircraft. Four days later, on Ukraine's independence day, Norwegian Prime Minister Jonas Gahr Støre confirmed that his country would also provide 5-10 aircraft, depending on how many could be made operational. On 22 December, the Netherlands' Prime Minister Mark Rutte said that they were preparing an initial 18 F-16s for delivery.

On 5 February 2024, Minister of Defence Kajsa Ollongren announced the Netherlands would send six additional F-16s, following the cancellation of the planned sale to private military aircraft operator Draken International.

On 1 August 2024, Ukraine received its first F-16s, according to Associated Press.

On 4 August 2024, President Volodymyr Zelensky confirmed that Ukraine had started flying F-16 jets, concluding the long-awaited arrival of the U.S.-made fighter jets close to 29 months since the Russian Invasion. According to Forbes, these are the ex-Danish F-16AM/BM equipped with Pylon Integrated Dispensing System (PIDS) and the Electronic Combat Integrated Pylon System (ECIPS), both produced by Elbit Systems and Terma. PIDS ejects metal chaff and flares while ECIPS houses passive defenses to complement the active chaff and flares, including the AN/ALQ-162 jammer and AN/AAR-60 missile warning system for triggering the passive defenses. This is likely to counter the Russian S-300 and S-400. In total Ukraine is set to receive 85 F-16s from their European allies, however there are also not many surplus F-16s in those allies' inventories.

22 days later, Ukraine lost its first F-16 during a Russian attack on 26 August 2024, killing one of its top pilots.

By the end of 2024, Ukraine was expected to have received 20 F-16s. The remaining jets would be delivered in batches throughout 2025. In October 2024, Dutch minister of defence Ruben Brekelmans confirmed that the first of 24 pledged F-16s had been delivered.

On 13 December 2024, a F-16 of the UAF purportedly to have shot down six cruise missiles in a single sortie.

== Middle East ==
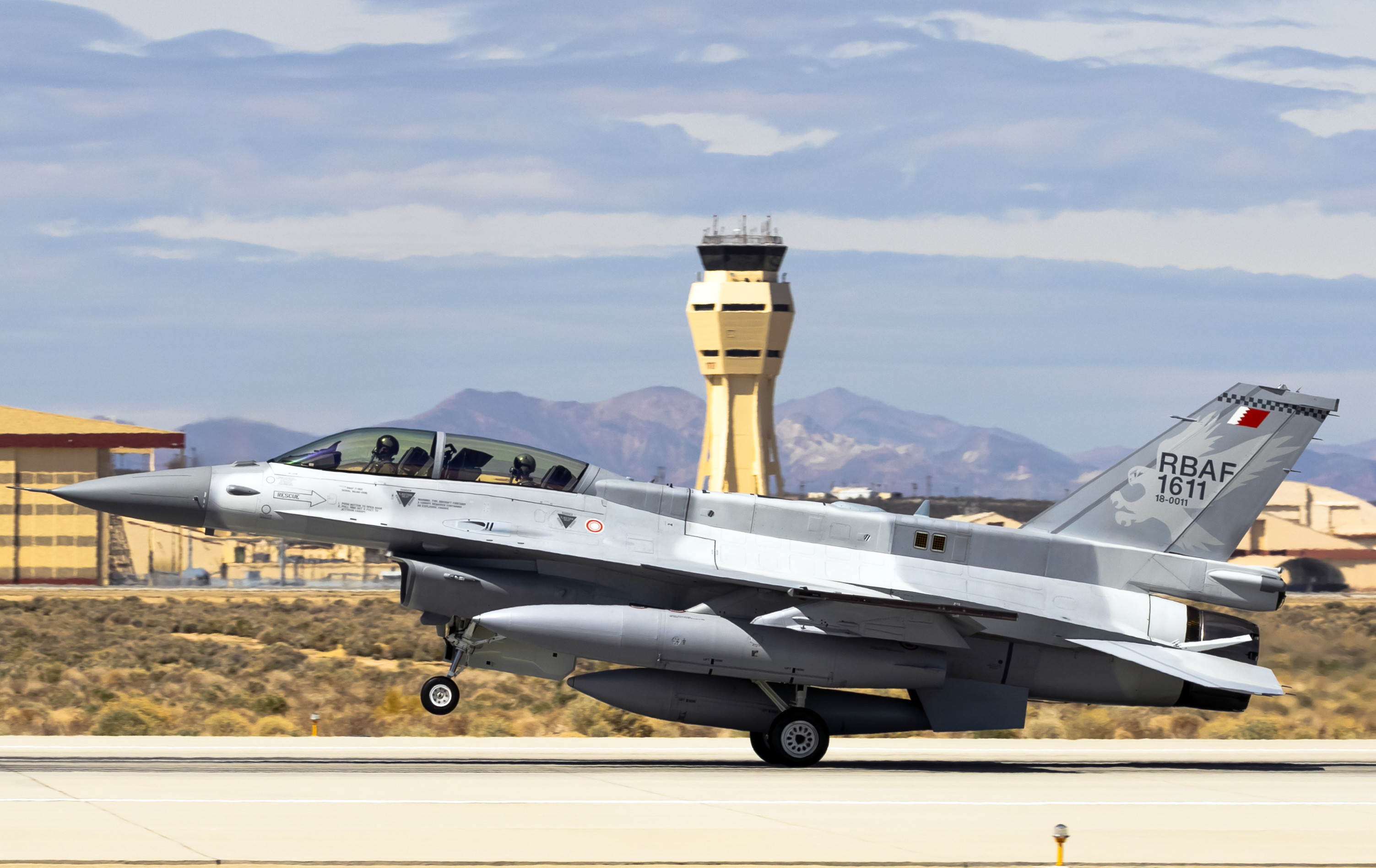
The first Royal Bahraini Air Force Block 70 F-16

=== Bahrain ===
The small country of Bahrain originally ordered the F-16 in 1987, agreeing to buy eight Block 40 F-16Cs and four F-16Ds under the PEACE CROWN program. These aircraft arrived prior to the first Persian Gulf War. After this, with the increasing military presence of the United States, Bahrain sought further enhancement of its air force and the replacement of its F-5 Tiger II fighters. Initial talks centered on the F-16N being withdrawn from service with the U.S. Navy and U.S. Marine Corps, but ultimately, it was decided to purchase ten new Block 40 F-16C aircraft. Bahrain ordered an additional 16 F-16 Block 70s in November 2017.

=== Egypt ===
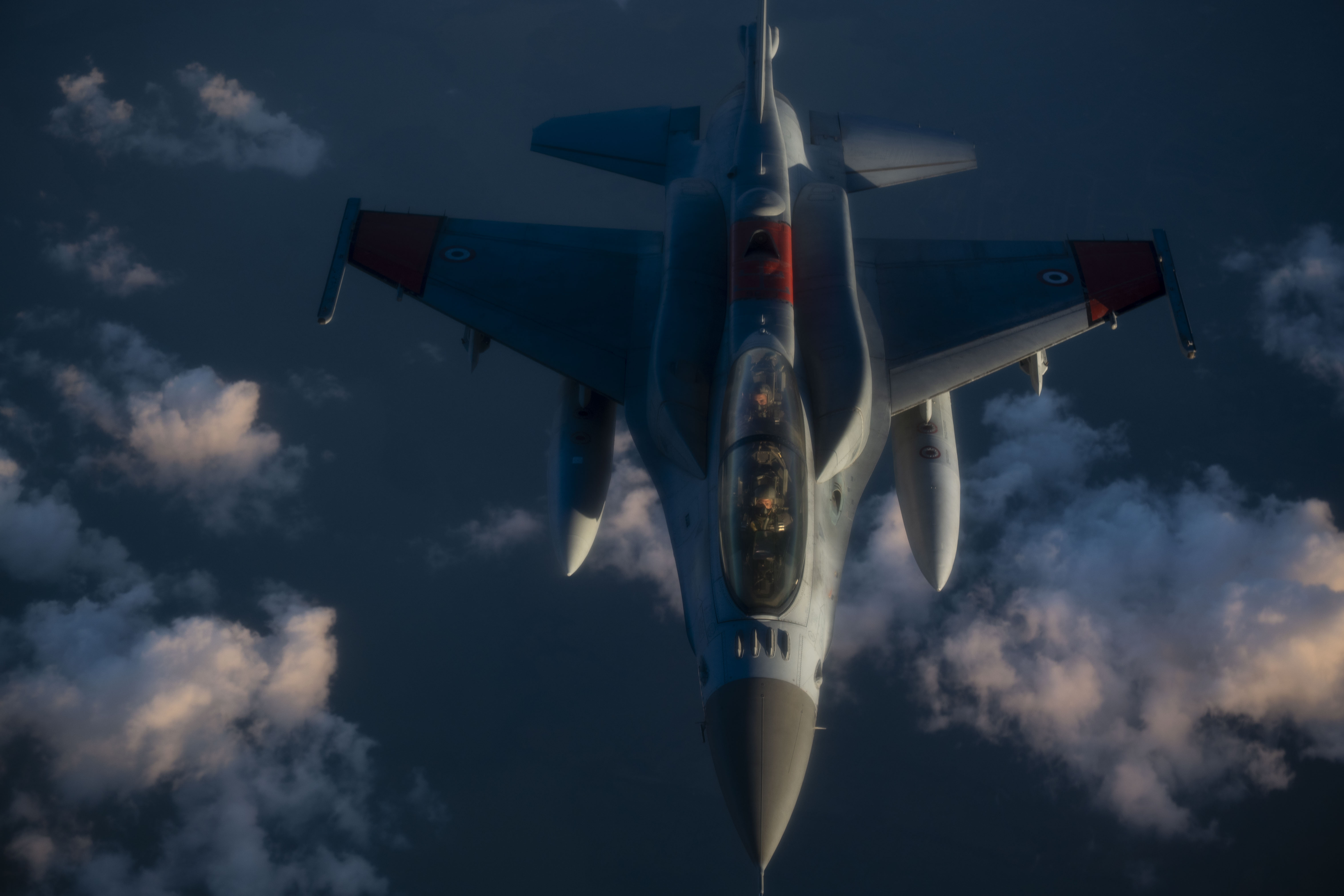
An F-16 of the Egyptian Air Force

After the Camp David Accords, Egypt actively sought to re-equip its military with western weapons. Thus, it has become a large customer for the F-16 Fighting Falcon. No fewer than 42 F-16A/B Block 15, 40 F-16C/D Block 32, and 138 F-16C/D Block 40 fighters had been delivered to the Egyptian Air Force by 2002, in the frame of six separate PEACE VECTOR programs. In March 2010 it was announced that Egypt would purchase an additional 20 Block 52 aircraft (16 F-16Cs and four F-16Ds). The Egyptian Air Force operated 220 F-16s at that point, making it the world's fourth largest F-16 operator. Four of the F-16s ordered were delivered on 3 February 2013, raising the number of aircraft delivered to 224. The remaining 16 were to be delivered through 2013. Following the 2013 Egyptian coup d'état, the Pentagon had said deliveries of the jets would continue. On 24 July 2013 however, President Barack Obama announced the F-16 deliveries would be halted due to continuing political unrest. In March 2015 the US announced the resumption of the deliveries of the F-16s, the last of which was delivered in October 2015.

=== Israel ===
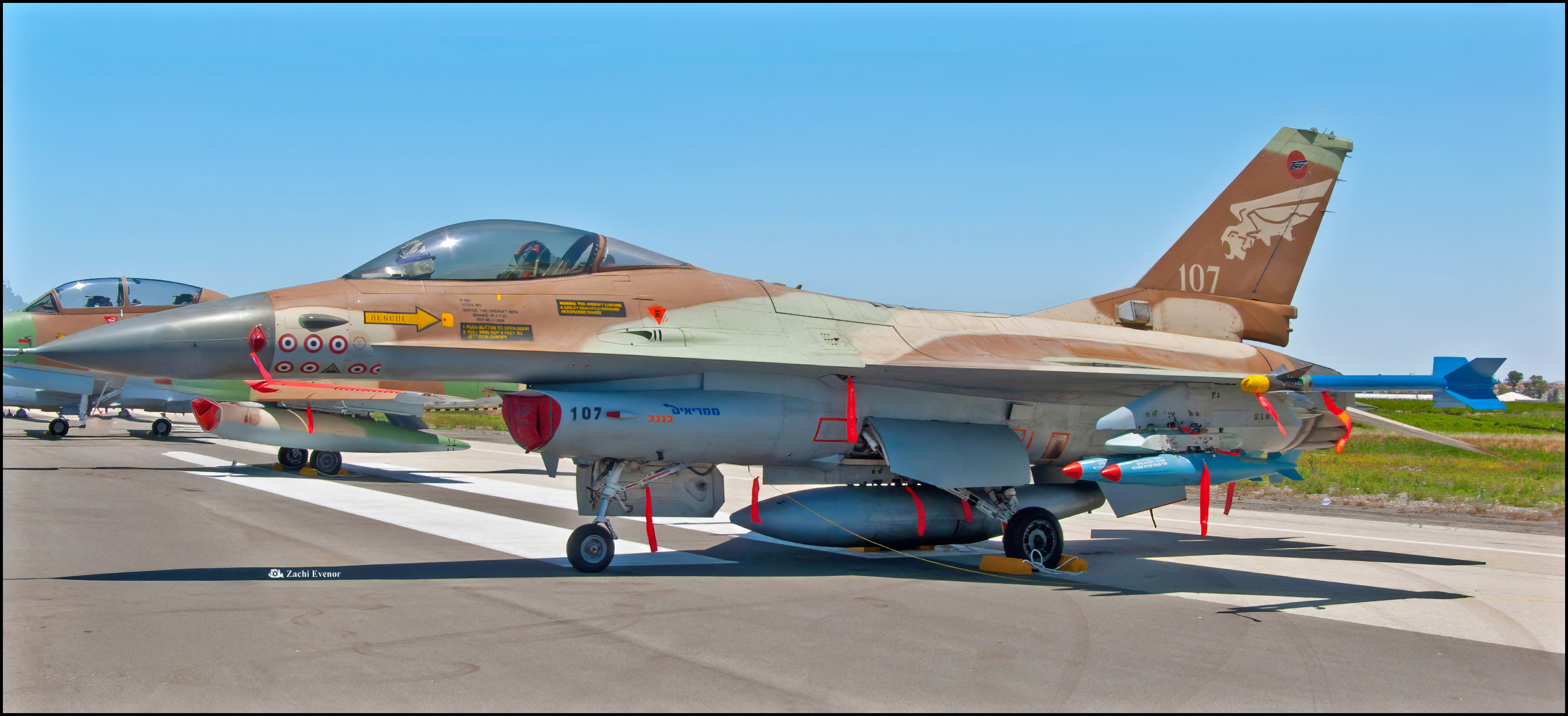
IAF F-16 Netz 107

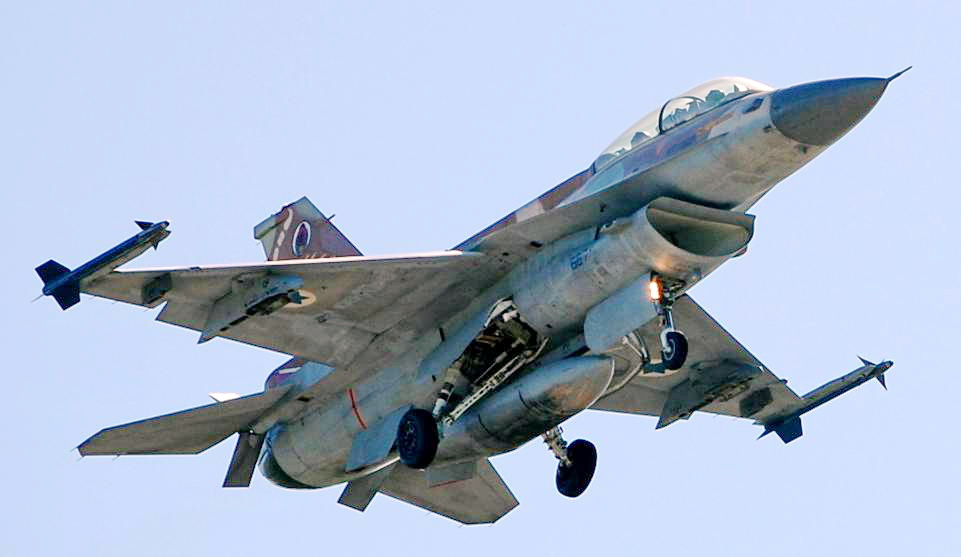
IAF F-16D

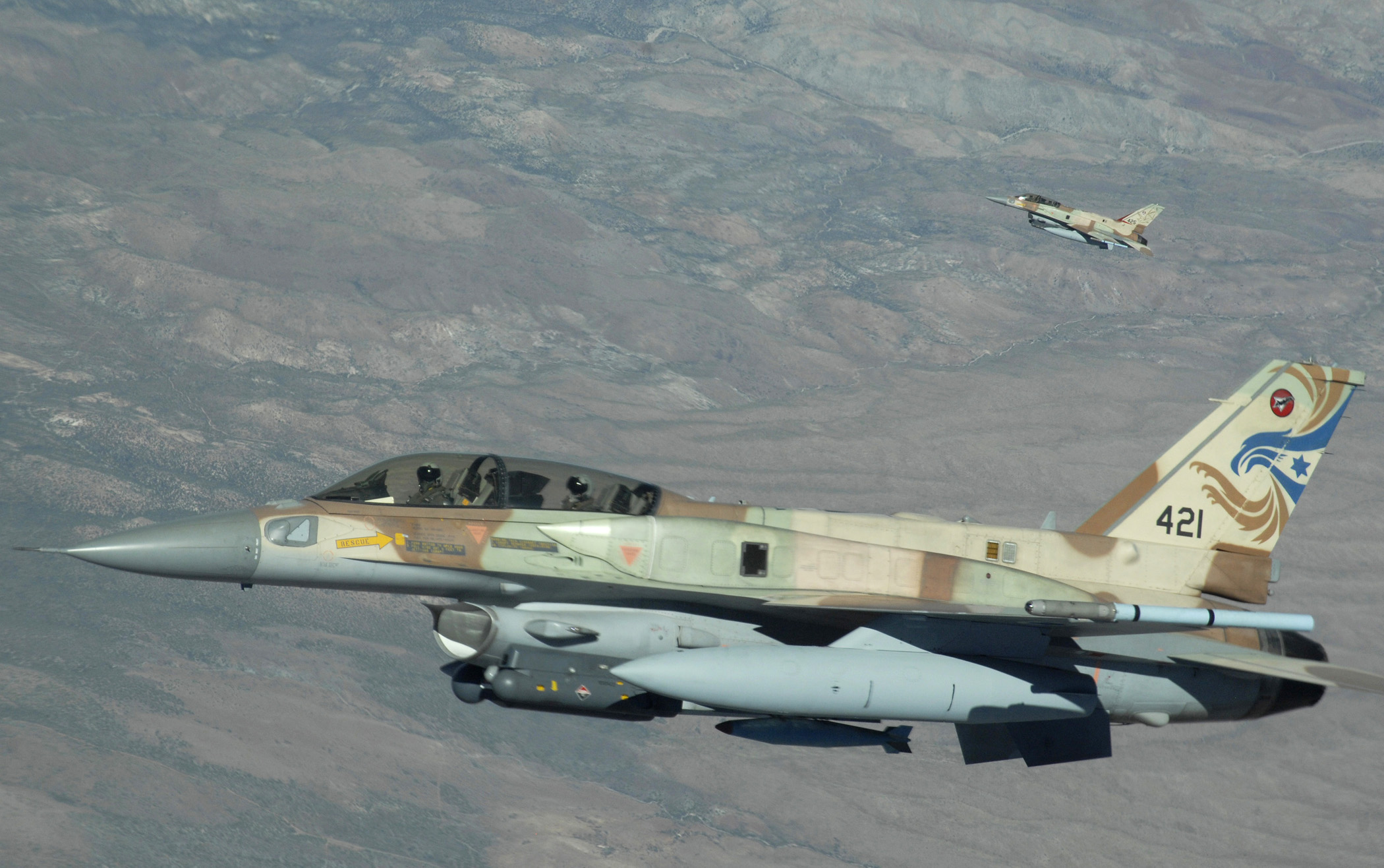
IAF F-16I Sufa

The Israeli Air Force (IAF) is the second largest user of the F-16 Fighting Falcon, second only to the U.S. Air Force and its reserve components. The IAF achieved the type's first air-to-air victories when its F-16s shot down two aircraft, a Mil Mi-8 helicopter and a Mikoyan-Gurevich MiG-21 fighter plane, both Syrian, in April and July 1981 respectively.

The IAF took delivery of its first F-16s earlier than expected after the cancellation of the sale of F-16s to the Imperial Iranian Air Force. The IAF had announced plans to buy 75 F-16s as early as 1978, and deliveries were carried out under American Foreign Military Sales program Peace Marble I. These F-16A/Bs received the Hebrew nickname "Netz" (Hawk). Peace Marble II witnessed the delivery of a further 75 block 30 F-16C/Ds to the IAF. Israel's F-16 fleet was further expanded by Peace Marble III, which brought 30 block 40 F-16Cs and 30 two-seat F-16Ds to the IAF between 1991 and 1993. These newer models were nicknamed "Barak" ("lightning"). In part to reward Israel for its restraint during the Gulf War, a shipment of 50 US-surplus F-16As and F-16Bs were delivered in 1994.

In a deal worth $4.5 billion, Israel also ordered 102 additional block 52+ F-16Ds, designated F-16I and nicknamed "Sufa" (Storm). Deliveries of these took place between 2004 and 2009.

In July 2013, Israel began a program called Teuza (boldness) for the purpose of turning some military bases into sales lots for obsolete IDF equipment. Older F-16 models would be sold off, or sold for scrap if there were no buyers. Main buyers were expected from Latin American, Asian, and African countries. Later that month, Major General Amir Eshel ordered the immediate shutdown of two squadrons of F-16A/B fighters, without any earlier notice to the squadrons' air and ground crews. The shutdown was caused by cuts in defence budget; additionally, it was claimed that one F-16I could replace several F-16s of older models. The aging F-16A/Bs were planned to be decommissioned in 2017 with the arrival of the F-35 Lightning II. However, the decision was made to advance the retirement of these aging platforms. One F-16A/B squadron continued to serve as an advanced jet trainer unit until the deliveries of Alenia Aermacchi M-346 Masters began in 2014. The final F-16A/Bs were retired on 26 December 2016.

On 16 July 2024, The IAF retired its last single-seat F-16C Block 30 "Barak I" fighters; the newer F-16C Block 40 "Barak II" fleet remains in service.

=== Iraq ===
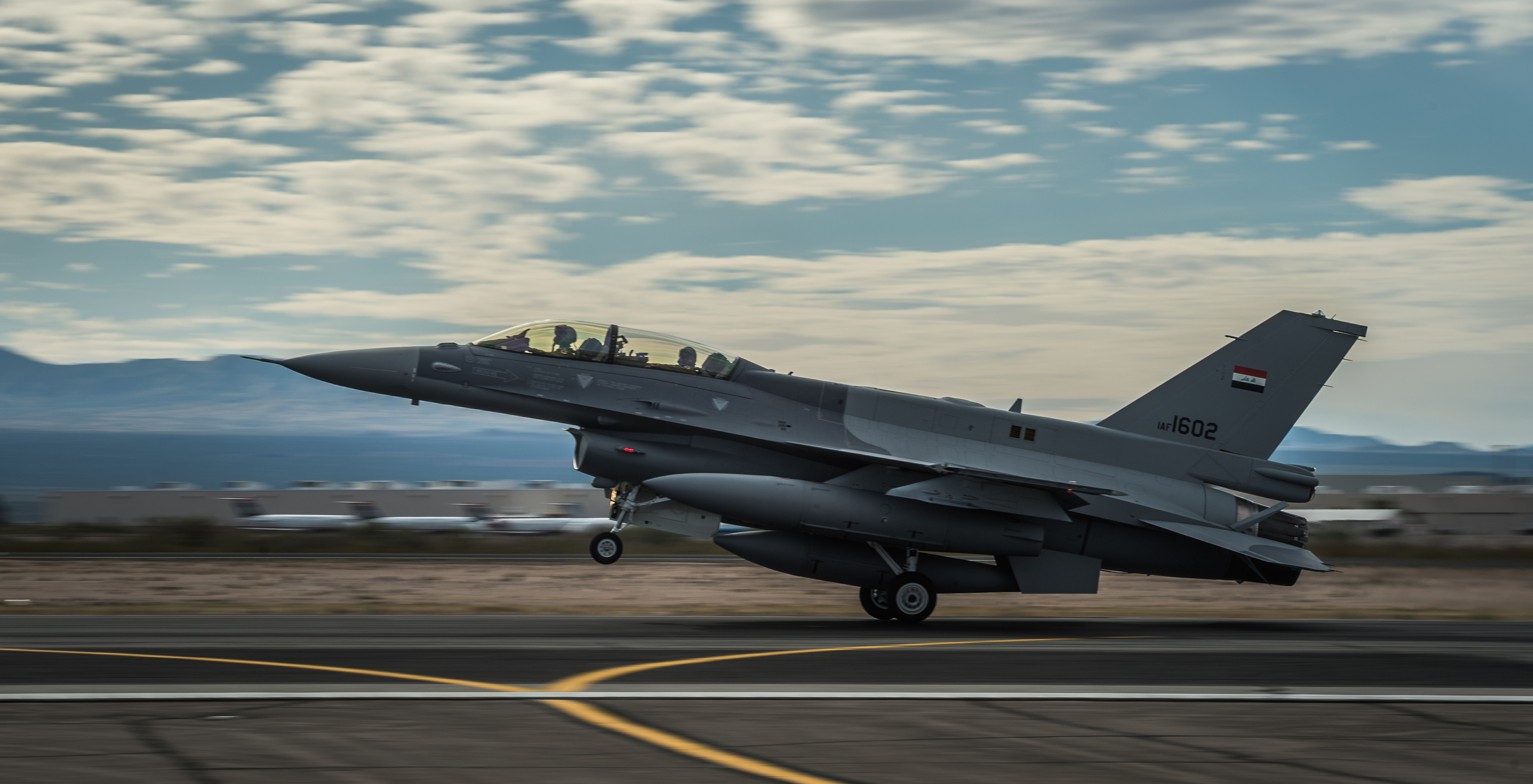
Iraqi F-16D in Tucson, Arizona, on 16 December 2014

The Iraqi Air Force was looking to buy 36 F-16s in late 2008 in place of phased-out Russian and Chinese fighters Saddam Hussein's regime acquired before and during the Iran–Iraq War. In the spring of 2009, the decision was made to spend $1.5 billion on an initial order of 18 F-16 fighters. Later purchases could bring the total buy to 96. The first batch was to be delivered by 2014, with all 36 currently ordered delivered by 2018.

The first F-16IQ Block 52 fighter was delivered to Iraq on 5 June 2014, making it the 28th country to receive the F-16. The fighter was the first of six two-seat F-16D models. F-16IQs can be armed with AIM-9L/M Sidewinder and AIM-7 Sparrow air-to-air missiles, AGM-65 Maverick air-to-ground missiles, and Paveway guided bombs. Due to advances made by Islamic State militants in mid-2014 which forced the evacuation of contractors from Balad Air Base, Iraqi F-16s were sent to Tucson, Arizona, where Iraqi pilots trained on their aircraft. Four F-16IQs were delivered to Balad Air Base on 13 July 2015. The last F-16 was delivered to the Iraqi Air Force on 14 November 2017.

=== Jordan ===
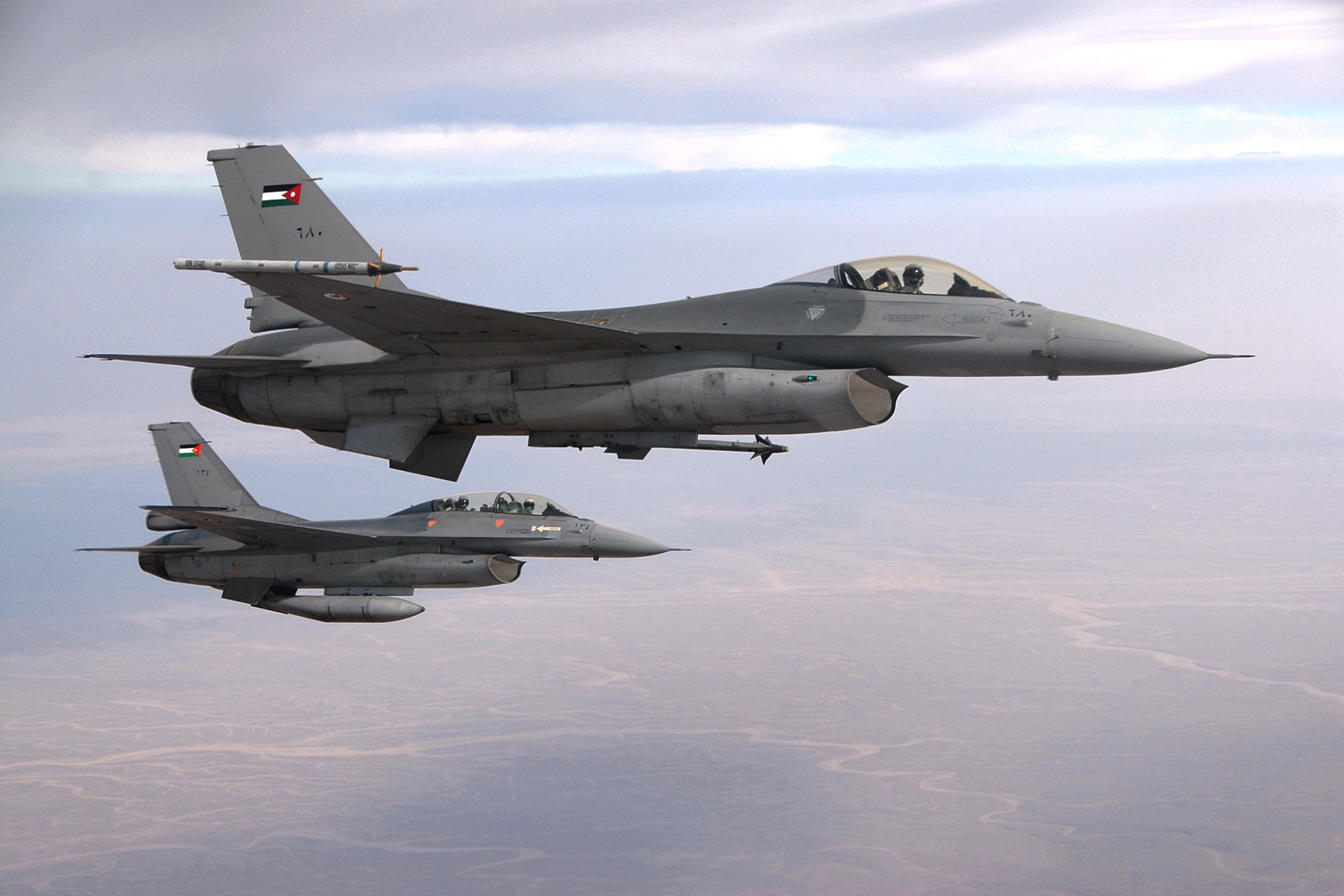
Royal Jordanian Air Force F-16 Fighting Falcon aircraft fighter pilots fly alongside a U.S. Air Force KC-135 Stratotanker aircraft while waiting to connect for fuel over Jordan October 19, 2009.

Like Egypt, Jordan opened the door to modern American arms sales by reaching a peace agreement with Israel in 1994. Jordan then arranged for a lease of air defense F-16s from the United States with an eventual transfer of ownership. The program was successful, providing Jordan with 16 F-16A/B ADF fighters in 1997 and 1998 under Peace Falcon I program, RJAF recognized the need to give these aircraft a mid-life update (MLU) in the next 2 or 3 years. (2 F-16A Block 15 ADF aircraft crashed over the years of service). A second Peace Falcon II program delivered a further 17 aircraft of similar type. All of the 17 F-16A/B upgraded by TAI to F-16AM/BM MLU standard. In 2005, Jordan purchased 16 F-16AM/BM Peace Falcon III from Belgium. Later the Royal Jordanian Air Force (RJAF) pursued more second hand purchases in 2006 6 F-16BM Peace Falcon IV purchased from RNLAF, An additional 9 F-16AM/BM Peace Falcon V delivered in July/Aug 2011 from Belgium, the purchase totaled 31 aircraft, putting the RJAF in a good position with 62 F-16s.

==== Peace Falcon I ====
On July 29, 1996, a $220 million agreement was signed between the United States and Jordan authorizing the lease of 16 F-16 fighter jets (12 F-16A and 4 F-16B aircraft) to Jordan. This agreement, formally signed by Field Marshal Marei, chief of staff of the Royal Jordanian Armed Forces and Major General Ababneh, chief of staff of the Royal Jordanian Air Force, was linked to the Middle East peace process and close US-Jordanian relations. The complete material/training support agreement, known as the F-16 Peace Falcon Program, includes funding for aircraft structural upgrades, engine modifications, support equipment and spare parts procurement, and pilot/maintenance training.

The agreement consisted of two lease contracts and a Letter of Offer and Acceptance (LoA). The first lease was a no-cost lease for Jordan, covering 13 aircraft (12 A models and 1 B model, block 15 OCUs that were modified into ADF (Air Defense Fighters) versions. Under the Arms Export Control Act, the DOD was able to provide these aircraft at a no-cost lease because they had flown off over 75 percent of their life (i.e. more than 3,000 hour). Three of the B-model aircraft still had more than 25 percent of their life left and they fall under the second $4.5 million lease. Both leases cover a 5-year period. The LOA is for $215 million, covering all costs associated with upgrading those aircraft, doing the structural modifications to them, the engine upgrades, providing the support equipment, the logistics, the training.

The aircraft, all of which have flown previously by active Air Force and Air National Guard units, had been in storage for at least a year at the Aerospace Maintenance and Regeneration Center (AMARC) at Davis-Monthan AFB, Tucson, Arizona before they were shipped to Hill AFB, Utah. There the Aircraft Directorate personnel from the Ogden Air Logistics Center performed structural upgrades to extend aircraft life from the designed 4,000 to 8,000 hours flying time as part of the Falcon-Up/Service Life Improvement program. They also modified the aircraft engine bay to accept the upgraded Pratt and Whitney F100-220E engine. New ground was broken with this Foreign military Sales program: taking 'used' F-16s from the desert (AMARC), completely refurbishing and modifying them and delivering the aircraft to the customer within a 17-month time frame.

On October 14, 1997, Lt. Col. Scott Curtis, flying safety officer at Hill AFB, pushed the throttles forward and released the brakes on his F-16 Fighting Falcon aircraft. Within a matter of seconds the aircraft accelerated to 140 knots and the first Jordanian F-16 (tail number #80-0547) was airborne. It took more than 13,000 man-hours to get this F-16 ready for its first flight. The #80-0547 had not flown since November 1994, when it was flown from the ANG Station in Garden City, N.J. to the Aerospace Maintenance and Regeneration Center, Davis-Monthan, Arizona. The official roll-out of the Peace Falcon was on October 28, 1997, on Hill AFB, Utah.

The Jordan program required that six aircraft be available for ferry flight delivery to Jordan in December 1997, and five each to be available for ferry flight in January and February 1998. At that time, the RJAF planned to acquire as much as 60-70 F-16s (if possible C/D models), enough to equip 3 squadrons.

==== Peace Falcon II ====
There have been talks about a second batch of 16 refurbished F-16s, which would have been delivered under the Peace Falcon II program. After initial talks in 1999, no further news has become available about this program. The RJAF is still looking for a replacement for its obsolete F-5 fighters which are due within a couple of years. They are in favor of acquiring another batch of F-16s for this replacement.

On January 29, 2003, numerous sources indicated that Jordan received six F-16 fighters that day in a ceremony held at Shahid Muafaq Al-Satlti AFB. This ceremony was attended by Prince Faisal bin Hussain and US Ambassador Jordan Edward W. Gnehm. The US embassy in Amman stated that these six aircraft were the first of a batch of another 17 (12 F-16As and 5 F-16Bs) that would be delivered to Jordan during the year 2003. All these aircraft are former US ANG F-16 ADFs. These aircraft are to be upgraded with the MLU modification (See Modifications and Armament).

Ultimately, 16 A-models and 1 B-model were delivered to the RJAF. Most of those airframes were put into storage waiting for their MLU conversion. In 2008 these modifications were in full swing at the TUSAS facility in Ankara, Turkey. By 2009 all of those modified airframes will be delivered back to Jordan for operational use.

==== Peace Falcon III ====
In 2005 the RJAF contacted the Dutch and Belgian governments for a batch of F-16s. In April 2006 representatives of both air forces flew to Amman to sign a Letter of Intent for the acquisition of up to 22 ex-Dutch (8 airframes) and ex-Belgian (14 airframes) F-16s. The lot would consist of 17 A-models and 5 B-models (Netherlands: 5 A-models, 3 B-models; Belgium: 12 A-models, 2 B-models). All these aircraft have undergone the MLU upgrade which gives the Jordanians a serious boost in air power and also a sneak preview of the possibilities they will gain after their entire fleet is upgraded with this package. The aircraft are due to be delivered in 2007–2008.

In 2009 a total of 16 Belgian F-16s (12 As and 4 Bs) were delivered, but the Dutch order for A-models was canceled. By that time it became apparent that only the 3 B-models of the first purchase from the Netherlands and the 3 B-models included in the second purchase would be handed over to Jordan during 2009 as part of Peace Falcon IV.

==== Peace Falcon IV ====
The Dutch Secretary of Defence announced at the Dubai Air Show in November 2005 that he had signed a Letter of Intent for the purchase of 3 F-16Bs by the RJAF. The aircraft were to be used as training assets and are due for delivery in 2006.

In the end, the number of F-16BMs was raised to 6. The delivery of those was postponed until the summer of 2009.

==== Peace Falcon V ====
In 2009 the Belgian government decided to put another 9 F-16AMs for sale. The first country to respond was Jordan and negotiations have been ongoing till 2011. Finally the delivery consisted of 6 F-16AMs and 3 F-16BMs, all delivered in July 2011. The number of Jordanian F-16s rises to 64 airframes with this delivery.

On 24 December 2014, a Jordanian F-16 crashed in Syria after being allegedly shot down by ISIS. The pilot, First Lieutenant Mu'ath Safi Yousef al-Kasasbeh, was captured by ISIS militants. On 3 February 2015, a video posted on ISIS-linked Jihadi websites, showed al-Kasasbeh being burned alive.

==== Block 70 ====
In January 2023, Jordan ordered 12 F16 Block 70 fighters in a deal worth an estimated $4.21bn; deliveries are expected to begin in 2027.

=== Oman ===
In May 2002, the Sultanate of Oman signed an agreement with the U.S. government to purchase 12 Advanced Block 50 F-16s in the PEACE A'SAMA A'SAFIYA ("Clear Skies") Foreign Military Sales (FMS) program. The agreement includes eight single-seat F-16Cs and four two-seat F-16Ds. On 23 August 2010 Peace A'sama A'safiya II contract was signed which saw a further ten F-16C and two F-16Ds delivered in 2014.

=== United Arab Emirates ===
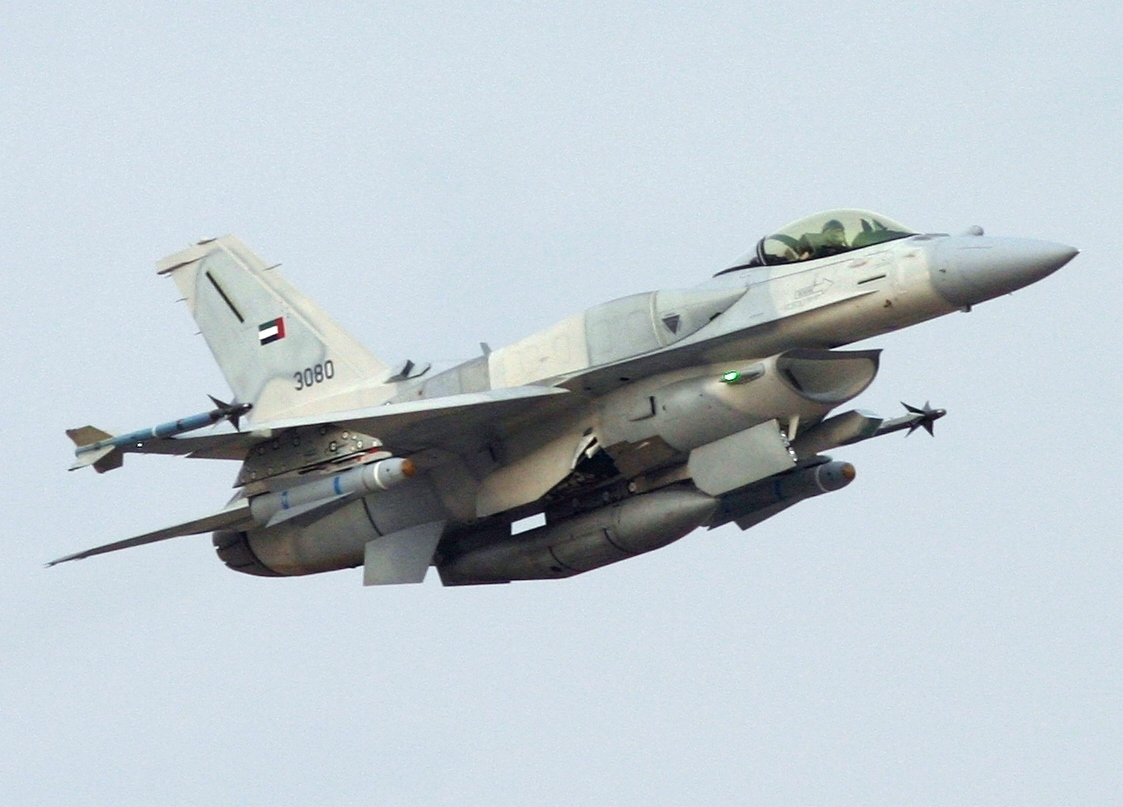
A United Arab Emirates Air Force F-16E Block 60 with the Northrop Grumman IFTS pod, conformal fuel tanks, and various external armaments taking off from the Lockheed Martin plant in Fort Worth, Texas.

The United Arab Emirates operates the newer F-16 variants, the F-16 Block 60 F-16E (single seat) and F-16F (two seat), unofficially called the F-16 Desert Falcon. The aircraft has been developed especially for the United Arab Emirates Air Force (UAEAF) and features improved AN/APG-80 active electronically scanned array (AESA) radar, avionics, conformal fuel tanks (CFTs), and the more powerful General Electric F110-GE-132 engine. The United Arab Emirates invested in its development and generate royalty payment for operators buying it.

== Africa ==
=== Morocco ===
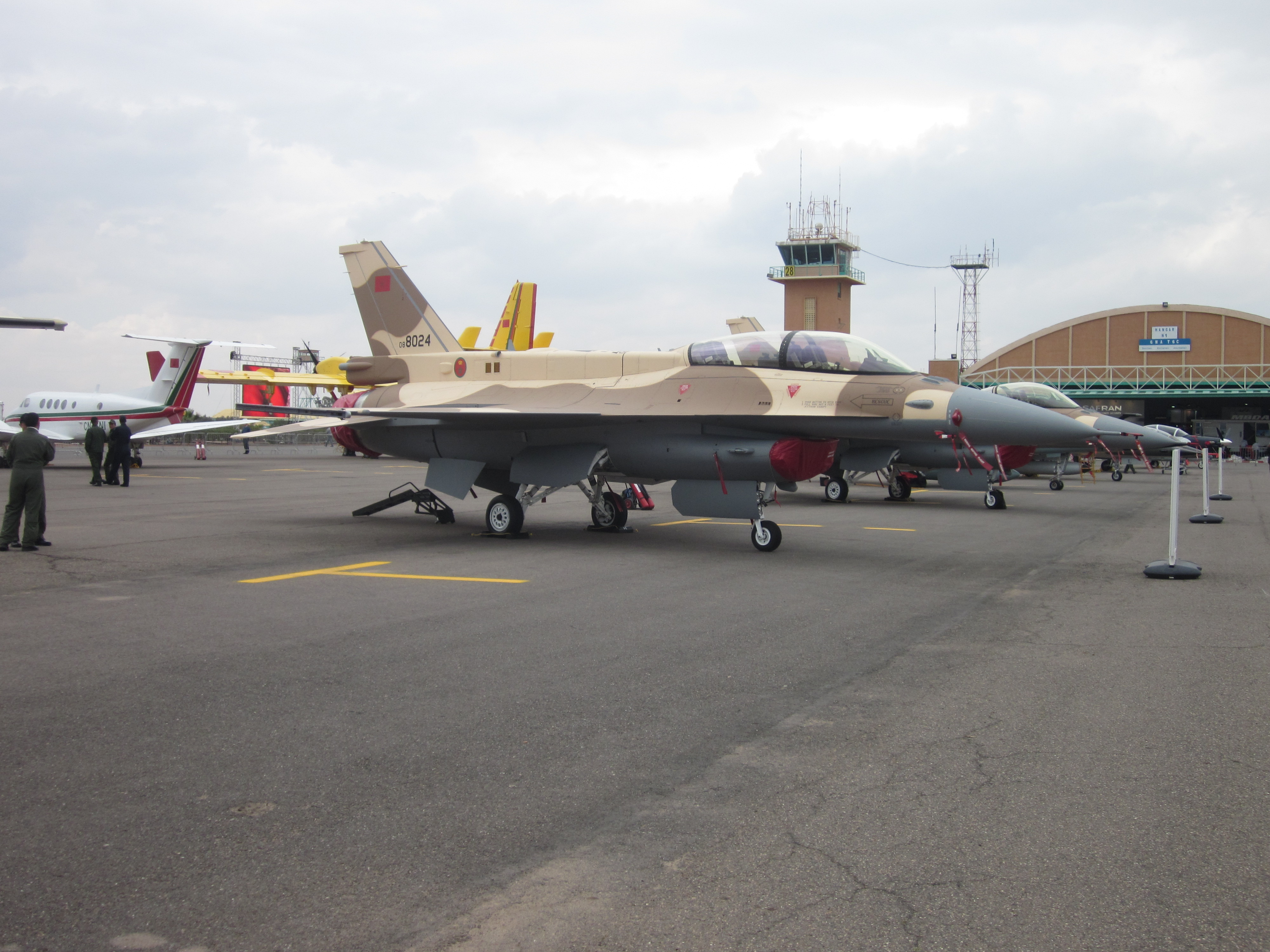
Royal Moroccan Air Force F-16 at the 2012 Marrakesh Air Show

The Bush administration announced plans to sell Morocco 24 F-16C/D fighters (alongside 24 Beechcraft T-6 Texan II trainer aircraft) valued at up to $2.6 billion on 27 December 2007. The sale was officially announced on 6 June 2008 and deliveries commenced in July 2011. All F-16s were delivered by the end of August 2012.

On 25 March 2019, the US government approved the sale of 25 new F-16 Block 72s and related equipment for an estimated cost of $3.787 billion, as well as an upgrade package to bring the 23 existing F-16 Block 52+ up to the very similar F-16V standard plus the related equipment for an estimated cost of $985.2 million.

== Asia ==
=== Indonesia ===
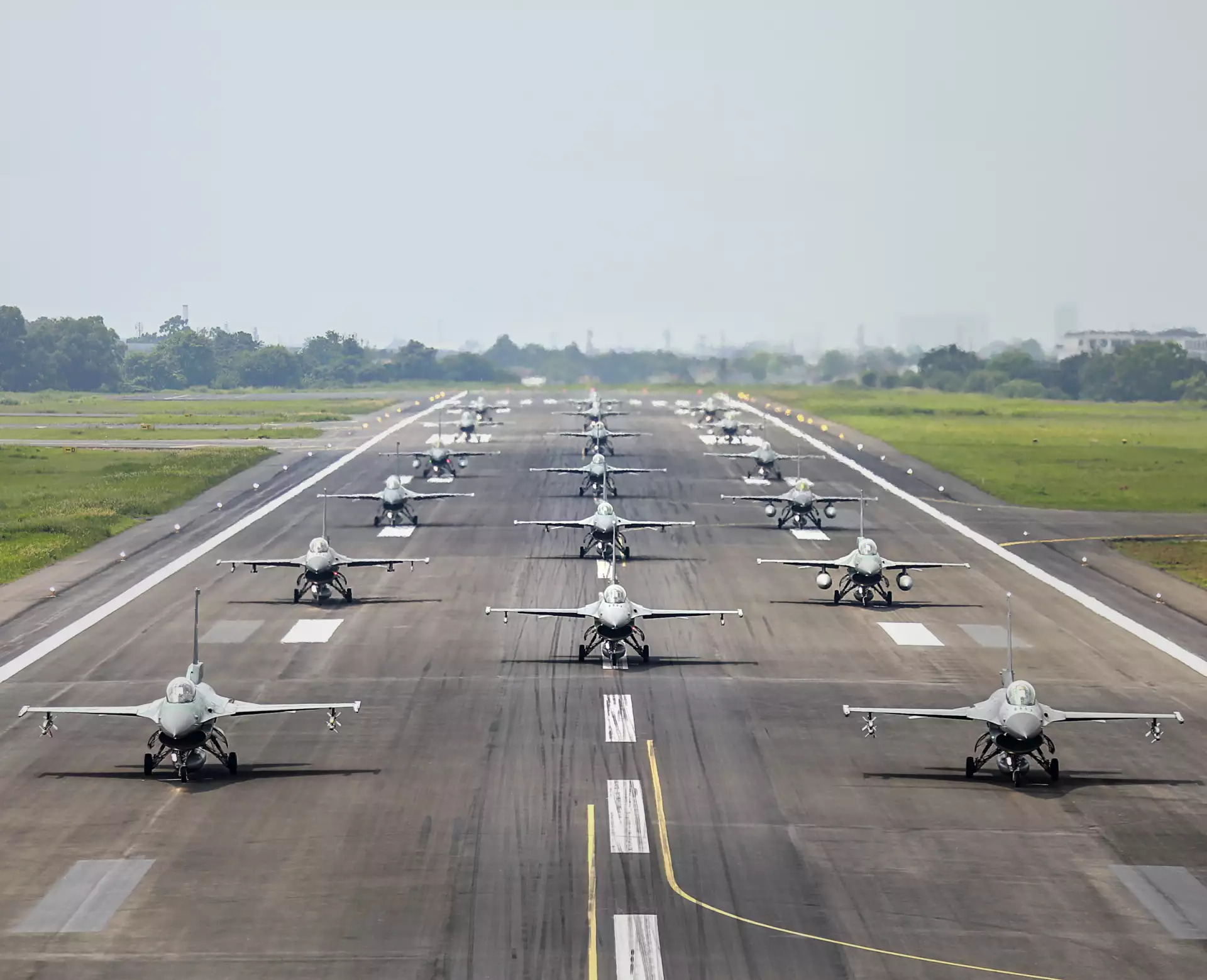
Elephant walk of Indonesian Air Force F-16s

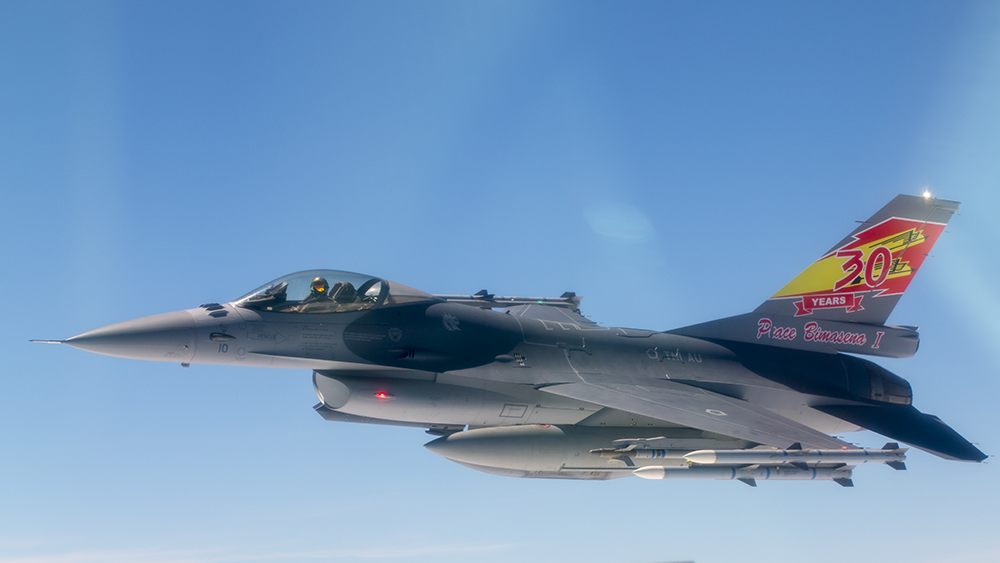
Indonesian Air Force F-16AM (TS-1610) after undergoing Falcon STAR eMLU program. Note the unique 30 Years Peace Bimasena I markings on the tail. 3rd Air Squadron

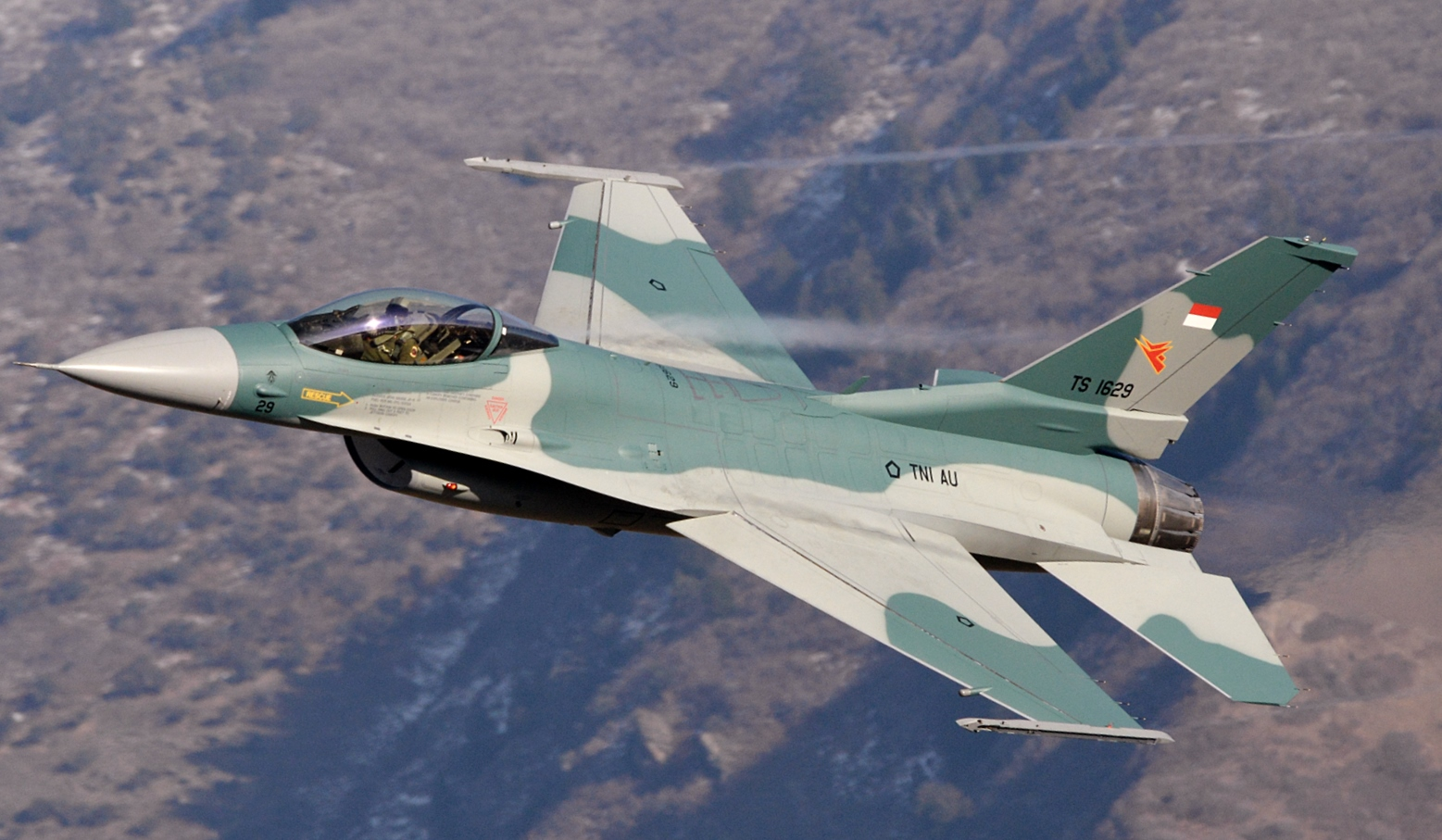
Indonesian Air Force F-16C Fighting Falcon at Hill Air Force Base. 16th Air Squadron

The Indonesian Air Force operates a mix of F-16A/B Block 15 OCUs (later upgraded to F-16AM/BM) and F-16C/D Block 32+s (locally promoted as Block 52ID or Block 25 Advanced). In mid 1980s, Indonesia was considering the F-16, Dassault Mirage 2000, and Panavia Tornado for its new fighter program. The F-16 was chosen and a US$432 million contract was signed in 1986. Starting in December 1989, Indonesia received a single allotment of eight F-16As and four F-16Bs. Two F-16A/Bs were lost in accidents leaving the fleet with only ten F-16s. In 1996, US offered Indonesia some or all of the 28 F-16s formerly belonging to Pakistan under the Peace Gate program for US$13 million each. A purchase of nine more aircraft was cancelled in favor of 12 Su-30KI, however this order was later also cancelled due to the Asian Financial Crisis.

Starting in 1998, the United States imposed an arms embargo on Indonesia, followed by the EU in September 1999, but the Indonesian F-16s were still operational and underwent a Falcon UP program with the assistance from Dutch companies, after the European Union lifted their arms embargo in January 2000. The US followed suit and lifted their embargo in 2005. The Indonesian Air Force was planning to upgrade its F-16A/Bs to F-16C/D variants by the end of 2009. Another option was to purchase new F-16C/Ds to replace the retired F-5E Tiger IIs still kept in reserve.

US offered Indonesia a grant of 24 F-16C/D Block 25, which was accepted by the Indonesian government in 2011. The 24 refurbished F-16C/Ds were delivered in July 2014–January 2018 period. The total estimated cost was $750 million, which included an upgrade to near Block 52 standard.

Starting in September 2017, Indonesia is upgrading its F-16A/Bs under the "EMLU-Falcon STAR" project, bringing it to the F-16AM/BM standard.

With the retirement of its F-5 Tiger IIs, the Indonesian Air Force was seeking additional airplane types well-suited for the air defense role. In February 2018, Indonesia signed a purchase contract to buy 11 Sukhoi Su-35 fighters in a US$1.1 billion deal. However On 22 December 2021 during a Press Tour and Media Gathering, Chief of Staff of the Indonesian Air Force Air Chief Marshal Fadjar Prasetyo has confirmed that the Su-35 purchase will not go ahead. Regarding the planned purchase of the Sukhoi Su-35, Fadjar said it would be abandoned. The 14th Air Squadron that was planned to use the Su-35 were given F-16s instead from existing 3rd and 16th Air Squadrons, while the Sukhoi Su-27/30 were given back to the 11th Air Squadron.

Lockheed Martin was offering the F-16V Viper as a cheaper alternative. The Indonesian Air Force has plans to purchase 32 F-16V Block 70/72s in 2020-2024 for the MEF (Minimum Essential Force) Phase III program, but the Ministry of Defense is interested in purchasing F-15EXs and Dassault Rafales instead.

The Indonesian Foreign Military Sales program is known as Peace Bima Sena.

- 31st Air Wing - Roesmin Nurjadin Air Force Base, Pekanbaru, Riau
  - 16th Air Squadron "Rydder" - F-16C/D
- 32nd Air Wing - Iswahjudi Air Force Base, Madiun, East Java
  - 3rd Air Squadron "Dragon" - F-16AM/BM
  - 14th Air Squadron "Eagle" - F-16C/D

=== Pakistan ===
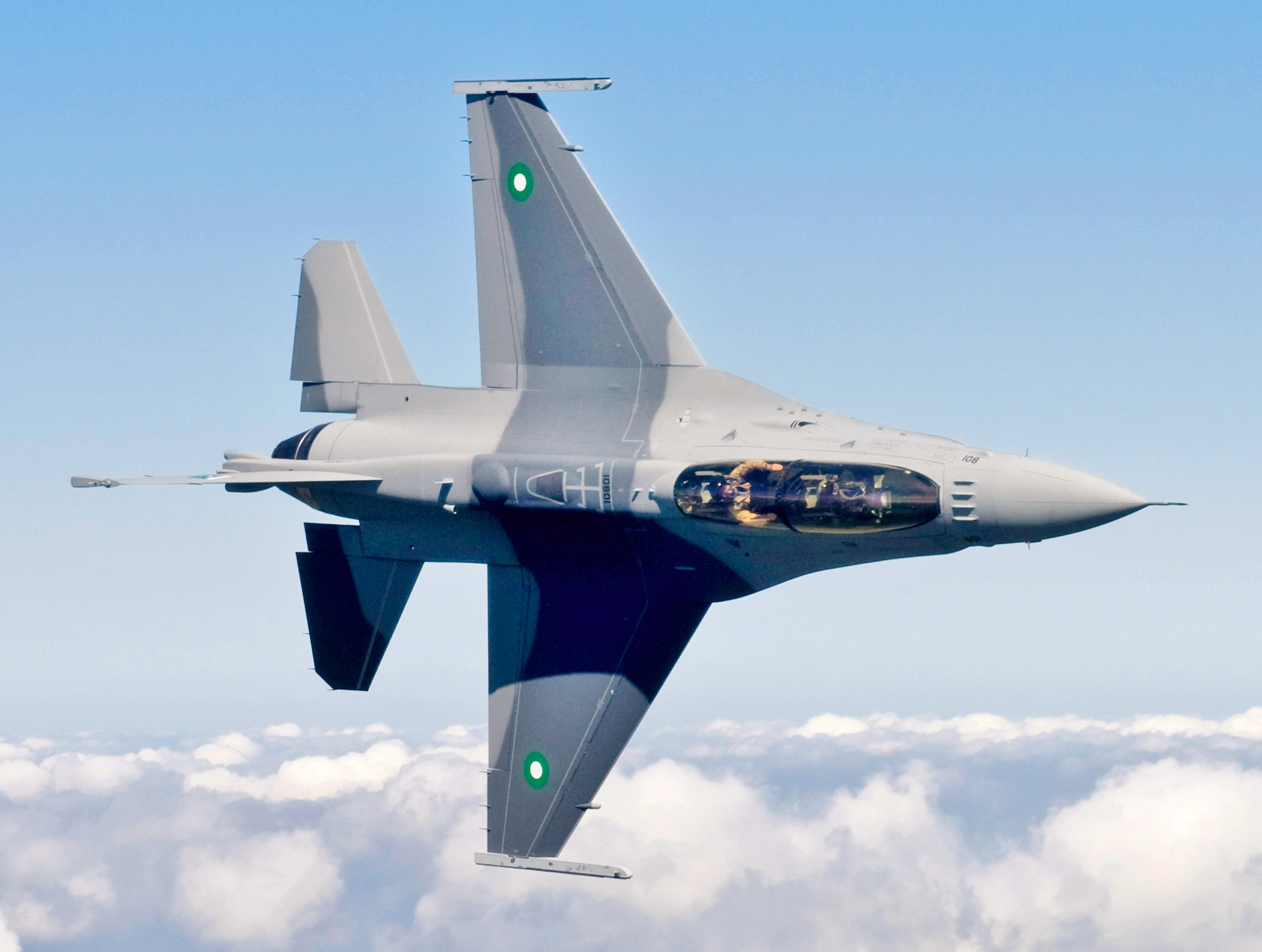
The first of the Pakistan Air Force's new F-16D Block 52 fighters, rolled out on 13 October 2009, undergoing flight testing in the United States prior to delivery.

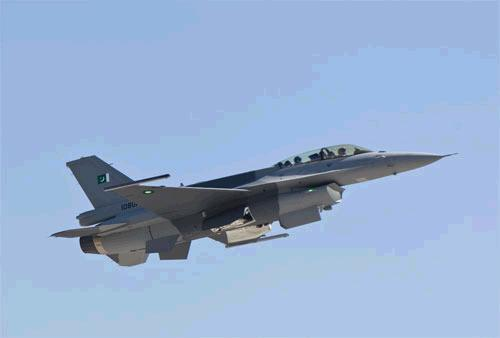
Pakistan Air Force's new F-16D Block 52 inflight.

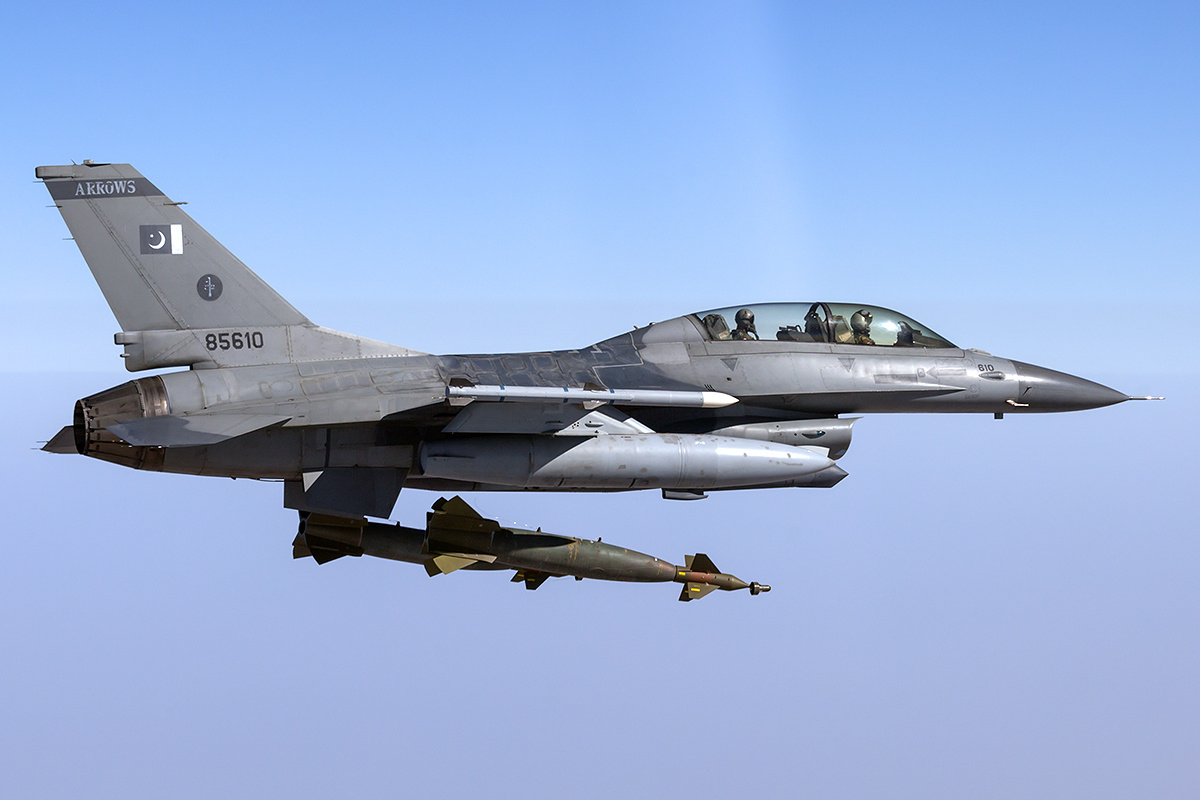
Pakistan Air Force F-16BM Fighting Falcon drops two 2000lb GBU-10 Paveway IIs.

Pakistan was an early customer of the F-16, seeking to counter a heavy Soviet presence in Afghanistan, in addition to countering its traditional rival, India. An initial order for 40 aircraft was delivered in two installments, and led to a further order for 71 more F-16A/B Block 15 OCU aircraft. Due to political developments relating to Pakistan's nuclear program, these aircraft were embargoed before delivery. 28 remained in storage while other buyers were sought (and a 10-year lease to the Royal New Zealand Air Force fell through due to a change of government), but ultimately it was decided that the aircraft would be put into service with the US Air Force and Navy as aggressor aircraft. The remaining aircraft were not completed.

The Pakistani Foreign Military Sales program is known as PEACE GATE.

In November 2006, the Pakistan Air Force signed a Letter of Acceptance (LOA) for 18 new-built F-16C/D Block 52s, 28 F-16A/B Block 15s and 60 Mid-Life-Update M3 Tape modules/kits as part of a $5.1billion deal including fighter aircraft, their related infrastructure, training and ammunition. Deliveries of the F-16A/Bs were expected to begin in 2007, while the initial F-16C/Ds would likely be received sometime in late 2008 or early 2009. The procurement of new-built aircraft and the refurbishment and upgrade of 60 used and serving aircraft was expected to be complete by 2010–2012, as per the Pakistan Air Force Air Chief Marshal Tanvir Mahmood Ahmed. In April 2006, Jane's Defence Weekly reported that the PAF may procure an additional 18 Block 52 aircraft. In July 2007, Commander of Central Command Air Forces, Lieutenant General Gary L. North (U.S. Air Force), and another U.S. aviator flew a pair of F-16s to Pakistan for Pakistan Air Force.

In December 2009 the first F-16/D block 52 rolled out for PAF. The first batch arrived in Pakistan in May 2010, and 17 F-16C/Ds had been delivered to the PAF by the end of December 2010. One F-16D used for testing joined the PAF in 2012 along with two examples upgraded to MLU standards in the USA.

In April 2014, the PAF received a batch of five second-hand F-16s bought from Jordan, from an order for 13 aircraft.

In 2016, the US approved the sale of eight F-16 Block 52 (two C and six D models) to Pakistan for $700 million. Pakistan had hoped to acquire the 8 F-16s for $270 million instead, with the rest being subsidized by Coalition Support Funds, but the US declined to subsidize the sale, and the deal fell through.

In 2019, the US approved a $125 million deal with Pakistan to provide technical support to existing F-16s.

=== Singapore ===
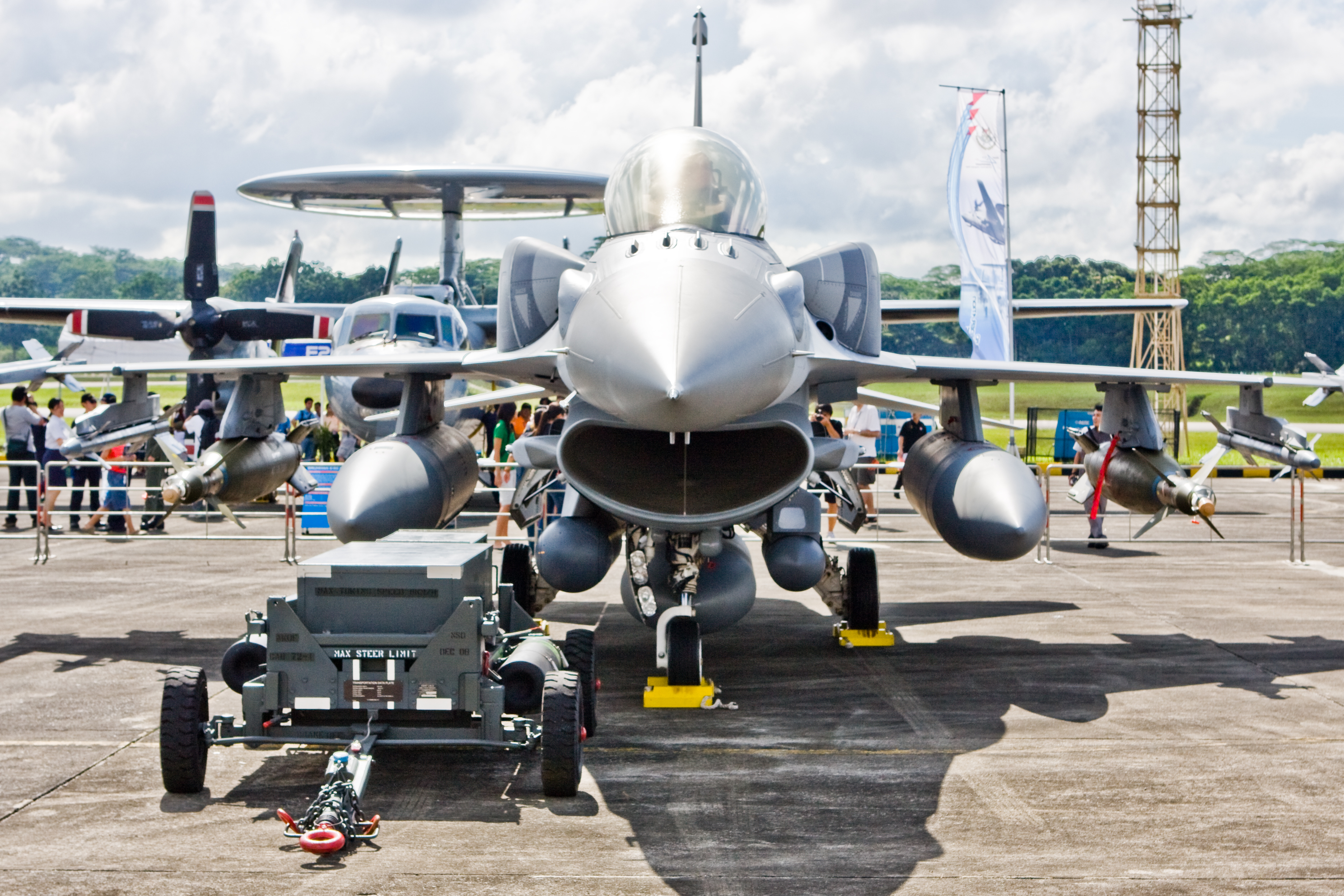
Singaporean F-16 Block 52+

The Republic of Singapore Air Force began as a small F-16 user, but has a steadily growing fleet. In March 1984, Singapore ordered eight F-16/79s. As the Pratt & Whitney F100-powered F-16s became available for export in mid 1985, Singapore revised its order to four F-16A and four F-16B Block 15 OCU under the Peace Carvin I program. The first aircraft was transferred in 1988 and were used for training at Luke Air Force Base in Arizona. The aircraft were delivered to Singapore in 1990. Soon after delivery in 1990, one F-16 was lost after a mid-air collision with another F-16.

Singapore ordered eight F-16C and ten F-16D Block 52 under the Peace Carvin II program in 1994, with the first aircraft received in 1998. Additional ten F-16C and two F-16D were ordered in 1997 and further twenty F-16D in 2000, under Peace Carvin III and IV programs respectively. These F-16s were delivered in 2000–2004 period. Singapore also leased four F-16C and eight F-16D for training at Cannon Air Force Base in New Mexico since 1998, with option to buy them. In 2004, seven F-16A/B Block 15 OCUs were donated to Thailand in exchange for training rights at Udorn Royal Thai Air Force Base.

In 2023, a Mid-Life Upgrade program worth US$1.1 billion was awarded to Lockheed Martin to upgrade Singapore's F16s with: AN/APG-83 Scalable Agile Beam Radar (SABR) Active Electronically Scanned Array (AESA) radar, Joint Helmet Mounted Cueing System (JHMCS), Python-5 missile integration, enhanced air-to-ground strike capability, datalink capability, and updated electronic warfare (EW) Suite. The upgrade program was completed in September 2023 and is expected to keep the RSAF F-16 fleet operational to the mid-2030s.

The Singapore Foreign Military Sales program is known as PEACE CARVIN.

=== South Korea ===
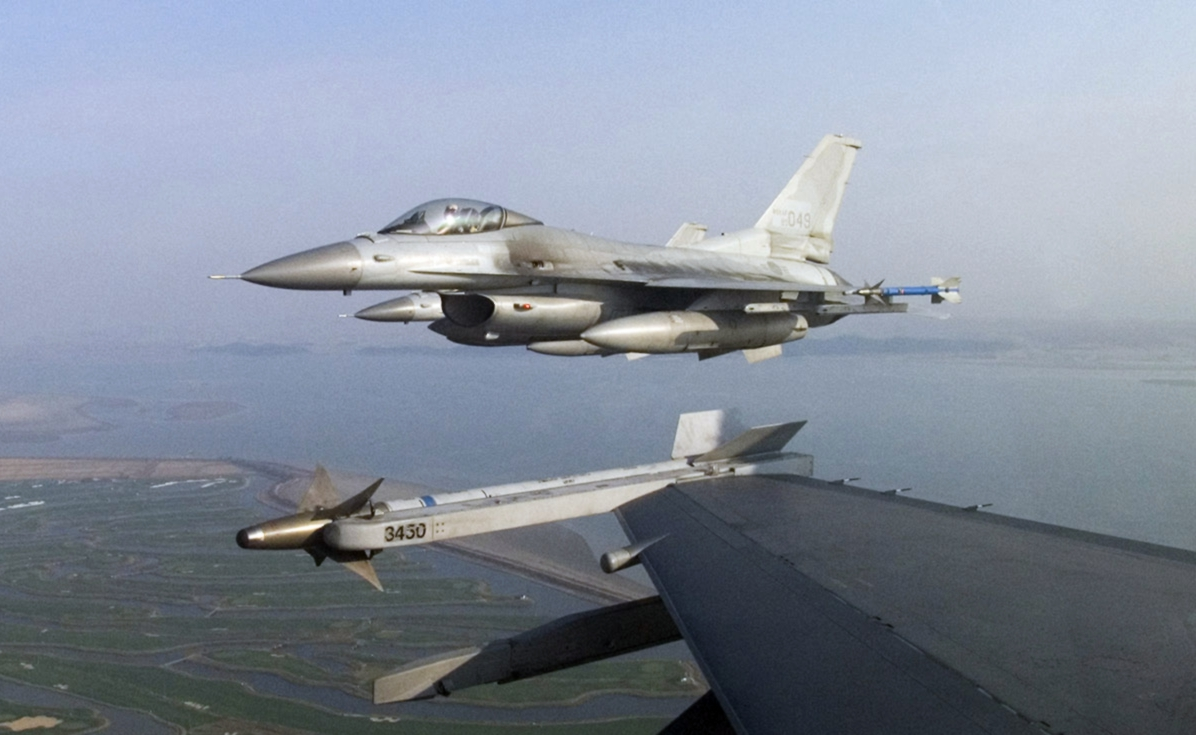
South Korean F-16s

Facing a need for advanced aircraft to counter North Korea's numerical superiority, the Republic of Korea Air Force ordered 36 F-16C/D Block 32 aircraft in 1981 (later four F-16Ds were added by profit from exchange rate fluctuation), making it the first operator of the C/D model outside of the United States. A more ambitious program (Korean Fighter Program) aiming to provide 120 new fighters was initially lost to the F/A-18 Hornet, but various difficulties led to the order going to the F-16C/D Block 52D (KF-16C/D), 72 of which were to be manufactured in South Korea. 36 of them were to be delivered in kit form and assembled in South Korea, and 12 were to be produced in Fort Worth. In 2000, a further 20 Korean-built F-16s were added.

The South Korean Foreign Military Sales program is known as PEACE BRIDGE.

In May 2009, the South Korean government announced an upgrade plan for its KF-16C/D fleet's radar and armament, as part of the 2010-2014 arms acquisition and management package being submitted to President Lee Myung-bak for approval. The ROKAF operates about 135 of the “KF-16” fighters, many of which were built in Korea under a $5.5 billion licensing agreement from 1994 to 2004. Key upgrades will include new radars to replace the existing APG-68v5/v7 systems, avionics and computers, and improving cabling and databuses to MIL-STD-1760 so that the aircraft will be able to carry GPS-guided weapons, AIM-9X Sidewinder missiles, and other new equipment.

In March 2014, the Republic of Korea Air Force revealed that it was considering leasing F-16s operated by the US Air Force. ROKAF F-4 and F-5 fighters were intended to be replaced through the F-X III competition by 2016 and the KF-X indigenous fighter, but F-X III deliveries were delayed until 2018 and the KF-X won't enter service until 2023. With the aging fighters still needing to be retired, between 20 and 60 American F-16s are being reviewed for leasing to sustain aircraft numbers. South Korea had previously leased US T-38 Talon trainers for over a decade until the completion of the KAI T-50 Golden Eagle, but a country leasing a combat fighter is very rare due to risk of increased costs if they need to be used in a conflict situation.

=== Taiwan (Republic of China) ===
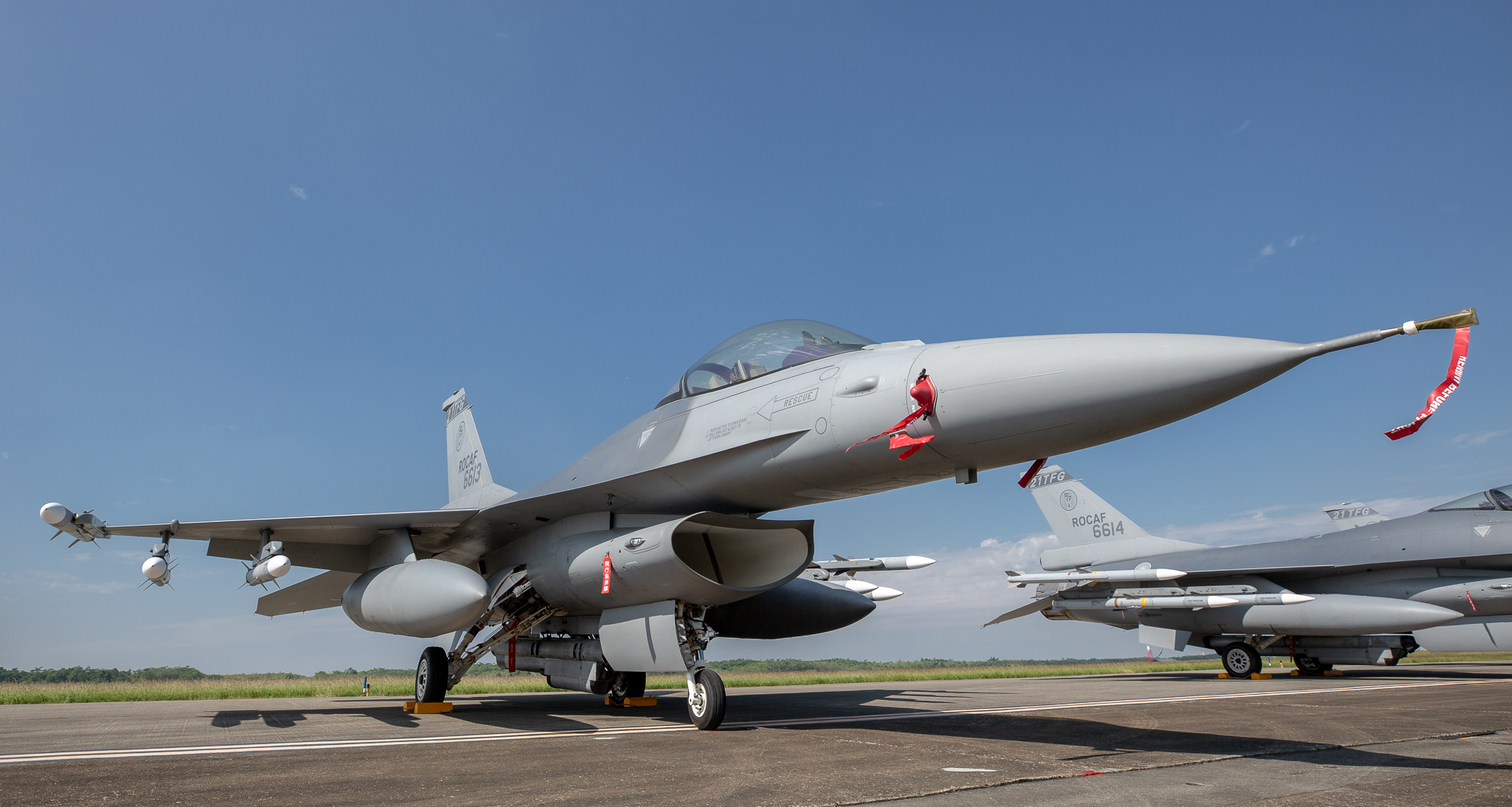
Upgraded F-16V fighter on display at Chiayi Air Base in Southern Taiwan.

Republic of China Air Force (ROCAF) is a major F-16 customer. In 1992, 150 F-16A/B Block 20s were ordered while at the same time Taiwan ordered 60 Dassault Mirage 2000s and launched its own indigenous fighter program, the AIDC Ching-Kuo. Delivery of all F-16s was completed in 2001.

Taiwan's foreign military sales program is known as PEACE FENGHUANG (Peace Phoenix).

President Barack Obama agreed to a $5.3 billion deal to upgrade Taiwan's current fleet of F-16A/B Block 20s to a configuration similar to that of the proposed F-16V standard with active electronically scanned array (AESA) radars. Taiwanese F-16Vs are being upgraded with the AN/APG-83 AESA radar and a helmet-mounted cueing system. In 2019, Taiwan received its first F-16V. Taiwan upgraded 42 F-16A/Bs to the latest F-16V standard and aims to upgrade rest of the 141 aircraft to the latest standard by 2023 as part of a $3.8 billion modernization plan.

The Republic of China Air Force (ROCAF), needing a next-generation fighter to replace its fleet of Northrop F-5s, has expressed interest in the new F-35 Lightning II. However, due to political issues, it is unlikely it will be able to acquire such an advanced fighter in the near future. As a result, the ROCAF has opted for up to 66 new F-16C/D Block 50/52 as its interim replacement fighter. As with all military purchases, Beijing has expressed opposition to the sale. In August 2019, the Trump administration approved the sale of up to 66 new F-16 Block 70s worth up to $8 billion to Taiwan; the first two were delivered on 2 October 2026. Taiwan has upgraded all of its F-16A/B Block 20 aircraft to F-16V standard by December 2023.

=== Thailand ===
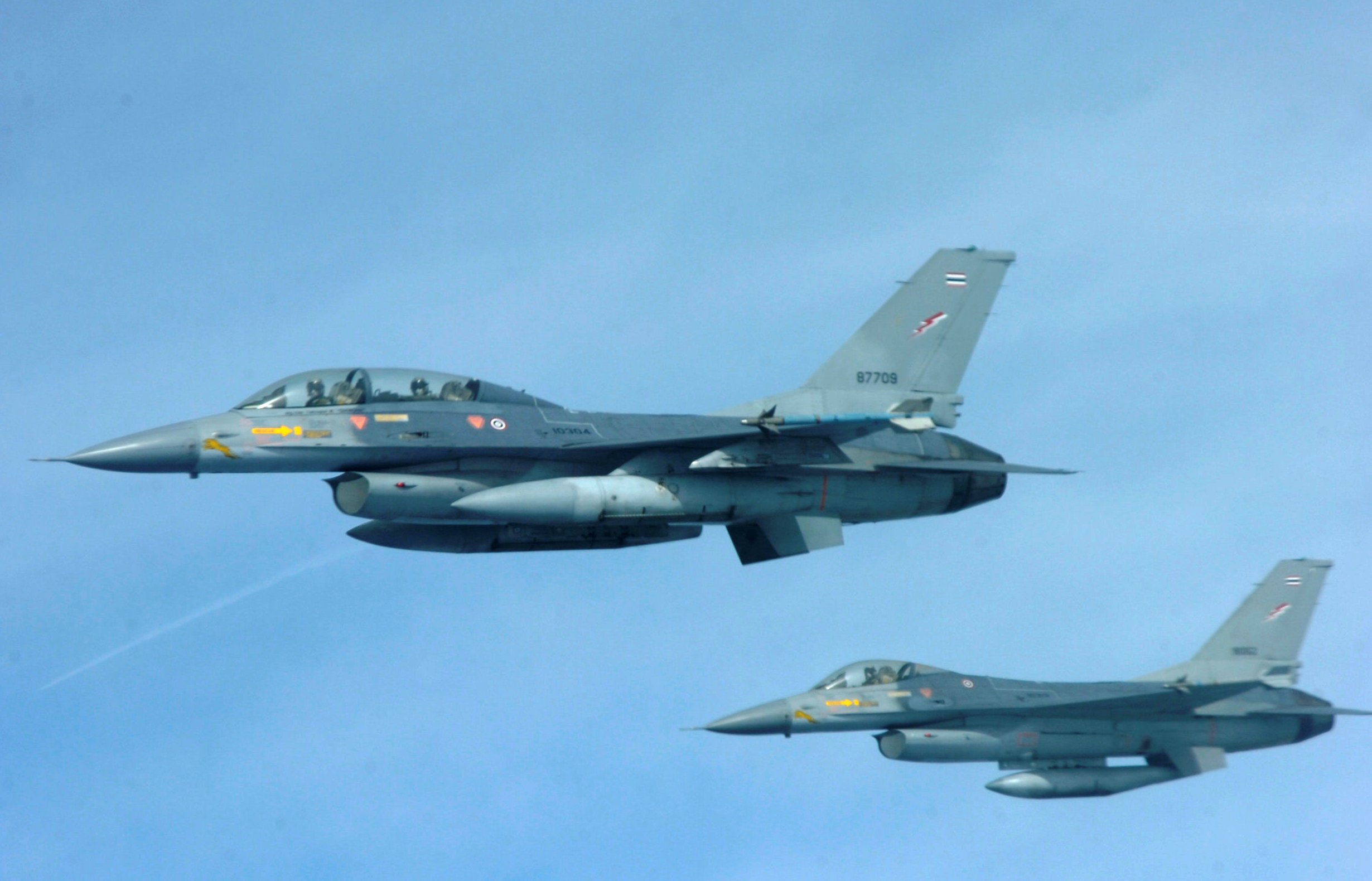
Two Royal Thai Air Force F-16 aircraft fly in formation March 17, 2009, as a part of the aerial missions of Exercise Cope Tiger in Korat, Thailand.

The Royal Thai Air Force was initially considered a candidate to purchase the F-16/79. Thailand's first order was for 12 F-16A/B Block 15 OCU fighters, immediately bolstered by a further six F-16A Block 15 OCU planes. 18 more aircraft were received in 1995, the last new-production block 15 aircraft built. An attempt to buy F/A-18 Hornets failed, and in place of them, the US offered to sell former USAF F-16 ADFs as Excess Defense Articles. A total of 18 aircraft were bought. In early 2005, the Royal Thai Air Force received three F-16A Block 15 OCUs and four F-16B Block 15 OCU from the Republic of Singapore Air Force. The Thai Foreign Military Sales program is known as PEACE NARESUAN.

In 2011, 18 F-16A/B Block 15 OCUs from 403 Sqd. will be upgraded to F-16 MLU standards.

The F-16A and F-16B are respectively referred to as B.Kh.19 (Thai: บ.ข.๑๙) and B.Kh.19A (Thai: บ.ข.๑๙ก) under the Thai designation system.

Units:

- 102 Squadron "Stars"
- 103 Squadron "Lightning"
- 403 Squadron "Cobra"

== South America ==
=== Argentina ===
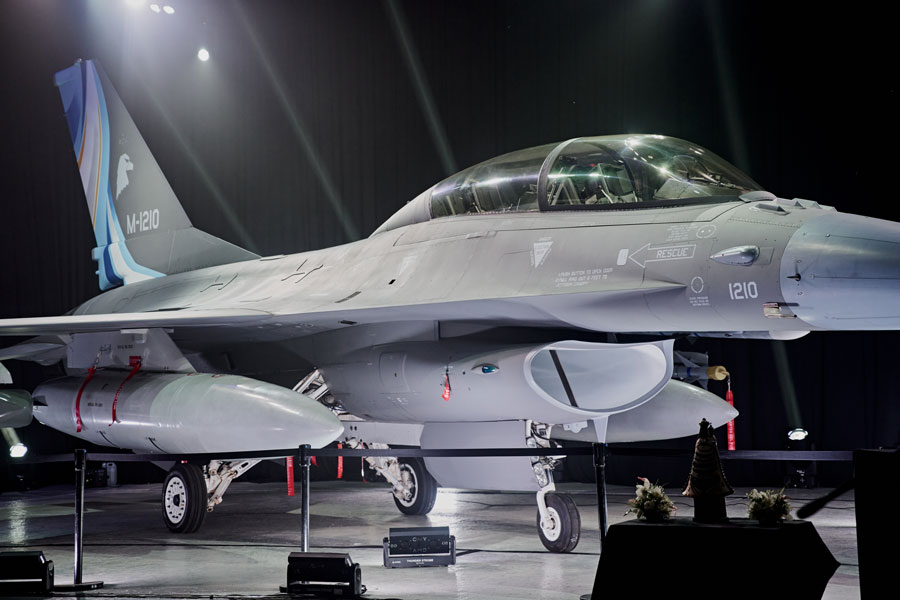
The first F-16 delivered to Argentina in 2024.

In November 2015, after freezing the purchase of IAI Kfir aircraft from Israel, the Argentine Air Force requested "price and availability" of the F-16 from the US as a "definitive" combat aircraft and the eventual acquisition should be decided in the future. However, no deal had been materialized by September 2020. On August 12, 2021, Argentina received an offer from SOUTHCOM Gen. Laura J. Richardson for a total of 26 F-16 Block 40s, with an additional 18 to be donated if the deal is closed. This deal comes alongside other offers by Chinese, Russian, and Indian delegations who have offered the JF-17/FC-1, MiG-35, and HAL Tejas respectively. In late November details had been released regarding the Argentine Air Force's interest in the F-16 as they had formalized in the short term with the United States a request for information regarding procurement of F-16 Block 50s instead of the older Block 40 previously offered. In late January 2022, details were released regarding a new deal to acquire the F-16. The Danish Air Force is currently in the process of retiring its F-16s in favor of the F-35, and Argentina is currently working alongside the American Foreign Military Sales program in order to procure 12 ex-Danish F-16A/B MLUs. The deal stands that each unit would cost approximately $15 million with personnel training and spare parts included. However, the deal as of late January 2022 does not include other weapons or sensor pods. The FAA is currently negotiating as well for the inclusion of a KC-135R to be added into the fighter deal to provide aerial refueling capabilities for the F-16. In July 2023 the Biden administration sent a notifications to the US Congress for authorization to sell up to 38 second-hand Lockheed Martin F-16 fighter jets to Argentine Air Force. the proposal includes 6 fighters in the Block 10 and 32 Block 15 versions, with a total value of $338,695,634.

On 26 March 2024, Argentina's and Denmark's Ministries of Defense signed a “letter of intent on the possible sale” of 24 F-16s (16AM and 8BM).

On 19 December 2024, the first ex-Danish F-16 arrived in Argentina; it was officially unveiled in Buenos Aires on 24 February 2025.

=== Chile ===
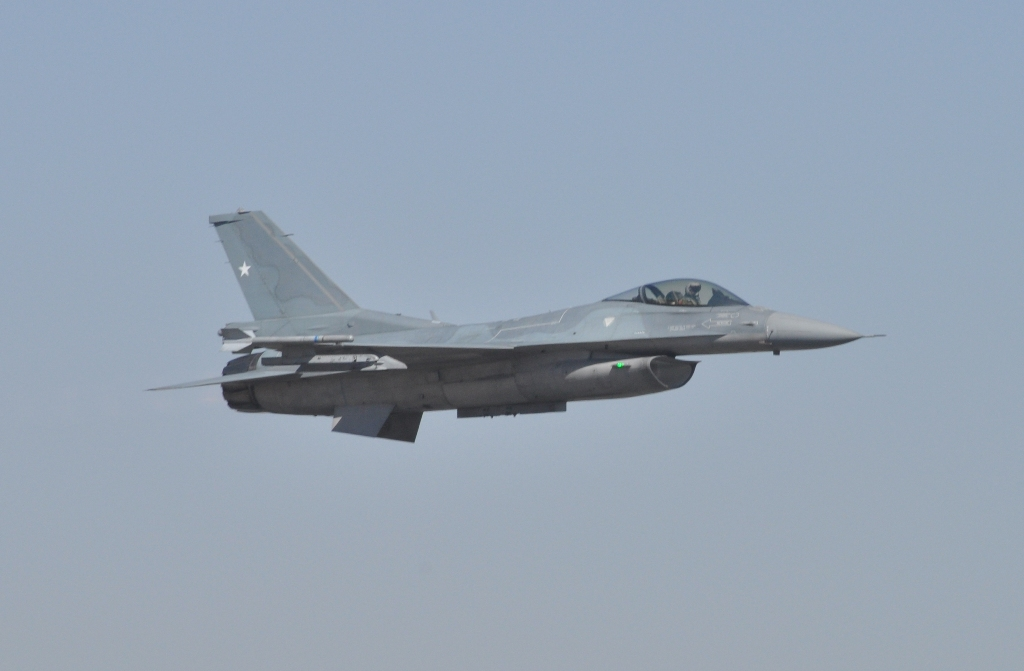
A Chilean F-16 Block 50+

The Chilean Air Force selected the F-16 as the winner of a long-running competition to provide the nation's next generation of fighter aircraft in 2000. The F-16 competed successfully against the JAS 39 Gripen, the Dassault Mirage 2000, and the F-18 Hornet. The deal for six C and four D-model aircraft was valued at $600 million in 2002 and was conducted under a program name PEACE PUMA. 18 surplus F-16A/B MLU aircraft (11 F-16AMs and seven F-16BMs) were bought from the Netherlands in 2005, and were delivered by mid-2006.

On 31 January 2006, the Chilean Air Force received the first of 10 F16 Block 50 fighters; part of a deal worth $320 million for six single-seat F-16Cs and four two-seat F-16Ds. The Chilean F-16 Block 50s can be armed with US missiles such as the AIM-120 AMRAAM and AIM-9 Sidewinder, and the Israeli-made Derby, Python IV and Python V.

In late 2008, the Chilean Ministry of Defense expressed its interest in buying 18 more aircraft from the Netherlands, which was later confirmed in April 2009.

The Chilean F-16s are part of the following units:

- 1st Air Brigade (I Brigada Aérea) in Los Condores Air Base.
  - 3rd Aviation Group (Grupo de Aviación Nº 3).
- 5th Air Brigade (V Brigada Aérea) in Cerro Moreno Air Base.
  - 7th Aviation Group (Grupo de Aviación Nº 7).
  - 8th Aviation Group (Grupo de Aviación Nº 8).

=== Venezuela ===
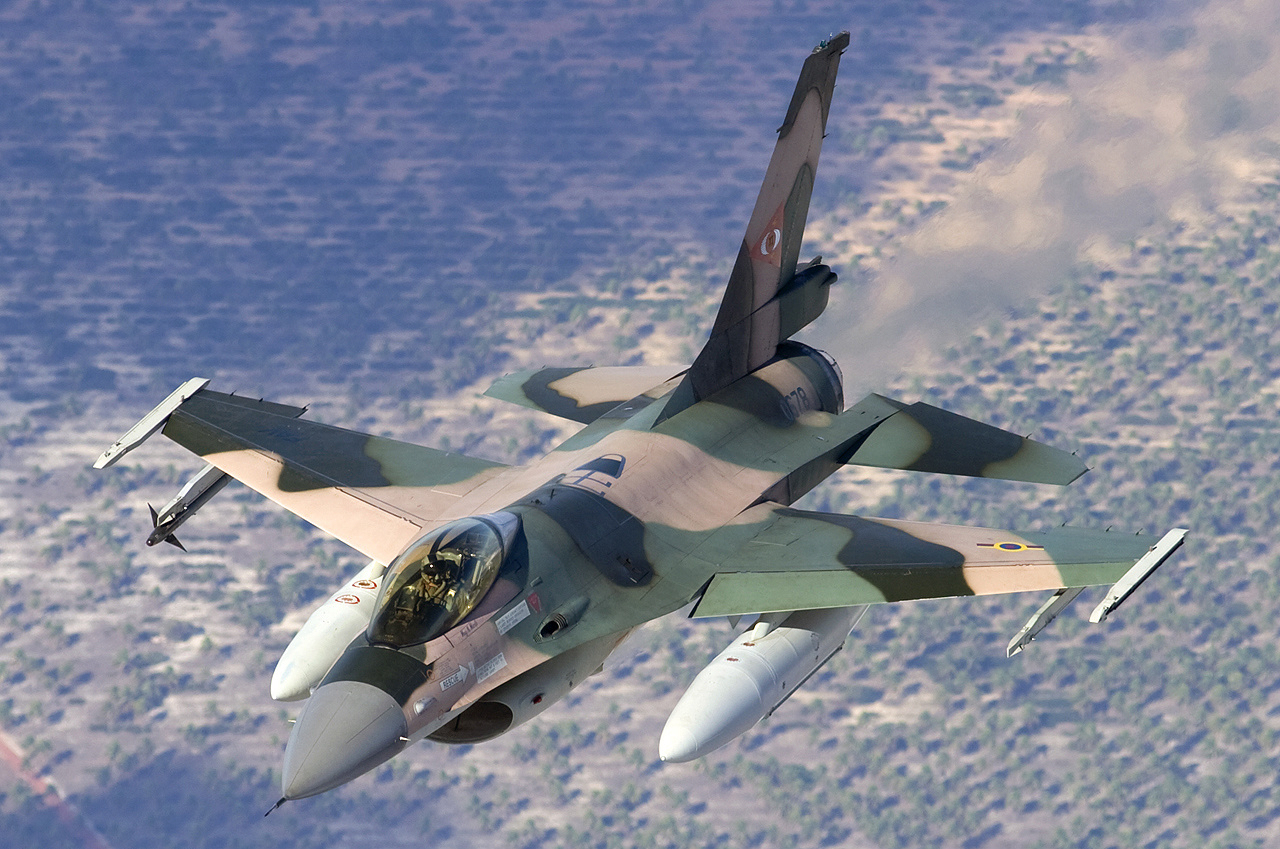
Venezuelan Air Force General Dynamics F-16A Fighting Falcon (401)

The first – and for a long time the only – Latin American user of the F-16, Venezuela ordered a total of 24 F-16A/B Block 15 aircraft in May 1982 under the PEACE DELTA program; the US government originally offered the F-16/J79 version, but eventually authorized the sale of the standard Block 15 version. Deliveries of 18 ‘A’ models and six ‘B’ models began in September 1983 and were completed in 1985. Since entering operational service in 1984, these fighters have served with 161st and 162nd Fighter Squadrons of Fighter Air Group 16 at El Libertador Airbase, Palo Negro. The Venezuelan Air Force had wanted to order a further batch of 24 aircraft, but was unable to afford the purchase.

Venezuela has been seeking two attrition replacements for lost F-16s since late 1997, but has not been able to obtain them due to financial problems and souring relations between the United States and the government of President Hugo Chávez. On 15 May 2006, the US government announced that it would enact a ban on arms sales to Venezuela to become effective at the beginning of October of that year. This embargo was expected to soon render Venezuela's F-16 fleet non-operational, and General Alberto Muller, a military advisor to President Chávez, responded to the embargo announcement with a threat to sell Venezuela's remaining 21 F-16s to Iran. Subsequently, the Chávez government decided to pursue replacement of its American-sourced military aircraft inventory with Russian aircraft, and in mid-June 2006 it was revealed that Venezuela had recently ordered several Sukhoi Su-30s.

Venezuela's F-16s have been modified to use the Israeli Python IV infrared-guided air-to-air missile. They are also capable of carrying the Rafael LITENING II targeting pod.

Operating Units	Model	Location
16º Grupo Aéreo de Caza "Dragones"		El Libertador Air Base, Palo Negro
Escuadrón de Caza 161 "Caribes"	F-16A/B Block 15	El Libertador Air Base, Palo Negro
Escuadrón de Caza 162 "Gavilanes"	F-16A/B Block 15	El Libertador Air Base, Palo Negro

== Former operators ==
=== Italy ===
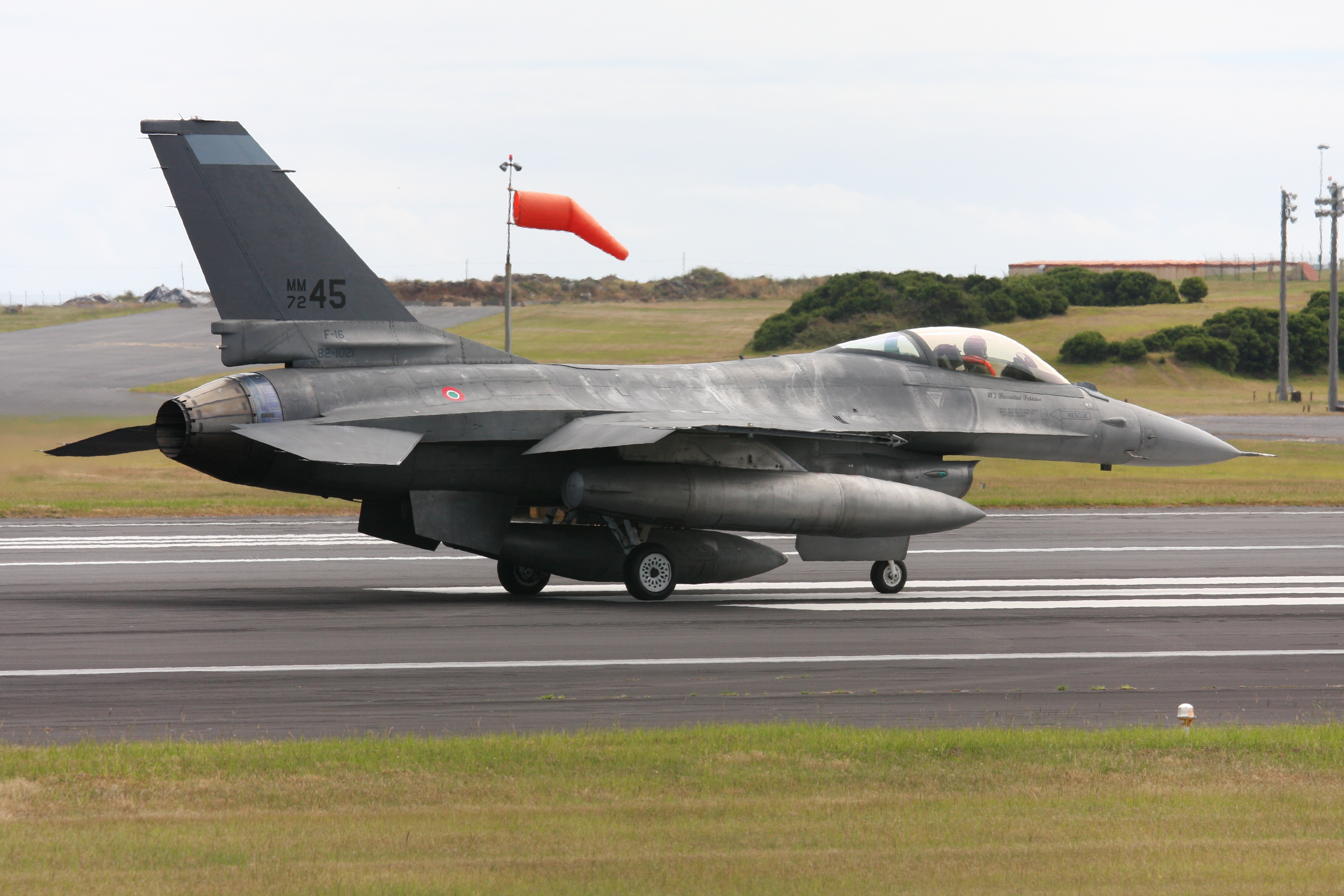
General Dynamics F-16 of the Italian Air Force

Italy decided on the Eurofighter Typhoon as its next generation of air-defense fighter, however this aircraft faced delivery delays for some time. In the meantime, 24 Panavia Tornado ADV jets from the United Kingdom were leased to cover the gap. This lease ran out in 2003, without the Typhoon being ready for service. The solution was provided by a five-year lease of 34 F-16s, with an option to extend the lease for another five years. Of the 34, 30 aircraft were F-16A/B Block 15ADFs while the remaining four were earlier-block aircraft for spares. These were all used US Air Force fighters.

In June 2010, the Italian Air Force started the return of the F-16s to the United States which was completed on 23 May 2012, when all the Italian F-16s were returned to the US.

The Italian Foreign Military Sales program was known as PEACE CAESAR.

=== Norway ===
Norway was one of the original 5 NATO partners participating in the F-16 program. On 6 January 2022, Norway announced that all of its F-16s had been retired, having been replaced by the Lockheed Martin F-35 Lightning II. In the 1970s, Norway needed a replacement for the F-104 Starfighter and later on the F-5 which had been in service since the 1960s. Norway participated in a collaboration with Denmark, the Netherlands and Belgium to choose a new combat aircraft. Together they selected the F-16 Fighting Falcon in 1975 as part of the "European Participating Air Forces" (EPAF) agreement. Norway ordered 74 F-16A/B Block 1, 5, 10 and 15 some of them being the OCU package through the "Peace Falcon" program. However, Norway ended up upgrading their Block 1 and Block 5 planes. The first F-16s were delivered to Bodø airport in 1980 and first flew with the 332 Squadron. In the 1990s, Norway's F-16 aircraft received an extensive Mid-Life Update (MLU) and many planes converted to the Block 20 to keep them operational. The upgrades included a new cockpit with modern displays and computers, a better radar (APG-66(V)2) for better target tracking, Link 16 for better communication with NATO aircraft, and the ability to use modern weapons such as AIM-120 AMRAAM and JDAM. After the phase-out, Norway's F-16 was sold on. 32 aircraft were sold to Romania in 2023. 12 aircraft were sold to Draken International, a private company in the USA.

== Future operators ==
=== Peru ===
Peru has expressed its interest on acquiring 26 F-16/79 to the Reagan administration in July 1982. The US DoD sent a team to Peru in August 1982 to present the deal to the Peruvian officials. When the Peruvian Air Force chief learned that the US wasn't offering the sale of F-16s with F100 engines, the meeting was cancelled.

The Commander of Peruvian Air Force stated in October 2024 that the country was looking to buy a fleet of 24 multi-role aircraft that could be operated for the next 30–40 years. Contender for the contract are F-16V, KAI KF-21 Boramae, Saab JAS 39E/F Gripen, and Dassault Rafale.

On 15 September 2025, the US government has approved the sale of 12 F-16V Block 70s and related equipment to Peru for an estimated cost of $3.42 billion.

In April 2026, the Peruvian government formalized the acquisition of 24 F-16 Block 70 fighter jets for a total of $3.5 billion to renew its fleet. The operation includes direct agreements with American suppliers to ensure logistical support, pilot training, and the supply of parts. Through this strategic debt, authorities intend to replace obsolete equipment and strengthen national sovereignty.

== Potential operators ==
In December 2011, the Department of National Defense (DND) and Department of Foreign Affairs (DFA) were tasked to formally request at least a squadron of 12 ex-USAF F-16C/D fighter jets, most probably Block 25 or 30, which would be refurbished to either Block 50 or 52 standards. This was discussed during the US-Philippines "2+2" Meeting on 30 April 2012. The Philippine government would pay for refurbishing, maintenance and pilot training which would run for two years.

However, by 2012 the maintenance costs for the used fighters were found to be too high so attention turned to new jet trainers that could be converted into jet fighters. The requirements were listed as "supersonic ability, multifunction displays and On Board Oxygen Generation System." A DND spokesman has said that aircraft from France, the United Kingdom, Italy, and South Korea were considered.

It was reported that the DND would be acquiring multi-role fighters by 2018. In response to the Philippine desire for multi-role fighters, the United States offered variants of the General Dynamics F-16 Fighting Falcon. The US State Department approved the sale of 10 F-16C Block 70/72 and 2 F-16D Block 70/72 jets to the Philippines on 24 June 2021. The interest for F-16s renewed and re-emphasized as both the Philippine and U.S. governments sees the need of fast-tracking the multi-role fighter acquisition project during the Joint 2+2 Ministerial Dialogue. On 1 April 2025, US State Department approved another sale of F-16s as the previous approval has since expired. The approval outlined the potential sale of 16 F-16C Block 70/72 and 4 F-16D Block 70/72 jets to the Philippines for US$5.58 billion (320.2 billion PHP). This approval is in response to the Philippine Secretary of National Defense Gilberto Teodoro's outlined plan to acquire 40 multi-role fighters for Horizon 3 modernization program.

On 21 April 2025, multiple news channels reported that Vietnam is finalizing an agreement to purchase at least 24 F-16s, possibly the F-16V variant.

== Cancelled orders and failed bids ==
=== Australia ===
The F-16A and F-16C were among the designs considered by the Royal Australian Air Force to replace its Dassault Mirage III fighters in the late 1970s and early 1980s. After the initial evaluation processes were concluded, the RAAF was left with a choice between the F-16C and F/A-18 Hornet, both of which met its technical requirements. While the F-16C was cheaper than the F/A-18A, the RAAF decided that the Hornet was more technologically mature, easier to maintain during operational deployments, and likely to have a much lower attrition rate. Accordingly, the Australian Government chose to order 75 F/A-18s in October 1981.

=== Bangladesh ===
Bangladesh attempted to acquire up to 16 F-16s from the United States in the late 1990s in an attempt to modernize the Bangladesh Air Force, with this incident being revealed following political controversy surrounding the purchase of MiG-29SE fighters from Russia in 1999, after questions were raised as to the nature and cost of the purchase by the Official Opposition. Then Prime Minister of Bangladesh Sheikh Hasina stated in Parliament that the original intent was to acquire F-16s from America, but that had been denied as the Americans stated that the F-16s "had no use in the subcontinent". She also stated that they would gladly take the F-16s they had originally asked for if the Americans "repented" and sold the airframes. Bangladesh acquired eight MiG-29s in total, and later acquired more cost effective modernized Chinese J-7s.

=== Brazil ===
On 12 June 2024, the specialized website Janes, reported an ongoing negotiation between the Brazilian Air Force (FAB) and USAF for 24 F-16s from the US stocks, possibly Block 40/42. The units would be complementary to the newest Saab JAS 39 Gripen, and to replace the oldest AMX and Northrop F-5 to be retired from 2025. As stated by a Brazilian official to the website, the negotiation could be finalized until the end of 2024.

According to other sources familiar with the negotiation, the procurement could involve surplus USAF Boeing KC-135 tankers. On 14 June, the FAB confirmed the interest on the acquisition of F-16 fighters.

Brazil was evaluating the F-16BR with the intent to manufacture it in a joint-venture with Lockheed Martin. The Dassault Rafale, Boeing F/A-18 Super Hornet, and the Saab Gripen NG were eventually shortlisted, but not the F-16BR. In the end, the JAS-39 Gripen E was chosen.

=== Croatia ===
In July 2017, the Croatian Ministry of Defence announced it had restarted the Croatian Air Force MiG-21 replacement procurement program, and issued a request for proposals for up to 12 aircraft to five countries: Greece, Israel and the United States for the General Dynamics F-16 Fighting Falcon, Sweden for the Saab JAS 39 Gripen, and South Korea for the KAI T-50 Golden Eagle.

In October 2017, the Ministry announced it had received four letters of intent for up to 18 aircraft from the United States, Israel and Greece, offering various F-16 variants, as well as Sweden offering an unknown Saab JAS 39 Gripen variant. South Korea did not place a bid in the tender.

In November 2017, Croatian media announced the offers from Sweden for the Saab JAS 39 Gripen and Israel for a mixed fleet of A/B and C/D General Dynamics F-16 Fighting Falcon variants had been downselected from the four offers. According to reports, the US bid was dismissed for being too expensive, and the F-16 Block 30 offered by Greece was dismissed for being too outdated. Further reports insinuate the Israeli offer was leading for being most price-competitive, as well as opening up additional opportunities for defence cooperation.

In March 2018, Croatia accepted the Israeli offer for 12 F-16C/D Block 30 "Barak" aircraft in a US$500 million deal.

In December 2018, confusion about the deal arose after reports in Israeli media claimed that United States Secretary of Defense Jim Mattis was blocking the deal over Israeli equipment on the aircraft, that would give them an unfair advantage over the US bid for ex-United States Air Force F-16s. According to the reports, United States Secretary of State Mike Pompeo spoke with Israeli Prime Minister Benjamin Netanyahu saying "I'm in favor, but Defense Secretary Mattis is against; it's him who is blocking it". Croatian Defence Minister Damir Krstičević denied the reports, stating that "The US government has given permission to the State of Israel to offer the Israeli F-16 to Croatia, and we have documented to that effect". It was revealed later that month that Mattis rejected Netanyahu's request to sell the F-16s, unless Israeli upgrades were removed and the aircraft were sold in their original configuration, to which the Croatian government responded by stating they would cancel the deal if this were the case.

On 2 January 2019, the Croatian Ministry of Defence issued a deadline on the sale for 11 January, by which the sale as originally agreed upon must be confirmed, or it would be canceled. On 11 January, the sale was officially canceled by the Israeli Ministry of Defence, which reportedly issued an apology to their Croatian counterparts.

In May 2021, Croatia selected the French Dassault Rafale to replace its MiG-21s over competing bids, including F-16 offers from Israel and the United States.

=== Colombia ===
The United States has offered to sell about 15 F-16s to Colombia to modernize its fighter force, currently consisting of 22 aging IAI Kfirs. The offer includes training and maintenance services and overhaul of the 15 jets, offered until now by the US government to Colombia, pending Colombian government approval, and to stop the constant aggressions made by the government of Venezuela.

In April 2018, Colombia was offered surplus Israeli Air Force F-16A/B "Netz" and F-16C/D "Barak" aircraft by Elbit Systems and Israel Aerospace Industries. The aircraft were offered in response to a Colombian Air Force requirement for 12 to 18 fighters, to replace its current fleet of IAI Kfirs. The offer reportedly includes a service life extension program that would upgrade the aircraft to a standard reportedly similar to Block 50. However, On 3 April 2025, Colombia announced it had selected the Gripen E/F to replace its Kfir fleet in a deal expected to include 16 to 24 units.

=== Iran ===
Iran placed an order for 160 aircraft for the former Imperial Iranian Air Force (IIAF) in 1976, with an option for a further 140. Due to the Iranian Revolution in 1979, the order was cancelled and no deliveries were made. 55 of these aircraft were later delivered to the Israeli Air Force.

=== India ===
For the ongoing Indian MRCA competition for the Indian Air Force (IAF), Lockheed Martin was offering the customized F-16IN Super Viper. The F-16IN is based closely on the F-16E/F Block 60 and features conformal fuel tanks, an AN/APG-80 AESA radar, a GE F110-132A engine with FADEC controls, an electronic warfare suite, an infrared search and track (IRST) sensor, an updated all-color glass cockpit, and a helmet-mounted cueing system. Lockheed Martin and the United States government intensively lobbied for India's US$10 billion contract for 126 fighter jets. Ashton Carter, chief of The Pentagon's acquisition department, even raised the possibility of United States offering the F-35 Lightning II to India as a follow-on to the F-16IN. The IAF extensively evaluated the F-16 which included field trials in hot weather conditions and in high-altitude mountain ranges. In April 2011, the IAF rejected the F-16IN's bid in favor of either the Eurofighter Typhoon or Dassault Rafale. In January 2012, the Dassault Rafale finally emerged as the winner of this US$10.5 billion deal for 126 fighter jets.

In September 2015, Lockheed offered to produce F-16s in India as a part of the Make in India programme by Prime Minister Narendra Modi and talks began in February 2016 for a potential deal. F-16IN lost in the competition with JAS 39 Gripen E, when Lockheed retired from production in India, and decided to move production line from Fort Worth (Texas) to Greenville (South Carolina). As of July 2017, Lockheed Martin has agreed to sign a letter of intent with the Indian defence firm Tata Advanced Systems Limited to manufacture the jets in India if the Indian government accepts their tender for India's request for a purchase of single engine aircraft to replace its aging Mig fighters. The new production line can be utilised to supply jets to India as well as for exporting them overseas. This tender was however cancelled as a result of the 1997 Asian financial crisis.

=== New Zealand ===
In December 1998, the National Party, under the leadership of Prime Minister Jenny Shipley, had given approval for the Royal New Zealand Air Force to acquire 28 F-16A/B Block 15s following their embargoed sale to Pakistan under a 10-year lease-buy arrangement as an interim replacement for its fleet of ageing A-4 Skyhawks. The agreed price was US$105 million. In a controversial move the acquisition was cancelled by the new incoming Labour government under Helen Clark in March 2000 citing a benign security environment in which "an air combat force is not a priority".

== Summaries of F-16 deliveries ==
=== Foreign sales programs by codename ===
While USAF and EPAF customers account for the majority of F-16 sales, the F-16 has also been sold to many other customers under an agreement known as a Foreign Military Sales (FMS) program.

Since the DoD assigns two-word codenames to programs such as these, FMS programs are assigned two-word codenames beginning with the word PEACE, indicating oversight by USAF Headquarters. The second word in these FMS sales is often chosen to reflect some facet of the customer, such as MARBLE for Israel or ONYX for Turkey. DoD codenames appear in all capital letters.

The codename is assigned beginning with the first FMS sale, and Roman numerals are appended to distinguish follow-on buys, the original FMS buy denoted with the Roman numeral 'I'.

Note that the sale of the F-16E and F-16F Block 60 models to the UAE was not assigned a codename, because it was not sold under an FMS agreement.

Program codename	Customer	Deliveries	Aircraft acquired	Notes
Peace A'sama A'safiya	Oman	2005–2006	(12) 8 F-16C-50 (Adv.), 4 F-16D-50 (Adv.)	“A'sama A'safiya” means “Clear Skies”.
Peace A'sama A'safiya II	Oman	2014	(12) 10 F-16C-50 (Adv.), 2 F-16D-50 (Adv.)	“A'sama A'safiya” means “Clear Skies”.
Peace Atlantis I	Portugal	1994	(20) 17 F-16A-15OCU, 3 F-16B-15OCU	
Peace Atlantis II	Portugal	1999	(25) 21 F-16A-15, 4 F-16B-15	USAF EDAs, 5 F-16As broken down for spares; received MLU upgrade
Peace Bima Sena I	Indonesia	1989–1990	(12) 8 F-16A-15OCU, 4 F-16B-15OCU	Up to 28 additional F-16s were offered. Additional order for 9 aircraft (Pakistani orders) was cancelled.
Peace Bima Sena II	Indonesia	2014–2018	(30) 24 F-16C/D. 4 F-16C/D & 2 F-16A/B (instructional airframe, kept in the US).	Block 25 upgraded to Block 32+ (Block 52ID).
Peace Bridge I	South Korea	1986–1992	(40) 30 F-16C-32, 10 F-16D-32	
Peace Bridge II	South Korea	1994–2000	(120) 80 F-16C-52, 40 F-16D-52	Licensed production, Korea Fighter Program (KFP). KF-16
Peace Bridge III	South Korea	2003–2004	(20) 14 F-16C-52+, 6 F-16D-52+	Licensed production, Korea Fighter Program (KFP). KF-16
Peace Carvin I	Singapore	1988	(8) 4 F-16A-15OCU, 4 F-16B-15OCU	
Peace Carvin II	Singapore	1998	(18) 8 F-16C-52, 10 F-16D-52	
Peace Carvin III	Singapore	2000–2002	(12) 10 F-16C-52, 2 F-16D-52	
Peace Carvin IV	Singapore	2003–2004	(20) 20 F-16D-52+	
Peace Caesar	Italy	2003–2004	(34) 26 F-16A-15ADF, 4 F-16B-15ADF, 4 F-16A/B-5/10	10-year lease program of surplus USAF aircraft.
Peace Crown I	Bahrain	1990	(12) 8 F-16C-40, 4 F-16D-40	
Peace Crown II	Bahrain	2000	(10) 10 F-16C-40	
Peace Delta	Venezuela	1982–1984	(24) 18 F-16A-15, 6 F-16B-15	
Peace Falcon I	Jordan	1997–1998	(16) 12 F-16A-15ADF, 4 F-16B-15ADF	USAF EDAs
Peace Falcon II	Jordan	2003	(17) 12 [7+9?] F-16A-15ADF, 5 [1?] F-16B-15ADF	USAF EDAs
Peace Fenghuang	Taiwan	1997–2001	(150) 120 F-16A-20, 30 F-16B-20	Fenghuang stands for "phoenix" in Mandarin, Chinese.
Peace Gate I	Pakistan	1983	(6) 2 F-16A-15, 4 F-16B-15	
Peace Gate II	Pakistan	1983–1987	(34) 26 F-16A-15, 8 F-16B-15	
Peace Gate III	Pakistan	Embargoed	(11) 6 F-16A-15OCU, 5 F-16B-15OCU	
Peace Gate IV	Pakistan	Embargoed	(60) 48 F-16A-15OCU, 12 F-16B-15OCU	
Peace Drive I	Pakistan	2006–2010	(18) 12 F-16C-52, 6 F-16D-52	
Peace Marble I	Israel	1979–1981	(75) 18 F-16A-5, 8 F-16B-5, 40 F-16A-10, 9 F-16A-15	Originally destined for Iran as "Peace Zebra". Cancelled due to revolution.
Peace Marble II	Israel	1986–1988	(75) 51 F-16C-30, 24 F-16D-30	
Peace Marble III	Israel	1991–1993	(60) 30 F-16C-40, 30 F-16D-40	
Peace Marble IV	Israel	1994	(50) 3 F-16A-1, 2 F-16B-1, 1 F-16A-5, 7 F-16B-5, 32 F-16A-10, 5 F-16B-10	
Peace Marble V	Israel	2004–2009	(102) 102 F-16D-52	
Peace Naresuan I	Thailand	1988	(12) 8 F-16A-15OCU, 4 F-16B-15OCU	
Peace Naresuan II	Thailand	1990–1991	(6) 6 F-16A-15OCU	
Peace Naresuan III	Thailand	1995–1996	(18) 12 F-16A-15OCU, 6 F-16B-15OCU	
Peace Naresuan IV	Thailand	2002–2003	(18) 15 F-16A-15ADF, 1 F-16B-15ADF, 2 F-16A-10OCU	
Peace Onyx I	Turkey	1987–1995	(160) 34 F-16C-30, 9 F-16D-30, 102 F-16C-40, 15 F-16D-40	All were license built by TUSAŞ under Öncel programme. Out of 270 aircraft, 10 were designated as "Perfect," and 48 were identified with "Zero Defect".
Peace Onyx II	Turkey	1996–1997	(40) 34 F-16C-50, 6 F-16D-50	All were license built by TUSAŞ under Öncel programme. Out of 270 aircraft, 10 were designated as "Perfect," and 48 were identified with "Zero Defect".
Peace Onyx III	Turkey	1998–1999	(40) 26 F-16C-50, 14 F-16D-50	All were license built by TUSAŞ under Öncel programme. Out of 270 aircraft, 10 were designated as "Perfect," and 48 were identified with "Zero Defect".
Peace Onyx IV	Turkey	2010–2011	(30) 16 F-16C-50+, 14 F-16D-50+	All were license built by TUSAŞ under Öncel programme. Out of 270 aircraft, 10 were designated as "Perfect," and 48 were identified with "Zero Defect".
Peace Sky	Poland	2006–2009	(48) 36 F-16C-52, 12 F-16D-52	
Peace Vector I	Egypt	1982–1985	(42) 34 F-16A-15, 8 F-16B-15	
Peace Vector II	Egypt	1986–1988	(40) 34 F-16C-32, 6 F-16D-32	
Peace Vector III	Egypt	1991–1995	(47) 35 F-16C-40, 12 F-16D-40	
Peace Vector IV	Egypt	1994–1995	(46) 34 F-16C-40, 12 F-16D-40	Built by Turkish TUSAŞ
Peace Vector V	Egypt	1999–2000	(21) 21 F-16C-40	
Peace Vector VI	Egypt	2001–2002	(24) 12 F-16C-40, 12 F-16D-40	
Peace Xenia I	Greece	1989–1990	(40) 34 F-16C-30, 6 F-16D-30	
Peace Xenia II	Greece	1997–1998	(40) 32 F-16C-50, 8 F-16D-50	
Peace Xenia III	Greece	2002–2004	(60) 40 F-16C-52, 20 F-16D-52	
Peace Xenia IV	Greece	2009–2010	(30) 20 F-16C-52, 10 F-16D-52	
