= Women in World War II =

Aspect of women's history

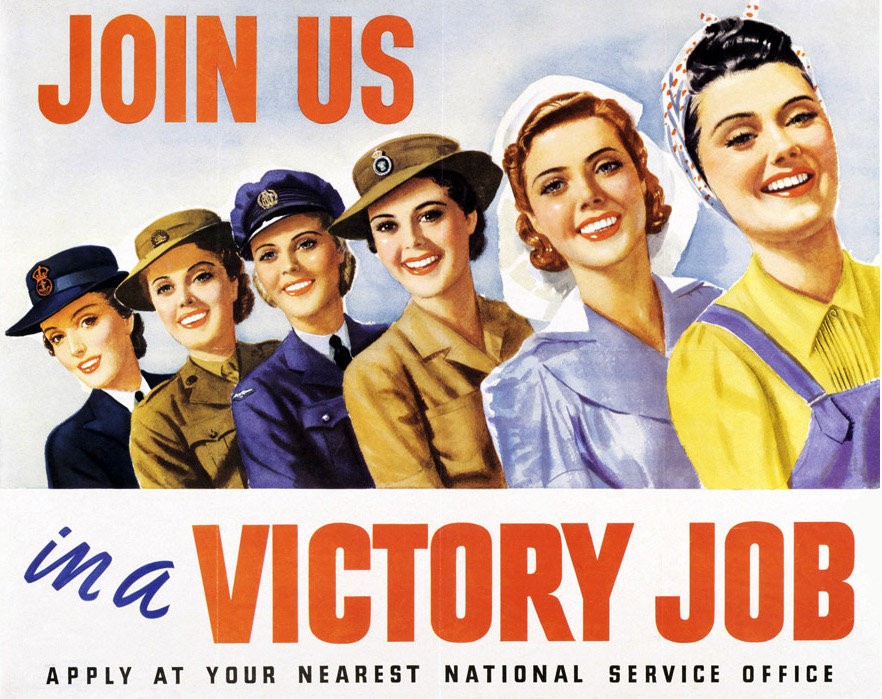
In many nations women were told to join female branches of the armed forces or participate in industrial or farm work.

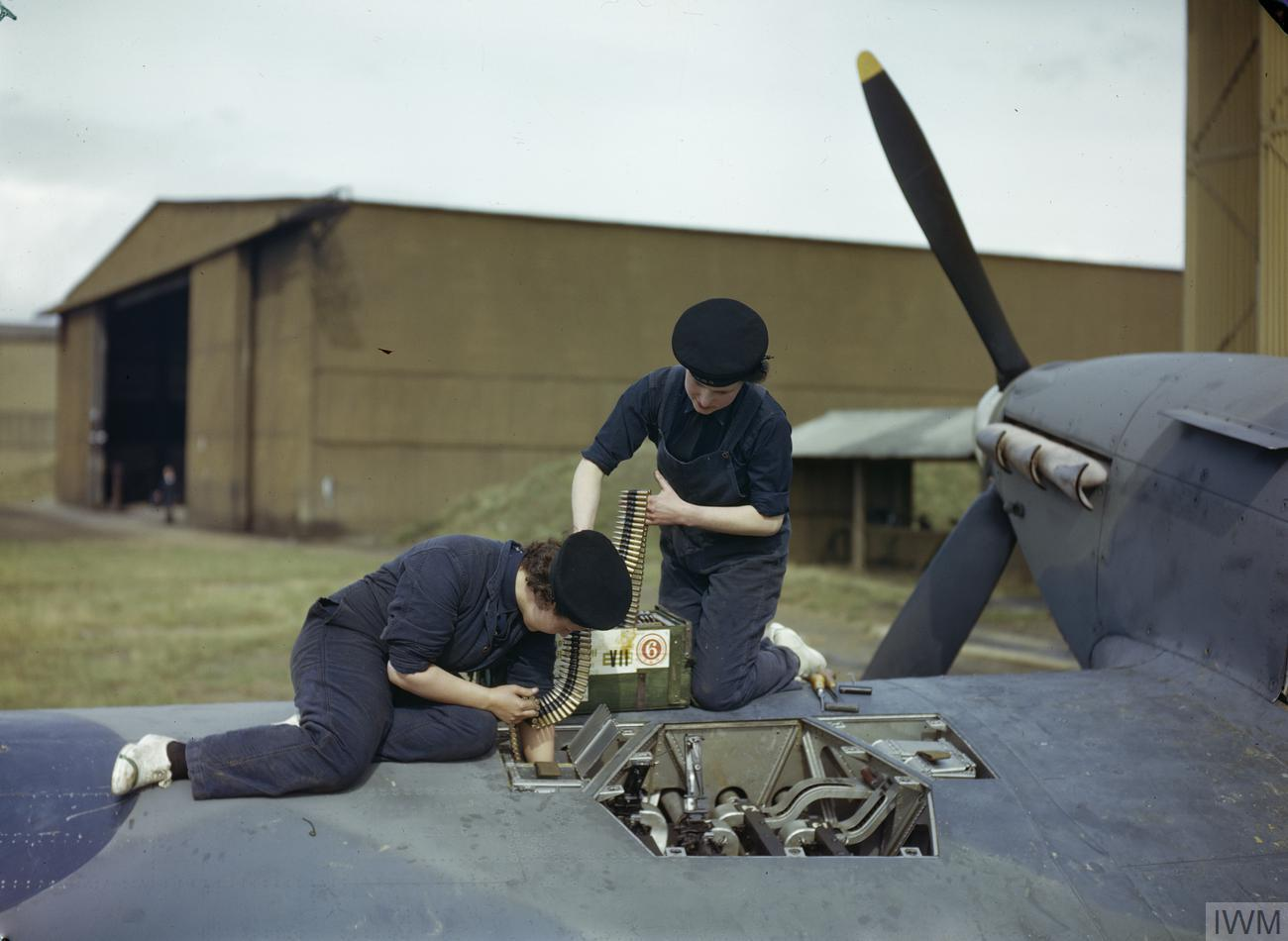
Wren Air Mechanics loading ammunition into an aircraft, Yeovilton, England. The United Kingdom employed women in a wide variety of non-combatant support roles.

Women took on many different roles during World War II, including as combatants and workers on the home front. The war involved global conflict on an unprecedented scale; the absolute urgency of mobilizing the entire population made the expansion of the role of women inevitable, although the particular roles varied from country. Millions of women of various ages were injured or died as a result of the war.

Several hundred thousand women served in combat roles, especially in anti-aircraft units. The Soviet Union integrated women directly into their army units; approximately one million served in the Red Army, including about at least 50,000 on the frontlines; Bob Moore noted that "the Soviet Union was the only major power to use women in front-line roles," The United States, by comparison, elected not to use women in combat because public opinion would not tolerate it. Instead, as in other nations, about 350,000 women served as uniformed auxiliaries in non-combat roles in the U.S. armed forces. These roles included administration, nurses, truck drivers, mechanics, electricians, and auxiliary pilots. Some were killed in combat or captured as prisoners of war. Over 1600 female nurses received various decorations for courage under fire. Approximately 350,000 American women joined the military during World War II.

Women also took part in the resistances of France, Italy, Poland, and Yugoslavia, as well as in the British SOE and American OSS which aided these.

Some women were forced into sexual slavery: the Imperial Japanese Army forced hundreds of thousands in Asia to become sex slaves known as comfort women, before and throughout World War II.

Women soldiers and auxiliaries on all sides of the conflict, when enlisted in the military, were eventually taken prisoners of war, just like their male counterpart. They were often discriminated, particularly by the Axis and the USSR, which were more likely to violate the Geneva Convention.Among the earliest women POWs of the war were women who served in the Polish Army (Germans avoided using women in the military except as auxiliaries—Wehrmachthelferin— until later years); including Janina Lewandowska, Polish aviator and army officer captured by the Soviets during their invasion of Poland and subsequently murdered in the Katyn massacre.

== Allies ==
=== Australia ===
Australian women played a larger role in World War II than they had done in World War I. Many women wanted to play an active role, and hundreds of voluntary women's auxiliary and paramilitary organisations had been formed by 1940. A shortage of male recruits forced the military to establish female branches in 1941 and 1942.

=== Canada ===
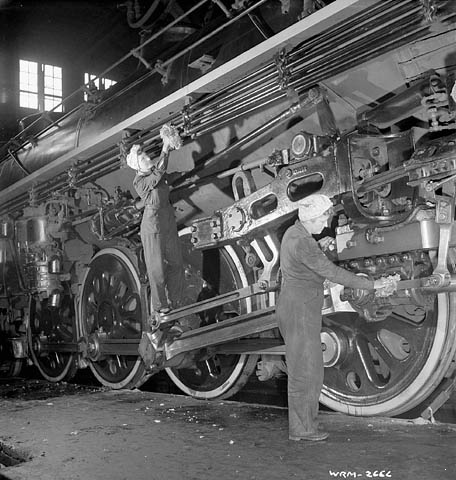
Women replaced men in many of the roundhouse jobs during World War II. Photo taken January 1943.

When war began to look unavoidable in the late 1930s, Canadian women felt obligated to help the fight. In October 1938, the Women's Volunteer Service was established in Victoria, British Columbia. Soon, all the provinces and territories followed suit and similar volunteer groups emerged. "Husbands, brothers, fathers, boyfriends were all joining up, doing something to help win the war. Surely women could help as well!" In addition to the Red Cross, several volunteer corps had designed themselves after auxiliary groups from Britain. These corps had uniforms, marching drills and a few had rifle training. It became clear, that a unified governing system would be beneficial to the corps. The volunteers in British Columbia donated two dollars each to pay the expenses so a representative could talk to politicians in Ottawa. Although all of the politicians appeared sympathetic to the cause, it remained "premature" in terms of national necessity.

In June 1941, the Canadian Women's Army Corps was established. The women who enlisted would take over

- Drivers of light mechanical transport vehicles
- Cooks in hospitals and messes
- Clerks, typists, and stenographers at camps and training centres
- Telephone operators and messengers
- Canteen helpers

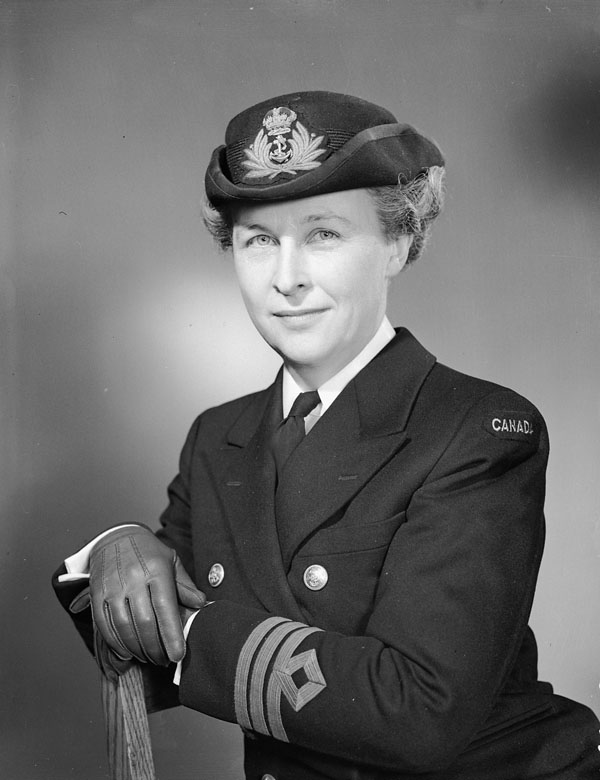
Commander Adelaide Sinclair, Director of the Women's Royal Canadian Naval Service

On 2 July 1942, women were given permission to enlist in what would be known as the Canadian Women's Auxiliary Air Force. Lastly the Royal Canadian Navy created the Women's Royal Canadian Naval Service (WRENS). The WRENS were the only corps that were officially a part of their sanctioning body as a women's division. This led to bureaucratic issues that would be solved most easily by absorbing the civilian corps governed by military organizations, into women's divisions as soldiers. According to the RCAF the following are the requirements of an enlisted woman:

1. Must be at least 17 years of age, and younger than 41 years of age
2. Must be of medical category A4B (equivalent of A1)
3. Must be equal to or over 5 feet (152 cm), and fall within the appropriate weight for her height, not being too far above or below the standard
4. Must have a minimum education of entrance into high school
5. Be able to pass the appropriate trades test
6. Be of good character with no record of conviction for an indictable offence

Women would not be considered for enlistment if they were married and had children dependent on them. Training centres were required for all of the new recruits. They could not be sent to the existing centres as it was necessary that they be separated from male recruits. The Canadian Women's Army Corps set up centres in Vermilion, Alberta and Kitchener, Ontario. Ottawa and Toronto were the locations of the training centres for the Canadian Women's Auxiliary Air Force. The WRENS were outfitted in Galt, Ontario. Each service had to come up with the best possible appeal to the women joining, for they all wanted them. In reality, the women went where their fathers, brothers and boyfriends were. Women had numerous reasons for wanting to join the effort; whether they had a father, husband, or brother in the forces, or simply felt it a duty to help. One woman blatantly exclaimed that she could not wait to turn eighteen to enlist, because she had fantasies of assassinating Hitler. Many women aged 16 or 17 lied about their age in order to enlist. The United States would allow only women who were at least twenty-one to join. For their young female citizens, Canada was the logical option. Recruitment for the different branches of the Canadian Forces was set up in places like Boston and New York. Modifications were made to girls with US citizenship, having their records marked, "Oath of allegiance not taken by virtue of being a citizen of The United States of America".

Women had to undergo to medical examinations and meet fitness requirements as well as training in certain trades, depending on the aspect of the armed forces of which they wanted to be a part. Enlisted women were issued entire uniforms minus the undergarments, for which they would receive a quarterly allowance.

To be an enlisted woman during the creation stages was not easy. Besides the fact that everyone was learning as they went, they did not receive the support they needed from the male recruits. To begin with, women were initially paid two-thirds of what a man at the same level would make. As the war progressed the military leaders began to see the substantial impact the women could make. This was taken into account and the women received a raise to four-fifths of the wages of a man. A female doctor however, would receive equal financial compensation to her male counterpart. The negative reaction of men towards the female recruits was addressed in propaganda films. Proudly She Marches and Wings on Her Shoulder were made to show the acceptance of female recruits, while showing the men that although they were taking jobs traditionally intended for men, they would be able to retain their femininity.

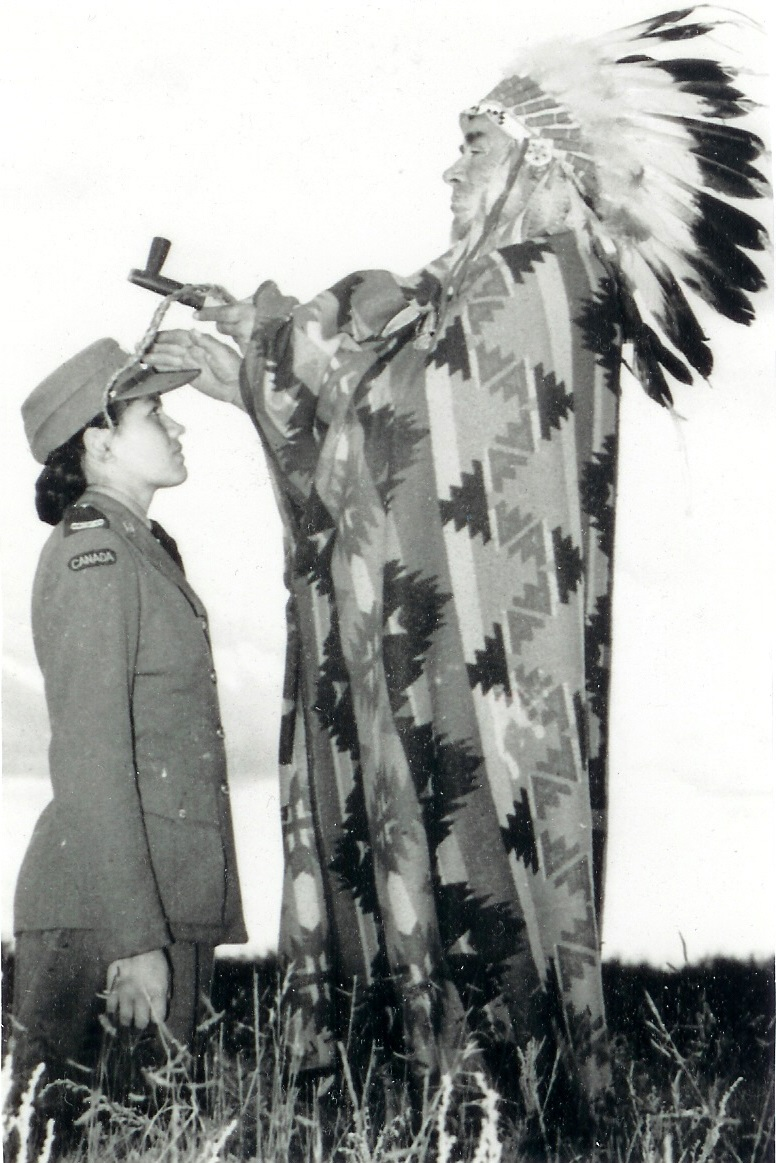
Army publicity photograph of Mary Greyeyes-Reid with Harry Ball, a member of the Piapot First Nation dressed in the garb of a Plains Chief.

Other problems faced early on for these women were those of a more racial nature. An officer of the CWAC had to write to her superiors regarding whether or not a girl of "Indian nationality" would be objected to for enlistment. Because of Canada's large population of immigrants, German women also enlisted, creating great animosity between recruits. The biggest difficulty was the French-Canadian population. In a document published on 25 November 1941, it was declared that enlisted women should "unofficially" speak English. However, seeing the large number of capable women that this left out, a School of English was stabled for recruits in mid-1942. In 1942, Mary Greyeyes-Reid became the first First Nations woman to join the Canadian Forces. She was featured in photographs to represent native people in the forces, yet at the same time was not welcome in the barracks due to discrimination.

Once in training, some women felt that they had made a mistake. Several women cracked under the pressure and were hospitalized. Other women felt the need to escape, and ran away. The easiest and fastest way out of the service was pregnancy. Women who found out that they were expecting were given a special, quickly executed, discharge.

The women who successfully graduated from training had to find ways to entertain themselves to keep morale up. Softball, badminton, tennis, and hockey were among popular pastimes for recruits.

Religion was of a personal matter to the recruits. A minister of sorts was usually on site for services. For Jewish women, it was custom that they were able to return to their barracks by sundown on Sabbath and holidays; a rabbi would be made available if possible.

At the beginning of the war, 600,000 women in Canada held permanent jobs in the private sector. By the peak in 1943, 1.2 million women had jobs. Women quickly gained a good reputation for their mechanical dexterity and fine precision due to their smaller stature.

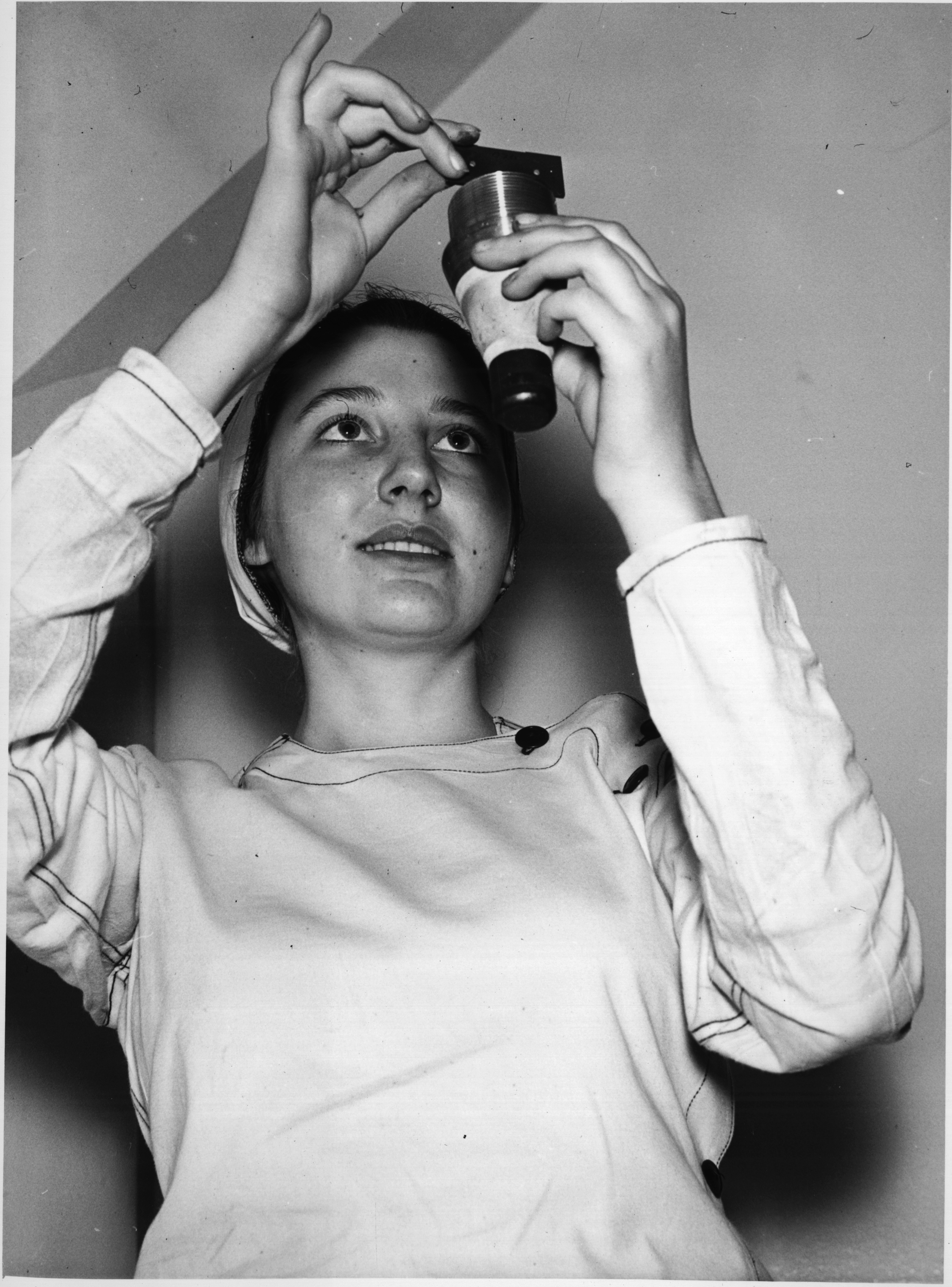
A woman measuring a piece of munitions at the GECO munitions factory

Female munitions workers were sometimes nicknamed: "Bomb Girl", "Fusilier", "Munitionette", "Munitions Gal". Canadian munitions factories that hired women include the General Engineering Company (Canada) Limited (GECO) and Defence Industries Limited (DIL).

Women in the GECO (or "Scarboro") munitions plant filled fuses, primers, tracers and tubes In addition to buildings dedicated to munitions manufacturing, GECO also included a bank, offices, a guardhouse, a kitchen, proofing yard, changing houses, medical department, laundry, Recreation Club and more.

Women also had to keep their homes together while the men were away. "An Alberta mother of nine boys, all away at either war or factory jobs – drove the tractor, plowed the fields, put up hay, and hauled grain to the elevators, along with tending her garden, raising chickens, pigs, and turkeys, and canned hundreds of jars of fruits and vegetables".

In addition to physical jobs, women were also asked to cut back and ration. Silk and nylon were used for the war efforts, creating a shortage of stockings. Many women painted lines down the back of their legs to create the illusion of wearing the fashionable stockings of the time.

=== Italy ===
After 1943, Italian women joined the anti-fascist resistance, and also served in the fascist army of Mussolini's rump state that formed in 1943. Some 35,000 women (and 170,000 men) joined in the Resistance. The women served as auxiliaries in their own ranks. Most did cooking and laundry duty. Some were guides, messengers, and couriers near the front lines. Others were attached to small attack groups of five or six fighters engaged in sabotage. Some all-female units, engaged in civilian and political action. The Germans aggressively tried to suppress them, sending 5000 to prison, deporting 3000 to Germany. About 650 died in combat or by execution. On a much larger scale, non-military auxiliaries of the Catholic Centro Italiano Femminile (CIF) and the leftist Unione Donne Italiane (UDI) were new organizations that gave women political legitimacy after the war.

=== Poland ===
==== 1939 ====
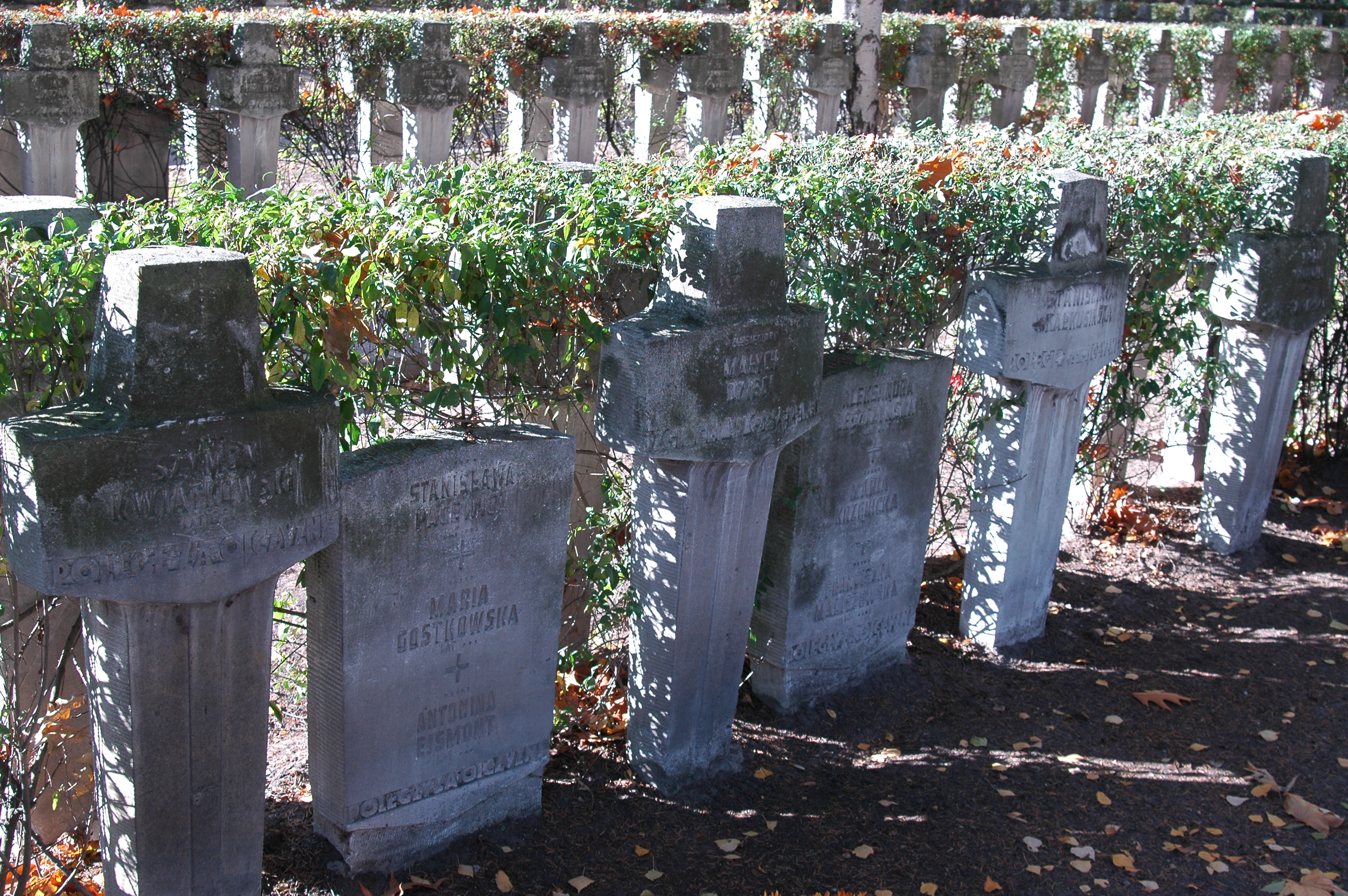
A grave of three Polish female soldiers who were killed during the Invasion of Poland, 1939, among their colleagues interred at Warsaw's Powązki Cemetery

The Polish military maintained a number of Women's Military Battalions, trained by the Przysposobienie Wojskowe Kobiet (Female Military Training) and commanded by Maria Wittek. During the Invasion of Poland they saw combat, playing auxiliary roles in defensive action. Janina Lewandowska was a pilot. Marianna Cel was a member of Henryk Dobrzański's guerilla unit from 1939 to 1940.

==== Underground ====
Krystyna Skarbek worked for the Polish underground in Hungary and later joined SOE. Writer Zofia Kossak-Szczucka helped Jews during the Holocaust, was arrested and imprisoned in the Auschwitz concentration camp. Elżbieta Zawacka was a paratrooper, courier and fighter. Grażyna Lipińska organised an intelligence network in German-occupied Belarus 1942–1944.

In occupied Poland, women played an important role in the resistance movement. Their most important role was as couriers carrying messages between cells of the resistance movement and distributing news broadsheets and operating clandestine printing presses. During partisan attacks on Nazi forces and installations they served as scouts. About 40,000 of Polish women were imprisoned in Ravensbrück concentration camp. Zofia Posmysz survived two camps and described her story, inspiring the 1963 film Passenger. Wanda Jakubowska was imprisoned in Auschwitz and after the war directed a classic film The Last Stage.

Jewish women fought in the Warsaw Ghetto Uprising and several smaller fights. The Stroop Report contains a picture of HeHalutz female fighters captured with weapons.

During the Warsaw Rising of 1944, female members of the Home Army were couriers and medics, but many carried weapons and took part in the fighting. Among the more notable women of the Home Army was Wanda Gertz who created and commanded DYSK (Women's sabotage unit). For her bravery in these activities and later in the Warsaw Uprising she was awarded Poland's highest awards – Virtuti Militari and Polonia Restituta. Many nurses were murdered on 2 September 1944. Anna Świrszczyńska was a nurse and expected to be executed. She described later the Rising in her poems. One of the articles of the capitulation was that the German Army recognized them as full members of the armed forces and needed to set up separate prisoner-of-war camps to hold over 2000 female prisoners-of-war.

Małgorzata Fornalska was one of important Communist activists, arrested and killed by Germans. Helena Wolińska-Brus was influential in Communist underground Gwardia Ludowa, later Armia Ludowa.

Many female teachers organized underground education.

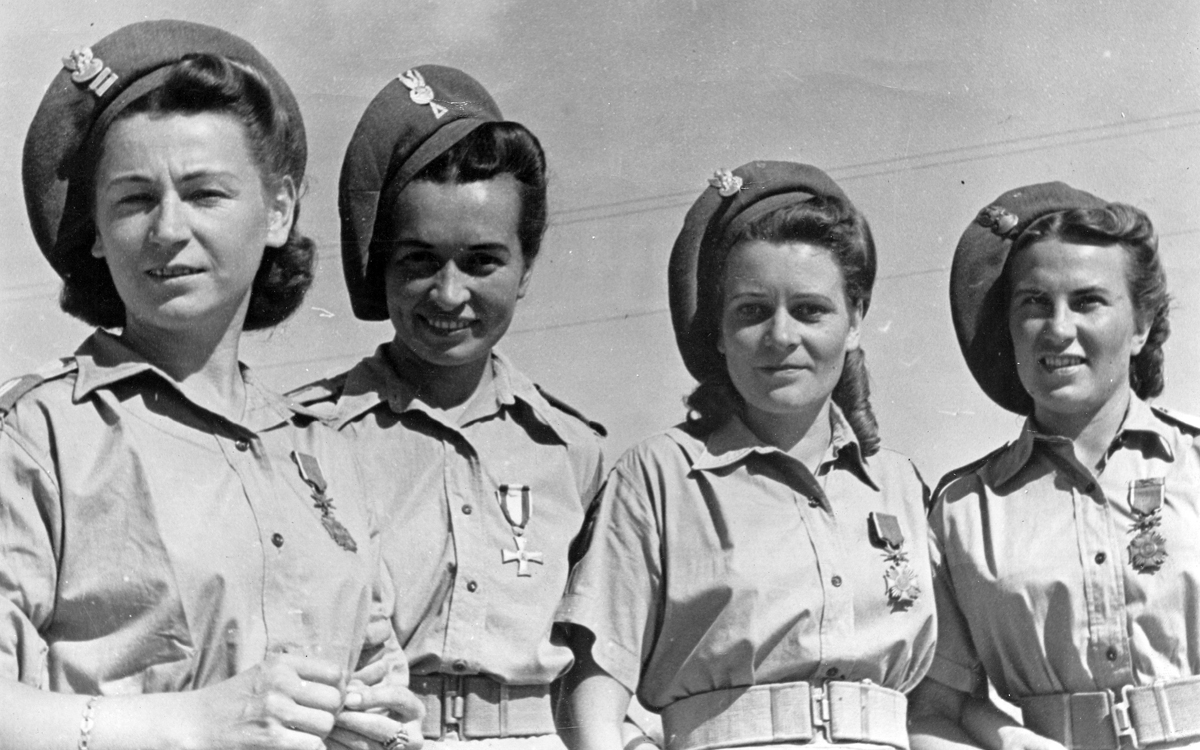
Four members of Poland's Women's Auxiliary Service

Many women worked for Żegota: Zofia Kossak-Szczucka, Irena Sendler, Antonina Żabińska.

==== Armed forces ====
A number of all-female units in the Polish forces in exile were also established. These included the Anders Army, the Women's Auxiliary Service which was deployed in Italy and served across the Polish Army, Navy, and Air Force. The Soviet First Polish Army had the Emilia Plater Independent Women's Battalion, whose members took part in fighting as part of sentry duties.

==== Extermination ====
- The Holocaust

Stefania Wilczyńska cooperated with Janusz Korczak working in a Jewish orphanage in Warsaw Ghetto, they were murdered in Treblinka extermination camp.

- Romani genocide
- Slavs

Thousands of women were killed during Pacification actions in German-occupied Poland. Tens of thousands were killed by Ukrainian nationalists in Volhynia and Eastern Galicia. Tens of thousands of Polish women were shot in August 1944 at Warsaw during Ochota massacre and Wola massacre.

==== Concentration camps and slave work ====
Zofia Kossak-Szczucka, Seweryna Szmaglewska, Krystyna Żywulska were imprisoned in Auschwitz and later described their experiences in novels. Many women were Zivilarbeiters or camp or prison inmates who had to work for Germans. There existed a camp for girls in Dzierżązna, Łódź Voivodeship, a subcamp of the Polen-Jugendverwahrlager der Sicherheitspolizei in Litzmannstadt.

Babies born by the prisoners were starved in Nazi birthing centres for foreign workers.

==== Sexual contacts ====
German historian Maren Röger describes three types of sexual contact: intimacy, rape and prostitution.

=== Soviet Union ===
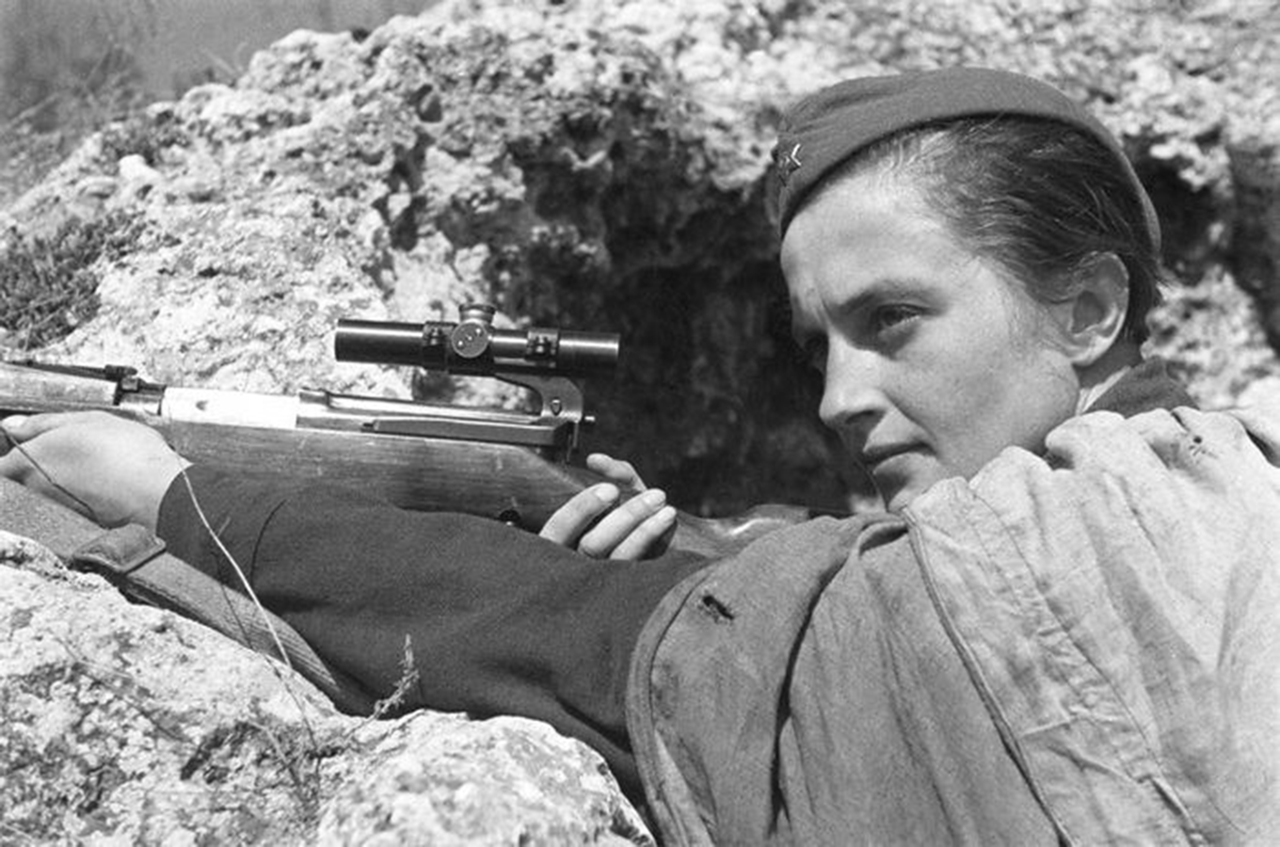
Lyudmila Pavlichenko in a trench, 1942

The Soviet Union mobilized women at an early stage of the war, integrating them into the main army units, and not using the "auxiliary" status. More than 800,000 women served in the Soviet Armed Forces during the war, which is roughly 3 percent of total military personnel, mostly as medics. About 300,000 served in anti-aircraft units and performed all functions in the batteries – including firing the guns. A small number were combat flyers in the Air Force, forming three bomber wings and joining into other wings. Women also saw combat in infantry and armored units, and female snipers became famous after commander Lyudmila Pavlichenko made a record killing 309 Germans (mostly officers and enemy snipers).

=== United Kingdom ===
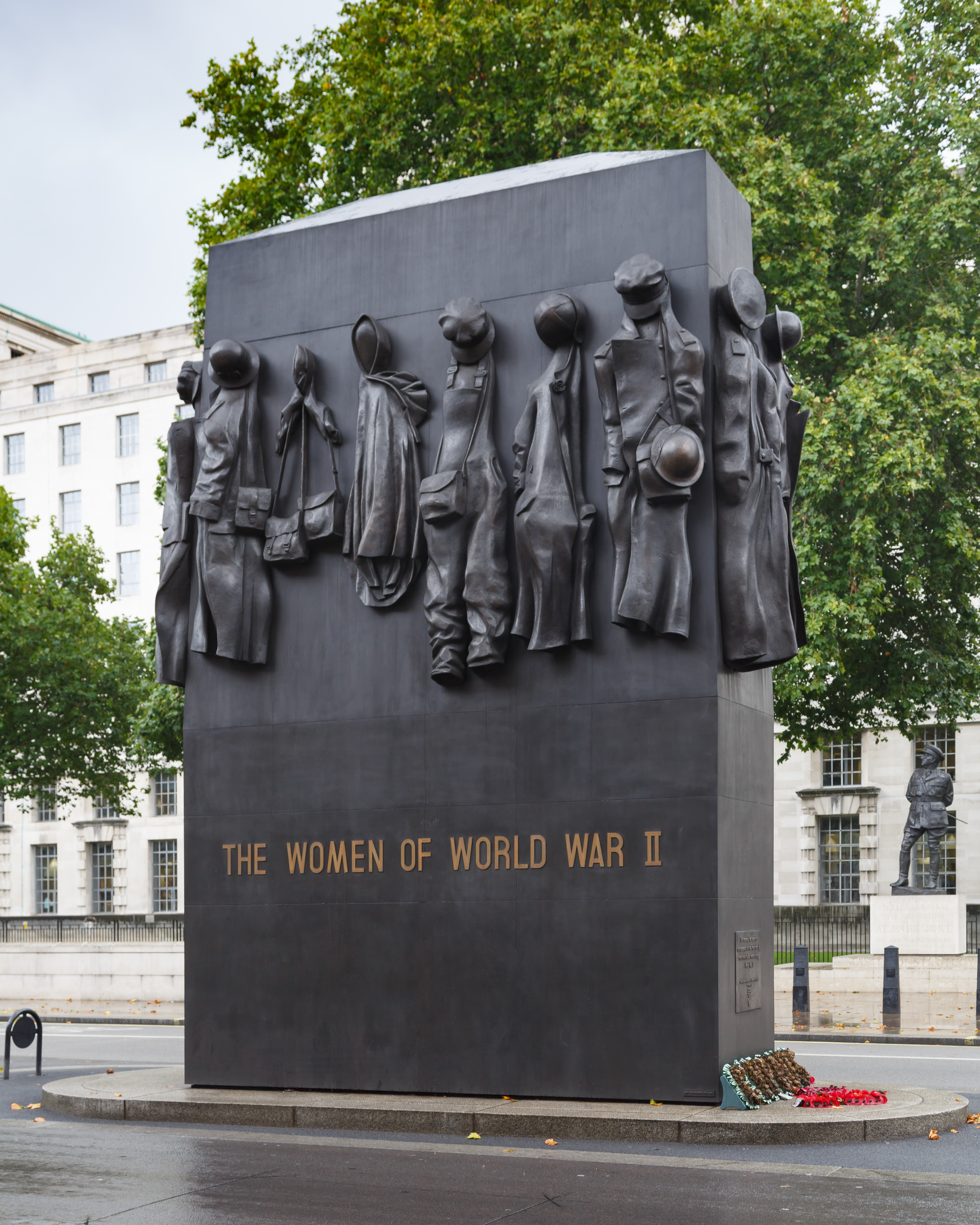
The Monument to the Women of World War II, London

==== Workplace ====
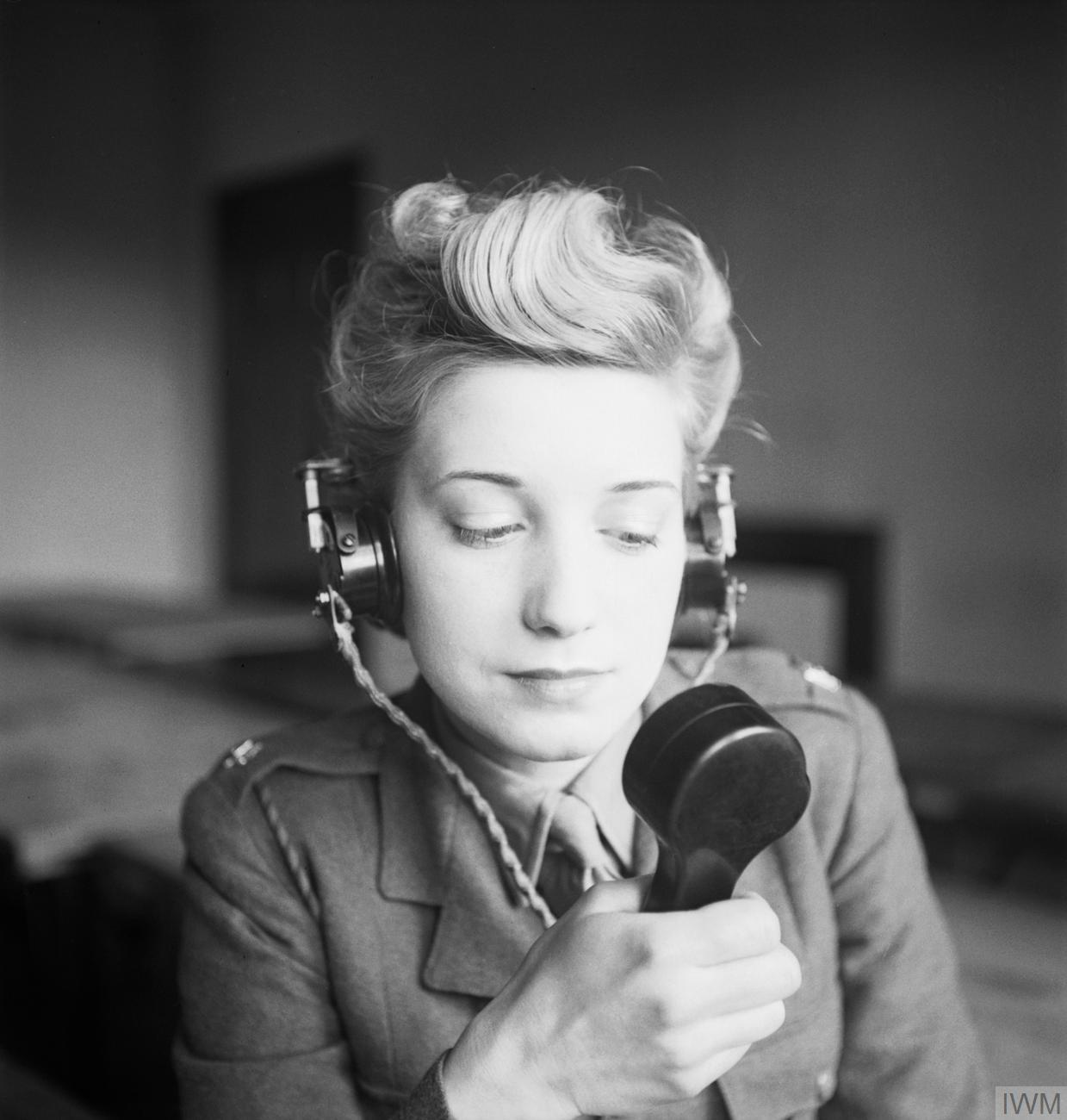
Pte Elizabeth Gourlay transmitting a radio message

When Britain went to war, as before in World War I, previously forbidden job opportunities opened up for women. Women were called into the factories to create the weapons that were used on the battlefield. Women took on the responsibility of managing the home and became the heroines of the home front. According to historian Susan Carruthers, this industrial employment of women significantly raised women's self-esteem as it allowed them to carry out their full potential and do their part in the war. During the war, women's normative roles of "house wife" transformed into a patriotic duty. As Carruthers put it, the housewife has become a heroine in the defeat of Hitler.

The roles of women shifting from domestic to male-dominated and dangerous jobs in the workforce made for important changes in workplace structure and society. During the Second World War, society had specific ideals for the jobs in which both women and men participated. When women began to enter into the male-dominated workforce and munitions industries previously dominated by men, women's segregation began to diminish. Increasing numbers of women were forced into industry jobs between 1940 and 1943. As surveyed by the Ministry of Labour, the percentage of women in industrial jobs went from 19.75 per cent to 27 per cent from 1938 to 1945. It was very difficult for women to spend their days in factories, and then come home to their domestic chores and care-giving, and as a result, many women were unable to hold their jobs in the workplace.

Britain underwent a labour shortage where an estimated 1.5 million people were needed for the armed forces, and an additional 775,000 for munitions and other services in 1942. It was during this "labour famine" that propaganda aimed to induce people to join the labour force and do their bit in the war. Women were the target audience in the various forms of propaganda as they were paid substantially less than the men. It was of no concern whether women were filling the same jobs that men previously held. Even if women were replacing jobs with the same skill level as a man, they were still paid significantly less due to their gender. In the engineering industry alone, the number of skilled and semi-skilled female workers increased by 75-85 percent from 1940 to 1942. According to Gazeley, even though women were paid less than men, it is clear that women engaging in war work and taking on jobs preserved by men reduced industrial segregation.

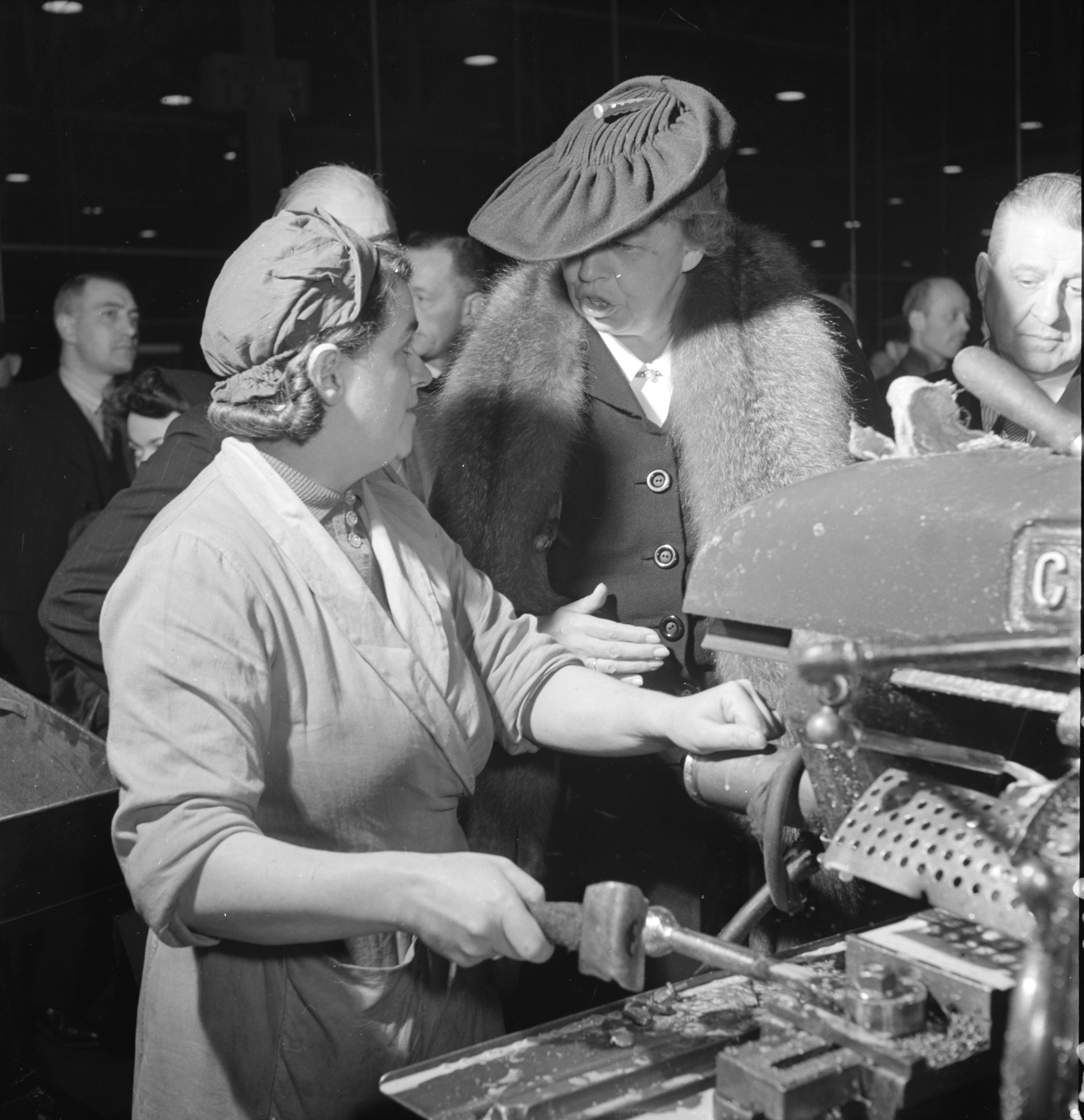
A female machinist talking with Eleanor Roosevelt during her goodwill tour of Great Britain in 1942

In Britain, women were essential to the war effort. The contribution by civilian men and women to the British war effort was acknowledged with the use of the words "home front" to describe the battles that were being fought on a domestic level with rationing, recycling, and war work, such as in munitions factories and farms. Men were thus released into the military. Women were also recruited to work on the canals, transporting coal and munitions by barge across the UK via the inland waterways. These became known as the "Idle Women", initially an insult derived from the initials IW, standing for Inland Waterways, which they wore on their badges, but the term was soon adopted by the women themselves. Many women served with the Women's Auxiliary Fire Service, the Women's Auxiliary Police Corps and in the Air Raid Precautions (later Civil Defence) services. Others did voluntary welfare work with Women's Voluntary Services and the Salvation Army.

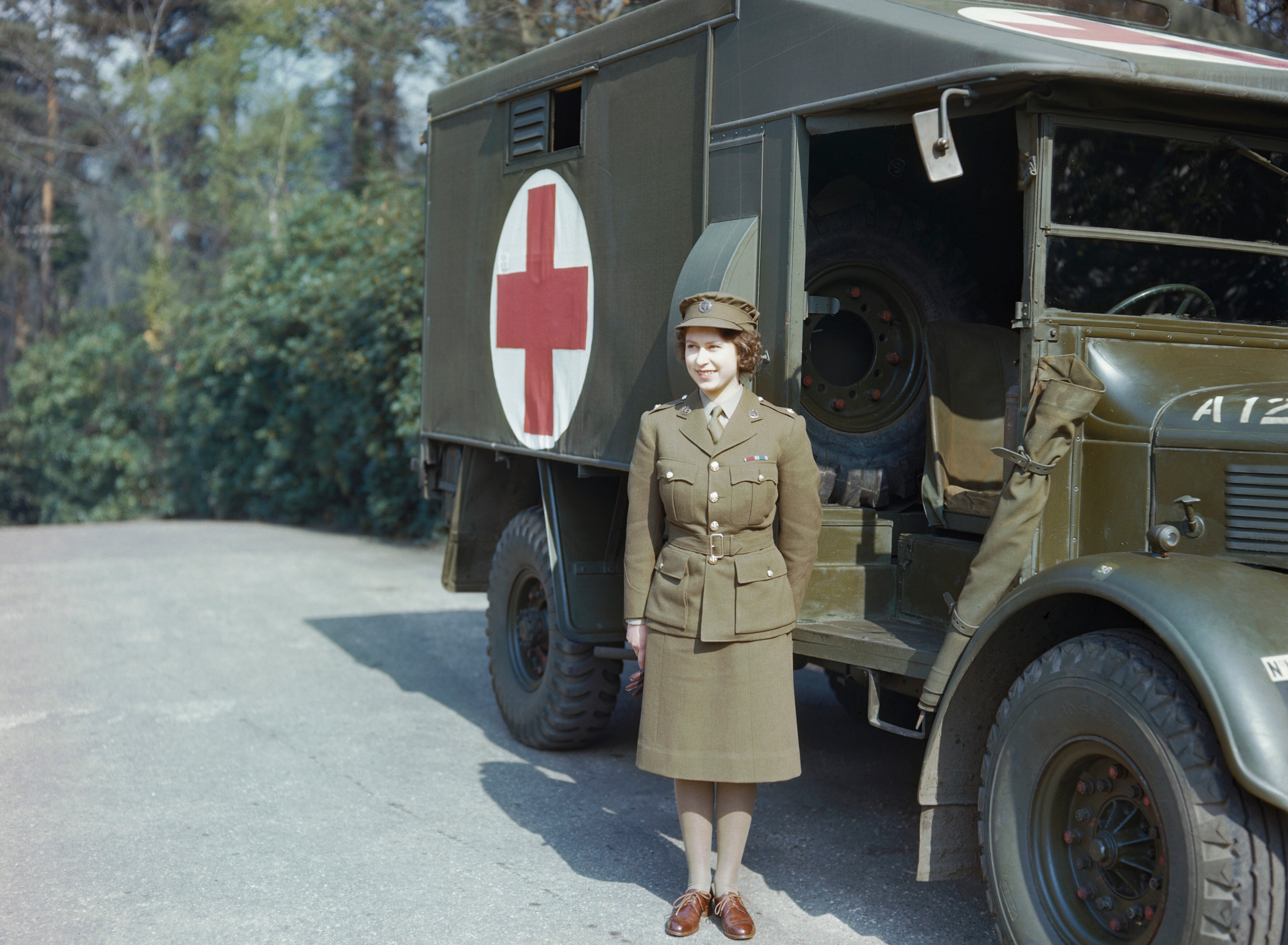
Princess Elizabeth (later Queen Elizabeth II) in the Auxiliary Territorial Service, April 1945

Women were "drafted" in the sense that they were conscripted into war work by the Ministry of Labour, including non-combat jobs in the military, such as the Women's Royal Naval Service (WRNS or "Wrens"), the Women's Auxiliary Air Force (WAAF or "Waffs") and the Auxiliary Territorial Service (ATS). Auxiliary services such as the Air Transport Auxiliary also recruited women. In the early stages of the war such services relied exclusively on volunteers, however by 1941 conscription was extended to women for the first time in British history and around 600,000 women were recruited into these three organisations. In these organizations women performed a wide range of jobs in support of the Army, Royal Air Force (RAF) and Royal Navy both overseas and at home. These jobs ranged from traditionally feminine roles like cook, clerk and telephonist to more traditionally masculine duties like mechanic, armourer, searchlight, and anti-aircraft instrument operator. British women were not drafted into combat units, but could volunteer for combat duty in anti-aircraft units, which shot down German planes and V-1 missiles. Civilian women joined the Special Operations Executive (SOE), which used them in high-danger roles as secret agents and underground radio operators in Nazi occupied Europe.

==== Propaganda ====
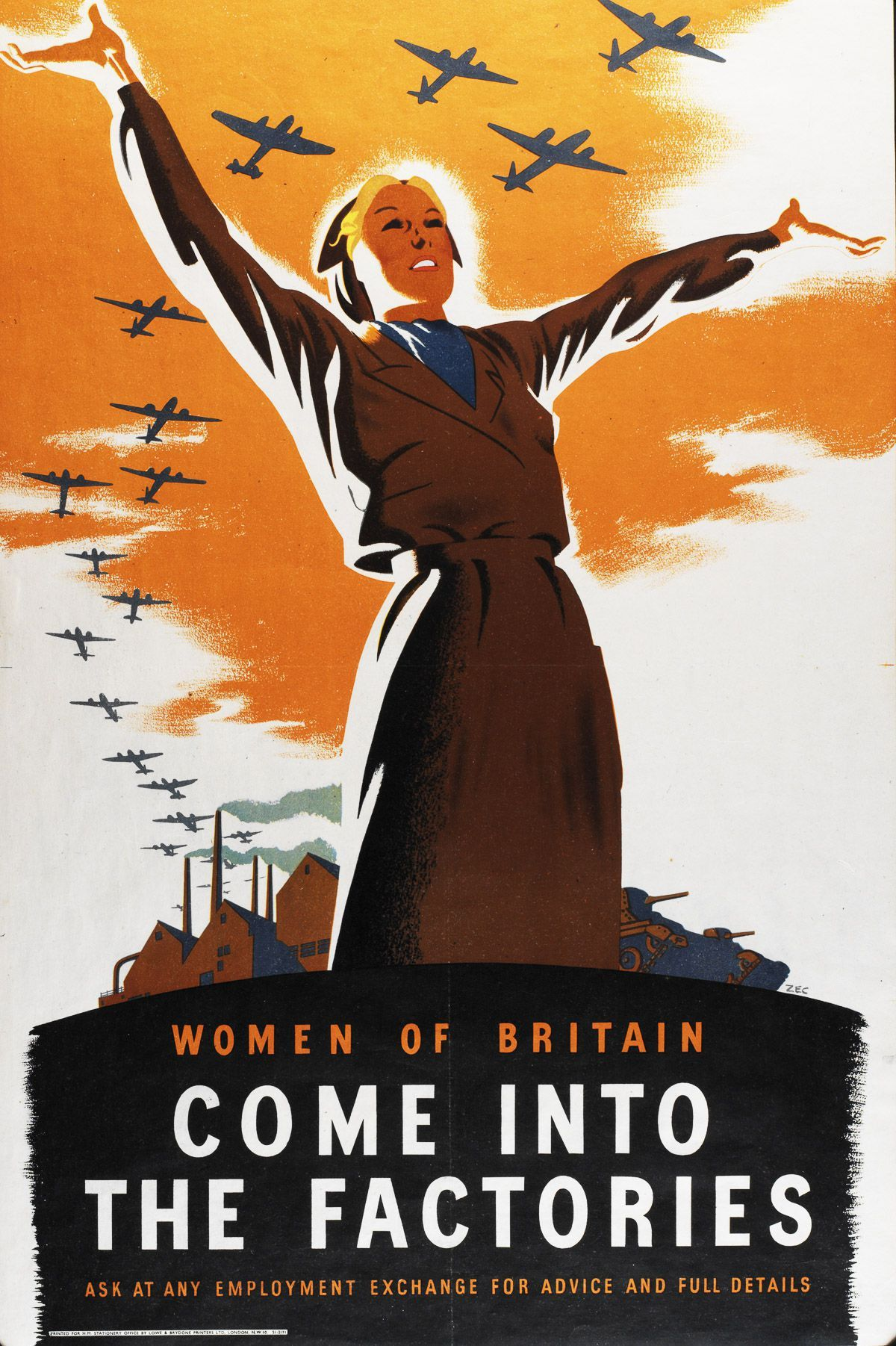
Propaganda poster by Philip Zec encouraging British women to work in factories

British Women's Propaganda was issued during the war in attempts to communicate to the house-wife that while keeping the domestic role, she must also take on a political role of patriotic duty. Propaganda was meant to eliminate all conflicts of personal and political roles and create a heroine out of the women. The implication with propaganda is that it asked women to redefine their personal and domestic ideals of womanhood and motivate them go against the roles that have been instilled in them. The government struggled to encourage women to respond to posters and other forms of propaganda. One attempt to recruit women into the labour force was in one short film Her Father's Daughter. In this propaganda film a wealthy factory owner's daughter begs to do her part in the war, but her father carries the stereotypical belief that women are meant to be caretakers and are incapable of such heavy work. When one foreman presents one of the most valuable and efficient workers in the factory as the daughter, the father's prejudices are eliminated. The encouraging message of this short film is "There's Not Much Women Can't Do".

==== Military roles ====
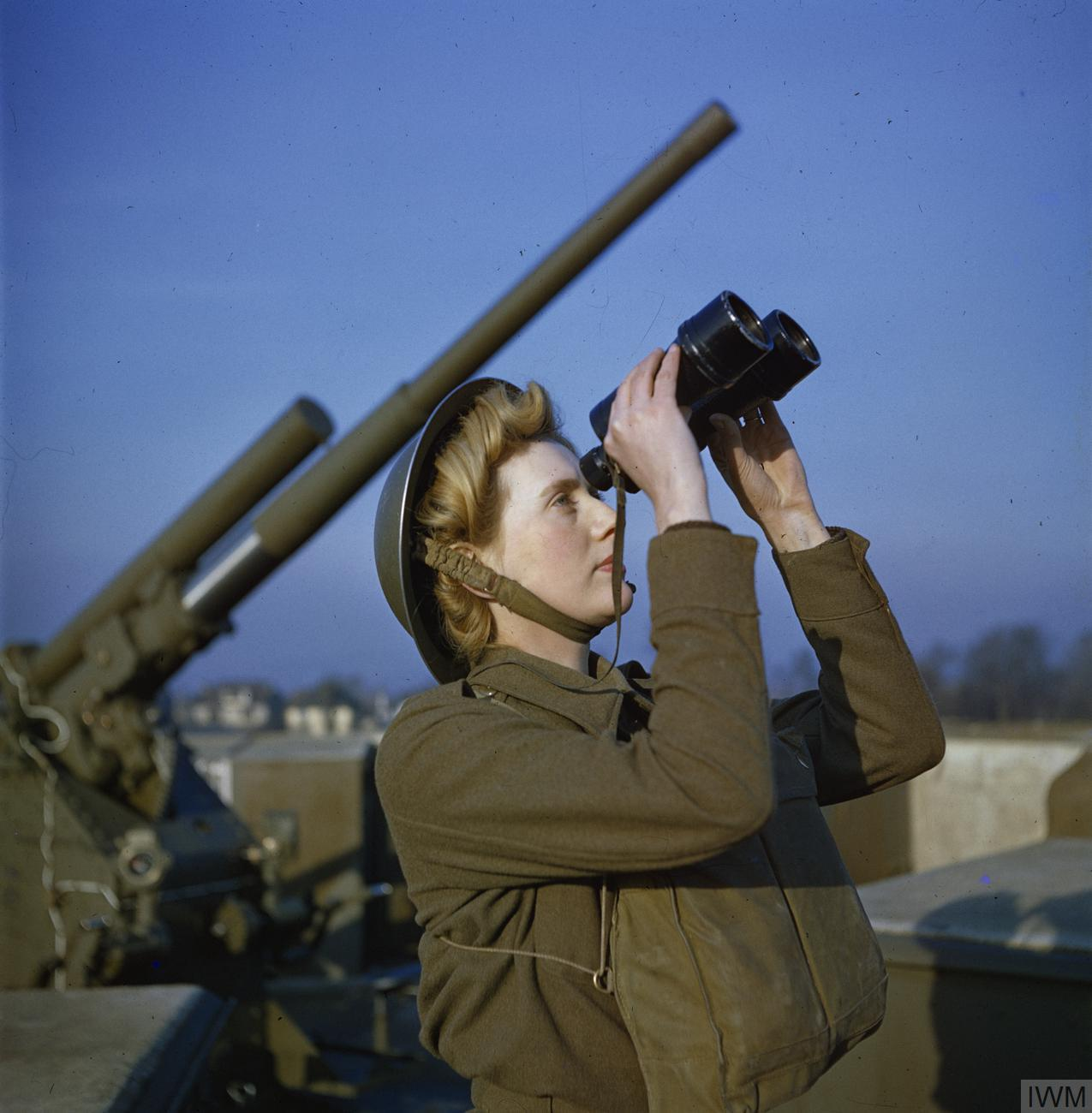
An ATS spotter at a 3.7-inch AA gun site, December 1942

The most common role of women in active service was that of a searchlight operator. All of the members of the 93rd Searchlight Regiment were women. Despite being limited in their roles, there was a great amount of respect between the men and women in the mixed batteries. One report states "Many men were amazed that women could make adequate gunners despite their excitable temperament, lack of technical instincts, their lack of interest in aeroplanes and their physical weaknesses". While women still faced discrimination from some of the highly stereotypical older soldiers and officers who did not like women "playing with their guns", women were given rifle practice and taught to use anti-aircraft guns while serving in their batteries. They were told that this was in case the Germans invaded. If that were to ever happen, they would be evacuated immediately.

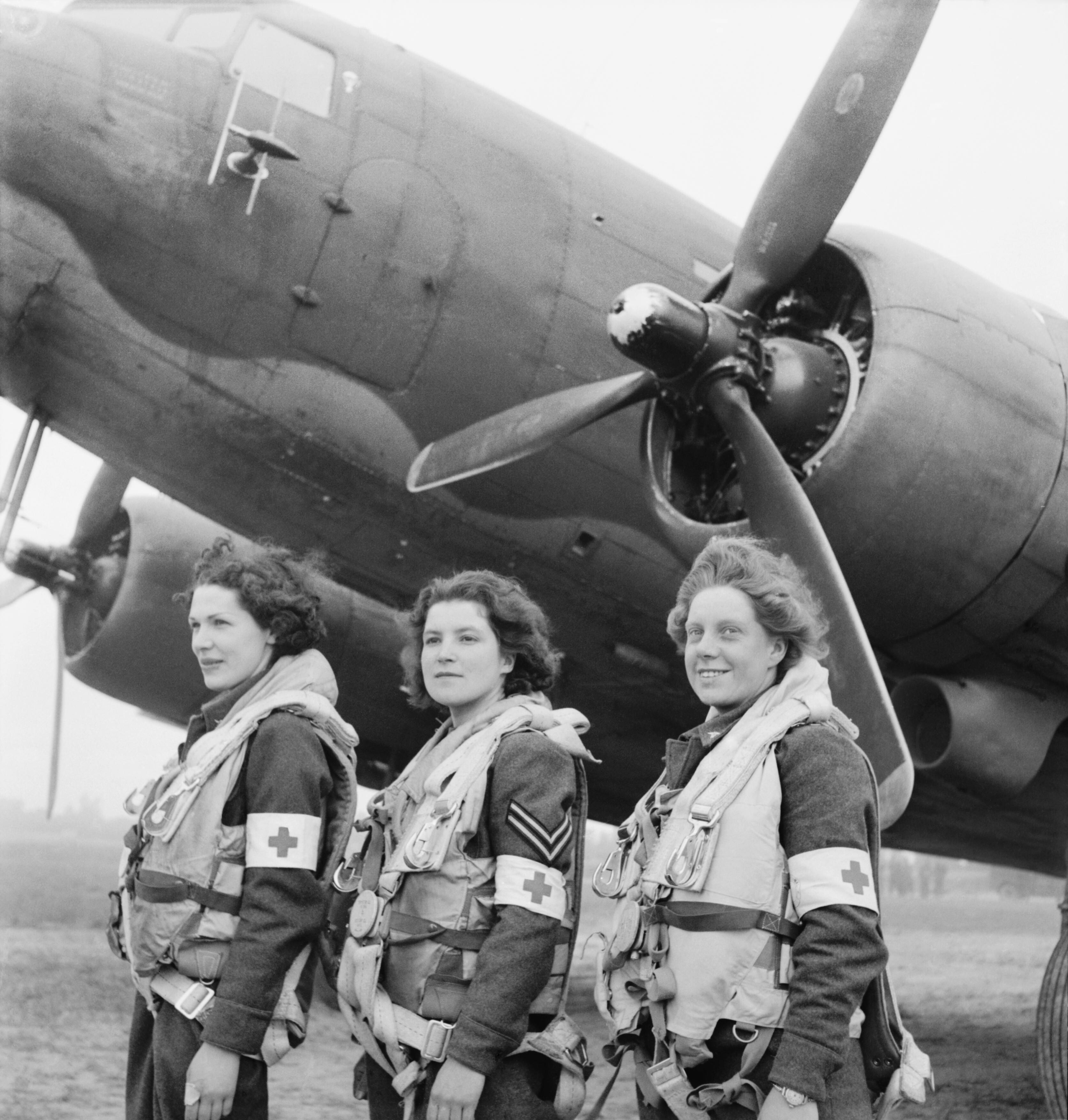
The first WAAF nursing orderlies selected to fly on air-ambulance duties to France, 1944

Three quarters of women who entered the wartime forces were volunteers, compared to men who made up less than a third. Single or married women were eligible to volunteer in WAAF, ATS or WRNS and were required to serve throughout Britain as well as overseas if needed, however the age limits set by the services varied from each other. Generally women between 17 and 43 could volunteer and those under 18 required parental consent. After applying, applicants had to fulfill other requirements, including an interview and medical examination; if they were deemed fit to serve then they were enrolled for the duration of the war. WRNS was the only service that offered an immobile branch which allowed women to live in their homes and work in the local naval establishment. WRNS was the smallest of the three organizations and as a result was very selective with their candidates. Of the three organizations, WAAF was the most preferred choice; the second being WRNS. ATS was the largest of the three organizations and was least favoured among women because it accepted those who were unable to get into the other forces. ATS had also developed a reputation of promiscuity and poor living conditions, many women also found the khaki uniform unappealing and as a result favoured WRNS and WAAF over ATS. Over 640,000 British women served in various auxiliary services of the British armed forces.

==== Limitations ====
Whilst women were limited in some of their roles, they were expected to perform to the same standard as a male soldier performing the same role, and although they could not participate in frontline combat, they still manned anti-aircraft guns and defences which actively engaged hostile aircraft above Britain. Women went through the same military training, lived in the same conditions and did almost the same jobs as men, with the exception of not being able to participate in front-line combat. This important distinction meant that women did not tend to be nominated for medals of valour or bravery, because they were only awarded for "active operations against enemy in the field", which women could not take part in.

Women were also distinct because of the titles by which they were addressed in the army, although these tended to be no different from their male counterparts. They wore the same rank insignia as their male counterparts. Many members of the ATS were respected by the units they were attached to despite their different insignia. The only major difference between an ATS member and a male member of the Regular Army was discipline: a woman was not allowed to be court marshalled unless she herself chose to be. The women in the service were also under the authority of the female officers of the ATS, instead of the male officers under whom they served directly. This meant any disciplinary action was entirely in the hands of the ATS, removing male influence from the process.

==== Volunteers ====
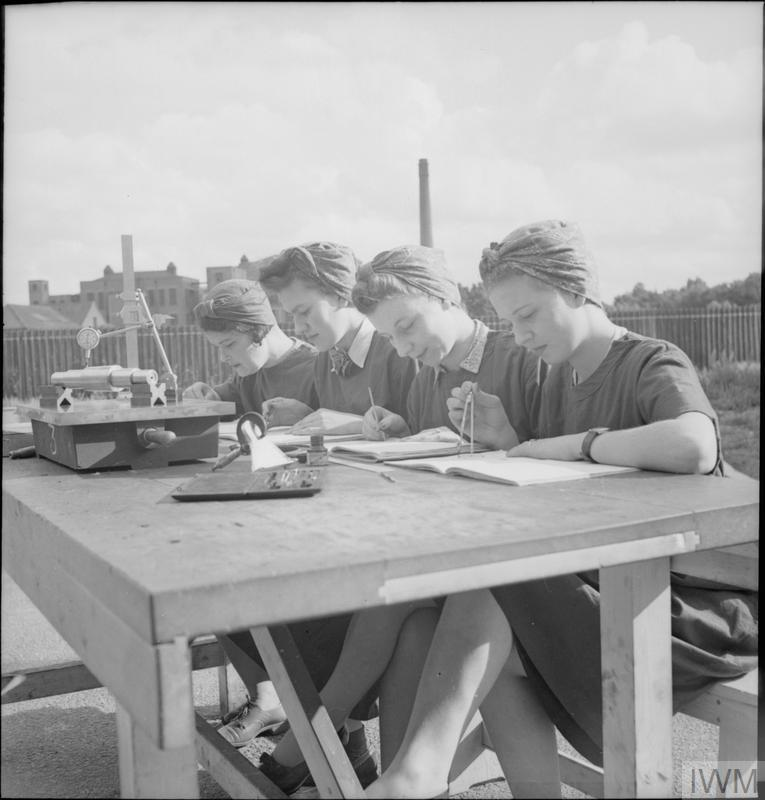
Women munitions trainees, 1941

In March 1941, in a speech at Newcastle, Ernest Bevin appealed for 100,000 women to volunteer for war service in British factories. Women were eager to volunteer. Many of the servicewomen came from restricted backgrounds; therefore they found the army liberating. Other reasons women volunteered included escaping unhappy homes or marriages, or to have a more stimulating job. The overwhelming reason for joining the army, though, was patriotism. As in World War I, Great Britain was in a patriotic fervour throughout World War II to protect itself from foreign invasion. Women, for the first time, were given the opportunity to help in their native land's defense, which explains the high number of female volunteers at the beginning of the war. Despite the overwhelming response to the call for female volunteers, some women refused to join the forces; many were unwilling to give up the civilian job they had, and others had male counterparts that were unwilling to let them go. Others felt that war was still a man's job, and not something women should be involved in. Similar to the men's forces, women's forces were mostly volunteer throughout the war. When women's conscription did come into effect, however, it was highly limited. For example, married women were exempt from any obligation to serve unless they chose to do so, and those who were called could opt to serve in civil defense (the home front).

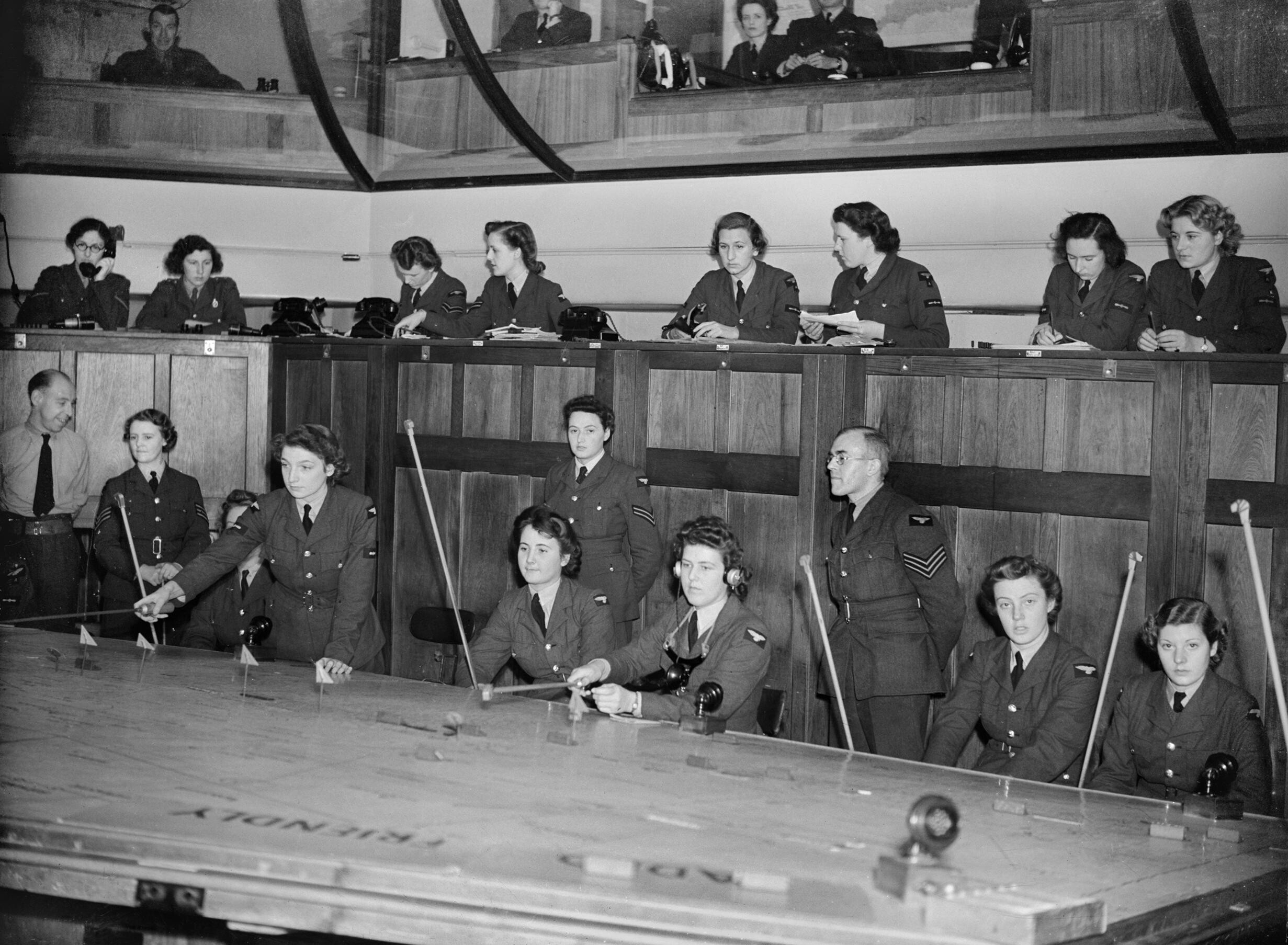
WAAF plotters at work in the Operations Room at No. 11 Group RAF at Uxbridge in Middlesex, 1942

During the war, approximately 487,000 women volunteered for women's services; 80,000 for WRNS, 185,000 for WAAF and 222,000 for ATS. By 1941 the demands of the wartime industry called for women's services to be expanded so that more men could be relieved of their previous positions and take on more active roles on the battle field. Of all the women's services, ATS needed the greatest number of new applicants; however due to ATS' lack of popularity, they were unable to gain the estimated 100,000 new volunteers needed. To try and change women's opinions on ATS, living conditions were improved and a new more flattering uniform was made. In 1941 the Registration for Employment Order was introduced in hopes of getting more women enrolled. This act could not force women to join the forces, but instead required women aged from 20–30 to try to find employment through labour exchanges and provide information on their current employment and family situations. Those who were deemed eligible were persuaded into the war industry because the Ministry of Labour did not have the power to force.

Propaganda was also used to persuade women into the women's services. By the end of 1941, ATS had only gained 58,000 new workers, falling short of expectations. Ernest Bevin then called for conscription and by late 1941 with the National Service Act it became compulsory for women aged from 20–30 to join military service. Married women were exempt from conscription, but those who were eligible had the option to work in war industry or civil defense if they did not want to join one of the services. Women were able to request which force they wished to join but most women were put into ATS because of its need for new applicants. The National Service Act was repealed in 1949 but by 1944 women were no longer being called up for service because relying on volunteers was thought to be enough to complete the required tasks during the final stages of war.

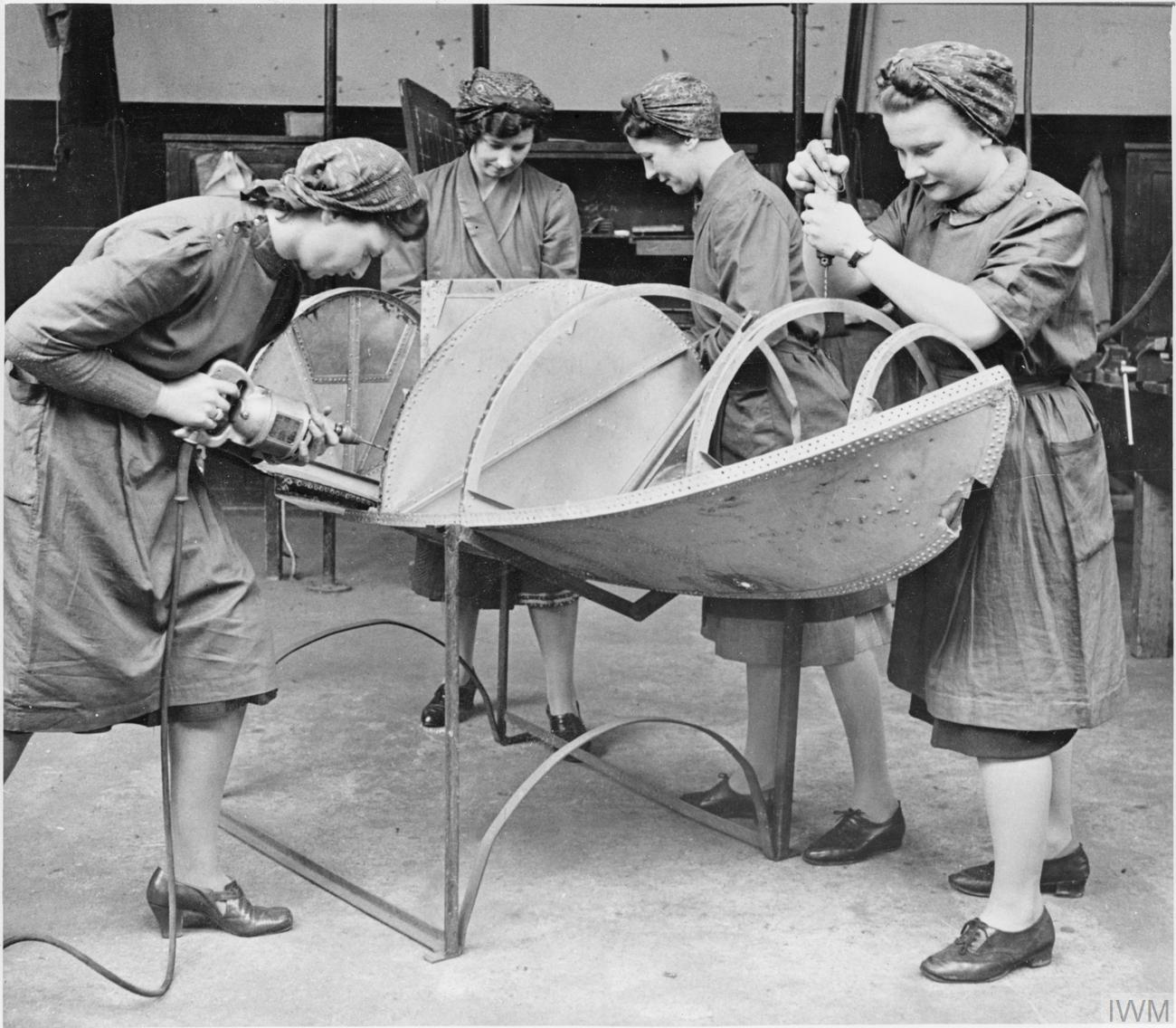
Four women workers at Slough Training Centre work on the construction of a seaplane float

Women also played an important role in British industrial production during the war, in areas such as metals, chemicals, munitions, shipbuilding and engineering. At the beginning of the war in 1939 17.8% of women made up employment in these industries and by 1943 they made up 38.2%. With the start of the war there was an urgent need to expand the country's labour force and women were seen as a source of factory labour. Before the war, women in industrial production worked exclusively on assembly, which was seen as cheap and undemanding work, but during the war women were needed in other areas of the production process that had previously been carried out by men, such as Lathe operation. The Ministry of Labour created training centres that gave an introduction to the engineering process, and by 1941 women were allowed entrance as the importance of the engineering industry grew and became a large source of female employment. Areas such as aircraft manufacture, light and heavy general engineering and motor vehicle manufacturing all saw an increase in female employment during the war.

Aircraft production saw the largest rise in female employment as it rose from 7% in 1935 to 40% in 1944. At the start of the war men who were already in engineering were prevented from going to war because engineering was seen as an important industry to war production but in 1940 there became a need for more female workers to supply the necessary labour for factory expansion. By 1941 with the shortage of skilled labour the Essential Workers Order was introduced which required all skilled workers to register and prevented workers from quitting from jobs that were deemed essential to the war effort without agreement from a National Service Officer. The Registration for the Employment Order in 1941 and the Women of Employment Order in 1942 also attempted to get more women into the workforce. The Women of Employment Order required women ages 18–45 to register for labour exchanges and by 1943 the maximum age was raised to 50, which brought an additional 20,000 women into the workforce. Aircraft production was given the top labour priority and many women were diverted into it with some even being transferred from agricultural production.

==== Interpretation of aerial photographs ====
A vital job was interpreting aerial photographs taken by British spy planes over Allied Europe. There was equality in this work that was not found anywhere else during the war: women were considered equal to men in this field. Women played a role in the planning of D-Day in this capacity – they analyzed the photos of the Normandy Coast. Women as photo analysts also participated in the biggest intelligence coup of the war – the discovery of the German V1 flying bomb. The participation of women allowed these bombs to be destroyed.

==== Civilian pay scales ====
Although many women were doing jobs that men had previously done during the war, there were still pay distinctions between the two sexes. Women's pay was significantly lower than men's pay. The average female in manufacturing was earning $31 per week while the average male earned $55 per week. Equal pay was rarely achieved as employers wanted to avoid labour costs. Skilled work was often broken down into smaller tasks and labelled skilled or semi-skilled and then paid according to women's pay rates. Women who were judged to be doing "men's work" were paid more than women who were thought to be doing "women's work" and the employers' definition of this varied regionally. Women were receiving closer wages to their male counterparts; however despite the government's expressed intentions, women continued to be paid less than men for equivalent work and were segregated in terms of job description, status, and the hours they put in.

In 1940 Ernest Bevin persuaded engineering employers and unions to give women equal pay to men since they were taking on the same tasks that men previously had; this became the Extended Employment of Women Agreement. Generally, pay increases depended on the industry; industries that were dominated by women before the war, like textiles and clothing, saw no changes in pay. However the gap between male and female earnings narrowed by 20–24% in metals, engineering and vehicle building and by 10–13% in chemicals, which were all deemed important to the war effort. Overtime hours also differed, with women getting 2–3 hours and men 9–10 a week. Women's hours were still regulated because of their perceived responsibilities to take care of their family and household.

==== High profile ====
The British gave high prestige to their women's units who therefore escaped much of the vulgar commentary. The two daughters of Prime Minister Churchill were both in uniform. In February 1945, Princess Elizabeth joined the Women's Auxiliary Territorial Service as an honorary second subaltern with the service number of 230873. She was a driver for the Second Subaltern Windsor Unit.

==== Post-war ====
Post-war, women turned to marriage or to civilian jobs. The Army returned to the male-dominated field it was before the war. "[Demobilisation] was a big disappointment to a lot of us. It was an awful and wonderful war. I wouldn't have missed it for anything; some of the friends we made were forever" one female recounted after being dismissed from service to return to her normal job. Married women were released from service sooner at the end of the war, so they could return home before their husbands to ensure the home was ready when he returned from the front. Despite being largely unrecognised for their wartime efforts in the forces, the participation of women in World War II allowed for the founding of permanent women's forces. Britain instituted these permanent forces in 1949, and the Women's Voluntary Services are still a standing reserve force today.

==== British India ====
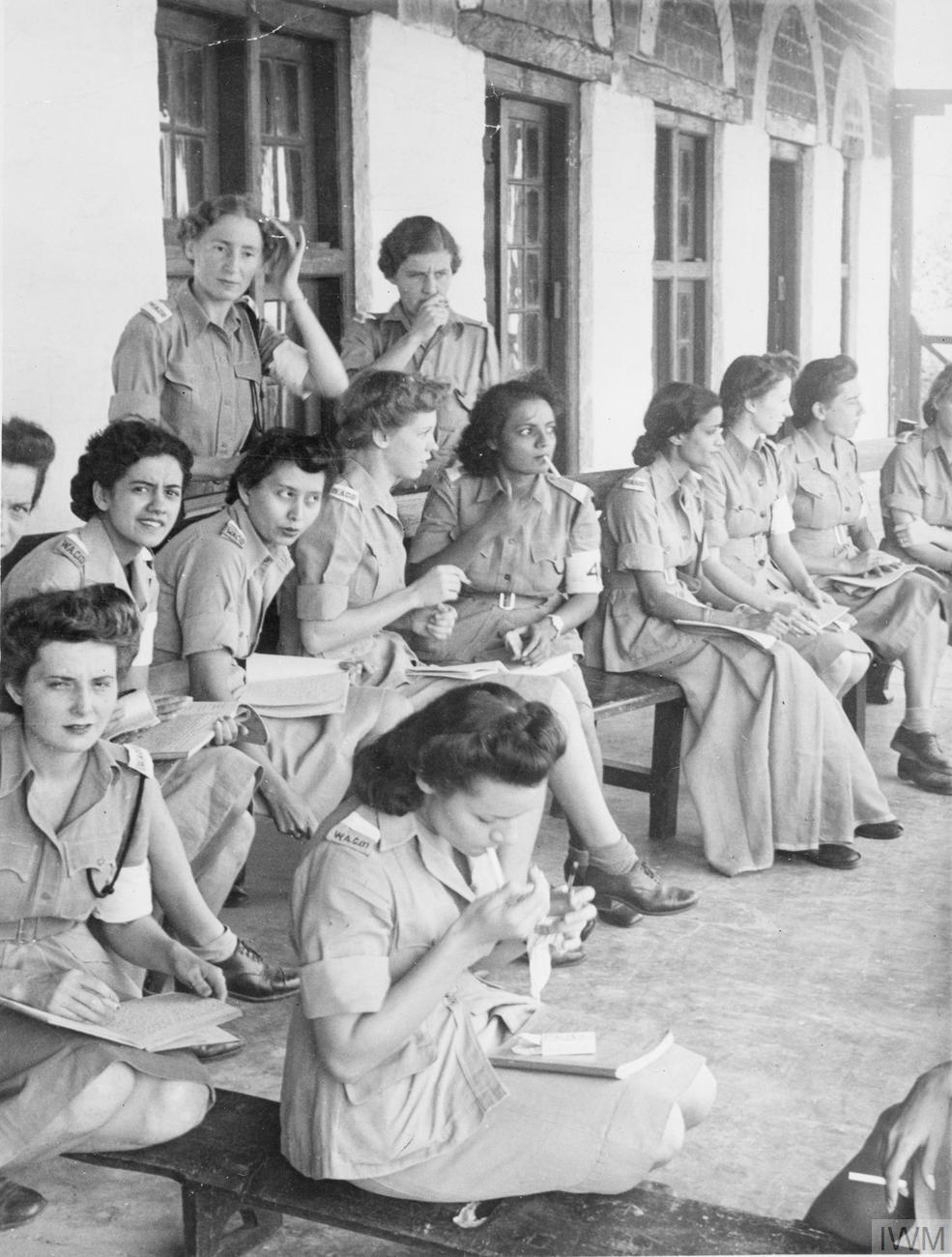
Women train to become officers of the Indian Women's Auxiliary Corps

In British India, policies resembled those of Great Britain, except that women were not used in anti-aircraft units, and there was no conscription of women for munitions work.

The Women's Auxiliary Corps operated from 1939 to 1947, with peak strength of 850 officers and 7,200 auxiliaries in the Indian army. A small naval section operated in the Royal Indian Navy.

The nationalist and pro-independence movements in India during the war split on the decision to undertake military service. Mahatma Gandhi opposed fascism and on his advice youths from India joined the armed forces to fight with Britain alongside her allies.

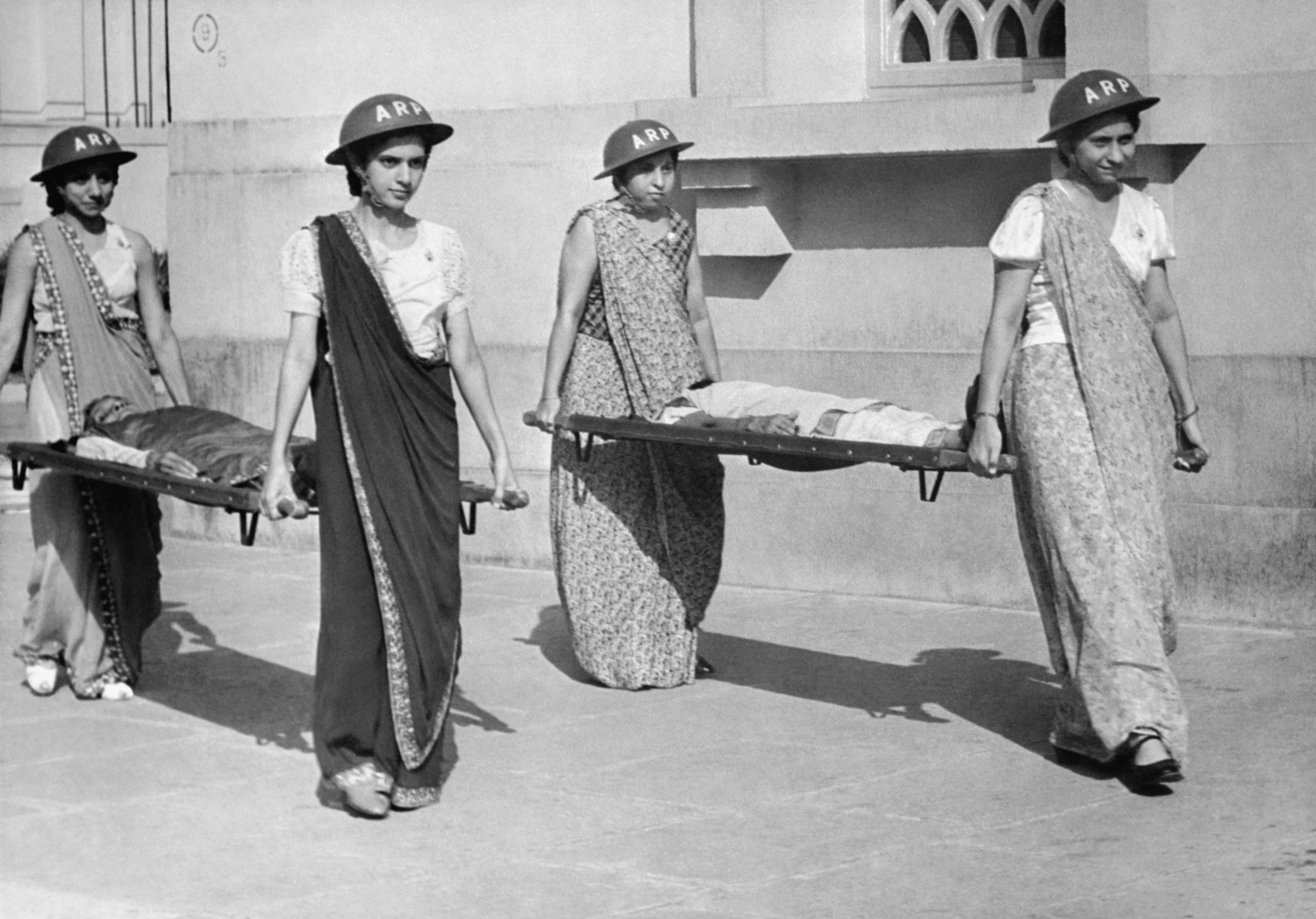
Women train for air raid precaution (ARP) duties in Bombay, 1942

One faction of Congress led by Subhas Chandra Bose was so opposed that it cooperated with Nazi Germany, and actually enlisted soldiers who fought alongside Japanese soldiers in the Burma campaign. The "Rani of Jhansi Regiment" involved these women in combat on behalf of the Indian National Army. It was active from 1943–45. Bose spent a good deal of effort on developing a nationalist ideology designed to mobilize models of women as mothers and sisters in the Indian tradition. Bose argued that the direct involvement of women was necessary to achieve total independence of India from colonial rule. Bose articulated a modern definition of female heroism that involved combat. Some of his female soldiers were directly involved in combat; they largely had support roles in logistics and medical care.

=== United States ===
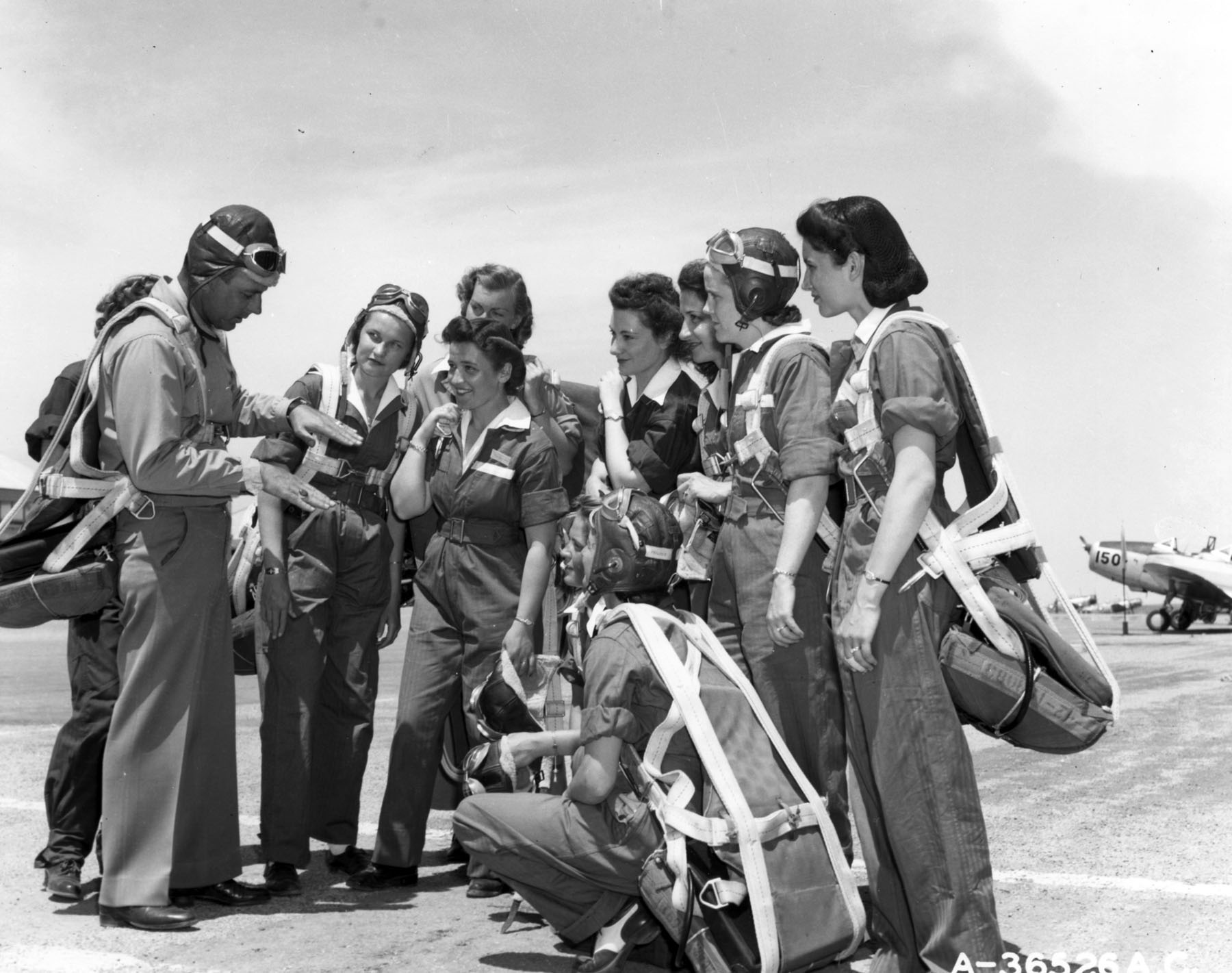
WASP trainees In 1944; they flew warplanes inside the United States until they were replaced by returning male pilots

=== Yugoslavia ===
Yugoslavia was dissolved during the war, but the resistance units were active. The Communist Yugoslav National Liberation Movement claimed 6,000,000 civilian supporters; its two million women formed the Antifascist Front of Women (AFŽ), in which the revolutionary coexisted with the traditional. The AFŽ managed schools, hospitals and local governments. About 100,000 women served with 600,000 men in Tito's Yugoslav National Liberation Army. It stressed its dedication to women's rights and gender equality and used the imagery of traditional folklore heroines to attract and legitimize the partizanka. After the war, women were relegated to traditional gender roles, but Yugoslavia is unique as its historians paid extensive attention to women's roles in the resistance, until the country broke up in the 1990s. Then the memory of the female soldiers faded away.

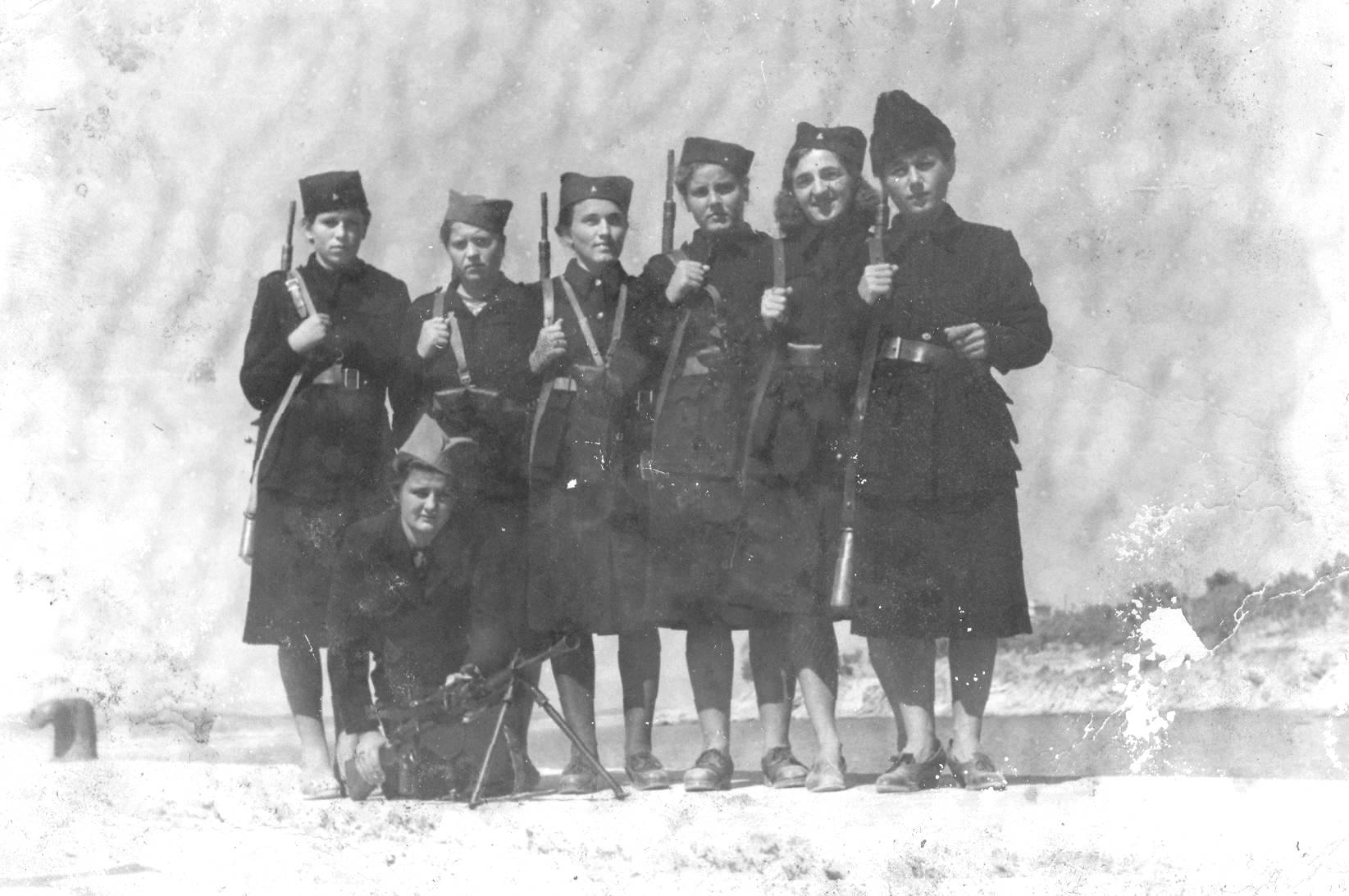
Women in Chetnik units

The Chetniks (Serbo-Croatian: Четници, Četnici, pronounced [tʃɛ̂tniːtsi]; Slovene: Četniki), formally the Chetnik Detachments of the Yugoslav Army, and also the Yugoslav Army in the Homeland (Serbo-Croatian: Југословенска војска у отаџбини, Jugoslovenska vojska u otadžbini; Slovene: Jugoslovanska vojska v domovini) and the Ravna Gora Movement, was a Yugoslav royalist and Serbian nationalist movement and guerrilla force in Axis-occupied Yugoslavia. Although it was not a homogeneous movement, it was led by Draža Mihailović. While it was anti-Axis in its long-term goals and engaged in marginal resistance activities for limited periods, it also engaged in tactical or selective collaboration with Axis forces for almost all of the war. Chetnik policies barred women from performing significant roles. No women took part in fighting units and women were restricted to nursing and occasional intelligence work. The low status of female peasants in areas of Yugoslavia where Chetniks were strongest could have been utilized and advantageous in military, political, and psychological terms. The treatment of women was a fundamental difference between the Chetniks and Partisans and Chetnik propaganda disparaged the female role in the Partisans. Ruth Mitchell (c. 1889–1969) was a reporter who was the only American woman to serve with the Chetniks. Fluent in German, she worked for the Chetniks as a spy and a courier for about a year.

== Axis and associated countries ==
=== Finland ===
Finnish women took part in defence: nursing, air raid signaling, rationing and hospitalization of the wounded. Their organization was called Lotta Svärd, named after the poem, where voluntary women took part in auxiliary work of the armed forces to help those fighting on the front. Lotta Svärd was one of the largest, if not the largest, voluntary group in World War II.

=== Germany ===
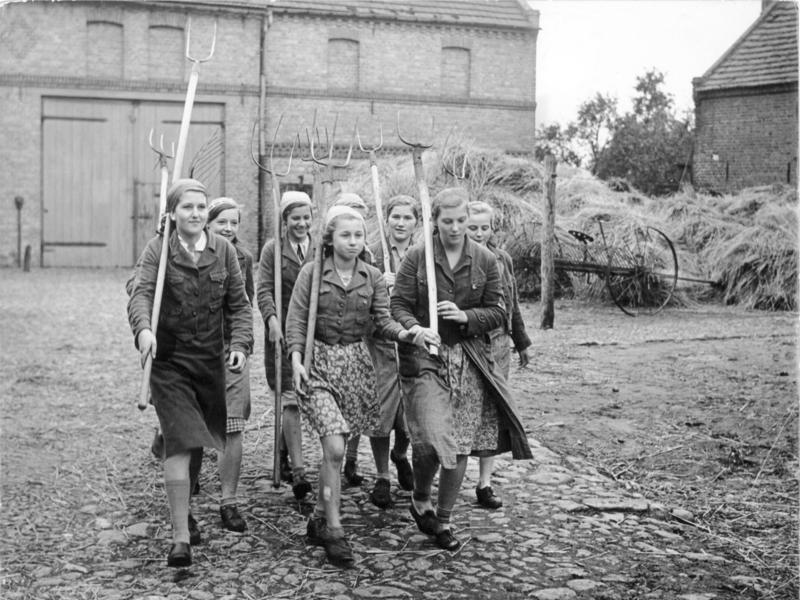
The caption in the propaganda magazine Das Deutsche Mädel (May 1942 issue) states: "bringing all the enthusiasm and life force of their youth, our young daughters of the Work Service make their contribution in the German territories 'regained' in the East.

The majority of German girls were members of League of German Girls (BDM). The BDM helped the war effort in many ways.

On the eve of war 14.6 million German women were working, with 51% of women of working age (16–60 years old) in the workforce. Nearly six million were doing farm work, as Germany's agricultural economy was dominated by small family farms. 2.7 million worked in industry. When the German economy was mobilized for war it paradoxically led to a drop in female work participation, reaching a low of 41% before gradually climbing back to over 50% again. This still compares favorably with the UK and the US, both playing catchup, with Britain achieving a participation rate of 41% of women of working age in 1944. However, in terms of women employed in war work, British and German female participation rates were nearly equal by 1944, with the United States still lagging. The difficulties the Third Reich faced in increasing the size of the work force was mitigated by reallocating labor to work that supported the war effort. High wages in war industries attracted hundreds of thousands, freeing up men for military duties. Prisoners of war were also employed as farmhands, freeing up women for other work.

Women who joined the SS-Helferinnenkorps (lit. 'SS Women’s Auxiliary Corps') were considered part of the SS community (Sippengemeinschaft) and were formally recognized as auxiliary members of the Waffen-SS. The SS-Helferinnenkorps, was an organization created aiming to free men for combat by assigning women to non-combat support roles such as administration, communications, and logistics. It was the explicit intention of Heinrich Himmler to create a “sister organisation to the Schutzstaffel”. The corps offered a means to tie women permanently to the SS through a combination of technical instruction and “world-view education”. Around 10,000 women served in the SS-Helferinnenkorps, in addition to 15,000 police auxiliaries. Their presence stretched from the offices of the Reich Security Main Office in Berlin to the concentration camps.

Women in the SS-Gefolge (lit. 'SS entourage') served as civilian employees without formal SS membership, part of the "clan association" (Sippenverband) and affiliated with the Waffen-SS, but did not wear the Totenkopf insignia despite links to the male-only SS-Totenkopfverbände; their roles were primarily administrative. As SS-Gefolge, they worked as guards and auxiliaries in Nazi concentration camps, with ~3,517 female guards (10% of total) recorded in January 1945, including ~200 at Auschwitz (1940–1945). Trained often at Ravensbrück, they took loyalty oaths, enforced camp policies tied to the Holocaust, sterilization, and euthanasia, and supervised prisoners, aiding Nazi racial policies without formal violent training.

Women also served in auxiliary units in the navy (Kriegshelferinnen), air force (Luftnachrichtenhelferinnen) and army (Nachrichtenhelferin). During the war more than 500,000 women were volunteer uniformed auxiliaries in the German armed forces (Wehrmacht). About the same number served in civil aerial defense, 400,000 volunteered as nurses, and many more replaced drafted men in the wartime economy. In the Luftwaffe they served in auxiliary roles helping to operate the anti-aircraft systems that shot down Allied bombers on the German homefront. By 1945, German women were holding 85% of the billets as clericals, accountants, interpreters, laboratory workers, and administrative workers, together with half of the clerical and junior administrative posts in high-level field headquarters.

Germany had a very large and well organized nursing service, with four main organizations, one for Catholics, one for Protestants, the secular DRK (Red Cross) and the "Brown Nurses", for committed Nazi women. Military nursing was primarily handled by the DRK, which came under partial Nazi control. Frontline medical services were provided by male medics and doctors. Red Cross nurses served widely within the military medical services, staffing the hospitals that perforce were close to the front lines and at risk of bombing attacks. Two dozen were awarded the Iron Cross for heroism under fire. In contrast, the brief historiography Nurses in Nazi Germany by Bronwyn Rebekah McFarland-Icke (1999) focuses on the dilemmas of German nurses forced to look the other way while their incapacitated patients were murdered.

==== German military brothels ====
A local Italian girl feeds grapes to a British Eighth Army soldier in Sicily in August 1943, following the Allied invasion of Sicily.

=== Italy ===
==== Italian Social Republic ====
Mussolini's Italian Social Republic, a puppet state of Nazi Germany, gave their women roles as "birthing machines" and as combatants in paramilitary units and police formations (Servizio Ausiliario Femminile). The commander was the brigadier general Piera Gatteschi Fondelli.

=== Japan ===
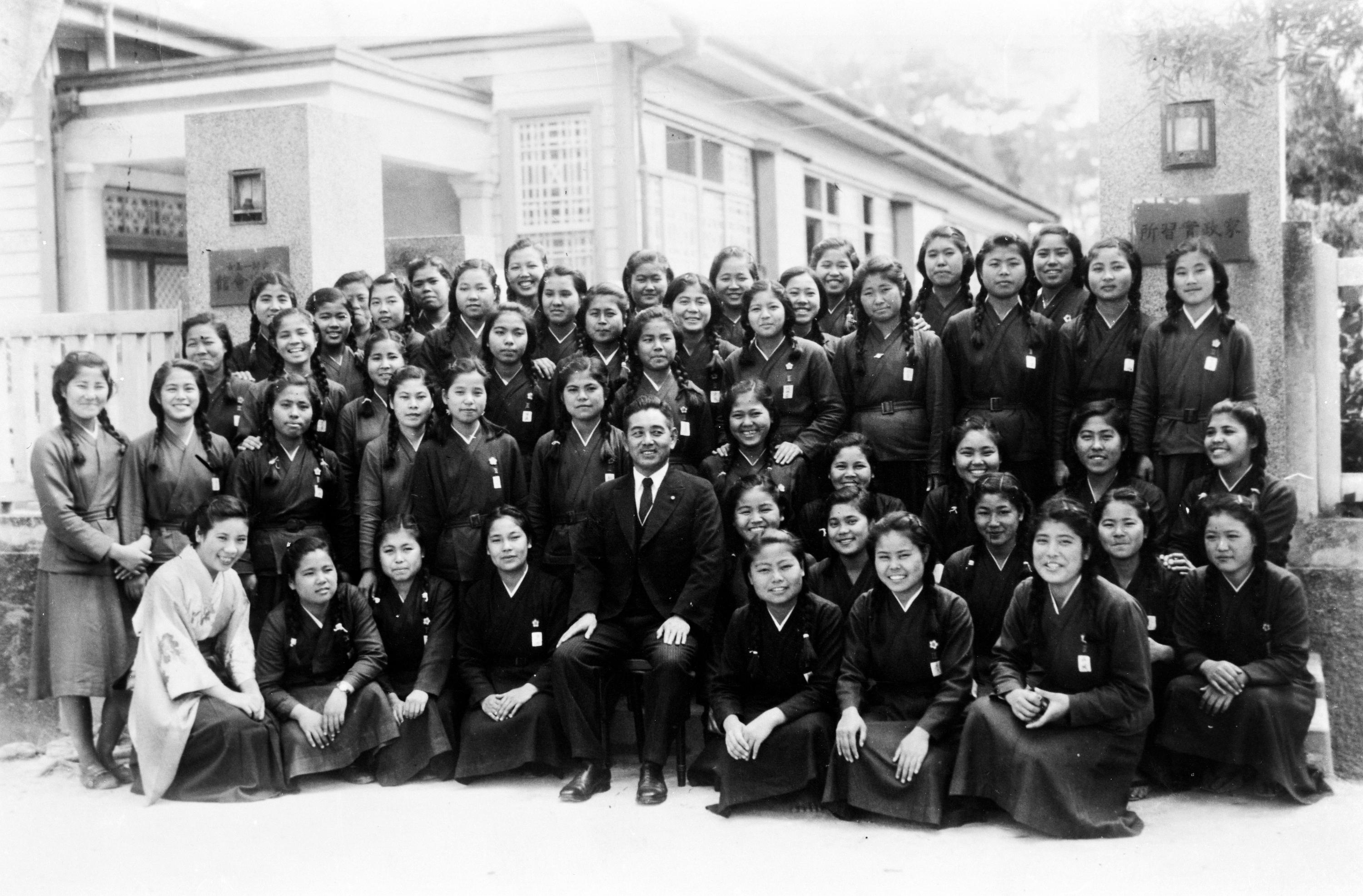
A class of Himeyuri students prior to mobilization

Japanese women were typically not formed into auxiliary units. However, in some cases, such as the civilian resistance in Okinawa to the American invasion, they performed informal services. On Okinawa, the students and faculty of Daiichi Women's High School and Shihan Women's School were mobilized as a nursing unit by the Japanese army.

Military nurses participated in medical experiments.

==== Comfort women ====
Comfort women were women and girls forced into sexual slavery by the Imperial Japanese Army before and during World War II. The name "comfort women" is a translation of the Japanese euphemism ianfu (慰安婦) and the similar Korean term wianbu (위안부). Ianfu is a euphemism for shōfu (娼婦) whose meaning is "prostitute(s)".

Estimates vary as to how many women were involved, with numbers ranging from as low as 20,000 to as high as 360,000 to 410,000, in Chinese sources; the exact numbers are still being researched and debated. Many of the women were from occupied countries, including Korea, China, and the Philippines, although women from Burma, Thailand, Vietnam, Malaysia, Taiwan (then a Japanese dependency), Indonesia (then the Dutch East Indies), Timor Leste (then Portuguese Timor), and other Japanese-occupied territories were used for military "comfort stations". Stations were located in Japan, China, the Philippines, Indonesia, then Malaya, Thailand, Burma, New Guinea, Hong Kong, Macau, and French Indochina. A smaller number of women of European origin from the Netherlands and Australia were also involved.

According to testimony, young women from countries in Japanese control were abducted from their homes. In many cases, women were also lured with promises of work in factories or restaurants; once recruited, the women were incarcerated in comfort stations in foreign lands.

=== Romania ===
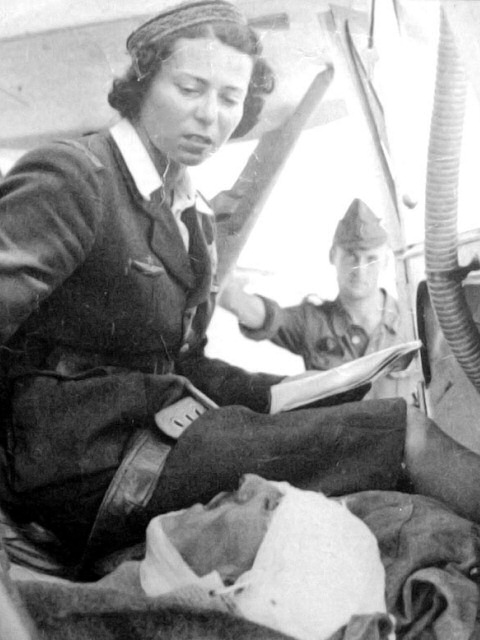
Pilot Mariana Drăgescu ready to take off with a wounded man on board, September 1942

Romanian women played a role in the Royal Romanian Air Force. Inspired by the Finnish Lotta Svärd, the Ministry of the Air set up a specialized air ambulance unit called the 108th Medevac Light Transport Squadron, better known as the White Squadron (Escadrila Albă), which included mostly female pilots and included Mariana Drăgescu, Nadia Russo, Virginia Thomas, and Marina Știrbei. The unit was active between 1940–1943, participated in the campaigns at Odessa and Stalingrad and rose to fame during the war as the only unit of its kind in the world. Romanian women also served as pilots in other transport and liaison units during the war. Captain Irina Burnaia, for example, commanded the Bessarabian Squadron between 1942–1944.

After the war and the Communist seizure of power in Romania, the White Squadron's service was largely ignored and its former members faded into obscurity. However, since the Romanian Revolution there has been a new wave of recognition of the female aviators, as exemplified by Mariana Drăgescu's promotion to the rank of Commander (Comandor) in 2013.

== Cultural icons ==
Civil

- (United States) Naomi Parker
- (Soviet Union) Pasha Angelina
- (United Kingdom) Ruby Loftus
- (Canada) Veronica Foster

Military

- (United States) Elizabeth L. Gardner
- (Soviet Union) Lyudmila Pavlichenko
- (Nazi Germany) Hanna Reitsch
- (Nazi Germany) Thea Rasche
- (Nazi Germany) Elly Beinhorn
- (Nazi Germany) Melitta Schenk Gräfin von Stauffenberg
- (United States) Jacqueline Cochran

== See also ==
- Historiography of World War II#Women
