= Elizabeth Gardner =

Elizabeth Gardner may refer to:

- Elizabeth Gardner (athlete) (born 1980), Australian freestyle skier
- Elizabeth Gardner (physicist) (1957–1988), British theoretical physicist
- Elizabeth Jane Gardner (1837–1922), American painter
- Elizabeth L. Gardner (1921–2011), American pilot

== See also ==
- Elizabeth Gardiner (born 1966), British solicitor
- Elizabeth Garner (1892–1973), Scottish author and politician
