= Order of Aeronautical Virtue =

Ordinul "Virtutea Aeronautică"
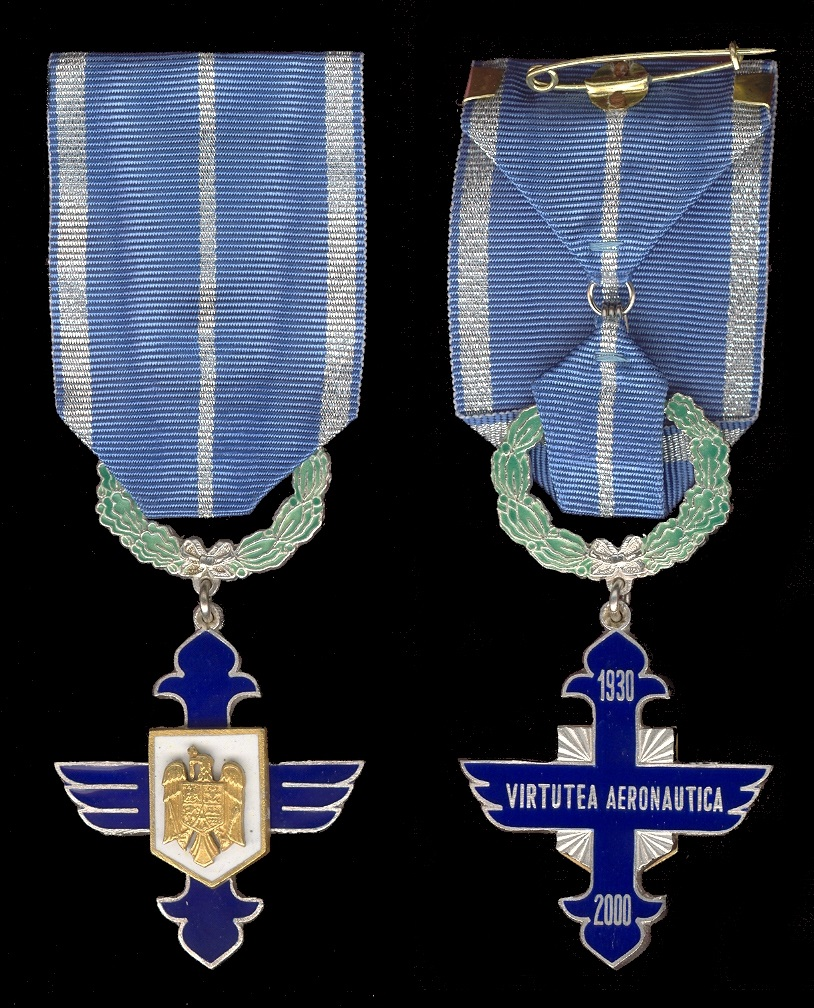
- Order of Aeronautical Virtue, Knight rank (Obverse and reverse)
- Type: Order
- Country: Romania
- Presented by: The King of Romania (1930–1947); The President of Romania
- Eligibility: Military and Civilians
- Established: 31 July 1930
- Ribbon for the Order of Aeronautical Virtue

Precedence
- Next (higher): Ordinul național "Pentru Merit"
- Equivalent: Ordinul "Virtutea Militară"; Ordinul "Virtutea Maritimă"; Ordinul "Bărbăție și Credință"

The Order of Aeronautical Virtue (Romanian: Ordinul "Virtutea Aeronautică") is a Romanian military decoration created by King Carol II on 31 July 1930. Originally, the Order had three ranks: Knight, Officer and Commander, as well as a "Golden Cross" rank as the lowest one. The first two ranks could be awarded three times consecutively, with a metal bar attached to the ribbon for each new decoration. Today, the order maintains the "classic" ranks of Knight, Officer and Commander, and Grand Officer, and can no longer be awarded consecutively.

== History ==
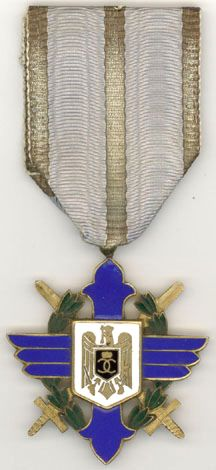
Order of the Aeronautical Virtue, Officer rank

The Order was founded by King Carol II to reward aviators. His decision was taken after the fact that he was able to return to the country and win the throne with the help of some aviators from the 2nd Aviation Flotilla who brought him by air, circumventing his border restrictions. While medals and crosses appeared since World War I, the new award instituted by Carol was the first Order to be given to aviators, Romania thus becoming the first country to have a military order for aviators. The new distinction had the following ranks: the Golden Cross rank, followed by the Knight, Officer, and Commander ranks. The first two degrees could be awarded three times consecutively, a metal bar being attached to the ribbon each time. This practice was unheard of for any Romanian decoration until then.

The decoration had the form of a cross, similar to the Order of Michael the Brave, with the horizontal arms being in the shape of stylized wing. On the obverse, a white enameled shield was applied which featured the Romanian eagle with the cypher of Carol II in the center. This cypher will be changed to Michael I's in 1940. On the reverse, the year of establishment, "1930", was inscribed. The ranks of Officer and Commander had, an oval wreath of green enameled laurel leaves between the arms of the cross. The Golden Cross was made of unenamelled gilt metal. The "war" model, presented for feats of arms of the aviators, added two crossed swords between the arms of the cross.

Following its establishment, the Order was placed above the Order of the Star of Romania, thus becoming the third order in the national hierarchy. From December 1938, the Aeronautical Virtue was moved below the Order of the Crown of Romania, only to be moved again to its original place in 1941.

=== Medal of Aeronautical Virtue ===
In addition to the order, a Medal of Aeronautical Virtue was created on 24 February 1931. Originally named the Aeronautical Medal, and having three classes, the Medal was intended for aeronautical personnel on the ground. In 1938, it was slightly renamed to the "Medal of Aeronautical Virtue".

The Medal was circular in shape, featuring an effigy of a young woman wearing an aviator helmet on the obverse, while the reverse had a small coat of arms of Romania flanked by two stylized wings, which separated a semi-wreath of laurel leaves with the inscription "PENTRU AERONAUTICĂ/1931" in the center. The "war" model, created in 1938, received two crossed swords, and a royal crown above the insignia.

After the fall of communism in 1989, the Aeronautical Virtue order and medal were reinstituted. The new insignia of the Order kept the traditions of the 1930 model. The main changes to the Order were that it no longer kept the Golden Cross rank, while the rank of Grand Officer was added. Also, the first two ranks can no longer be awarded consecutively. Both military and civilian Romanian aviators can be decorated for ordinary merits, as in all activities.

== Notable recipients ==
- Horia Agarici (1942)
- Dumitru Bădulescu (1930)
- Gheorghe Bănciulescu
- Richard E. Byrd (1930s)
- Smaranda Brăescu (1931)
- Constantin Cantacuzino (1941)
- Otto Deßloch
- Ioan Dicezare (1943)
- Mariana Drăgescu
- Alexander Löhr (1941)
- Erhard Milch
- Dumitru Prunariu (2010)
- Nadia Russo (1938)
- Alexandru Șerbănescu (1944)
- Ilie Șteflea

=== Military units decorated with the Order ===
- Romanian Air Force 90th Airlift Base (2019)
- Air Force Application School "Aurel Vlaicu" (2010)

== Gallery ==
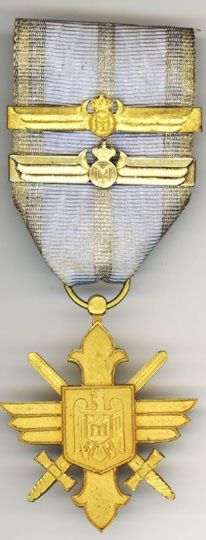
Golden Cross rank with two bars, obverse

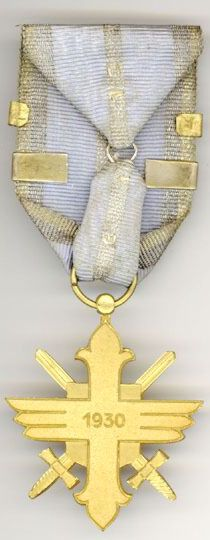
Golden Cross rank with two bars, reverse

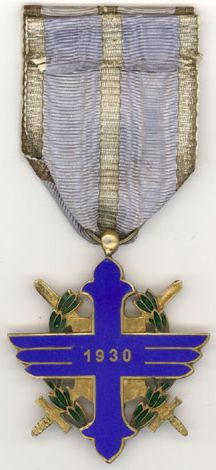
Reverse of the Officer rank of the Order

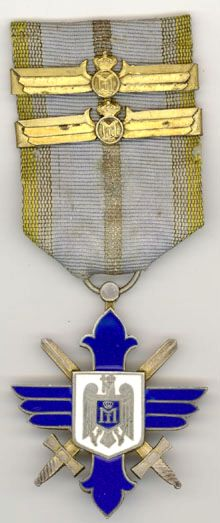
Order of the Aeronautical Virtue, Knight rank with two bars, post-1940.

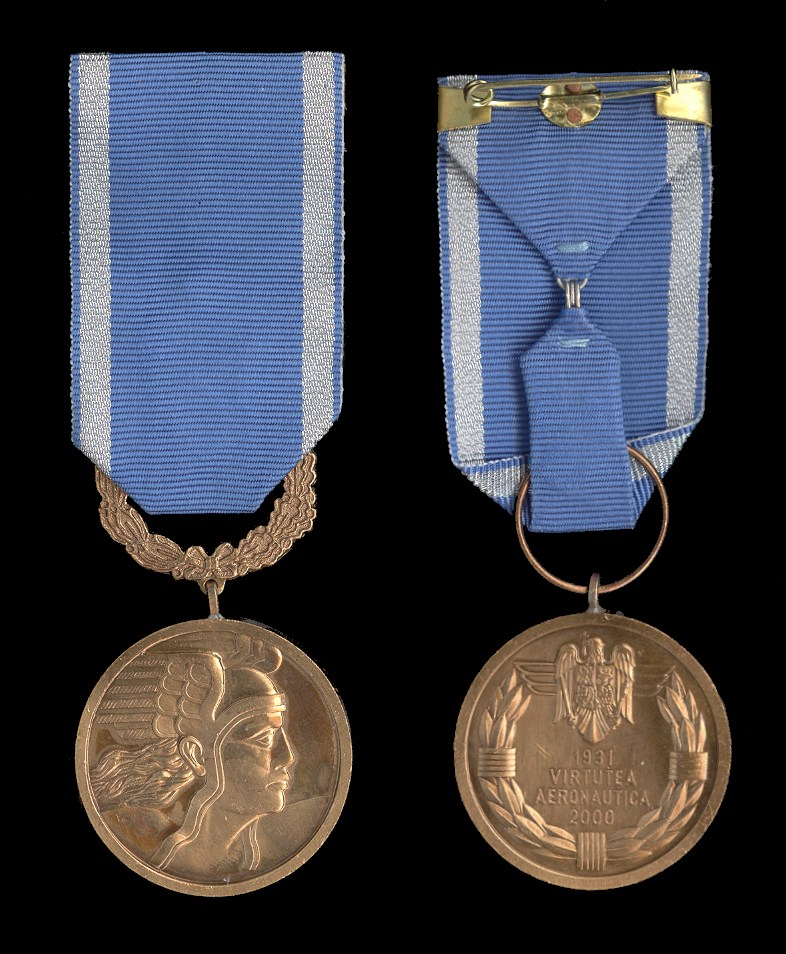
Current Aeronautical Virtue Medal, 3rd Class. Military personnel (obverse); civilians (reverse).
