= Mariana Drăgescu =

Romanian pilot

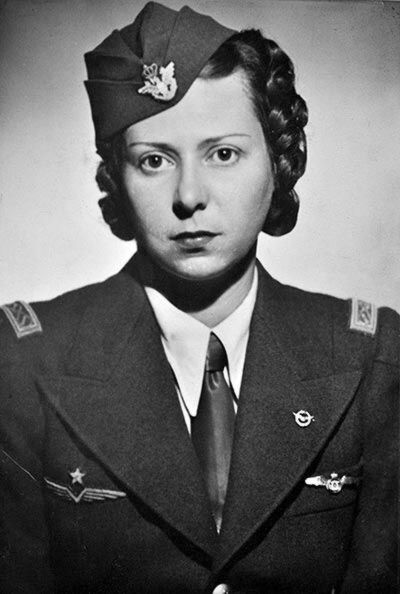
- Cmd.av. Mariana Drăgescu (pictured, 2nd lt)
- Born: 7 September 1912; Craiova, Kingdom of Romania
- Died: 24 March 2013 (aged 100); Bucharest, Romania
- Burial place: Sihăstria Putnei Monastery
- Military career
- Allegiance: (Romania)
- Branch: Romanian Air Force
- Service years: 1940–1955
- Rank: Comandor (OF-5)
- Unit: White Squadron
- Conflicts: World War II; Siege of Odessa; Crimean campaign; Battle of Stalingrad
- Awards: Order of the Star of Romania, Order of Aeronautical Virtue, Order of the German Eagle

Marie Ana Aurelia (Mariana) Drăgescu (7 September 1912 – 24 March 2013) was a Romanian military aviator during World War II. She was the last surviving member of the White Squadron, a team of female aviators who flew medical aircraft during World War II. Romania was the only country in the world to allow women to pilot medical missions during the war.

== Biography ==
Born 7 September 1912 in Craiova, Romania. Her mother was an "independent woman" and music teacher, and her father, a military man, had become a colonel after World War I. She recounted that her introduction to flying came at an early age.

"When the first world war started, I came to Bucharest with the whole family... I remember, I was 4 years old and I was with my mother on the street when I first heard the air alarm sirens. The German planes bombed Bucharest, with my mother in a basement, we would take shelter, but I was anxious to see the planes."

At age 23, Drăgescu received her pilot's license in 1935. She said later, "I obtained the seventh female patent in Romania." With the threat of conflict growing in Europe in 1938, Drăgescu was invited to join a new, all-female, aviation team which would become known as the White Squadron. The other four women to join with her were Virginia Thomas, Nadia Russo, Marina Știrbei, and Irina Burnaia (another pilot, Virginia Dutescu, had become ill, withdrew and never flew again).

Over the course of the war, the "White Squad" saved the lives of more than 1,500 soldiers injured on the front lines.

== Wartime flying ==
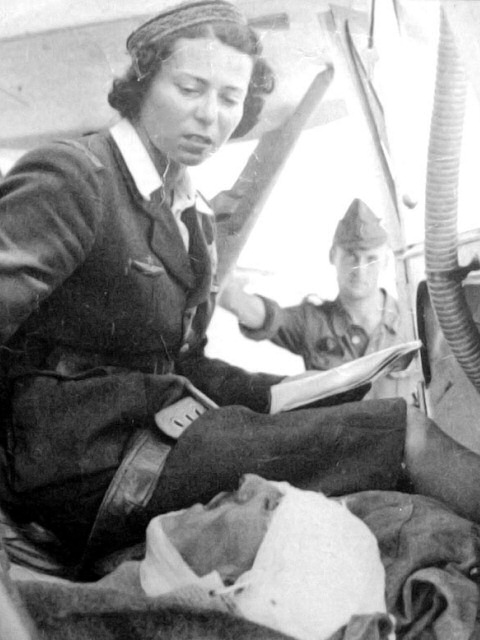
Pilot Drăgescu with a wounded soldier on board

The White Squadron was equipped with three small planes, painted white, with red crosses painted on the fuselage and wings. Once Romania was entered the war against the Soviet Union in June 1941, the squadron started flying wounded soldiers from the front lines to Bucharest for medical care. Drăgescu recounted later, "We were flying in the sky with the planes to the front line. And if we didn't have aerodromes near the place where we had to pick up the wounded, we had orders to land anywhere ... "

The White Squadron's pilots flew a maximum of 50 meters above the ground, to avoid pursuing aircraft, but were targeted when on the ground. After its first month of action, the squadron's aircraft were repainted in a camouflage paint.

Once on the ground, the young pilots, dressed in white overalls, startled some wounded soldiers as if they were hallucinating. One, on seeing Drăgescu, "started shouting at the orderly that was watching him: "John, an angel!" The poor man thought he had already died and was waiting to see Heaven ... "

Drăgescu flew in the siege of Odessa, the Crimean campaign, and the Battle of Stalingrad, and, after the other pilots' resignations and illnesses, she remained the only female Romanian pilot on the front.

== Final years ==
After the war, Drăgescu worked for several years as flight instructor at flight schools in Chitila and Ghimbav. She was allowed to fly until 1955, when her license was taken away. Later on she worked at the Ana Ipătescu C.F.R. clinic in Bucharest, until she retired in 1967.

During the country's communist era, the history of Romanian aviation and the contributions of Drăgescu and the other women of the White Squadron were ignored. Following the Romanian Revolution of 1989, their story received a more appropriate recognition.

Mariana Drăgescu was 100 when she died in Bucharest on 24 March 2013.

== Honors ==
- Knight of the Order of the Star of Romania
- Order of Aeronautical Virtue
- Order of the German Eagle

== Bibliography ==
- Craciunoiu, Cristian (February 2000). "Pilote à l'escadrille blanche" [Pilot in the White Squadron]. Avions: Toute l'aéronautique et son histoire (in French) (83): 29–37. ISSN 1243-8650.
- Craciunoiu, Cristian (March 2000). "Pilote à l'escadrille blanche". Avions: Toute l'aéronautique et son histoire (in French) (84): 9–15. ISSN 1243-8650.
