= Marina Știrbei =

Romanian aviator

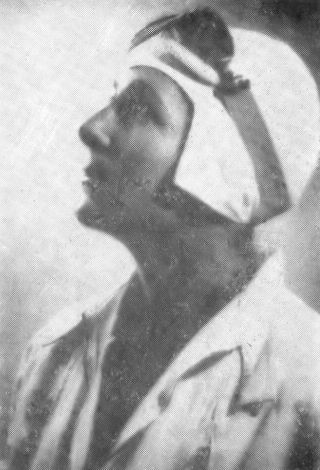
- Born: 19 March 1912; Vienna, Austria
- Died: 15 July 2001 (aged 89); Bouloc, France
- Occupation: Aviator
- Known for: Founding member of the Romanian Air Force's all-women White Squadron

Marina Știrbei (19 March 1912 – 15 July 2001) was a Romanian aviator who gained fame in the Second World War as a founding member of the Romanian Air Force's all-women White Squadron, rescuing the wounded from the front lines. More recently, the Romanian press have called her the "Princess of Romanian aviation".

== Early life ==
Born on 19 March 1912 in Vienna, Austria, Marina Știrbei was the daughter of Prince George Știrbei, who was Barbu Știrbey's brother, and Elisabeth, niece of the pioneering aviator George Valentin Bibescu. After repeatedly being refused entrance to the Romanian Pilots School on the grounds she was a woman, in 1932 she was finally allowed to train there under Ioana Cantacuzino. She was granted her Grade II pilot's license in 1935. The following year, she won the first pilots contest in Romania.

== Career ==
Știrbei was the first to fly from Bucharest to Stockholm, encountering mist over the Baltic Sea. In June 1937, representing the Romanian Aeroclub, she took part in the first technical assistance conference in Budapest. In 1938, as a member of the Romanian Red Cross, together with other female aviators including Mariana Drăgescu and Nadia Russo, she participated in military exercises in the Galați region.

Inspired by the Finnish women's piloting initiative known as Lotta Svärd, she was successful in persuading the aviation ministry to form a women's squadron to help repatriate the wounded from the front lines. Known as the White Squadron, the unit was based at Baneasa. By 1940, the squadron consisted of 10 planes, ferrying doctors and medicines, and bringing back the wounded. The name White Squadron was given by the Italian journalist Curzio Malaparte, inspired by the white planes marked only by the sign of the Red Cross.

== Family ==
In 1942, Știrbei married Prince Constantin Basarab Brâncoveanu, celebrated with an extravagant aristocratic wedding reception. When the Communists took control in Romania, the prince was arrested and his property was confiscated. Știrbei raised her two children on her own, but in 1964 she managed to leave the country. After settling for a time in England, she moved to France.

== Death ==
Stirbei died in Bouloc, France on 15 July 2001.
