= Nadia Russo =

Romanian aviator

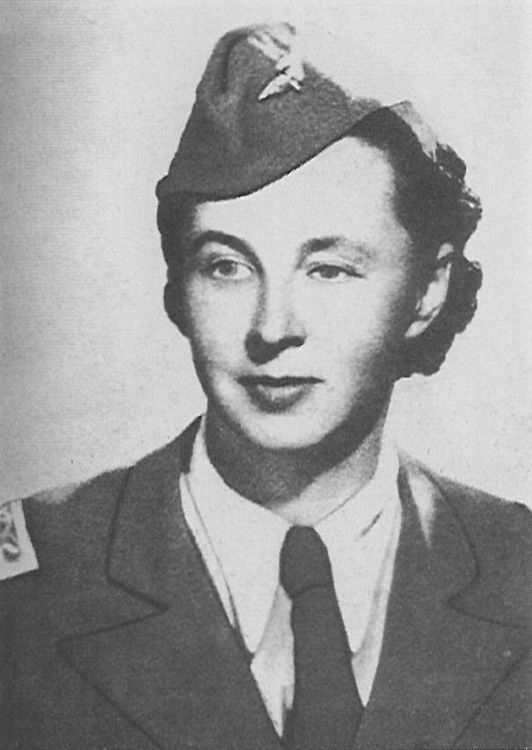
- Born: Nadejda Brjozovska; 17 June 1901; Tver, Russia
- Died: 22 January 1988 (aged 86); Bucharest, Romania
- Known for: Aviator
- Spouses: Alexandru Russo; Gheorghe Bossie

Nadia (Nadejda) Russo-Bossie (17 June 1901 – 22 January 1988) was a Russian White émigré and Romanian military aviator during World War II. She was a member of the White Squadron, a team of female aviators who flew medical aircraft during World War II. Romania was the only country in the world to allow women to pilot medical missions during the War.

== Biography ==
She was born Nadejda Brjozovska in Tver, Russia, near Moscow, in 1901. Her father was cavalry general Evgheni Vasilievici Brjozovski (1857–1915), and her mother came from an old aristocratic family. She became an orphan as a teenager.

After the Bolshevik revolution broke out in 1917, she and her sister were able to escape from a revolution-ridden Russia with the help of her father's former compatriots and took refuge in Bessarabia, which then became part of the Kingdom of Romania.

In 1925, she married a wealthy Bessarabian landlord, Alexandru (Sașa) Russo, who was much older than she. The marriage lasted only a few years before they separated and Nadia Russo went to Bucharest to pursue studies in nursing, aviation and fine arts.

=== Flying years ===
Nadia was only the ninth person in Romania to earn a pilot's license. In 1937, she arranged to buy her airplane, a Bücker Bü 131. Half of the purchase price was paid for by the Romanian Ministry of Air and the other half by public subscription.

With her personal plane, Nadia successfully represented Romania. In 1938, she flew in the Rally of the Little Antante and was the only competitor to travel the 4,000 kilometres (almost 2,500 miles) alone, without a flight attendant. As a result of that performance, King Carol II awarded her the Order "Aeronautical Virtue" of peace, the Golden Cross class.

With the threat of conflict growing in Europe in 1938, Nadia was invited to join a new, all-female, aviation team which would become known as the White Squadron. The other four women to join her were Mariana Drăgescu, Virginia Thomas, Marina Știrbei, and Irina Burnaia (another pilot, Virginia Dutescu, had become ill, withdrew and never flew again).

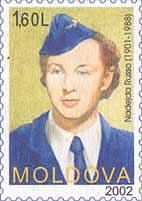
Stamp of Moldova.

Russo flew extensively during the Stalingrad campaign. In 1943, she retired from the White Squadron before the end of the war due to ill health. Over the course of the war, the pilots of the "White Squad" saved the lives of more than 1,500 soldiers injured on the front lines.

=== Imprisonment ===
After the War, despite her wartime heroics, Nadia Russo was prosecuted alongside other aviation officers who allegedly had contacts with the English military. In 1951, she was convicted and sentenced to seven years in prison and spent the next six years in prisons at Mislea and Miercurea Ciuc, Romania. In 1957, she was part of the Bărăgan deportations. In the camp, she found a new love and married Gheorghe Bossie, a man ten years younger.

=== Death ===
She died in Bucharest in 1988 at 86 years of age and was buried in the Resurrection Cemetery in Bucharest.

== Selected awards ==
- Gold Cross of the Order of Aeronautical Virtue with Swords (12 September 1941)
- Order of the German Eagle, 3rd class (Germany, 1942)
- Order of the Queen Marie Cross, 3rd class (1943)
