= White Squadron (Romania) =

Royal Romanian Air Force squadron

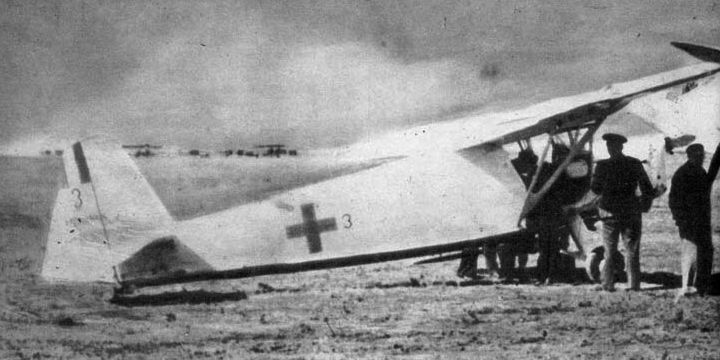
Casualties boarding a White Squadron RWD 13S in 1941

The White Squadron (Escadrila Albă) or Escadrila 108 Transport ușor was a Royal Romanian Air Force squadron of air ambulances piloted by women during World War II. They flew Polish RWD 13S planes.

The 1944 Italian-Romanian film Squadriglia Bianca was inspired by the squadron's story.

== Notable pilots ==
- Smaranda Brăescu
- Mariana Drăgescu
- Marina Știrbei
- Nadia Russo
