= Elizabeth L. Gardner =

American aviator

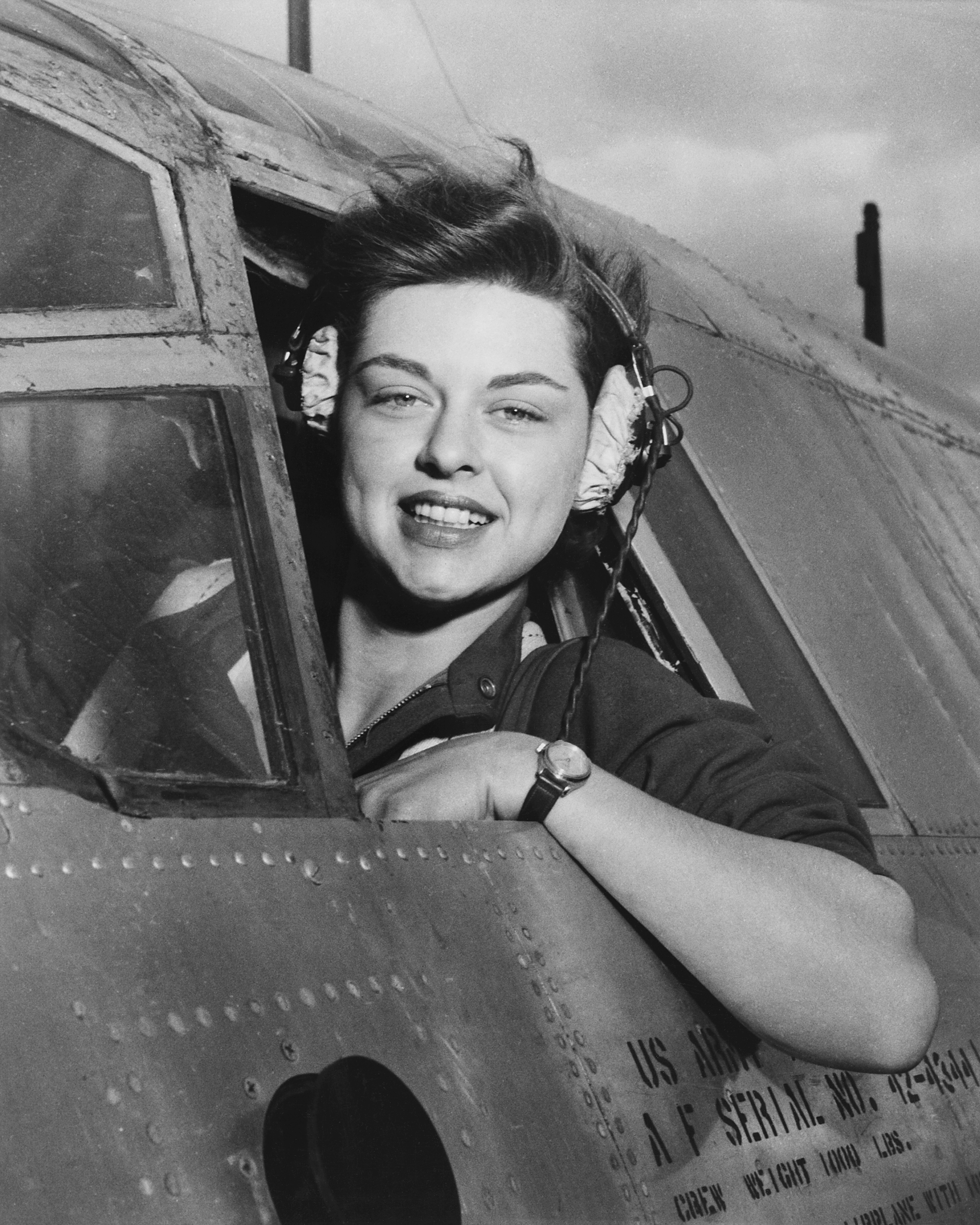
- Gardner in the pilot's seat of a Martin B-26 Marauder
- Born: 1921; Rockford, Illinois, US
- Died: December 22, 2011 (aged 90); New York City, US
- Occupation: Pilot
- Military career
- Allegiance: United States
- Branch: United States Army Air Corps

Elizabeth L. Gardner (1921 – December 22, 2011) was an American pilot during World War II who served as a member of the Women Airforce Service Pilots (WASP). She was one of the first American female military pilots and the subject of a well-known photograph, sitting in the pilot's seat of a Martin B-26 Marauder.

In 2009, the 300 living WASP pilots were awarded a Congressional Gold Medal through a unit citation. (Note: They were granted veteran's status in 1977, after a prolonged legal battle. They were also given the right to be buried in Arlington National Cemetery. Sculptor Don Everhart designed the medal, and it is on display at the Boeing Aviation Hangar at the Steven F. Udvar-Hazy Center in Chantilly, Virginia.)

== Early life and family ==
Gardner was born in Rockford, Illinois, in 1921. She graduated from Rockford High School in 1939. She was a mother and housewife before the war started. After she married, she took the last name Remba.

== Military career ==
Upon enlisting as a WASP member, Gardner "had two days of training under Lieutenant Col. Paul Tibbets, who later commanded the B-29 that dropped the first atom bomb on Hiroshima". She was the subject of an often-reproduced historical photo when she was about 22; the original is held at the National Archives. (Note: The photo was taken at Harlingen Army Air Field.) The photograph became emblematic of the place of women in the service of their country.

Gardner flew Martin B-26 Marauder medium bombers, including the AT-23 trainer version of the bomber. One of her stations was in Dodge City, Kansas. She was trained as a test pilot and flight instructor, and she also flew aircraft that towed aerial targets.

After years of fighting for recognition of their military service, WASP members were recognized with the Congressional Gold Medal in 2009.

== Later life and legacy ==
In December 1944, the government disbanded WASP, and Gardner returned to the private sector. She was a commercial pilot after World War II, flying for Piper Aircraft Corporation in Pennsylvania. In that capacity, she became involved in public relations, using her piloting skills to ferry Piper customers, meeting with the Department of Defense, and writing all of William T. Piper's speeches.

Gardner worked as a test pilot after the war, including for General Textile Mills, which was working on an aircraft parachute that was intended to safely land aircraft that became disabled in flight. She participated in at least two tests with the device in December 1945, both of which forced her to bail out of the aircraft when the parachute became tangled in the test aircraft. During the second incident, the aircraft entered a dive when its elevators were jammed by the parachute; Gardner escaped from the cockpit, but she was only 500 ft (150 m) from the ground when her own parachute opened.

She died in New York on December 22, 2011. Rockford, Illinois held a mural festival downtown in 2019 and included a mural by Ohio artists Jenny Roesel Ustick and Atalie Gagnet based on Gardner's time as a WASP.
