= Horia Agarici =

Romanian aviator (1911–1982)

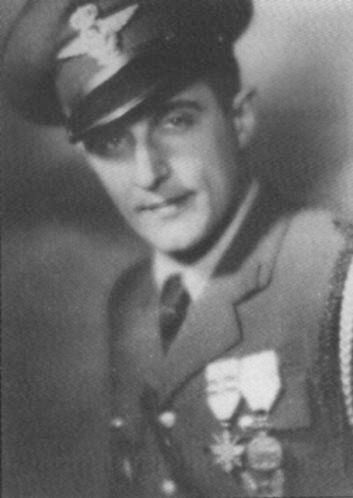
- Born: 11 May 1911; Lausanne, Switzerland
- Died: 13 July 1982 (aged 71); Constanța, Socialist Republic of Romania
- Burial place: Central Cemetery, Constanța
- Military career
- Allegiance: Kingdom of Romania
- Branch: Royal Romanian Air Force
- Service years: 1934–1945
- Rank: Captain
- Nickname: Savior of Constanța
- Unit: 7th Fighter Group
- Commands: 52nd Fighter Squadron; 58th Fighter Squadron
- Conflicts: World War II; Raid on Constanța; Eastern Front
- Awards: Aeronautical Virtue Medal; Order of the Crown; Iron Cross

Horia Agarici (Romanian pronunciation: [ˈhori.a aɡaˈrit͡ʃʲ]; April 6, 1911 – July 13, 1982) was a Romanian aviator and World War II flying ace.

== Early life ==
Agarici was born in Lausanne, Switzerland, in the family of Constantin and Valeria, née Russo (Alecu Russo was a relative of hers). Valeria died in 1914, when Horia was 2 years old. The death of his mother and the remarriage of Constantin to Sofia Cerna, the daughter of a Bucharest lawyer, alienated Horia from his father.

Agarici lived much of his youth in Iași, Brașov, and Bucharest, where he attended the primary and secondary schools. In 1929 he enrolled at the Polytechnical School in Timișoara; however, he dropped out for financial reasons (which also plunged him into depression), and in 1930 he enrolled instead at the Military Flying School in Bucharest.

== Military career ==
For health reasons, he wasn't able to start his military training until 1931. Agarici didn't adapt easily to the military lifestyle: his military appearance looked a bit unkempt, he learned only what he considered interesting, and he openly voiced his disagreements with his superiors. Traian Stătescu, a colleague of his, described Agarici in his memoirs as "a well-mannered guy, whose upbringing could not be compared to any of ours, and for which he was laughed at; he had had a governess and spoke French perfectly. Horia Agarici minded his own business [..] and he didn't react to mockery and the pranks performed by his colleagues. He was covered in all kinds of insults, one worse than the other. He was impassive. He didn't react and that annoyed the troublemakers terribly".

Agarici graduated from the flying school on 8 June 1933, with the rank of second lieutenant, and was assigned to the Balloon Squadron in Pantelimon, Bucharest. He later reminisced that "I lived that one-year tour of duty at the Balloon Squadron in a world of mine, isolated from the military, reading and leading a young man's life in Bucharest. At the airbase we performed some studies for adapting the autogyro and the helicopter to the balloons".

In the autumn of 1934 he received the pilot license at the Flying School in Tecuci, and he was subsequently assigned to the Combat Flotilla (a common fighter and bomber wing) based at Pipera Airport, near Bucharest. On 1 April 1937 the Combat Flotilla was split into the 1st Fighter Flotilla (based at Pipera) and the 1st Bomber Flotilla (which was relocated to Brașov). Originally assigned to the Bomber Flotilla, Second Lieutenant Agarici transferred to the 1st Fighter Flotilla, where he finalized his specialty training on 6 June 1937 and was promoted to lieutenant.

== World War II ==
The 1st Fighter Flotilla was initially equipped with older Polish airplanes, PZL P.11 and PZL P.24. However, in early 1940 the Fighter Flotilla received 12 Hawker Hurricane fighter aircraft from the United Kingdom, to the delight of Lieutenant Agarici, who immediately proceeded to study the technical manuals and later joined their assembly operations.

In January 1941, before Romania's entry in World War II on the side of Nazi Germany, Agarici was reassigned to the 53rd Fighter Squadron based at the Mamaia airfield in Northern Dobruja, which was tasked with defending the coastline, the port and city of Constanța, and the railroad to Bucharest. The squadron was equipped with the Hawker Hurricanes delivered the year before, because their engines were deemed more reliable than those of the German Heinkel He 112 and Messerschmitt Bf 109 (which were issued to other fighter squadrons, based inland), and therefore considered more suitable for air combat at sea.

On 22 June 1941, the day Operation Barbarossa was launched, the 53rd Fighter Squadron flew on a bomber escort mission to Buzău. Agarici had to stay behind at the Mamaia base because his airplane was under repair. At the base there was only another available Hawker Hurricane, also grounded and under repair due to engine overheating.

Agarici became famous a day later, on 23 June 1941, after a first wave of Soviet bombers had attacked the port of Constanța. When the second wave of Ilyushin DB-3's approached, he was allowed to fly the second Hawker Hurricane (the one having engine overheating problems) into action against the Soviet bombers. Within a minute he gunned down three enemy aircraft, out of which two could safely land (and have their crews taken prisoner) and the third crashed into the Black Sea, 10 kilometres (6.2 miles) off Mamaia. Afterwards the engine of the Hawker Hurricane started to overheat, causing Agarici to break off his attack and land at the base.

Agarici thus became the first Romanian aviator who managed to shoot down three enemy aircraft in a single battle. His feat was used for propaganda purposes by the Ion Antonescu regime and became soon the theme of a popular song, composed by Gherase Dendrino, whose lyrics, written by Păstorel Teodoreanu, started with the following two lines: "He went out hunting, Agarici,/ He went out hunting Bolsheviks".

By mid-1941, he claimed two more kills, and won ace status. In 1942, Agarici was assigned the command of the 52nd Flying Squadron in Mamaia, which was meant to defend Axis supply routes in the Black Sea. The next year, he was commander of the 7th Fighter Group on the Eastern Front, and chief of the operations' bureau.

For his actions, he was awarded the Aeronautical Virtue Medal, 3rd class, the Order of the Crown, Knight rank, and the German Iron Cross, and was promoted to captain.

During the United States Army Air Forces raid on Bucharest in early 1944, he was in command of the 58th Fighter Squadron, which engaged the Fifteenth Air Force. During the confrontation, Agarici's plane was hit, and he had to make a forced landing, immediately after his last kill.

== After World War II ==
After the Communist takeover, Agarici was dismissed from the Air Force. Between 1953 and 1955 he was deported to the village Neatârnarea in Tulcea County. In 1955 he was stripped of his rank, sentenced to 25 years hard labor, and imprisoned at the notorious Aiud Prison. In 1964 he was released and his rank of Captain was reinstated in 1965.

He died in 1982 and was buried with military honors in Constanța's Central Cemetery.

In 1994, a street in Constanța was named after him (although incorrectly at first); a street in Năvodari also bears his name.

== See also ==
- Bombing of Romania in World War II
- List of World War II flying aces from Romania
- Alexandru Șerbănescu
- Constantin Cantacuzino
- Romanian Air Force

== Bibliography ==
- Bichir, Florian (2020). Horai Agarici, vânătorul de bolșevici: viața unui aviator în Arhivele Securității (in Romanian). București: Editura Militară. ISBN 978-973-32-1187-7. OCLC 1225886476.
- Bernád, Dénes (2003). Rumanian Aces of World War 2. John A. Weal. Botley, Oxfordshire: Osprey Publishing. p. 16. ISBN 1-84176-535-X. OCLC 51992627.
- Crăciunoiu, Cristian (March 2000). "L'impact d'une chanson" [Impact of a Song]. Avions: Toute l'aéronautique et son histoire (in French) (84): 55–59. ISSN 1243-8650.
- Karlenko, Dmitrii (August 2000). "Courrier des Lecteurs" [Readers' Letters]. Avions: Toute l'Aéronautique et son histoire (in French) (89): 2. ISSN 1243-8650.
