= Grupul 7 Vânătoare =

7th Fighter Group
- Grupul 7 Vânătoare
- Bf 109E fighters used by the 7th Fighter Group in 1942
- Active: 1 June 1940 – August 1944
- Country: Romania
- Branch: Royal Romanian Air Force
- Type: Group
- Role: Fighter
- Equipment: Hawker Hurricane; Messerschmitt Bf 109E; Messerschmitt Bf 109G; IAR 81C
- Engagements: Second World War: Eastern Front; Siege of Odessa; Battle of Stalingrad; Donbas strategic offensive (July & August 1943); First Jassy–Kishinev offensive; Second Jassy–Kishinev offensive; Operation Margarethe II; Western Allied campaign in Romania

Commanders
- Notable commanders: Alexandru Șerbănescu

Grupul 7 Vânătoare ("7th Fighter Group" in English) was an elite fighter group in the Royal Romanian Air Force (ARR) formed on 1 June 1940 at the Pipera airfield, near Bucharest. It fought in Romania's campaign on the Eastern Front as far as Stalingrad in 1942, and defended the country against Allied air raids in 1944. After King Michael's Coup, the group was merged with Grupul 9 Vânătoare into what was called Grupul 7/9 Vânătoare.

== History ==
Bf 109 with the Donald Duck emblem used by the 7th Group in 1941-1942

Grupul 7 Vânătoare was formed on 1 June 1940 within the 1st Fighter Flotilla (Flotila 1 Vânătoare). It had two fighter squadrons: the 57th and the 53rd, and was based at the Pipera Airport. Equipped with Bf 109Es and Hawker Hurricanes, the 7th Group was the best-equipped fighter unit of the Royal Romanian Air Force at that time. After the German military mission arrived in Romania, Grupul 7 began training with the Luftwaffe I./JG 28. With the arrival of more Bf 109s ordered from Germany, two new squadrons were established: the 56th and the 58th, while the 53rd Squadron was reassigned to Grupul 5 Vânătoare.

After finishing training, the group was moved to Râmnicu Sărat on 15 June 1941, then to Bârlad on 21 June, shortly before the start of Operation Barbarossa. The first mission was flown on the starting day of the invasion with Bf 109s escorting Heinkel He 111 bombers of Grupul 5 Bombardament. In the same mission, the escorting Bf 109s strafed a Soviet airfield in Bessarabia and destroyed several fighters on the ground.

Between June and September, the 7th Group flew numerous sorties, downing multiple Soviet aircraft, mostly Polikarpov I-16s. On 21 August, during the ongoing siege of Odessa, Grupul 7 clashed with Soviet Yak-1s and Il-2s. Led by Lieutenant commander Alexandru Popișteanu, the Romanian Bf 109s, joined by an Italian Macchi C.200, attacked the Soviet aircraft. In the dogfight, Popișteanu's aircraft was hit and crashed while the pilot attempted to land. Six Yaks were shot down in the engagement. Popișteanu was posthumously decorated with the Order of Michael the Brave by King Michael I, who visited the group. Captain Commander Mihail Romanescu, the commander of the 1st Fighter Flotilla, took personal command of the group to boost morale after the loss of commander Popișteanu.

The 1941 campaign of Grupul 7 Vânătoare ended on 16 October after the fall of Odessa. A total of one probable and 62 confirmed victories were achieved, with seven more aircraft destroyed on the ground. In turn, the 7th Group lost six aircraft.

=== Stalingrad-Karpovka ===
After completing training and refit at Pipera in August 1942, the group was sent to the front at Stalingrad under the command of Grigore Crihană, arriving at Tuzov airfield near Golubinskaya on 8 September. Later, the group was further moved to the Karpovka airfield. Its mission was providing fighter cover for the Romanian Third Army and escorting bombers in their attacks on Stalingrad.

Soviet fighters rarely passed over the Volga, as such air combat was limited. On 19 September, a patrol of Bf 109s engaged 16 Yak fighters while escorting He 111s and Ju 88s over Stalingrad, downing one enemy fighter. Soviet Pe-2s also began attacking the 7th Group's air base during the same month, and several were shot down. For their successful escort missions, the Romanian fighters were mentioned by General Martin Fiebig, commander of the German 8th Air Corps.

After the start of Operation Uranus, the 7th Fighter Group found itself trapped in the Stalingrad pocket. Several reconnaissance flights were carried out shortly after, and Soviet tanks were discovered a few kilometers south of the air base on 21 September. Ioan Dicezare was then sent to report to the Romanian Air Combat Group command from Tatsinskaya while the defenses of the airfield were organized and an evacuation was planned. Lieutenant Alexandru Șerbănescu organized the airfield's defense, using two anti-aircraft batteries and some of the Group's Bf 109s placed in a direct fire position. Over the course of the night of 22 November, two Soviet assaults were held off and the evacuation began early in the morning of 23 November. Under bombardment from Soviet T-34s, Romanian pilots left the airfield, some carrying one or two mechanics on board their fighters. Five aircraft were destroyed in the evacuation; 7 more unserviceable ones were abandoned. Eight pilots reached Tatsinskaya. Later, more personnel from Karpovka was evacuated by Ju 52s, assisted by pilots of Grupul 7.

After evacuating Karpovka, the remaining fighters of Grupul 7 joined several He 111s from Grupul 5 Bombardament into a Mixed Group. They continued to fly various missions into early 1943, with Bf 109s even strafing a column of Soviet troops near Zaporozhye and stopping their attack, earning a citation for their action. At the end of February, the group returned to Romania.

=== 1943 campaign ===
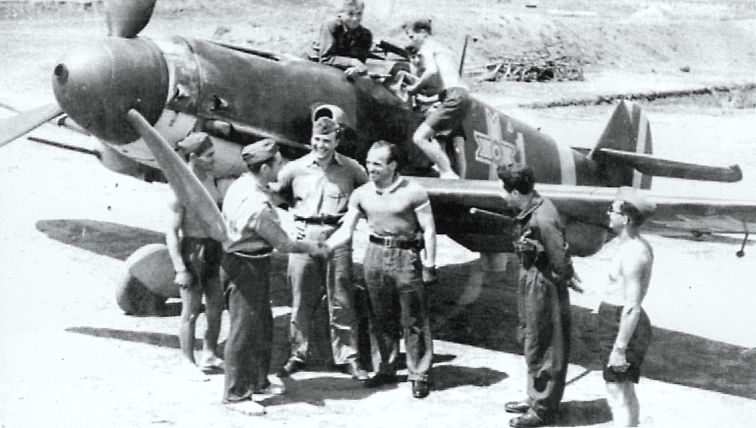
Captain Șerbănescu congratulating ground crews after returning from a sortie (Note: The aircraft in the image is Bf 109G-2/R6 "White 1" flown by Șerbănescu in 1943)

On 10 March 1943, Grupul 7 converted to the Bf 109G and was transferred to the German Jagdgeschwader 3, forming the Deutsch-Königlich Rumänischen Jagdverband (German-Royal Romanian Fighter Unit), under the command of Eberhard von Boremski. They began flying combat missions on 29 March, with Captain Șerbănescu taking over command of the 7th Group. On 10 April, a formation of Romanian Bf 109s led by von Boremski strafed a Soviet airfield, destroying five Pe-2s on the ground. Later, they moved to the Kramatorskaya airfield and by the end of April, four Soviet aircraft were shot down, and 1.6 tons of bombs were dropped.

In May 1943, the collaboration with JG 3 ended, with the group claiming 28 victories in 583 sorties. On 5 June, the group took part in an aerial display at Kirovograd in the presence of Marshal Ion Antonescu and Field Marshal Wolfram von Richthofen, commander of Luftflotte 4. Afterwards, it was assigned to the Romanian 1st Air Corps.

Over the following months, the group flew bomber escort and free-hunting missions in the Mius sector. By the end of September, it registered around 126 victories, which included Il-2s, Pe-2s, LaGGs, La-5s, Yak-1s and Spitfires, while losing around 14 airplanes. In total, it had conducted nearly 3000 sorties, earning praise from the German 4th Air Corps. Five pilots of the Group were decorated with the Order of Michael the Brave. On 27 July, Captian Constantin Cantacuzino claimed a Yak-1, whose pilot was later identified as the Soviet flying ace Nikolay Fedorovich Khimushin.

In October, four losses were registered against Soviet P-39 Airacobras while one P-39 was shot down. The 1943 campaign of the 7th Fighter Group ended on 23 October, with Grupul 9 Vânătoare replacing the exhausted group at the front line.

=== Defense of the country ===
In early 1944, the 7th Group had two squadrons, the 56th and the 58th. Due to a lack of airplanes and pilots, IAR 81Cs and personnel from the Galați Fighter School joined. The 43rd Fighter Squadron also joined the group. On 4 April, during the air raid on Bucharest carried out by the USAAF, the 7th Group scrambled 11 IARs and 7 Bf 109s, and claimed five B-24 bombers, of which one was confirmed.

Shortly after, the 53rd Fighter Squadron was reintegrated into the 7th Group, replacing the 43rd Squadron. On 5 and 15 April, the Group engaged in two more American air raids, shooting down four bombers. On 19 April, Grupul 7 was sent to the front in Moldavia with the 57th and the 53rd squadrons, while the 58th remained at Pipera. On 22 April, they started to fly missions in the Târgu Frumos area. With the start of the Second Battle of Târgu Frumos, the number of missions intensified. The last mission at the front was on 30 May, with 22 victories claimed, of which 4 unconfirmed.

The 58th Fighter Squadron returned to the group and participated in two air raids, shooting down five P-38s on 10 June. On 19 June, Luftflotte 4 started the code-named "Sternflug" plan which directed six German fighter groups and the Romanian 7th and 9th Groups against the Americans. By the end of July, the 7th Group could only muster 10 aircraft, and the last mission against the USAAF was flown on 18 August. Between June and August, the group had lost 13 aircraft and claimed 10 victories.

A few days before King Michael's Coup on 23 August, Grupul 7 was moved to Roman to aid against the Soviet Second Jassy–Kishinev offensive. On 24 August, after the coup, the group was called to Popești-Leordeni and joined the 9th Group in shooting down German bombers that were attacking the capital. In these last engagements, the 7th Group claimed seven German aircraft. At the end of August, Grupul 7 was merged into Grupul 9 to form Grupul 7/9 Vânătoare and participate in further battles.

== Organization 1941–1944 ==
The 7th Fighter Group had the following squadrons between 1941 and 1944:

- 56th Fighter Squadron
- 57th Fighter Squadron
- 58th Fighter Squadron
- 43rd Fighter Squadron (non-permanent)
- 53rd Fighter Squadron (non-permanent)

== Bibliography ==
- Bernád, Dénes (20 June 2003). Rumanian Aces of World War 2. Osprey Publishing. ISBN 978-1-84176-535-8.
- Moroșanu, Teodor Liviu; Melinte, Dan Alexandru (2010). Romanian Fighter Colors 1941-1945. MMP Books. ISBN 978-83-89450-90-6.
- Perpits, Mark (2023). "Tudor Greceanu, un cavaler al înălțimilor. Schița biografică a unui zburător - obiecte ale pilotului de vânătoare, aflate în patrimoniul Muzeului Național de Istorie a României" (PDF). Cercetări numismatice (in Romanian). XXIX. Bucharest.
