= 1st Air Corps (Romania) =

1st Romanian Air Corps
- Corpul 1 Aerian Român
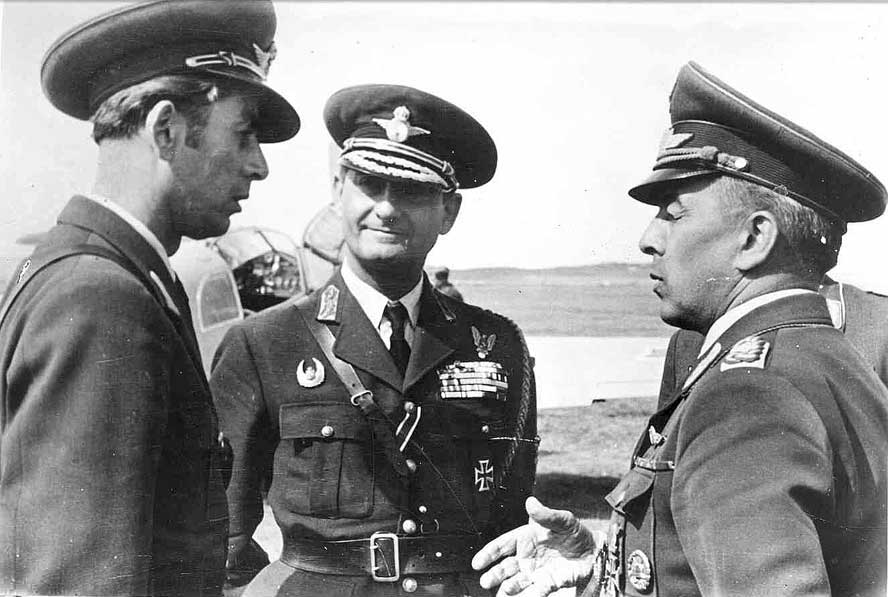
- Emanoil Ionescu (center), commander of the Romanian 1st Air Corps, with Karl Angerstein (right), commander of the German 1st Air Corps
- Active: 1943–1945
- Country: Romania
- Branch: Royal Romanian Air Force
- Size: Corps
- Engagements: Eastern Front

Commanders
- Notable commanders: General Emanoil Ionescu

Corpul 1 Aerian (1st Air Corps), was formed on 1 January 1943 from Gruparea Aerienă de Luptă (Air Combat Group - GAL). It was the only large Romanian air unit on the Eastern Front. After Romania changed sides in August 1944, the 1st Air Corps provided air support to the Romanian and Soviet armies in Transylvania, Hungary, and Czechoslovakia.

== History ==
=== Gruparea Aerienă de Luptă ===
Gruparea Aerienă de Luptă (GAL), was constituted in mid-June 1941 as the main Royal Romanian Air Force (ARR) unit to participate in the upcoming Operation Barbarossa. Subordinated to the GAL were the 1st Fighter Flotilla with the 5th and 7th Fighter Groups, 2nd Fighter Flotilla with the 8th Fighter Group, as well as the 1st Bombardment Flotilla with the 1st, 4th, and 5th Groups, the 2nd Bombardment Flotilla with the 2nd and 6th Groups, and the 2nd Guard Aviation Flotilla with the 1st and 2nd Guard Groups. During the campaign, it operated around 253 combat aircraft.

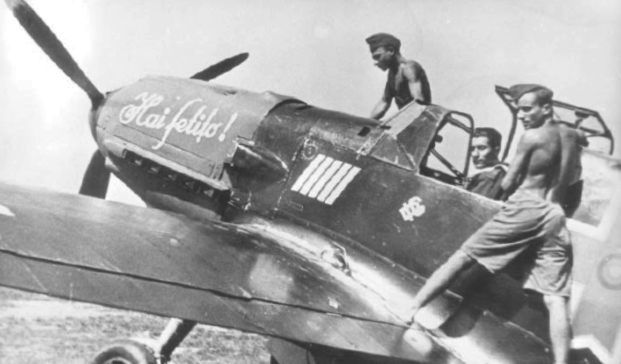
Bf 109E of the 7th Fighter Group in 1942

Participating in the battles for Bessarabia and the Siege of Odessa, the GAL pilots flew in over 800 missions with over 250 aircraft claimed in battle for the loss of 16 fighter aircraft. After the 1941 campaign, GAL was disbanded and then re-established on 6 September 1942 under the command of General Ermil Gheorghiu. After the 6 October meeting between General Gheorghiu and Field Marshal Wolfram von Richthofen, it was established that GAL was to collaborate closely with Luftwaffe units of Luftflotte 4 and its Fighter Groups (6th, 7th, and 9th) were to escort the German bombers attacking Stalingrad.

From the airfields of Tatsinskaya and Morozovskaya, the GAL units supported the 6th German and Third Romanian armies with bombing, reconnaissance and fighter cover missions during the Battle of Stalingrad. After the evacuation of the Tatsinskaya airfield, the GAL units began moving back to the country. First redeploying to Novocherkassk on 23 December 1942.

On 1 January 1943, GAL was reorganized as Corpul 1 Aerian (1st Air Corps).

=== Corpul 1 Aerian ===
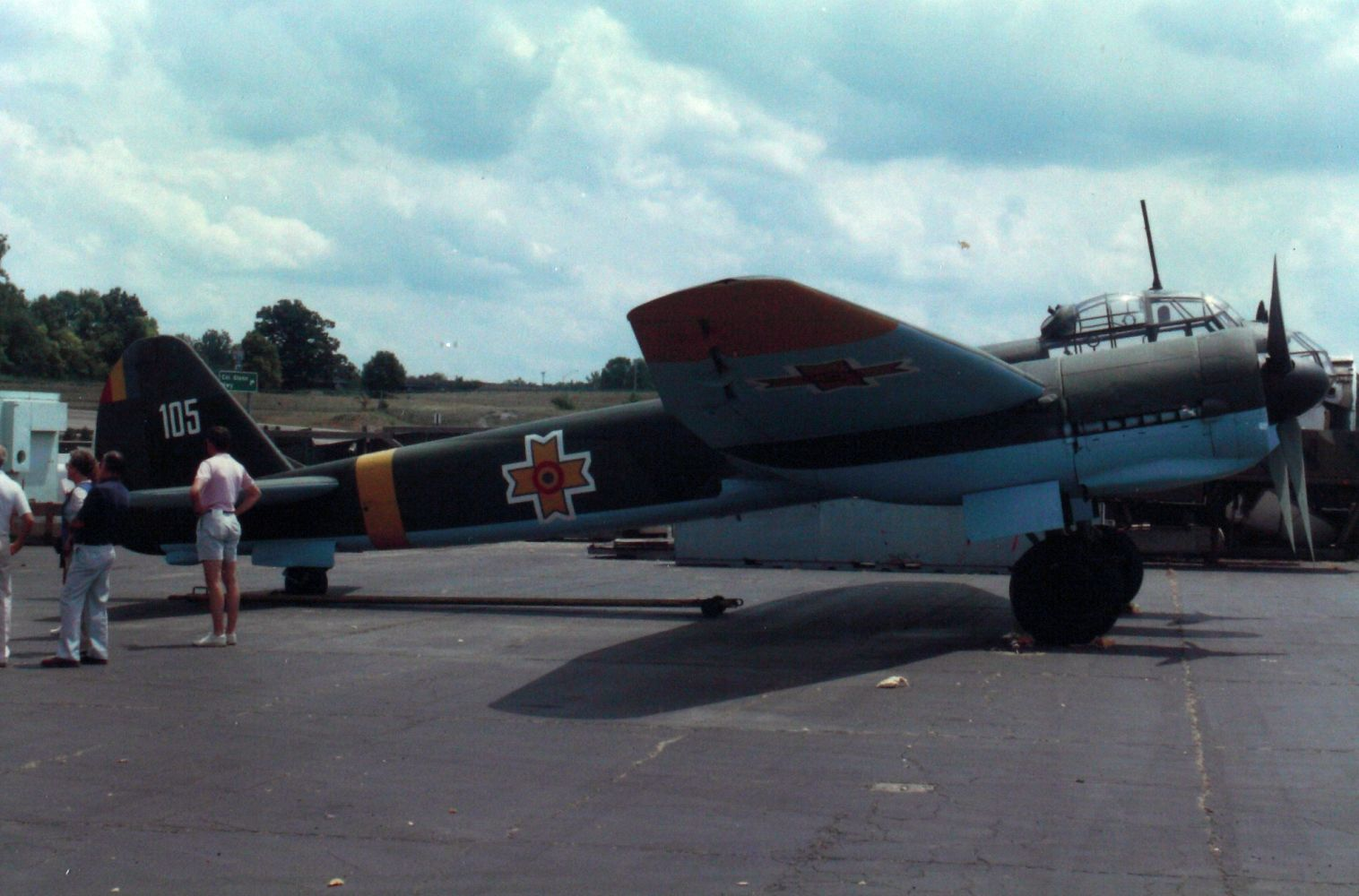
Ju 88D-1 of the 2nd Long Range Reconnaissance Squadron

After the formation of the Air Corps, its units continued retreating to Melitopol, then to Odessa, Tiraspol, and Mykolaiv where the losses suffered at Stalingrad were replenished. At this time, fighter units of Grupul 7 Vânătoare began converting to the Bf 109G, with several pilots being transferred to Jagdgeschwader 3 for training. Bombardment units like Grupul 5 and Grupul 6 began converting to the Ju 88 bombers, while Grupul 3 converted to Ju 87 dive bombers. Grupul 8 was converted from a fighter unit to an attack aircraft unit equipped with the Hs 129, and all units of the Air Corps were standardized to 12 aircraft per squadron, with a further nine aircraft in reserve for each group. In June, Escadrila 2 Recunoaștere Îndepărtată converted from the Do 17M to the Ju 88D-1 reconnaissance airplanes. Grupul 9 began transitioning from the IAR 80 to the Bf 109G in August, however, due to attrition suffered by Grupul 7 the conversion process was delayed.

The Air Corps became operational again on 5 June 1943. A grand parade attended by King Michael, Marshal Ion Antonescu, and other high-ranking Luftwaffe officers was staged at Kirovgrad to mark this event. On 16 June, the Air Corps moved its headquarters to Mariupol and began flying combat missions in support of the Axis forces on the southern part of the Eastern Front. General Emanoil Ionescu was appointed as the new commander of the Air Corps on 28 September after General Gheorghiu was recalled to the general staff of the Undersecretary of State for the Air.

In the autumn and winter of 1943, the bombardment units of the Air Corps supported the German and Romanian units on the Kuban bridgehead, Mius line, and in Crimea. The 8th Assault Squadron also supported the German 1st Panzer Army and Army Group A in their operations around Donets and Krivoy Rog, while the 2nd Long Range Reconnaissance Squadron carried out extensive reconnaissance missions of Soviet lines and airfields.

By early 1944, the strength of the 1st Air Corps was reduced due to losses suffered in battle. It also was forced to retreat due to the Soviet advance. In April, the Corps fell back to Bessarabia. Due to the nature of the air combat missions, the Romanian Air Force staff determined that a further two Air Corps should be established. However, due to the lack of time and resources, only one Corps was established. The so called Corpul 3 Aerian (3rd Air Corps) was formed and replaced the exhausted Corpul 1 on the frontline in the summer of 1944.

==== Anti-Axis campaign ====
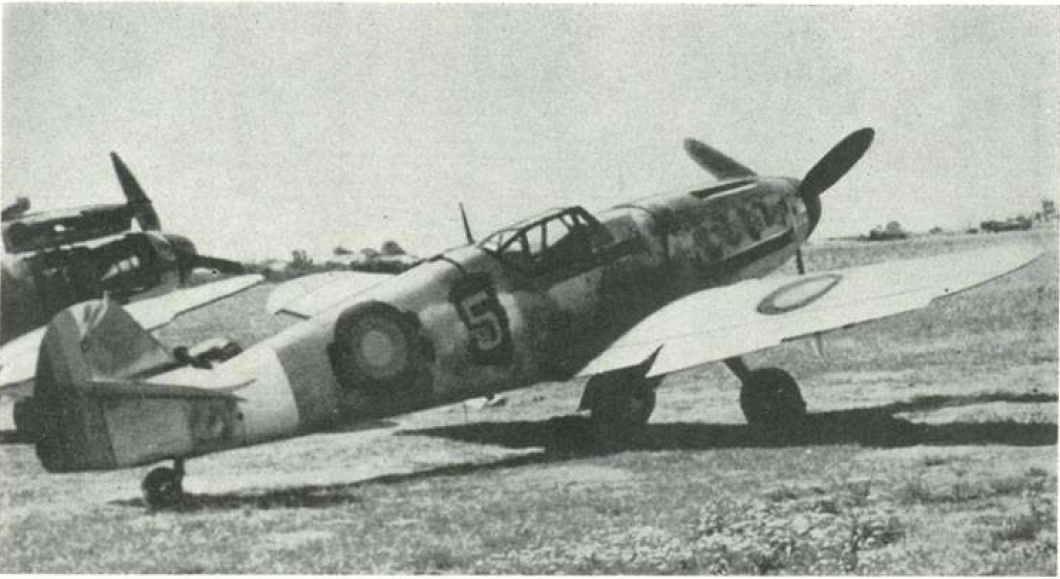
A Romanian Bf 109G-6 in late 1944

By 23 August, both Air Corps were deployed inside the country to defend its territory. Between 26 and 27 August, the 3rd Air Corps fought against German units in the Slobozia region, while the 1st Air Corps fought in the Buzău region. On 25 October 1944, the 3rd Air Corps was merged with the 3rd Air Region, the 1st Air Corps remaining the only large air unit on the front.

The Air Corps was transferred to the command of the Soviet 5th Air Army on 9 September and began flying missions in support of the Romanian Fourth and First armies, as well as of the Soviet 6th Guards Tank Army, 27th, and 28th armies on the Transylvanian front. From 25 October, Corpul 1 Aerian was composed of 14 squadrons with around 176 aircraft. On 14 November, the headquarters of the Air Corps were moved to Turkeve in Hungary while other units were moved to nearby airfields.

By late 1944, encounters with German or Hungarian aircraft diminished because of their fuel shortages, and missions were mainly executed in support of ground operations. From January 1945, the headquarters were located on the Miskolc Airfield. An important mission carried out by Ju 87 and Ju 88 bombers of the Air Corps happened on 13 January 1945 during the Siege of Budapest, when the bombers were instructed to attack the Budapest Chain Bridge and the Erzsébet Bridge.

The Air Corps units were strengthened in preparation for the final offensive in Czechoslovakia in February 1945. By the time of the Prague offensive, there were about 240 aircraft organized in 20 squadrons. The operations ended on 18 May, when the Germans were considered completely defeated. Between 23 August 1944 and 12 May 1945, the 1st Air Corps completed some 4306 missions and registered some 11385 flight hours. In the Western campaign, around 176 Axis aircraft were destroyed by aircraft or AA units of the 1st Air Corps.

In the summer of 1945, aircraft of Corpul 1 Aerian participated in air shows held in Bratislava and Wiener Neustadt. Between July and August, the Air Corps units returned to Romania.

== Commanders ==
- Ermil Gheorghiu, 1 January 1943 – 28 September 1943
- Emanoil Ionescu, 28 September 1943 – 10 March 1945
- Traian Burduloiu, 10 March 1945 – 1 September 1945

== Organization ==
=== Late 1942 – Early 1943 ===
Subordinated to Luftflotte 4 with the following units:

- Flotila 2 Vânătoare
  - Grupul 6 Vânătoare (IAR 80)
  - Grupul 7 Vânătoare (Bf 109E)
  - Grupul 8 Vânătoare (IAR 80)
- Flotila 2 Bombardament
  - Grupul 1 Bombardament (SM 79)
  - Grupul 3 Bombardament (IAR 39, Do 17, PZL.23)
  - Grupul 5 Bombardament (He 111)
  - Grupul Aero Transport (Ju 52, Fi 156)
- Brigada 4 Artilerie Antiaeriană

=== June 1943 ===
Subordinated to Luftflotte 4 with the following units:

- Flotila 1 Vânătoare
  - Grupul 7 Vânătoare (Bf 109G)
    - Escadrila 56 Vânătoare
    - Escadrila 57 Vânătoare
    - Escadrila 58 Vânătoare
  - Grupul 9 Vânătoare (IAR 80A)
    - Escadrila 43 Vânătoare
    - Escadrila 46 Vânătoare
    - Escadrila 48 Vânătoare
  - Grupul 8 Asalt (Hs 129B)
    - Escadrila 41 Asalt
    - Escadrila 42 Asalt
    - Escadrila 60 Asalt
- Flotila 3 Bombardament
  - Grupul 3 Bombardament Picaj (Ju 87)
    - Escadrila 73 Picaj
    - Escadrila 81 Picaj
    - Escadrila 85 Picaj
  - Grupul 5 Bombardament (Ju 88A-4)
    - Escadrila 77 Bombardament
    - Escadrila 79 Bombardament
    - Escadrila 80 Bombardament
  - Grupul 6 Bombardament (Ju 88A-4)
    - Escadrila 74 Bombardament
    - Escadrila 86 Bombardament
    - Escadrila 87 Bombardament
- Escadrila 2 Recunoaștere Îndepărtată (Ju 88D-1)
- Escadrila 105 Transport Greu (Ju 52)
- Escadrila 115 Legătură (Fleet 10G)
- Escadrila 116 Legătură (Fleet 10G)
- Regimentul 5 Artilerie Antiaeriană

=== 4 September 1944 ===
Subordinated to the Soviet 5th Air Army with the following units:

- Grupul 2 Vânătoare
  - Escadrila 65 Vânătoare
  - Escadrila 66 Vânătoare
- Grupul 6 Vânătoare
  - Escadrila 59 Vânătoare
  - Escadrila 61 Vânătoare
  - Escadrila 62 Vânătoare
- Grupul 9 Vânătoare
  - Escadrila 47 Vânătoare
  - Escadrila 48 Vânătoare
  - Escadrila 56 Vânătoare
- Grupul 5 Bombardament
  - Escadrila 77 Bombardament
  - Escadrila 78 Bombardament
- Grupul 3 Bombardament Picaj
- Grupul 8 Asalt
  - Escadrila 41
  - Escadrila 42
  - Escadrila 60
- Grupul 1 Observație
- Grupul 2 Observație
- Escadrila 44 Vânătoare
- Escadrila 2 Recunoaștere
- Escadrila 114 Legătură
- Escadrila Aero Transport
- Regimentul 6 Artilerie Antiaeriană
  - Divizionul 17 Artilerie Antiaeriană
  - Divizionul 18 Artilerie Antiaeriană

=== 1 July 1945 ===
Subordinated to the Soviet 5th Air Army with the following units:

- Grupul 1 Vânătoare (Piešťany)
- Grupul 2 Vânătoare (Piešťany)
- Grupul 9 Vânătoare (Piešťany)
- Grupul 8 Asalt (Piešťany)
- Escadrila 2 Recunoaștere (Piešťany)
- Grupul 2 Observație (Trenčín)
  - Escadrila 13 Observație (Piešťany)
- Escadrila 113 Legătură (Miskolc)
- Escadrila 114 Legătură (Piešťany)
- Escadrila Mixtă Aero Transport (Piešťany)
- Divizionul 17 Artilerie Antiaeriană (Piešťany)
- Divizionul 18 Artilerie Antiaeriană (Trenčín, Miskolc)

== See also ==
- 1st Air Corps (Germany)

== Bibliography ==
- Avram, Valeriu (2023). "Ermil Gheorghiu, comandantul Aviației Române pe frontul Stalingradului". Historia (in Romanian). No. 253. ISSN 1582-7968.
- Axworthy, Mark (1995). Third Axis, Fourth Ally: Romanian Armed Forces in the European War, 1941–1945. London: Arms and Armour.
- Bernád, Dénes (20 June 2003). Rumanian Aces of World War 2. Osprey Publishing. ISBN 978-1-84176-535-8.
- Neagoe, Visarion (2011). "Artileria antiaeriană română în campania militară din anul 1942" (PDF). Buletinul Arhivelor Militare Române (in Romanian). No. 54. ISSN 1454-0924.
