= 58th Fighter Squadron (Romania) =

- Escadrila 58 Vânătoare
- Romanian F-16 at Câmpia Turzii in December 2025
- Active: 18 February 1941 – 1945; 22 May 2025 – present
- Country: Romania
- Branch: Romanian Air Force; Royal Romanian Air Force
- Type: Squadron
- Role: Fighter
- Size: 16 F-16AM/BM (current)
- Garrison/HQ: RoAF 57th Air Base (Baza 57 Aeriană), Mihail Kogălniceanu, Constanța County (Currently deployed at Câmpia Turzii)
- Nickname: Dacian Tigers
- Motto: VIRTUS ALIS VOLAT ("Virtue flies on wings")
- Equipment: World War II: Messerschmitt Bf 109E-3; Messerschmitt Bf 109G; IAR 81C; Present: F-16AM/BM MLU
- Engagements: Second World War: Eastern Front; Battle of Stalingrad; Mius offensive; Western Allied campaign in Romania

Commanders
- Notable commanders: Constantin Cantacuzino; Horia Agarici; Ioan Dicezare

Insignia
- 58th Fighter Squadron badge

The 58th Fighter Squadron (Romanian: Escadrila 58 Vânătoare) is a squadron of the Romanian Air Force assigned to the 57th Air Base. It currently operates the F-16AM/BM fighter aircraft and is temporarily based at the 71st Air Base from Câmpia Turzii. The squadron was initially established on 18 February 1941 as part of the 7th Fighter Group. It took part in the campaign on the Eastern Front and in defending Romania against the Allied air raids. It was disbanded circa 1945.

Since Romania started to receive the second batch of Norwegian F-16s in 2025, the squadron was reestablished, initially under the name of 571st Fighter Squadron (Escadrila 571 Vânătoare). In 2026, it was renamed to the 58th Fighter Squadron.

== History ==
=== World War II ===
The 58th Squadron was established on 18 February 1941 within Grupul 7 Vânătoare (7th Fighter Group), part of Flotila 1 Vânătoare (1st Fighter Flotilla), following the delivery of the last 39 Bf 109 fighters purchased from Germany. At the time of the squadron's establishment, the 7th Group was undergoing training at the Pipera airfield with the Luftwaffe I./JG 28.

Training was completed on 14 June 1941, and the group was declared action ready, in time for the start of Operation Barbarossa. Under the command of Captain Gheorghe Vasiliu, the 58th Fighter Squadron participated in the initial campaign, escorting bombers and supporting ground troops.

On 18 August, Escadrila 58 engaged a formation of eight Polikarpov I-16s while covering Romanian ground troops, downing four Soviet fighters before retreating after the arrival of six more I-16s. Adjutant (Adj.) Tiberiu Vinca further shot down a lone Soviet fighter, but had to perform a belly landing in the aftermath due to the damage received.

==== 1942-1943 ====
On 2 September 1941, the squadron lost its leader when Captain Vasiliu was declared missing in action. He was replaced at the command of the 58th Fighter Squadron by Captain Dan Scurtu. Following the end of the Romanian 1941 campaign after the fall of Odessa, the group with its three squadrons (56th, 57th, and 58th) returned to Pipera and restarted training until 31 July 1942. On 8 September, Grupul 7 was moved to the Stalingrad area at Tuzov airfield. It later moved to the Karpovka airfield.

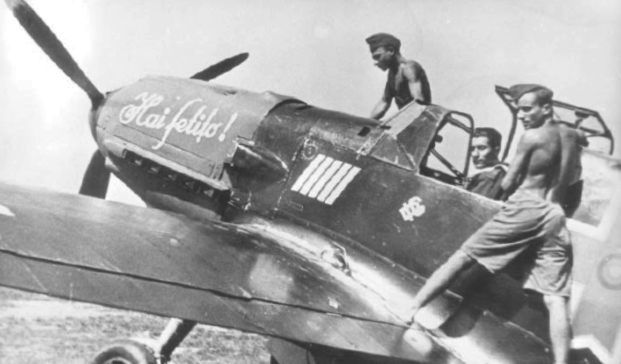
Bf 109E-3 flown by Ioan Dicezare at Stalingrad (Note: Aircraft is Bf 109E-3 no. 9/W.Nr. 2486 nicknamed Hai fetițo! ("C'mon girl!"). Dicezare's monogram ("DIC") is drawn under the cockpit, while the 5 stripes represent ground victory markings.)

The main missions flown over the next days were fighter cover for the Romanian Third Army and bomber escort missions in attacks on Stalingrad. Soviet Pe-2s began attacking the base of Grupul 7 shortly after it arrived at the front, and some were shot down. Soviet fighters rarely flew beyond the Volga, thus air combat was limited.

Following the start of Operation Uranus, the Karpovka airfield was surrounded. The squadrons of Grupul 7 carried out several reconnaissance missions in the aftermath. As Soviet tanks were discovered advancing towards the airfield, Ioan Dicezare was tasked with informing the commander of the Romanian Air Combat Group at Tatsinskaya. Karpovka airfield was then evacuated on 23 November. In the following days, Ju 52 transports accompanied by pilots from Grupul 7, mainly from Escadrila 58, continued to evacuate remaining personnel from Karpovka before the airfield was occupied.

After completing the evacuation, the 7th Group was moved to Ukraine and then returned to Romania in February. On 10 March 1943, it began converting to the Bf 109G and was transferred to the German Jagdgeschwader 3 for training, being moved to the Izyum sector. In June, the group was reintegrated into the Romanian 1st Air Corps at Kirovograd. On 5 May, Lieutenant Constantin Cantacuzino was assigned as commander of the 58th Fighter Squadron.

Over the next months, the group mostly flew escort missions in the Mius sector. On 27 July, Captain Cantacuzino shot down a Yak-1 fighter while escorting a German reconnaissance aircraft. The pilot shot down by Cantacuzino was later identified as the Soviet ace Nikolay Fedorovich Khimushin.

After changing airfields in September due to the Soviet advance, the 7th Group ended its 1943 campaign on 23 October, being replaced on the front by Grupul 9 Vânătoare. A day later, Captain Horia Agarici was named commander of Escadrila 58.

==== 1944 ====
In early 1944, Grupul 7 was based at Roșiorii de Vede with the 57th and the 58th squadrons. Due to a lack of pilots and aircraft, IAR 81C fighters and pilots from the Galați Fighter School joined the group. Later the group moved to Pipera. On 4 April, when the USAAF began bombing Bucharest, Ioan Dicezare was assigned as commander of the 58th Fighter Squadron. The group scrambled 11 IAR 81Cs and 7 Bf 109Gs in response and claimed five B-24 bombers (Note: Only one of which was confirmed.) for two Romanian fighters damaged.

In mid-April, Grupul 7 Vânătoare was transferred to the front in Moldavia with the 57th and the 53rd squadrons. Meanwhile, the 58th Fighter Squadron remained at Pipera. It was later reintegrated into the 7th Group and, on 10 June, IAR 81Cs and Bf 109s of the squadron engaged the P-38 Lightnings of the 82nd Fighter Group near Ploiești, claiming five P-38s.

A few days before the 23 August 1944 coup, Grupul 7 was moved to Roman after the Second Jassy–Kishinev offensive began. After flying some escort missions and switching airfields, the 7th Group was called to Popești-Leordeni on 24 August to defend the capital against the German attacks. On 25 August, the 7th and 9th Groups began engaging the German He 111 and Ju 87 bombers. In the battle over the capital, the pilots of Grupul 7 claimed seven German aircraft shot down.

After Grupul 7 was merged with Grupul 9 into Grupul 7/9 Vânătoare, the 58th Squadron did not participate in further battles and remained at Pipera.

=== Present day ===
The first F-16s of the squadron arrived at the 71st Air Base in Câmpia Turzii on 22 May 2025. The squadron, at that time named the 571st Fighter Squadron, will continue forming at this air base until the infrastructure works are ready at the 57th Air Base from Mihail Kogălniceanu, Constanța.

In 2026, it was announced that the 571st Fighter Squadron was renamed to the 58th Fighter Squadron (for 57+1), thus continuing the legacy of the elite Escadrila 58 Vânătoare.

== Bibliography ==
- Bernád, Dénes (20 June 2003). Rumanian Aces of World War 2. Osprey Publishing. ISBN 978-1-84176-535-8.
- Moroșanu, Teodor Liviu; Melinte, Dan Alexandru (2010). Romanian Fighter Colors 1941-1945. MMP Books. ISBN 978-83-89450-90-6.
