= List of World War II flying aces from Romania =

This is a list of fighter aces in World War II of the Royal Romanian Air Force. For other countries see List of World War II aces by country.

== Romanian WW2 victory system ==
In February 1944, the ARR (Aeronautica Regală Română) implemented a new and unique scoring system for victories. Victory points were awarded for confirmed and unconfirmed victories as well as for aircraft destroyed on the ground. Points were also awarded for shared victories. This system was applied to all claims prior to its introduction date and followed these rules:

- 3 victories for a 4 or 6 engine aircraft
- 2 victories for a 2 or 3 engine aircraft
- 1 victory for a single engine aircraft

== List of aces ==
The following list contains all pilots who scored 5 victories by the 1944 standard, also mentioning their number of aircraft shot down including shares and unconfirmed victories: (Note: This list might not be perfect.)

Name	Victories	ARR victories	Notes
Constantin "Bâzu" Cantacuzino	53 + 1^{*}	69	Top scoring Romanian ace 11 unconfirmed
Alexandru Șerbănescu	52	55	Top scoring Romanian ace before Romania left the Axis; 8 unconfirmed
Ion Milu	37 + 1^{*}	52	4 unconfirmed
Dan Vizanty	15 + 1^{*}	43	
Constantin Rosariu	20	33	2 unconfirmed
Cristea Chirvăsuță	22	31	4 unconfirmed
Ioan Maga	20	29	5 unconfirmed
Ion Mucenica	23 + 1^{*}	27	2 unconfirmed
Vasile Gavriliu	20 + 1^{*}	27	2 unconfirmed
Tudor Greceanu	24	24	5 unconfirmed
Constantin Lungulescu	19 + 1^{*}	24	2 unconfirmed
Ioan Dicezare	19	23+	3 unconfirmed
Dumitru Ilie	14	22	3 unconfirmed
Ioan Mălăcescu	19	21	3 unconfirmed
Gheorghe Popescu-Ciocănel	14	19	1 unconfirmed
Dan Scurtu	14	19	3 unconfirmed
Teodor Zăbavă	17 + 1^{*}	18	3 unconfirmed
Andrei Rădulescu	14	18	4 unconfirmed
Tiberiu Vinca	16 + 1^{*}	17	3 unconfirmed
Traian Dârjan	11 + 1^{*}	17	1 unconfirmed
Mihai Bulat	4 + 5^{*}	17	
Ioan Nicola	6 + 4^{*}	16	
Ion Dobran	13	15	3 unconfirmed
Mihai Mihordea	9 + 1^{*}	15	1 unconfirmed
Ștefan Dumitrescu	8	15	2 unconfirmed
Aurel Tifrea	6	15	1 unconfirmed
Gheorghe Stănică	5	15	2 unconfirmed
Eugen Fulga	3 + 7^{*}	15	1 unconfirmed
Ernst Stengl	12	14	Luftwaffe liaison officer Also served with German units; destroyed 17 aircraft in total
Eugen Camencianu	10	14	3 unconfirmed
Costică P. Popescu	8	14	1 unconfirmed
Petre Cojocaru	4 + 1^{*}	14	1 unconfirmed
Dumitru Chera	4 + 1^{*}	13	
Iosif Moraru	12	13	4 unconfirmed
Ioan Micu	11 + 1^{*}	13	1 unconfirmed
Mircea Dumitrescu	7 + 3^{*}	13	2 unconfirmed
Horia Agarici	8	13	2 unconfirmed
Lucian Toma	7	13	
Hariton Dușescu	11	12	1 unconfirmed
Gheorghe Țuțuianu	10	12	2 unconfirmed
Ion Galea	7	12	2 unconfirmed
Gheorghe Cristea	3 + 1^{*}	12	
Ioan Bârlădeanu	3 + 1^{*}	12	1 unconfirmed
Nicolae Polizu-Micșunești	10	11	
Ștefan Greceanu	10	11	3 unconfirmed
Ioan Panaite	9	11	1 unconfirmed
Constantin Ursache	9	11	1 unconfirmed
Florian Alexiu	8	11	1 unconfirmed
Christu I. Christu	4 + 4^{*}	11	
Ștefan Octavian Ciutac	6	11	
Nicolae Macri	5	11	
Ioan Ivancievici	4 + 3^{*}	11	2 unconfirmed
Nicolae Burileanu	10	10	1 unconfirmed
Liviu Mureșan	9	10	2 unconfirmed
Laurențiu Cătană	8	10	
Emil Bălan	7	10	2 unconfirmed
Ioan Dimache	6 + 1^{*}	10	
Mircea Mazilu	5 + 2^{*}	10	3 unconfirmed
Constantin Dimache	4 + 3^{*}	10	
Dumitru Baciu	5 + 1^{*}	10	2 unconfirmed
Gheorghe Hăpăianu	9	9	2 unconfirmed
Florian Budu	9	9	
Parsifal Ștefănescu	7	9	
Petre Cordescu	6	9	
Alexandru Moldoveanu	6	9	2 unconfirmed
Mircea Șenchea	6	9	3 unconfirmed
Gheorghe Parsinopol	3	9	1 unconfirmed
Constantin Baltă	3	9	1 unconfirmed
Constantin Georgescu	3	9	1 unconfirmed
Petre Mihăilescu	3	9	1 unconfirmed
Gheorghe Mociorniță	3	9	1 unconfirmed
Jean Sandru	3	9	1 unconfirmed
Ioan Sandu	3	9	1 unconfirmed
Panait Grigore	3	9	2 unconfirmed
Constantin Nicoară	7	8	2 unconfirmed
Gheorghe Cocebaș	6	8	
Emil Georgescu	5	8	1 unconfirmed
Ștefan Pucas	5	8	1 unconfirmed
Ioan Marinciu	4	8	
Gheorghe Alexandru Grecu	3 + 1^{*}	8	1 unconfirmed
Carol Anastasescu	3	8	1 unconfirmed
Vasile Forțu	7	7	2 unconfirmed
Ioan Florea	5	7	
Constantin Pomuț	5	7	1 unconfirmed
Vasile Mirilă	4	7	
Aurel Vlădăreanu	3	7	
Titus Gheorghe Ionescu	3	7	1 unconfirmed
Erich Richard Selei	6	6	1 unconfirmed
Ioan Vornica	6	6	
Radu Reinek	5 + 1^{*}	6	
Constantin P. Popescu	5	6	
Iuliu Anca	5	6	1 unconfirmed
Pavel Țurcanu	5	6	
Nicolae Naghirneac	4	6	2 unconfirmed
Iosif Ciuhulescu	2 + 3^{*}	6	1 unconfirmed
Dumitru Niculescu	2 + 3^{*}	6	
Ștefan Florescu	3	6	
Eugen Taflan	3	6	1 unconfirmed
Virgil Anghelescu	2	6	
Pavel Bucșa	2	6	
Vasile Ioniță	2	6	1 unconfirmed
Mircea Teodorescu	2	6	1 unconfirmed
Gheorghe Gulan	1 + 1^{*}	6	
Petre Scurtu	2^{*}	6	
Vintilă V. Brătianu	5	5	
Mihai Belcin	4 + 1^{*}	5	
Florea Iordache	5	5	1 unconfirmed
Ioan Mihăilescu	5	5	1 unconfirmed
Emil Droc	5	5	2 unconfirmed
Costin Miron	5	5	2 unconfirmed
Romeo Neacșu	5	5	2 unconfirmed
Ioan Bocșan	5	5	
Marin Ghica	5	5	
Ioan Simionescu	4	5	
Alexandru Economu	4	5	1 unconfirmed
Nicolae Sculy Logotheti	4	5	1 unconfirmed
Nicolae Iolu	4	5	
Gheorghe Pisoschi	3 + 1^{*}	5	1 unconfirmed
Dumitru Encioiu	3	5	
Ioan Roșescu	3	5	
Nicolae Bătrânu	3	5	1 unconfirmed
Vasile Pascu	2 + 1^{*}	5	1 unconfirmed
Clemente Mureșan	2	5	
Petre Constantinescu	2	5	1 unconfirmed
Alexandru Manoliu	5	5	

^{*} Shared victory

== Bibliography ==
- Bernád, Dénes (20 June 2003). Rumanian Aces of World War 2. Osprey Publishing. ISBN 978-1841765358.
