= Grupul 2 Aeronautic =

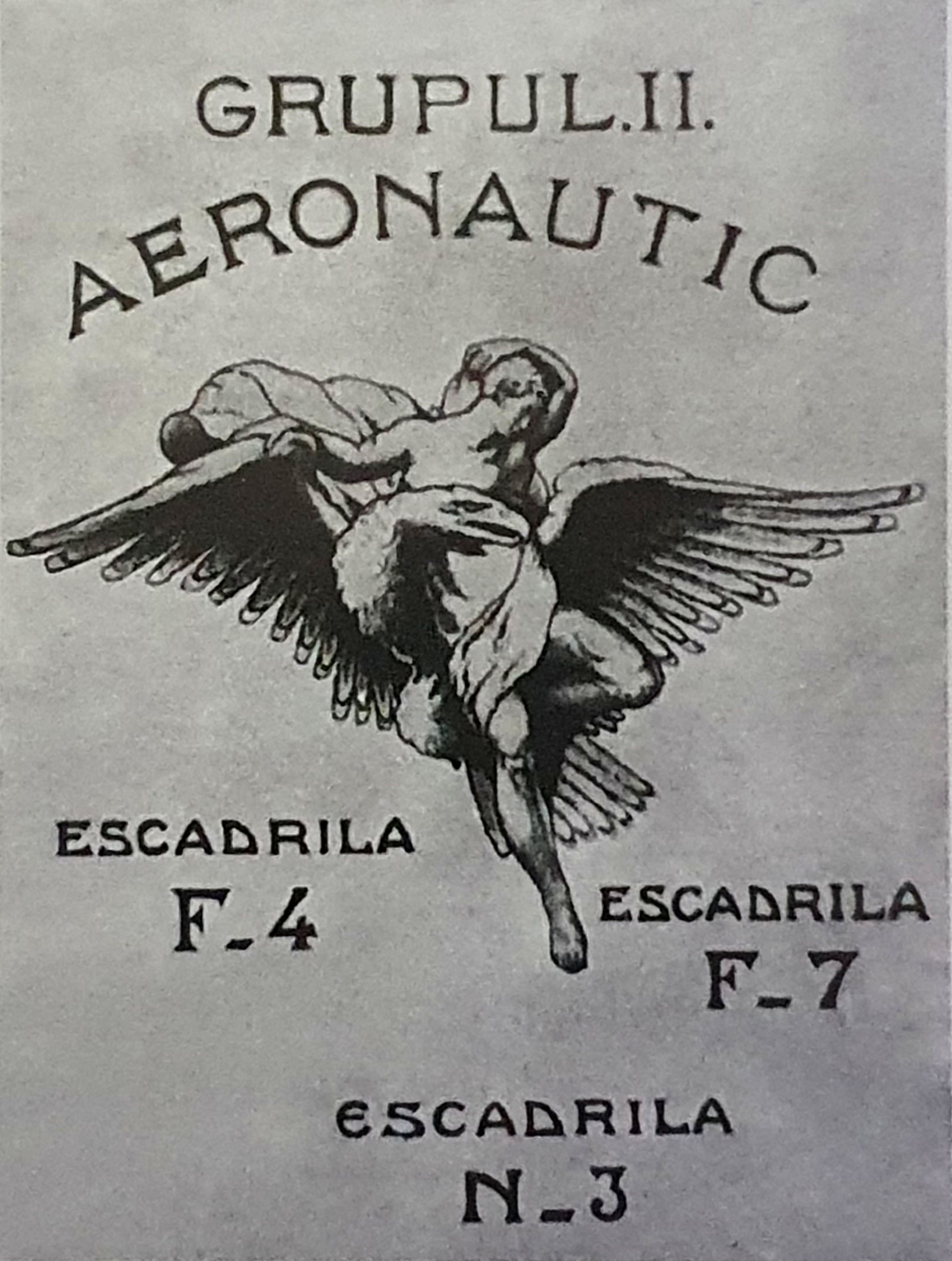
- Emblem of the Group, early 1917
- Active: 1916 – 1929 (as the 2nd Group)
- Country: Romania
- Branch: Romanian Air Corps
- Type: Aeronautical Group
- Garrison/HQ: Tecuci
- Engagements: First World War: Romanian Campaign (1917); Battle of Mărăști; Battle of Mărășești

Commanders
- Notable commanders: Andrei Popovici; Sever Pleniceanu

Grupul 2 Aeronautic ("2nd Aeronautical Group" in English), also known as Grupul 2 Aviație ("2nd Aviation Group") was one of the three groups of the Romanian Air Corps created following the aviation reorganization in the winter of 1916/1917. In the 1920s, it was transformed into the 2nd Bombardment Group, then into the 1st Fighter Flotilla (Flotila 1 Vânătoare) in 1937.

== History ==
At the end of 1916, General Constantin Prezan, the new Chief of the M.C.G., advised by the Chief of the French Military Mission, decided to reorganize the Romanian aviation. As a result of this reorganization, the aviation was composed of 3 Aeronautical Groups with 6 reconnaissance squadrons, 4 fighter squadrons, 1 long-range reconnaissance squadron, 1 bombardment squadron and 5 aerostation companies. Each Aeronautical Group was assigned to a Romanian or Russian army. Grupul 2 Aeronautic, headquartered at Tecuci was initially assigned to the 4th Russian Army.

The group, commanded by Major (Maj.) Andrei Popovici, was composed of 1 fighter and 2 reconnaissance squadrons:

- Escadrila F.4 - commanded by Captain (Cpt.) Haralambie Giossanu
- Escadrila F.7 - commanded by Cpt. André Goulin
- Escadrila N.3 - commanded by Cpt. Maurice Gond

From the beginning of the summer of 1917, in preparation for the military operations, 2 new squadrons were created: Escadrila F.9, commanded by Cpt. Bertrand de Fraguier and Escadrila N.11, commanded by Cpt. Ștefan Protopopescu and the group was reassigned to the 1st Romanian Army. Escadrila C.12 was also assigned to the group.

=== Campaign of 1917 ===
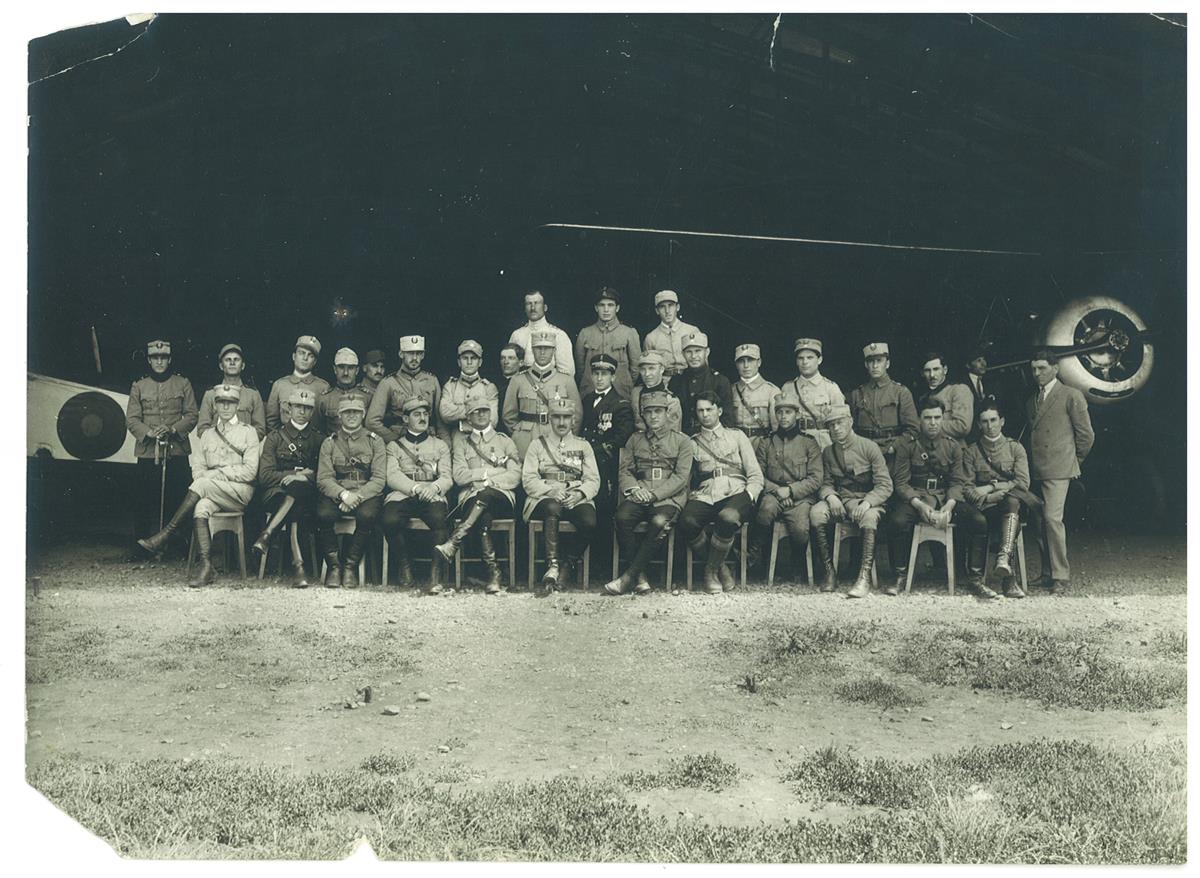
Airmen of the 2nd Aeronautical Group in 1917

During the course of the month of June 1917, airmen from all of the aeronautical groups carried out reconnaissance, bombing and artillery fire directing missions over the enemy lines. The squadrons of Grupul 2 Aeronautic, together with Grupul 1 Aeronautic directly contributed to the success of the Battle of Mărăști. During the Battle of Mărășești, reconnaissance missions protected by the fighter aircraft were carried out consistently over the front of the 1st Romanian Army. In the front sectors where the Romanian artillery did not cause enough damage, the airmen of the F.4 squadron carried out bombing raids. The N.11 and N.3 squadrons protected the front from enemy airplanes, engaging in aerial fights almost every day. On 6 August 1917, the airmen of F.7 and F.4 squadrons managed to spot the retreating Russian troops, alerting the Romanian Headquarters just in time, allowing the 5th Romanian Division to intervene and stop the German advance.

On 10 August 1917, Grupul 2 Aeronautic executed 38 combat missions, taking photographs of enemy artillery batteries, aerodromes and other installations, providing information on troop movements as well as directing friendly artillery fire. During the night, bombing raids were carried out on key targets. On 19 August, the F.7 and F.9 squadrons attacked the enemy troops, executing a number of 14 bombing missions, at the same time they directed the Russian and Romanian heavy artillery fire on the enemy positions. During the month of August 1917, the pilots of Escadrila N.11 achieved a high number of flight hours with Ion Muntenescu achieving 50 flight hours, Egon Nasta–47 hours, Vasile Craiu–41 hours and Paul Magâlea–35 hours.

Starting from 22 September 1917, Grupul 2 Aeronautic was reorganized, now being composed of:

- Escadrila F.5 - with the aerodrome at Domnești
- Escadrila F.9 - at Țigănești
- Escadrila N.3 and Escadrila N.11 - both at Tecuci

On 7 November 1917, Romanian pilots of the N.11 and F.9 squadrons shot down 5 enemy aircraft.

=== 1918 ===
From January 1918, Grupul 2 Aeronautic, commanded by Maj. Sever Pleniceanu, was organized as such:

- Escadrila F.5 - with the aerodrome at Bârlad
- Escadrila S.8
- Escadrila N.11 - at Adjud
- Escadrila N.3 - at Tecuci

The first combat missions of 1918 on the Romanian front were carried out by the pilots of the N.11 squadron who attempted to intercept 3 Russian SPADs which were flying over Galați, however, they were unsuccessful due to the greater speed of the SPADs.

Following Order no. 275/1918, Grupul 2 Aeronautic moved Escadrila S.8 to Bârlad, together with Escadrila S.5 (ex-F.5). The other squadrons remained on the same aerodromes.

=== 1920–1929 ===
The group was moved to Bucharest by 1920, where it was renamed to the 2nd Bombardment Group. The unit, located on the Pipera airfield, was transformed into the Military Aviation Flotilla (Flotila aviație de luptă) in 1929 with the reorganization of the Air Force. It was composed of mixed units, consisting of a fighter group, and a bombardment group with two squadrons – one for day bombing, and one for night bombing. The Military Aviation Flotilla became the first aviation unit to receive the newly introduced fourragère for the Order of Michael the Brave in March 1931. The same year, it received the fourragère for the Order of Aeronautical Virtue as well.

== 1st Fighter Flotilla ==
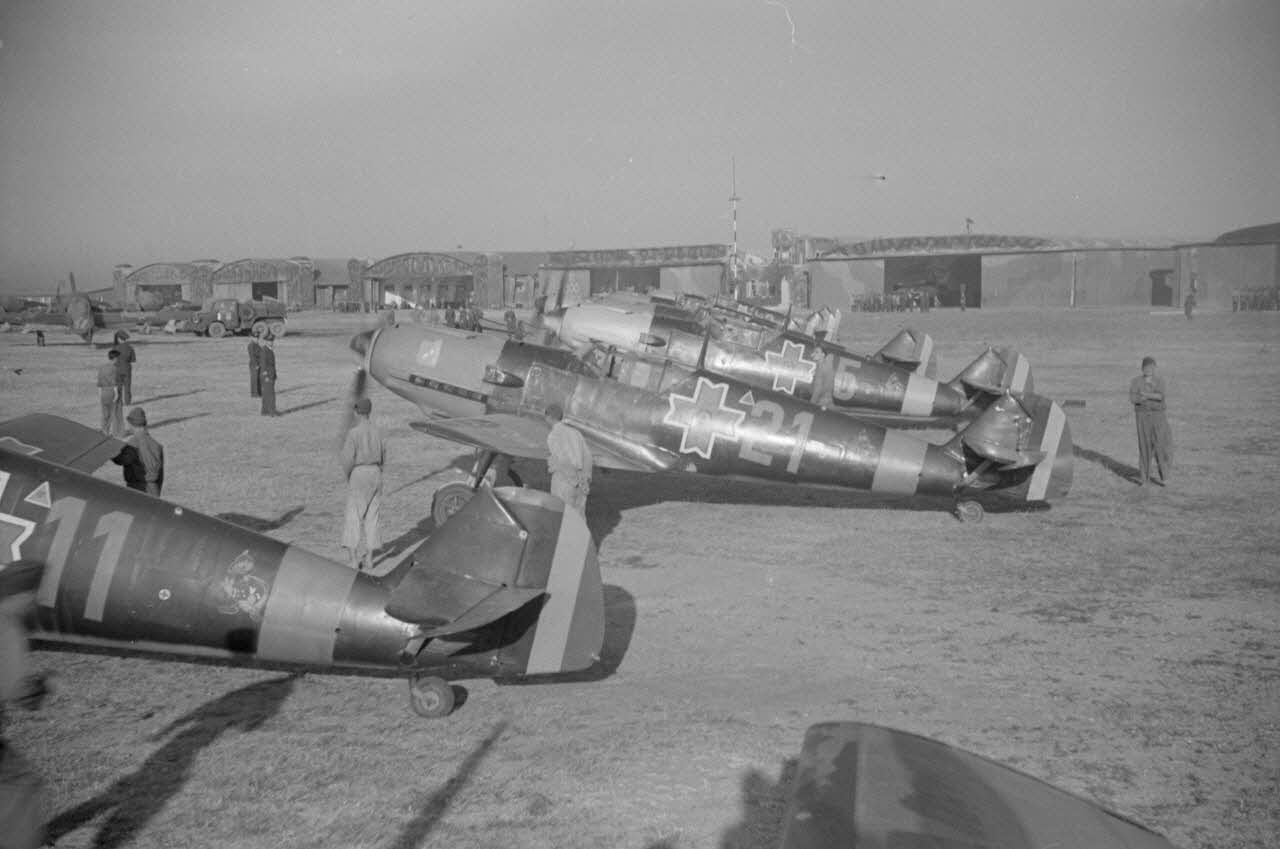
Bf 109E fighters of the flotilla in 1942

In 1937, the flotilla was converted into the 1st Fighter Flotilla (Flotila 1 Vânătoare). During the confrontations with the Royal Hungarian Air Force over Transylvania in 1940, the 1st Fighter Flotilla deployed the 51st Fighter Squadron of the 5th Fighter Group to Cluj in order to aid the 2nd Fighter Flotilla. On 28 August, a Heinkel He 112 of the 51st Squadron shot down a Hungarian Caproni Ca.135 near Berveni.

In 1941, the 1st Fighter Flotilla was composed of the 7th Fighter Group (with the 56th, 57th, and 58th Squadrons), and the 5th Fighter Group (with the 51st, 52nd, and 53rd Squadrons) and assigned to the Air Combat Group. The unit was equipped with He 112, Bf 109, and Hawker Hurricane fighters and took part in the 1941 campaign in Bessarabia, Bukovina, and Odessa. During this period, the flotilla under the command of Captain-Commander Mihail Romanescu obtained 146 certain air victories, 18 probable victories and 47 ground victories.

In 1942, units of the 1st Fighter Flotilla further took part in the campaign on the Eastern Front, with the 7th Fighter Group participating in the Battle of Stalingrad. One of the pilots who distinguished himself during this battle was Alexandru Șerbănescu. The flotilla was disbanded on 15 December 1944 along with the 53rd, 56th, and 57th Squadrons. In the summer of 1945, the flotilla was redeployed to Bucharest and assigned to Escadra 1 Aviație within the Aviation Division. The flotilla continued to exist until 1949 when all flotillas (air wings) were converted into aviation regiments following the Soviet Air Force model.

Between 1941 and 1945, the 1st Fighter Flotilla had the following units:

- 5th Fighter Group (Grupul 5 Vânătoare), with the 51st, 52nd, and 53rd Fighter Squadrons
- 7th Fighter Group (Grupul 7 Vânătoare), with the 56th, 57th, and 58th Fighter Squadrons
- 9th Fighter Group (Grupul 9 Vânătoare), with the 47th, 48th, and 56th Fighter Squadrons

== See also ==
- Grupul 1 Aeronautic
- List of Romanian Air Force units

== Bibliography ==
- Buzenchi, Laurențiu (2019). "Aeronautica militară română – Cluj". Aviația clujeană (PDF) (in Romanian). Cluj-Napoca: Casa Cărții de Știință.
- Lazar, Adrian; Stambuliu, Bogdan (2016). Military and sociopolitical badges of Romania 1859-1947. Bucharest: Galeria Numismatica.
