= Alexandru Șerbănescu =

Romanian flying ace (1912–1944)

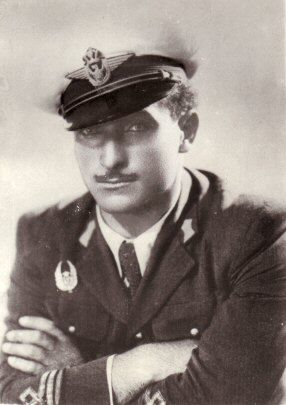
- Alexandru Șerbănescu
- Born: 17 May 1912; Colonești, Olt County, Kingdom of Romania
- Died: 18 August 1944 (aged 32); Rușavăț, Buzău County, Romania
- Burial place: Ghencea Cemetery, Bucharest
- Military career
- Allegiance: Kingdom of Romania
- Branch: Romanian Army; Royal Romanian Air Force
- Service years: 1933–1942 (Army); 1942–1944 (Air Force)
- Rank: Captain
- Nicknames: Alecu; The Eagle of Wallachia and The Green Pine of the Carpathian Mountains
- Unit: 7th Fighter Group
- Commands: 57th Fighter Squadron; 9th Fighter Group
- Conflicts: World War II; Eastern Front
- Awards: Order of Michael the Brave; Order of the Star of Romania; Iron Cross

Alexandru "Alecu" Șerbănescu (17 May 1912 in Colonești, Olt County – 18 August 1944 in Rușavăț, Buzău County) was a leading Romanian fighter pilot and flying ace in World War II. At the end of Romania's campaign on the side of the Axis, Șerbănescu was the country's leading ace, dying only 5 days before the country changed sides. He was credited with 47 aircraft confirmed destroyed (3 American) and 8 probables (1 American).

In the spring of 1942 he was assigned as a pilot to the 7th Fighter Group, which fought with the German forces against the Soviet Union on the Eastern Front, including at the Battle of Stalingrad. He flew mostly IAR-80 and Messerschmitt Bf 109 fighters.

== Early life ==
Alexandru Şerbănescu was born on 17 May 1912 in Colonești, Olt County. He graduated as an infantry Sublocotenent in 1933 and joined a mountain warfare unit at Brașov. He joined the aerial observers' school in 1939 and the pilots' school in 1940, obtaining his combat pilot brevet on 31 October. He flew on various fighters: PZL P.11, IAR 80 and then Bf 109E.

== Eastern front ==
The 7th Fighter Group was detached in 1942 to the Stalingrad front. Șerbănescu distinguished himself in the fierce battles during the retreat from the airfields around Stalingrad. When the Red Army broke the German and Romanian defenses in November 1942 and approached the Romanian airfield where the 7th Fighter Group was stationed, Șerbănescu successfully organized the defense of the airbase against the Soviet forces, helped by his infantry experience. He had at his disposal only two anti-aircraft guns (one Rheinmetall 37mm and one 75mm Vickers-Reșița gun), the 20mm guns on the Bf 109Es and a company of ill-equipped and trained soldiers. The Romanians' camouflaged positions and well-led defense stopped the Soviet tanks attacking the airfield for two days. The Bf 109's 20 mm guns were used as antitank weapons on the ground (by lifting the airplane's tail on barrels), this being a unique case of airplane-tank duel. On November 23, 1942, the Romanian troops evacuated eight Bf 109E (another 3 were lost while they tried to take off under fire). Each airplane carried two or three people in the cockpit. After this, what remained of Șerbănescu's unit was stationed on the Morozovskaya airfield and was soon withdrawn to Romania for rest and recuperation.

Using his ground combat experience, Șerbănescu organised his troops to repulse the Soviet attack on the airfield at Karpovka on 22 November 1942. Subsequently, under his leadership, the squadron's airworthy machines took off before dawn.

Șerbănescu was twice wounded in the face in 1943, once in July and again on 20 August, the latter occasion leaving him with a permanent scar.

== Back to Romania ==
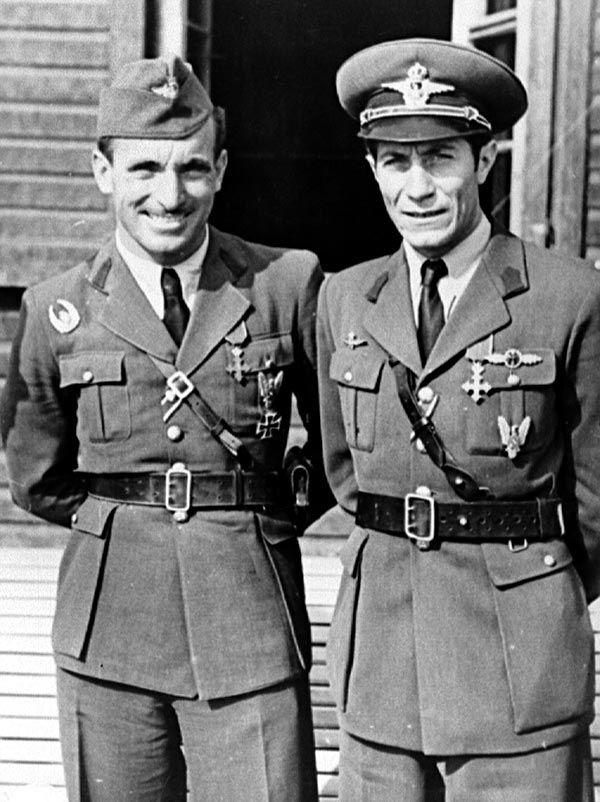
Şerbănescu and Ioan Dicezare, August 30, 1943

On March 29, 1943, Șerbănescu was appointed commander of the 57th Fighter Squadron, equipped with the new Messerschmitt Bf 109G, and promoted to the rank of Captain. Between June and August 1943 he shot down 28 Allied aircraft, and received the highest Romanian military decoration, Order of Michael the Brave, 3rd Class. On October 23, the 9th Fighter Group replaced the battle-exhausted 7th Fighter Group, but Șerbănescu and the other aces remained. He kept fighting and shooting down airplanes of the Allies and, as a result, he was named the Group's commander on February 13, 1944.

In May 1944 the Red Army entered Romania and occupied northern Bessarabia and northern Moldavia, but they were stopped after some fierce fighting (see also: Battle of Târgul Frumos), in which the pilots also played a very important role.

On 11 June 1944, Șerbănescu shot down his first USAAF aircraft, a B-17 Flying Fortress. This was followed by two P-51 Mustangs shot down on the last day of July and on 4 August respectively, which were his last kills. He also claimed a P-38 Lightning on 22 July, however this remains unconfirmed.

== Death ==
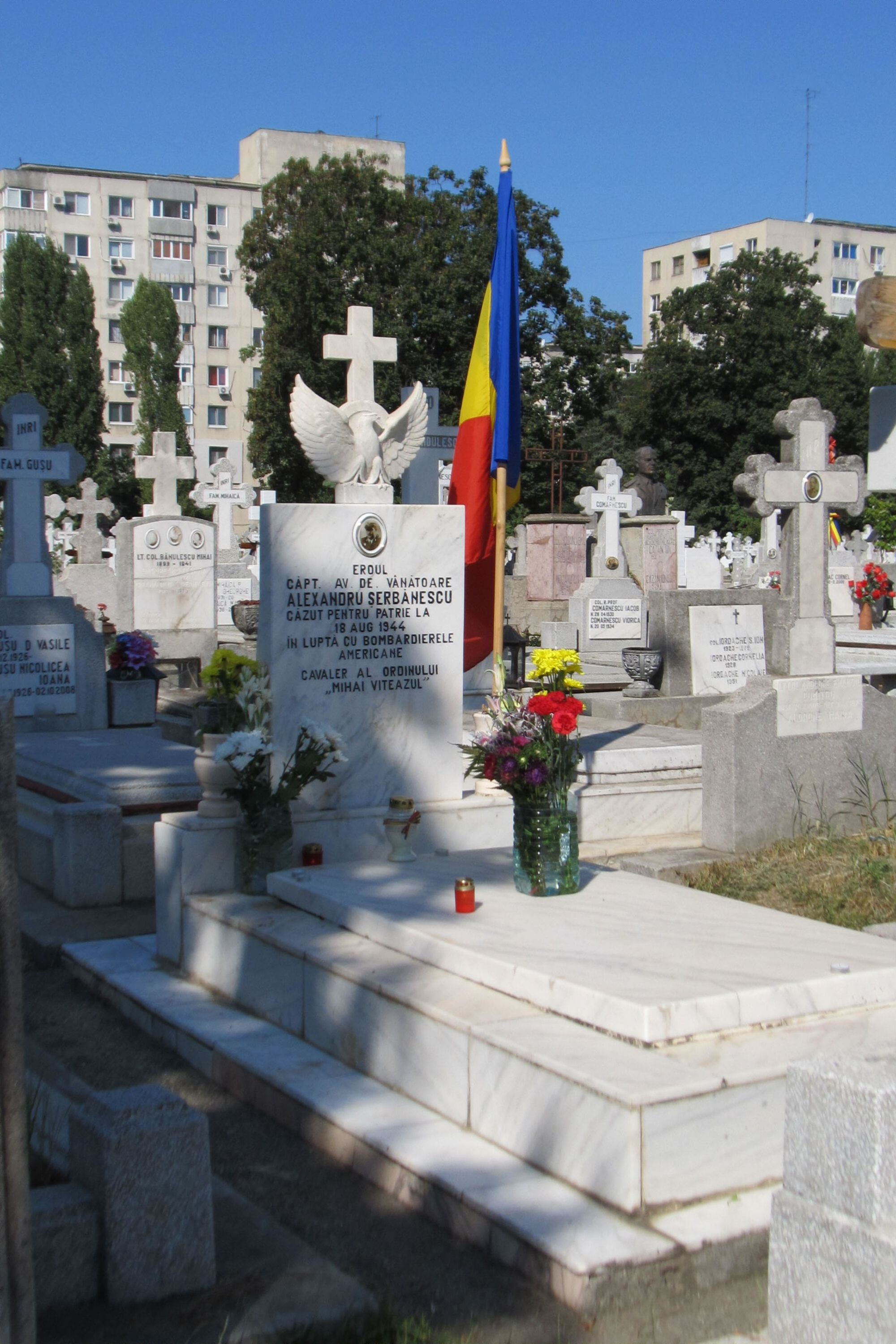
Șerbănescu's grave at Ghencea Cemetery

On August 18, 1944, Șerbănescu took off on his last mission. On that day, he and his twelve wingmen, together with twelve other fighters from the 9th Fighter Group, attacked a swarm of Mustangs and Lightnings. When Lieutenant Dobran and Adjutant Dârjan tried to clear his tail, it was too late. His last words were: "I'm going down...". Apparently his radio was not functioning properly and he could not hear his wingmen's warnings. Following Șerbănescu's death, all Romanian fighters were issued orders to refrain from engaging the Americans until a new strategy would be adopted. Five days later, on August 23, 1944, a coup d'état led by King Michael of Romania deposed Marshal Ion Antonescu and Romania switched to the Allied side.

During his entire piloting career, Șerbănescu was credited with 47 confirmed victories (and 8 probable) in aerial combat which, with eight unconfirmed, yielded 55 points in the Romanian scoring system, second only to Constantin Cantacuzino with 69.

== Legacy ==
The 23 August 1990 issue of The New York Times took note of Alexandru Şerbănescu's emerging post-Communist rehabilitation, stating that he had been recently commemorated by the daily România liberă with a front-page article. While the NYT issue acknowledges that he shot down some American aircraft, it wrongly labels them as B-24 Liberators. Şerbănescu never shot down any B-24s, but a B-17 Flying Fortress and two P-51 Mustangs, plus an unconfirmed P-38 Lightning. Alexandru Şerbănescu was the top-scoring ace of Axis Romania: the country changed sides five days after his death and at the time of his death he was the top-scoring Romanian ace. In terms of the number of aircraft destroyed, he was credited with 47 confirmed victories and 8 probables. Having died fighting an enemy which enjoyed both technological and numerical supremacy, and not being "tainted" by any contribution to the campaign against the Axis, Şerbănescu became a legend among Romanians. The boulevard in Bucharest that today bears his name is a unique tribute to a Romanian wartime pilot.

Today, a boulevard in Bucharest bears his name and passes very close to Aurel Vlaicu Airport. Each year, on 18 August, veterans, air force officers and aviation enthusiasts gather at his tomb to commemorate him. On August 18, 2004, the 30th Honor Guard Regiment commemorated, with military honors, the sixty years that had passed since Capt. Şerbănescu was killed in action.

On December 1, 2006, the 95th Air Base of the Romanian Air Force received the honorific title Cpt. Av. Alexandru Șerbănescu.

== See also ==
- List of World War II flying aces from Romania
- Horia Agarici
- Constantin Cantacuzino
- Romanian Air Force
