= Ermil Gheorghiu =

Romanian general and commander of the Romanian Air Force

Ermil Gheorghiu, in approximately 1944

Ermil Gheorghiu (13 February 1896, Botoșani – 14 January 1977, Bucharest) was a Romanian general and commander of the Romanian Air Force during World War II. He was a recipient of the Knight's Cross of the Iron Cross.

== Awards ==
- Knight's Cross of the Iron Cross (4 April 1944)
