= Golubinskaya =

Golubinskaya Голубинская
- Stanitsa
- Location within Volgograd Oblast Location within Russia
- Coordinates: 48°50′N 43°33′E
- Country: Russia
- Region: Volgograd Oblast
- District: Kalachyovsky District
- Time zone: UTC+4:00

Golubinskaya (Russian: Голубинская) is a rural locality (a stanitsa) and the administrative center of Golubinskoye Rural Settlement, Kalachyovsky District, Volgograd Oblast, Russia. The population was 1,221 as of 2010. There are 29 streets.

== Geography ==
Golubinskaya is located in steppe, on the right bank of the Don River, 39 km north of Kalach-na-Donu (the district's administrative centre) by road. Malogolubinsky is the nearest rural locality.
