= Ioan Dicezare =

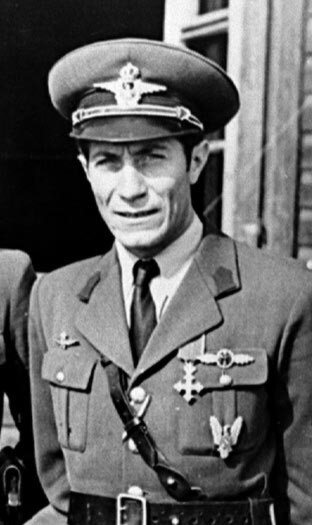
- 2nd lt. Ioan Dicezare, 1943
- Born: 12 August 1916; Bucharest, Kingdom of Romania
- Died: 10 August 2012 (aged 95); Bucharest, Romania
- Military career
- Allegiance: (Romania) Royal Romanian Armed Forces
- Branch: Royal Romanian Air Force
- Rank: General-locotenent (OF-8)
- Units: 7th Fighter Group; 1st Fighter Group
- Commands: 58th Fighter Squadron
- Conflicts: Second World War; Eastern Front
- Awards: Order of Michael the Brave, Iron Cross

Ioan Dicezare (August 12, 1916 in Bucharest – August 10, 2012 in Bucharest) was a leading Romanian fighter pilot and flying ace in World War II. He was born and died in Bucharest.

On April 22, 1943, Dicezare engaged a Soviet bomber formation and shot down one A-20 Boston, which fell behind Axis lines. He then returned to the airfield and took the group's liaison Bf-108 Taifun. He landed near the crash site and took the pilot and the observer prisoner.

In over 500 combat operations, he was credited with 16 confirmed victories (and 3 probable) in aerial combat.

Dicezare died on 10 August 2012, at age 95. He was the last survivor of "Grupul 7 Vânătoare" pilots who managed to escape the Stalingrad encirclement.

== Decorations and awards ==
- Order of Michael the Brave, 3rd class (August 30, 1943) - campaign from Mariupol
- Order of Aeronautical Virtue, Gold Cross with two bars and Knight with two straps (1943) - campaigns in the USSR from 1943
- Order of the Crown of Romania, 1st class with swords and Military Virtue ribbon (1943?)
- Iron Cross of 1939
  - 2nd class (probably June 6, 1943)
  - 1st class (probably August 17, 1943)

== See also ==
- List of World War II flying aces from Romania
- Romanian Air Force

== Bibliography ==
- Craciunoiu, Cristian (June 1999). "As roumain 39/45: Ioan Dicezare" [Romanian Ace Ioan Dicezare]. Avions (in French) (75): 28–35. ISSN 1243-8650.
- Sorin Turturică, Cruciaţi ai înălţimilor. Grupul 7 Vânătoare de la Prut la Odessa, București: Editura Militară, 2012 (in Romanian) ISBN 978-973-32-0888-4
- Vasile Tudor - Un nume de legenda - Căpitan av. erou Alexandru Șerbănescu, București: Editura Modelism, 1998 (in Romanian) ISBN 973-97984-9-7
