= Constantin Cantacuzino (aviator) =

Romanian aviator

- Constantin Cantacuzino
- Born: 11 November 1905; Bucharest, Kingdom of Romania
- Died: 26 May 1958 (aged 52); Madrid, Spain
- Military career
- Allegiance: Kingdom of Romania
- Branch: Royal Romanian Air Force
- Service years: 1941–1945
- Rank: Captain
- Nickname: "Bâzu"
- Units: 53rd Fighter Squadron; 58th Fighter Squadron; 7th Fighter Group
- Conflicts: World War II
- Awards: Iron Cross, 1st Class

Prince Constantin Cantacuzino (nicknamed Bâzu; 11 November 1905 – 26 May 1958) was a Romanian aviator, the leading World War II fighter ace of his country, as well as a member of the Cantacuzino family.

== Early life ==
Cantacuzino was born in Bucharest. His father was Prince Mihail Cantacuzino and his mother Maria Tescanu Rosetti, later known as Maruca Cantacuzino; they were both from old Romanian noble families. After his father died, Maria Rosetti married for a second time, to George Enescu (Romania's greatest composer and a world class violinist).

Constantin Cantacuzino went to high-school in Bucharest. He loved motor sports and he could afford to practice them all the time. He was an excellent motor bike racer, winning several races, and driver. He set a new record on the Paris-Bucharest race. He also played tennis and was the captain of the Romanian ice hockey team at the World Championships in 1931 and 1933.

== World War II ==
In 1939 he won the national aerial aerobatics contest with his Bü 133 Jungmeister and in 1941 was named chief pilot of the Romanian national air transport company LARES. Even though this was a comfortable job, he managed to get in the front line as a fighter pilot in the 53rd Fighter Squadron (equipped with Hurricane Mk. I).

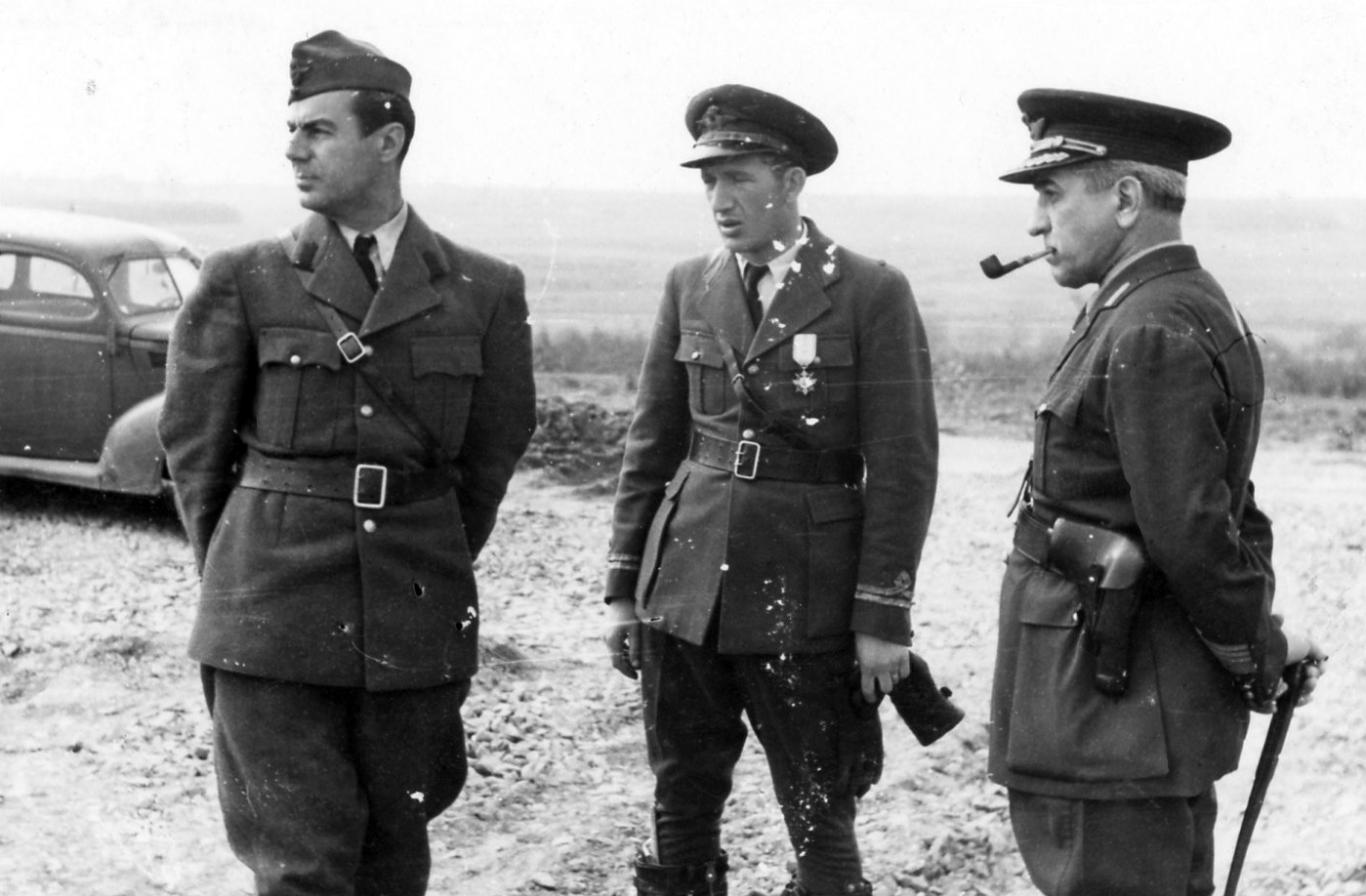
(from left to right) Cantacuzino with Mircea T. Bădulescu, Squadron Leader and Traian Burduloiu, commander of the 1st Romanian Air Corps on the Western Front, Lucenec (Slovakia) April 1945

After the capture of Odessa, the Romanian Army reduced the number of front line troops and he was one of the reservists who were sent home. He took up his position at LARES. However he managed to arrange a return to active duty in 1943. On 26 April 1943 he was remobilized and assigned to the 7th Fighter Group, which was equipped with the new Messerschmitt Bf 109. On 5 May he arrived on the front line and was named commander of the 58th Fighter Squadron. On 29 June, he and his wingman engaged four Yakolevs, two La-5s and four Spitfires, while trying to protect three Romanian Ju 88 bombers. His wingman was badly hit and forced to return to base. He continued the fight on his own and shot down two Spitfires. His aircraft was damaged, but managed to escape and make a belly landing. Two of the bombers were destroyed. In July he flew both day and night missions, even though his aircraft was not equipped for low-visibility flying. Cantacuzino tried to stop the Soviet night bombings of his airfield. The Germans protested, considering him a little mad, and so he eventually gave up the night missions.

On 27 July 1943, he shot down the Soviet Air Forces' flying ace Nikolay F. Khimushin (12 kills). Between 2 and 5 August he shot down nine aircraft (four Yaks and five Ilyushin Il-2 ground attack aircraft), raising his score to 27. On 5 August he was alone on patrol and he encountered a Soviet formation about 40–50 planes strong (Il-2s and Yaks). He realized that he could not destroy them all, but felt he could inflict some damage on the formation. He dove into the Il-2 formation and shot down two of them before he was attacked by the Soviet fighters. He managed to shake them off and shoot down one. The day of 16 August was an excellent day for the pilots of the 7th Fighter Group. They scored 22 confirmed kills and five probables, with Cantacuzino shooting down three (two La-5s and an Il-2). On 28 August he received the Iron Cross, 1st class.

In the autumn of 1943 Cantacuzino became ill and was interned in a hospital and was kept from the front so he could rest and recuperate. On 10 February 1944 he returned to active duty in the 7th Fighter Group, which was sent to the front with the Soviets in Moldova. On 15 April, there was a USAAF raid and Cantacuzino and his wingmen attacked the bomber formations and shot down six B-24 Liberators (the prince got one himself). He continued flying missions against the Soviet Air Force and scored several victories.

In August 1944, Cantacuzino became the commander of the 9th Fighter Group, succeeding Captain Alexandru Șerbănescu, who was shot down in combat with US fighters on August 18.

After 23 August 1944, when Romania quit the Axis, the Luftwaffe started bombing Bucharest from airfields close to the capital which were still in German hands. The remains of the 7th and 9th Fighter Groups were brought in to protect the capital. Cantacuzino shot down 3 Heinkel He 111s on this occasion.

Cantacuzino later flew on a special mission: to transport Lieutenant-Colonel James Gunn III, the highest ranking American prisoner-of-war in Romania, to the airbase at Foggia and return to Romania with B-17s converted for transport duty to airlift over 1,000 U.S. POWs in what was to be called Operation Reunion. He returned flying a P-51 Mustang because his Bf 109 was damaged by an American pilot. He needed only one flight to become familiar with the new aircraft and dazzled the Americans with his aerobatics. While in Italy, Cantacuzino was treated as a guest, and even meeting with the Supreme Allied Commander of the Mediterranean Theater of Operations.

On 25 February 1945, piloting his Messerschmitt Bf 109G, he shot down one Focke-Wulf Fw 190 piloted by Hermann Heim. This occurred about 3 km from Zvolenská Slatina in Czechoslovakia.

Cantacuzino was credited with 43 aerial victories (one shared) and 11 unconfirmed. According to the counting system used through much of the war, his kill total was 69, the highest in the Romanian Air Force.

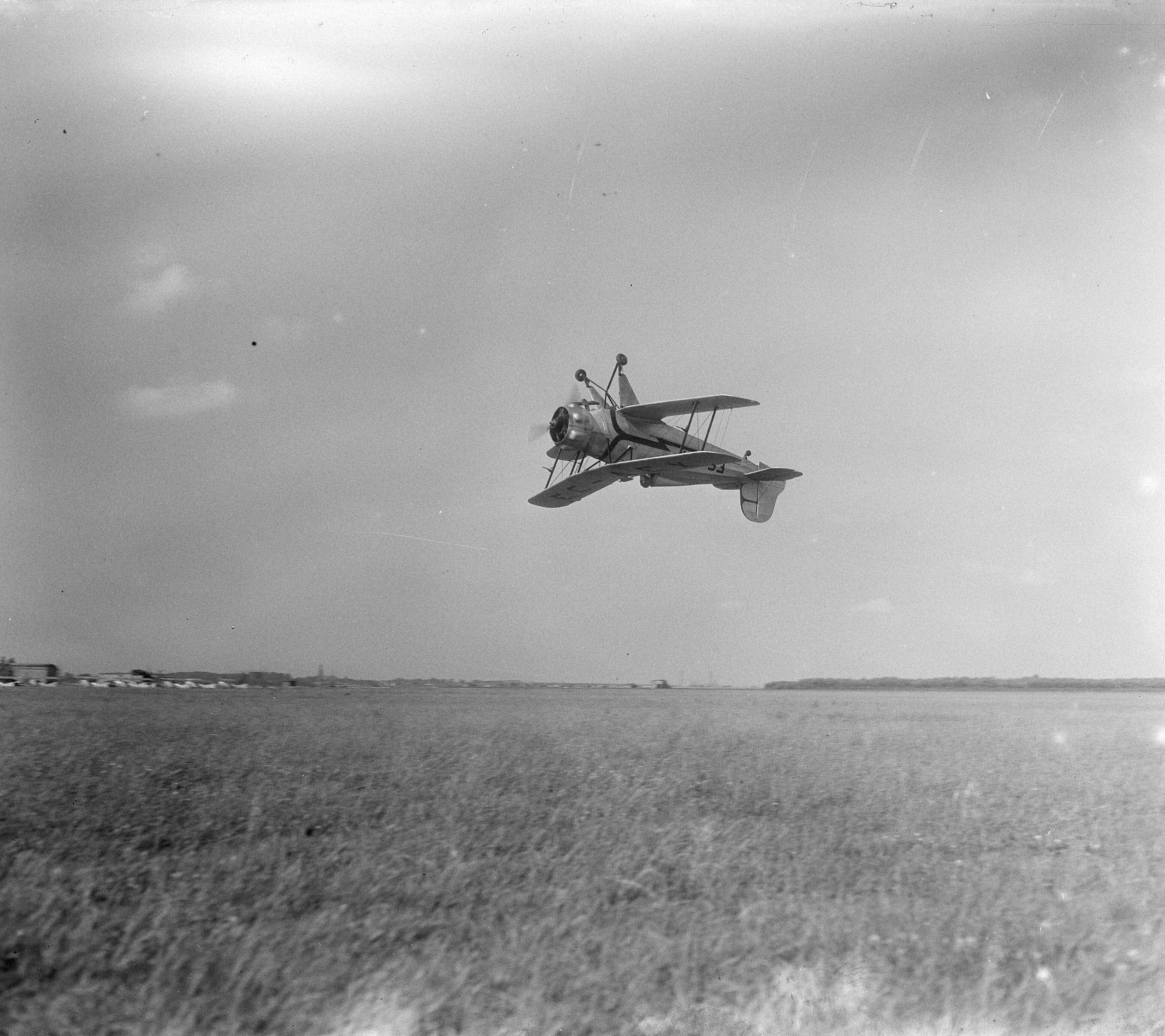
Cantacuzino giving a demonstration in the Netherlands in his Bücker Bü 133 in 1952

== After World War II ==
After the war ended, Cantacuzino was demobilized and returned to LARES. The USSR imposed a communist regime that confiscated private property and began imprisoning the old elite and opponents of the regime. Cantacuzino lost all his land and soon his wife left him. In 1946 he married Nadia Gray. He managed to escape to Italy in 1947 and then he settled in Spain. There he was helped by the Romanian community to buy himself an airplane, in order to earn his living at air shows. He died on 26 May 1958.

He was the father of novelist Oana Orlea.

== Units served ==
- 5 July – 31 October 1941 – 53rd Fighter Squadron
- 26 April 1943 – 31 May 1944 – 7th Fighter Group
- 31 May 1944 – 9 May 1945 – 9th Fighter Group

Combat missions: 608

== See also ==
- Alexandru Şerbănescu
- Horia Agarici
- List of World War II air aces
- Romanian Air Force
