= Grupul 9 Vânătoare =

9th Fighter Group
- Grupul 9 Vânătoare
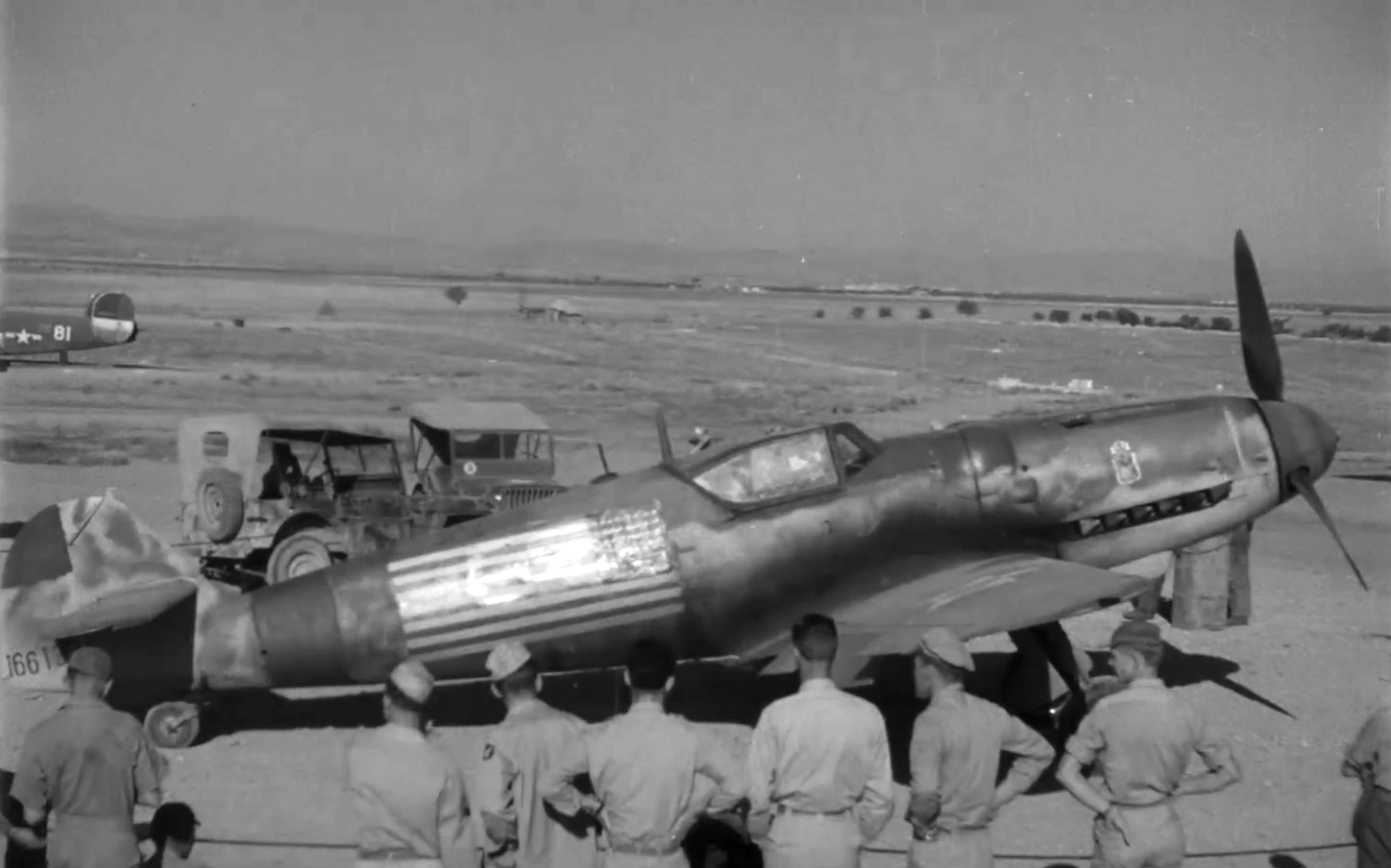
- Cantacuzino's Bf 109G at San Giovanni airfield in Italy painted in American markings (Note: The emblem of the 9th Fighter Group is still visible on the nose of the aircraft)
- Active: 19 April 1942 – 1945
- Country: Romania
- Branch: Royal Romanian Air Force
- Type: Group
- Role: Fighter
- Nickname: Deßloch-Șerbănescu (from June 1944)
- Equipment: IAR 80; Heinkel He 112B; Messerschmitt Bf 109G
- Engagements: Second World War: Eastern Front; Dnieper–Carpathian offensive; First Jassy–Kishinev offensive; Second Jassy–Kishinev offensive; Operation Margarethe II; Bratislava–Brno offensive; Prague offensive; Western Allied campaign in Romania; Operation Frantic; Operation Reunion

Commanders
- Notable commanders: Alexandru Șerbănescu; Constantin Cantacuzino

Insignia
- Emblem of the 9th Fighter Group (Note: From June 1944)

Grupul 9 Vânătoare ("9th Fighter Group" in English) was a Royal Romanian Air Force (ARR) fighter group established on 19 April 1942. It participated in battles on the Eastern Front and defended the country against Western Allied bombing raids in 1944. Under the command of Captain Constantin Cantacuzino, the group fought against the Luftwaffe after 23 August 1944, ending the war in Czechoslovakia in 1945.

== History ==
=== Eastern Front ===
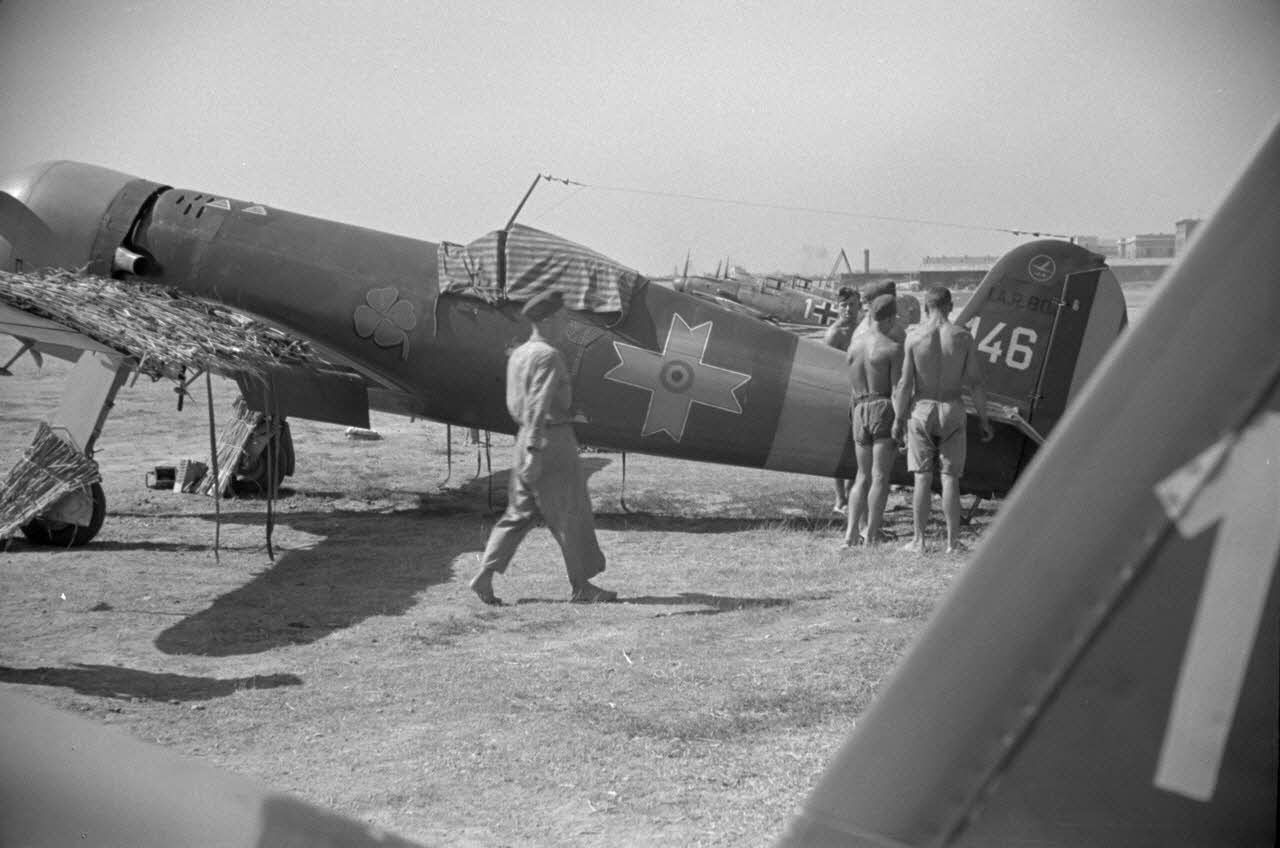
IAR 80A no. 146 of Grupul 9 in 1942 (Note: Note the early "four-leaf clover" emblem of the group painted on the fuselage)

The 9th Fighter Group was established on 19 April 1942 at Pipera as part of Flotila 1 Vânătoare (1st Fighter Flotilla). The group was commanded by Lieutenant Commander Gheorghe Borcescu and consisted of the 47th Fighter Squadron and the 48th Fighter Squadron and operated IAR 80 fighters. Later on, a third squadron, the 52nd Fighter Squadron, was added to the group and remained until August 1942.

The group started training on the He 112B fighter in February 1943 and on 26 March, it was moved to Tiraspol where it began conversion to the Bf 109 on 4 April. In August, 10 pilots of the 9th Group were transferred to the 7th Fighter Group on the frontline. Instructed by German ace Helmut Lipfert, the pilots of the 9th Group finished training on 23 October and the group was moved to Henichesk, replacing the exhausted 7th Group. The 10 pilots assigned earlier to the 7th Group remained with the 9th Group. The first victories were registered right away, with six Soviet aircraft shot down on the same day. By 30 October, the group had to move to Kherson as advancing Soviet tanks threatened its airfield. Between November and December, the group registered 280 sorties, but only 11 dogfights and two victories.

In early 1944, the group was moved several times, settling on the Lepetykha airfield near Mykolaiv. The group started flying combat missions on 9 January. Several times, the Lepetykha airfield was raided by the Soviet Air Forces with Yakovlev fighters and Il-2 attack aircraft - on 14 January Captain (Cpt.) Alexandru Șerbănescu shot down a Yak over the airfield, and on 1 February a further two Yaks and two Il-2s were shot down. The 9th Group was moved to Mykolaiv on 9 February and Cpt. Șerbănescu took command of the group on 13 February. On 10 March 1944, Soviet aircraft launched an attack on the Mykolaiv airfield. The Soviets were engaged by Tudor Greceanu and Tiberiu Vinca, who shot down three aircraft. The continued raids and the approaching Soviet Army forced the 9th Group to relocate to Tatarka near Odesa. The group was then further relocated to Tecuci.

=== Home defense ===
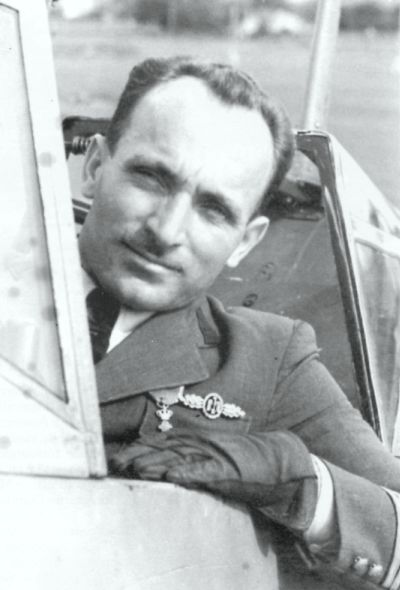
Alexandru Șerbănescu in the cockpit of his Bf 109 in 1944

Starting from April 1944, the 9th Fighter Group began flying escort and free-hunting missions. An important mission that took place was the escorting of Marshal Ion Antonescu's Fi 156 Storch aircraft while on his front inspections. In May, the group began flying missions in the Târgu Frumos area. Air battles were frequent and by the end of the month; 15 enemy aircraft were shot down. A month later, Cpt. Constantin Cantacuzino joined the 9th Group, at the same time, the group was also allowed to intercept USAAF aircraft which were flying on shuttle bombing raids between Italy and the Soviet Union (Operation Frantic). The first battle against the Americans occurred on 6 June and two P-51 Mustangs were shot down. In the following days, missions alternated against the Soviets and Americans until 19 June, when Luftflotte 4 devised a plan code-named "Sternflug" which directed six German fighter groups along with the Romanian 7th and 9th Groups against the Americans. Also in June, six new Bf 109Gs were gifted by the commander of the Luftflotte, Generaloberst Otto Deßloch, the group receiving the nickname "Deßloch-Șerbănescu" on this occasion.

One of the most successful days for the 9th Fighter Group happened on 22 July, when its pilots were sent out to intercept a formation of American P-38 and P-51 fighters. The Romanian pilots managed to surprise the Americans and shot down six P-38s. However, on 26 July, the American fighters returned escorting a bomber formation. Initially thought to be a much smaller force, the Americans turned out to be much more numerous and the 9th Fighter Group took severe losses, with seven Messerschmitts shot down and four pilots killed, among them was Gheorghe Popescu-Ciocănel, an experienced ace pilot and deputy commander of the group. In turn, the group claimed 11 enemy aircraft shot down. The last mission against the Americans took place on 18 August, when 13 Bf 109s of the group led by Cpt. Șerbănescu took off to intercept a large USAAF P-51 fighter force. Joined by 12 Bf 109s from the 7th Fighter Group and a further 21 German Bf 109s, the two sides clashed over the Carpathian Mountains near Brașov. During the engagement, Cpt. Șerbănescu, who was unable to hear the warnings of his wingman likely due to a faulty radio, was shot down and killed. The next day, the USAAF called off the aerial campaign over Romania, while the ARR issued a dispersal order to its fighter groups.

Cpt. Cantacuzino was assigned as the new unit commander and on 20 August, the group began flying missions against the Soviet forces which had launched their massive offensive. By 22 August, the Group had shot down nine Soviet aircraft, but this did not change the outcome of the offensive and Romania ceased all hostilities with the allies following King Michael's coup on 23 August.

=== Anti-Axis campaign ===
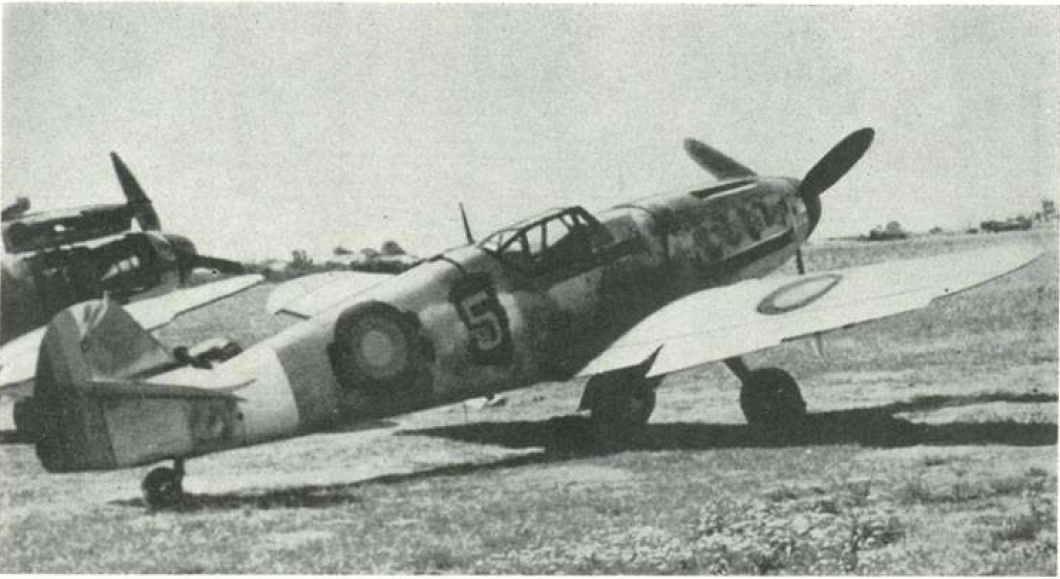
Romanian Bf 109G-6 in late 1944

In the aftermath of the coup, the Germans attempted to overthrow the new government and, after failing on their ground operations, began bombing the capital. As a response, the 9th and 7th Fighter Groups were called to the Popești-Leordeni airfield south of Bucharest and after the official declaration of war against the Axis on 25 August, began intercepting the German bombers. By 31 August, Grupul 9 flew 41 sorties and claimed eight confirmed victories, a further four probable and two aircraft destroyed on the ground. These victories included He 111s, Ju 52s, Ju 87s, Bf 109s, Bf 110s and two Me 323 Gigants.

After the end of the German raids, Cpt. Cantacuzino aided the Americans in repatriating their prisoners of war by transporting the highest ranking US POW in Romania, Lieutenant Colonel James A. Gunn, to Italy with his Bf 109. During the subsequent mission, named Operation Reunion, several Romanian Bf 109s also flew together with US P-51s as escorts for the B-17s carrying the POWs.

Beginning in September, the 9th Fighter Group was merged with the 7th Fighter Group into what was called the 7/9th Fighter Group. (Note: Often referred to as just the 9th Fighter Group) Led by Cpt. Lucian Toma, the group was assigned to the 1st Air Corps and moved to the Turnișor airfield for supporting operations in Southern Transylvania. On 15 September, the group launched a low-level raid on the Someșeni airfield near Cluj. The successful attack saw the destruction of a German Fw 58 by Lieutenant (Lt.) Vasile Gavriliu and a Hungarian MÁVAG Héja by Lt. Ion Dobran as well as three Gotha Go 242 military gliders and several trucks. On 18 September the group clashed with German Bf 109s and lost one airplane and another crash landed. On 25 September, Cpt. Toma crashed after shooting down a Ju 188 reconnaissance aircraft and lost his life. Cpt. Cantacuzino assumed command of the group once again.

In the following months, the group moved through various airfields in Transylvania encountering little resistance from Axis fighters and few missions were carried out due to weather conditions. On 14 December, it arrived at the Miskolc Airfield in Hungary, then moved to Lučenec in Czechoslovakia in February 1945. The last major offensive of the ARR during the war happened on 25 February 1945. During the attack aimed at Zvolen, Cpt. Cantacuzino and Adjutant (Adj.) Traian Dârjan engaged several German Fw 190F-8s. Cantacuzino managed to shoot one down, but the two airmen failed to spot a Bf 109 Rotte and Dârjan was shot down and killed in the dogfight, while Cantacuzino was shot down but managed to crash land. The same day, Adj. Constantin Nicoară scored the last confirmed ARR victory of the war over a Bf 109K-4. The number of missions increased over the next days as the weather improved, but there were no more encounters with the Luftwaffe. The group moved to Zvolen on 7 April, then to Badín on 13 April where it remained and continued to fly escort missions during the Prague offensive. On 9 May, the fighters protected IAR 39 aircraft on leaflet drop missions. The last mission of the 9th Fighter Group was flown on 11 May 1945 when bombers were escorted against remnants of the Vlasov Army.

== Organization 1942–1945 ==
The 9th Fighter Group had the following squadrons between 1942 and 1945:

- 47th Fighter Squadron
- 48th Fighter Squadron
- 52nd Fighter Squadron (non-permanent)
- 56th Fighter Squadron

== Bibliography ==
- Bernád, Dénes (20 June 2003). Rumanian Aces of World War 2. Osprey Publishing. ISBN 978-1-84176-535-8.
