= Pipera Airport =

Bucharest Pipera Airport Aeroportul Pipera București
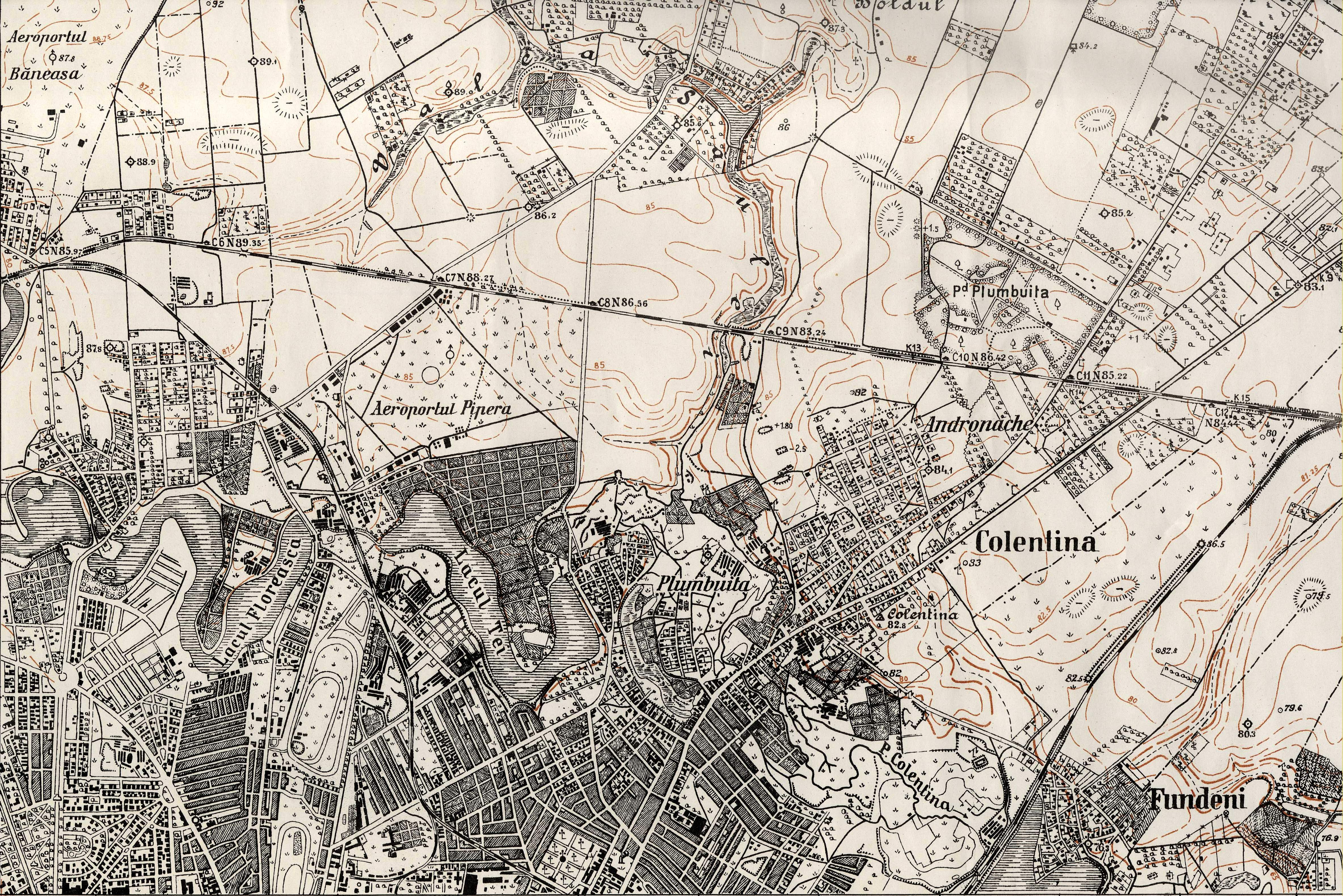
- This old map of northern Bucharest shows Pipera Airport slightly left of center
- IATA: none; ICAO: none

Summary
- Airport type: Defunct
- Serves: Bucharest
- Location: Pipera, Bucharest, Romania
- Opened: 1915
- Closed: 1958
- Coordinates: 44°28′41″N 026°06′40″E

Map
- Location within Romania

Bucharest Pipera Airfield was located in the Pipera neighborhood of Bucharest, Romania, at the northern edge of the city, right next to the town of Voluntari, Ilfov County. The airport no longer exists. A small military base, which also hosts the National Museum of Romanian Aviation, remains in the location where the airport used to be.

== History ==
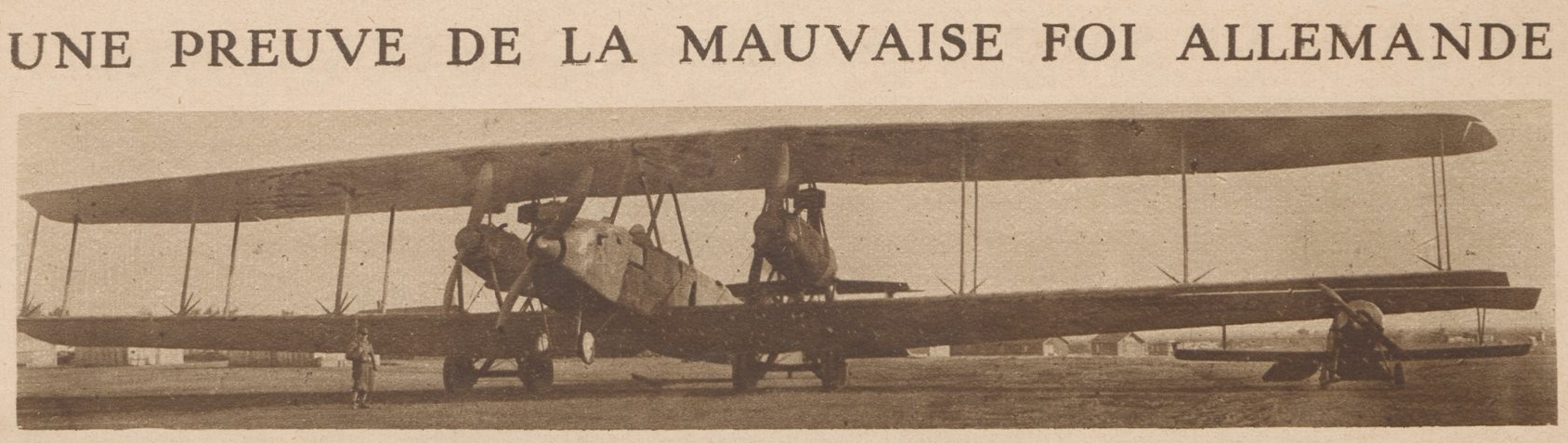
The Zeppelin-Staaken at the airfield from a Le Miroir article

The airfield was established in 1915. It was used by the Romanian Air Corps to continue the training of pilots who graduated from the Cotroceni Military Pilot School. In October 1919, a Zeppelin-Staaken R.XIVa which crash landed near Cristinești was brought to Pipera. The heavy bomber flew from Cristinești to the airfield with a stop in Adjud. It was used to train bomber pilots for several years.

In the interwar period, the airfield was used for civilian purposes as well. The first direct flight from Paris to Bucharest was done by the French–Romanian airline company CFRNA/CIDNA, with an airplane piloted by Albert Louis Deullin, who landed at Pipera Airport in October 1921.

During World War II, Pipera Airport was the main military airport in the Bucharest area, with the headquarters of the 1st Fighter Flotilla located there. Some units of the Royal Romanian Air Force units were flying IAR 80 fighters (built in Brașov), while a unit under the command of Mihail Romanescu was flying Messerschmitt Bf 109s from there. In the fall of 1940, Major Gotthard Handrick and a group German fighter pilots who had participated in the Battle of Britain were sent by Adolf Hitler to help train the Romanian pilots at this airbase. After Romania entered the war on the side of the Axis powers, pilots based at the Pipera airfield participated in the battles on the Eastern Front, including the Siege of Odessa and the Battle of Stalingrad. Until June 1942, the airport was used as an air base for the fighter units protecting Bucharest and Ploiești with various Luftwaffe units stationed there as well. By 1944, the airport infrastructure consisted of 13 hangars with adjacent workshops, eight of which featured paved aprons. The airport also had two dispersal areas with eight medium and ten small open blast bays.

In the spring of 1951, after the start of communist rule in Romania, aircraft repair facilities which had previously been located at the Cotroceni airfield were moved to Pipera. In a secret report from June 1953, the Central Intelligence Agency assessed the facilities at the Pipera airfield as being the second best in Romania after those at Stalin Airfield near Brașov (Stalin City at the time). The repair facility employed 250 civilian workers who serviced military aircraft.

The airport was dismantled in 1958. On its former site, the Aviation Museum of Bucharest was inaugurated on 18 March 2006. Some of the old hangars have been incorporated into the museum, while the runway has been replaced by the Dimitrie Pompeiu Road and an office building. A local police station is also located on the same grounds.

== Gallery ==
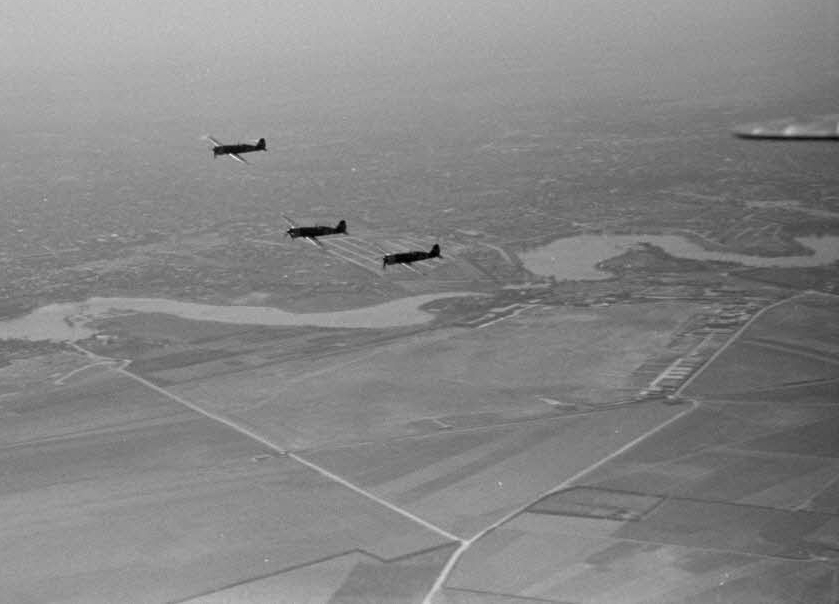
IAR 80s of Grupul 9 flying above the airport in 1942

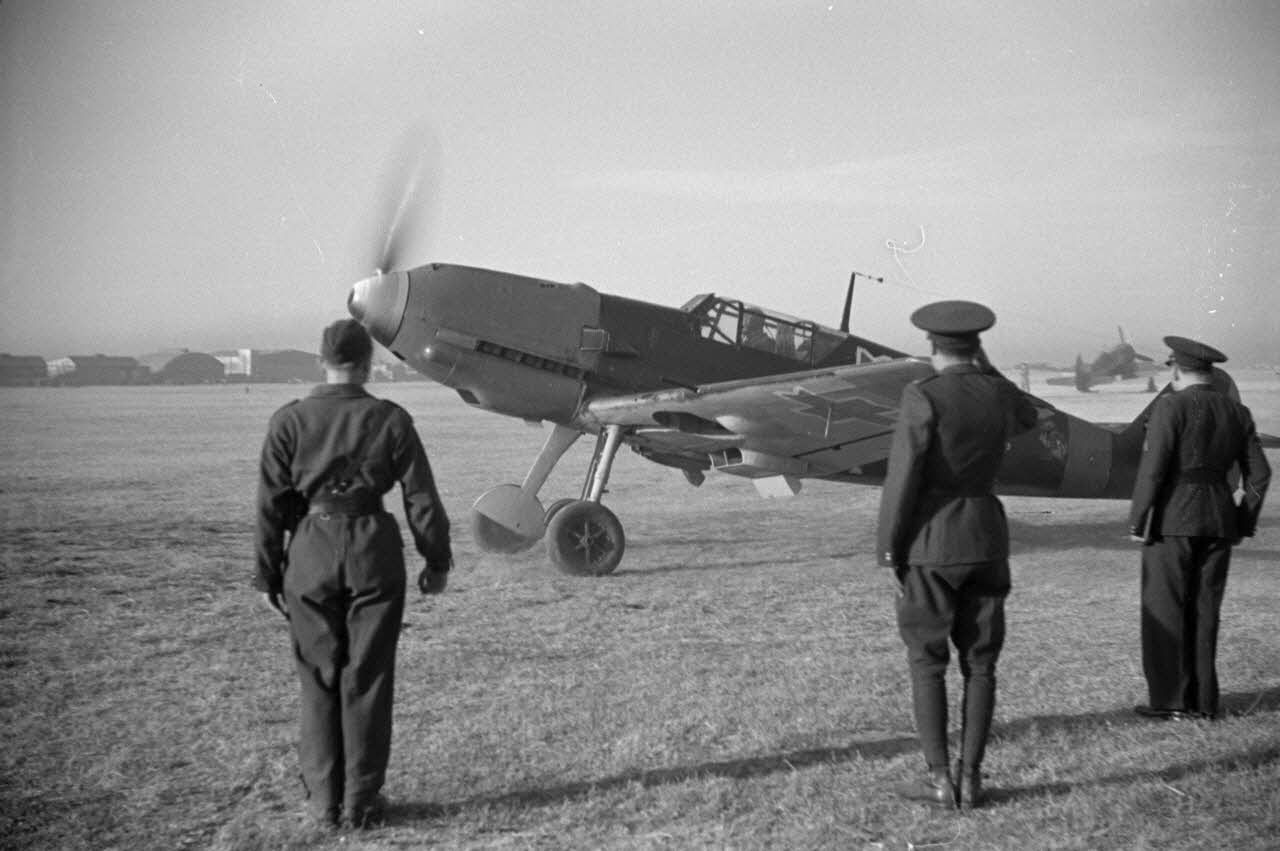
Bf 109 of Grupul 7 at Pipera in 1942

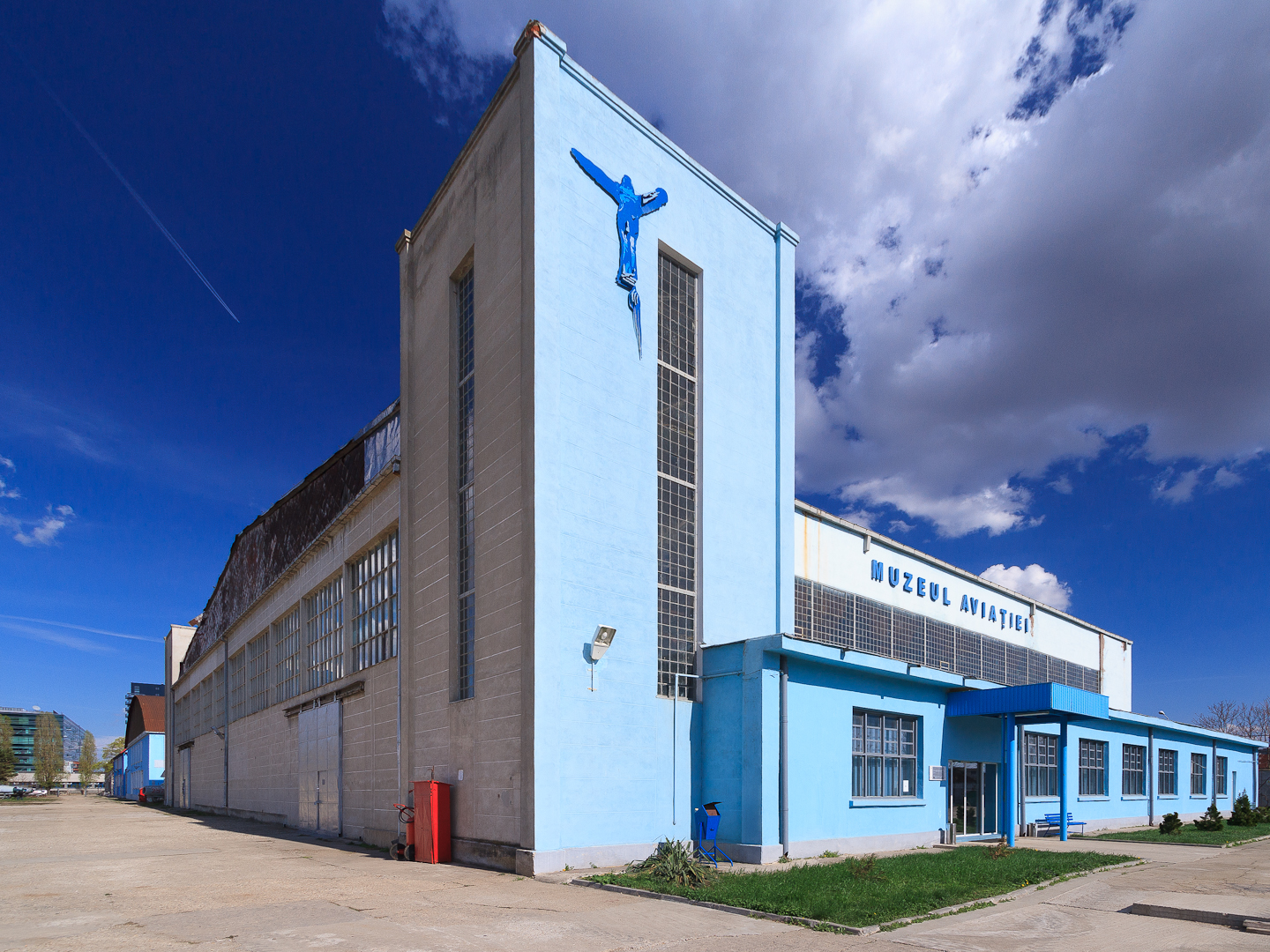
Hangar 1 of the aviation museum

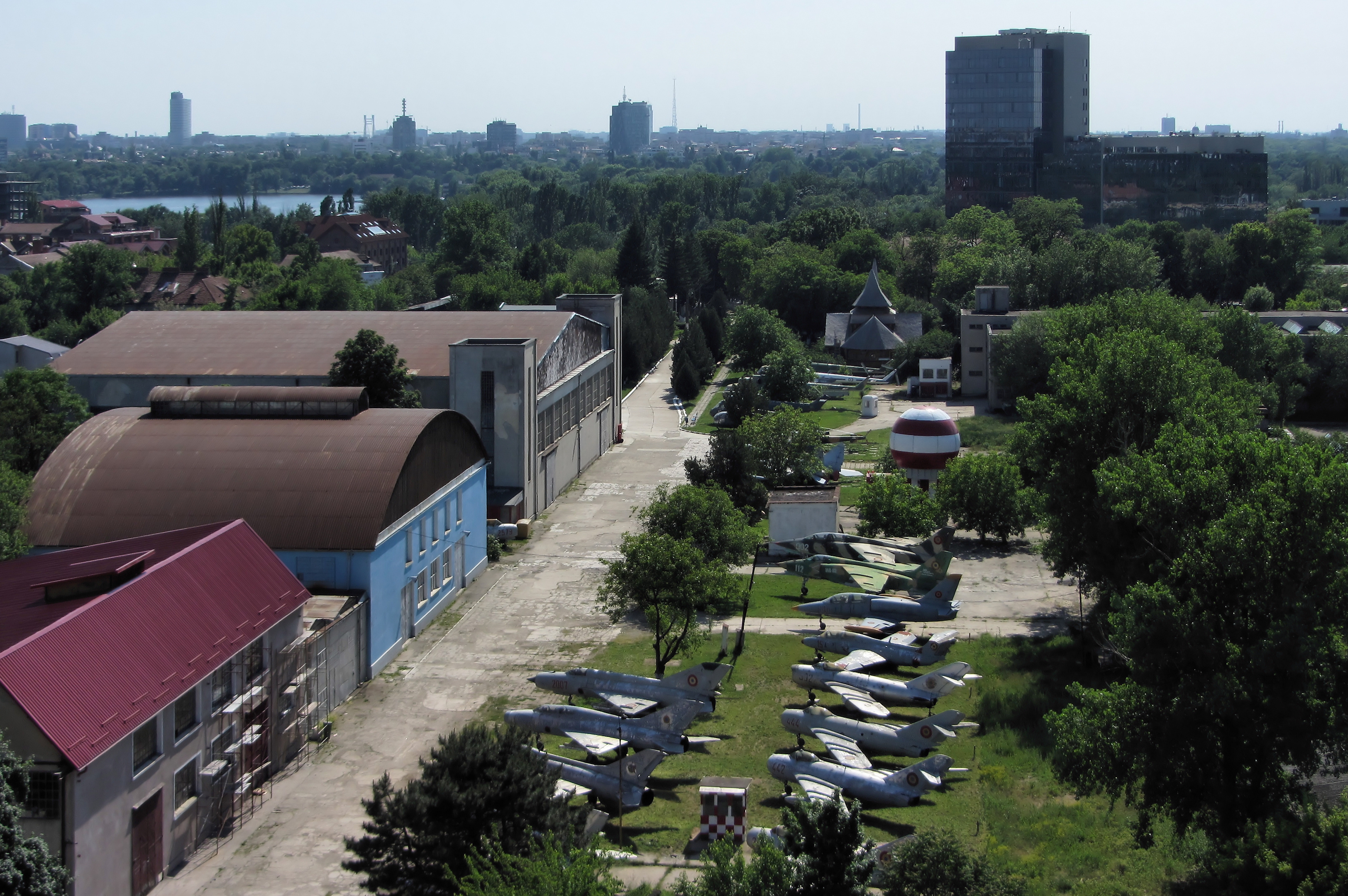
View of the two hangars

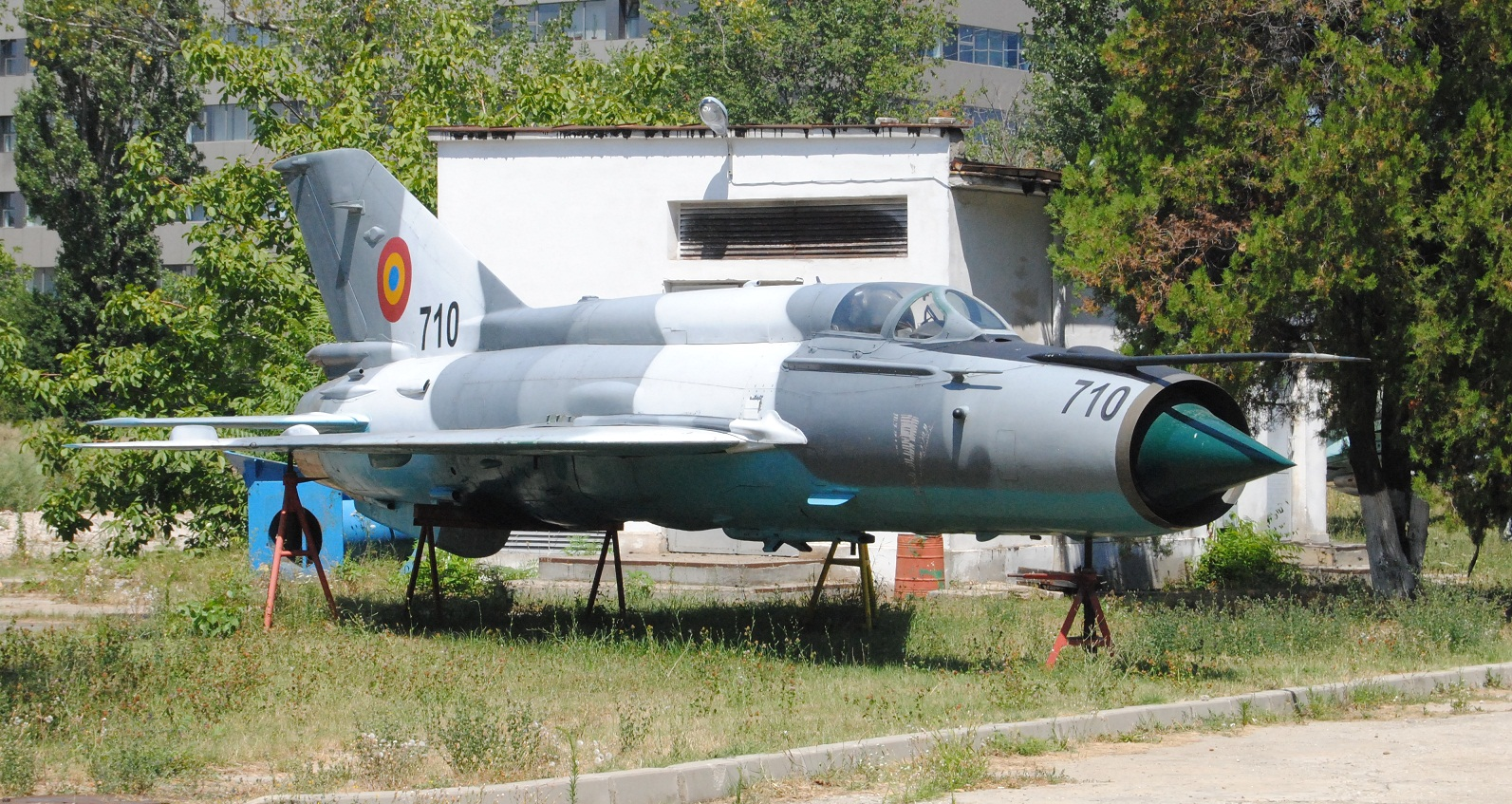
MiG-21 LanceR on display at the aviation museum

== See also ==
- Aviation in Romania
- Transport in Romania
