= Mius-Front =

Military front of World War II

The Mius-Front was a heavily fortified German Nazi defensive line along the Mius River in the Donbas region of the Ukrainian SSR, Soviet Union, during World War II.

It was created by the Germans in October 1941, under direction of General Paul Ludwig Ewald von Kleist. By the summer of 1943, the Mius-Front consisted of three defense lines with a total depth of 40–50 kilometres (25–31 mi).

== Fortifications ==
The main line of defense started off at Taganrog Bay on the coast of the Sea of Azov, to the east of the city Taganrog, then ran along the Mius River, which gave its name to the line.

The depth of the line of fortifications reached up to 11 kilometres (6.8 mi) in places. The defense area included some 800 Russian and Ukrainian settlements located within the line's long zone.

In order to build the fortification, rails from local mines, and wood taken from local homes and building was used. The Germans used local forced labor to build the positions.

=== Defense ===
The line was defended by pillboxes and bunkers, machine gun nests, and mobile artillery positions. The line also contained mine fields, trenches, tank traps, and barbed wire. The depth of the minefields zone was at least 200 metres (660 ft), and backed up by 20–30 pillboxes or bunkers per square kilometre (52–78/sq mi).

== Battles ==
Soviet troops twice tried to break through this line, first from December 1941 to July 1942, and then from February to August 1943.

By the summer of 1943, the Mius-Front consisted of three defense lines.

The Soviets finally succeeded penetrating the line in August 1943 during the Donbas Strategic Offensive, when troops of the Soviet Southern Front broke through it near the village of Kuybyshevo in Rostov Oblast.

== See also ==
- German World War II defensive lines
- World War II sites in Russia
