= 48th Fighter Squadron (Romania) =

- Escadrila 48 Vânătoare
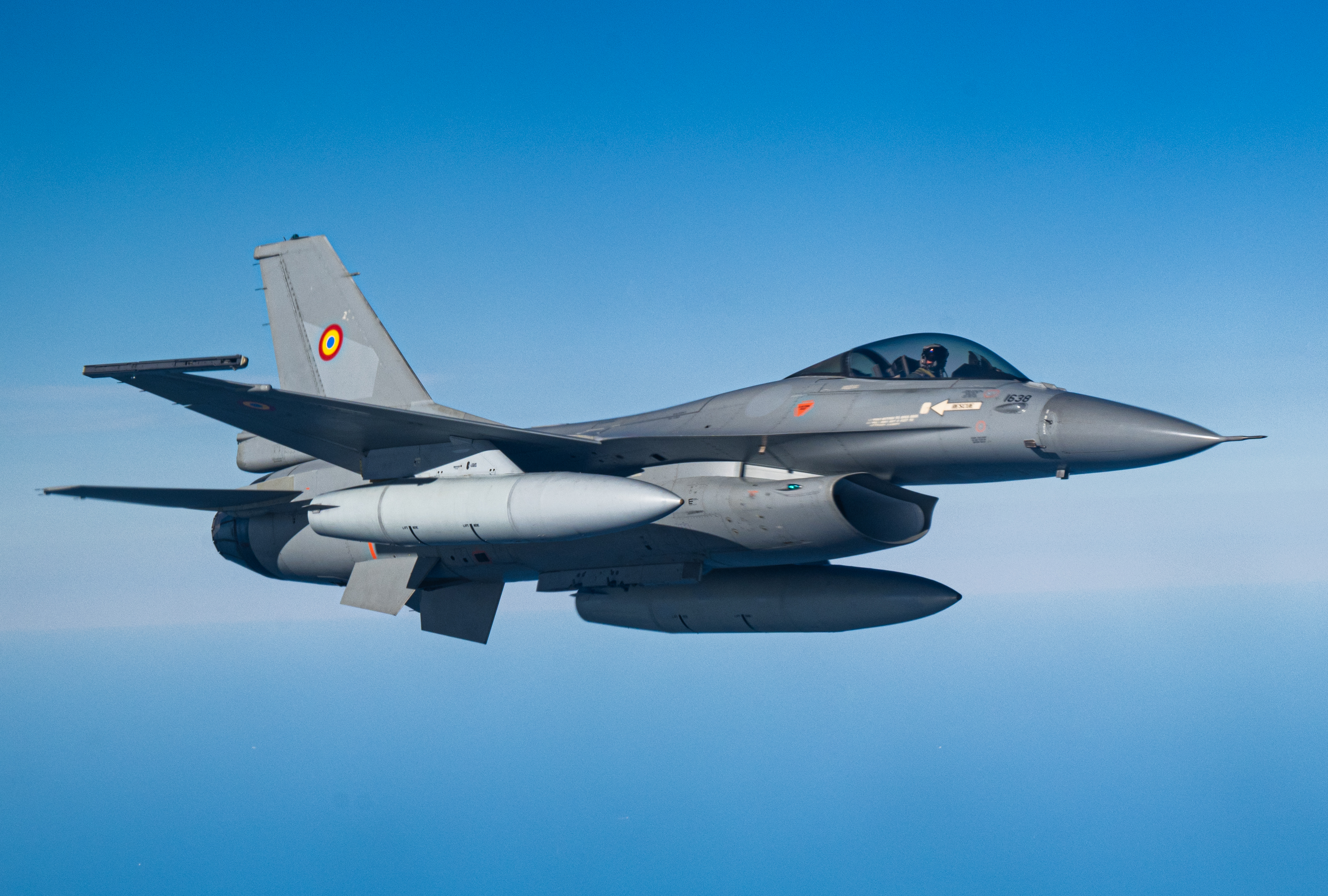
- F-16AM of Escadrila 48 Vânătoare conducting aerial refueling operations during exercise Ramstein Flag 25
- Active: 19 April 1942 – 1945; 30 June 1982 – 30 June 1986; 19 April 2024 – present
- Country: Romania
- Branch: Romanian Air Force; Royal Romanian Air Force
- Type: Squadron
- Role: Fighter
- Size: 16 F-16AM/BM (current)
- Garrison/HQ: RoAF 71st Air Base (Baza 71 Aeriană), Câmpia Turzii, Cluj County
- Nicknames: Sky Lords; Blue Section (during World War II)
- Motto: Cut them all
- Equipment: World War II: IAR 80; Heinkel He 112B; Messerschmitt Bf 109G; Present: F-16AM/BM Block 15 MLU
- Engagements: Second World War: Eastern Front; Western Allied campaign in Romania

Commanders
- Current commander: Comandor Alin "Pishta" Cachiț
- Notable commanders: Ion Dobran

Insignia
- 48th Fighter Squadron badge

The 48th Fighter Squadron (Romanian: Escadrila 48 Vânătoare) is a Romanian Air Force fighter squadron operating the F-16AM/BM fighter aircraft delivered from Norway in 2024. The squadron was first formed on 19 April 1942, then reactivated on 30 June 1982, becoming the 71st Fighter Bombardment Aviation Regiment four years later. It is currently based at the 71st Air Base in Câmpia Turzii.

== History ==
=== World War II ===
The 48th Fighter Squadron was formed on 19 April 1942 within the Grupul 9 Vânătoare (9th Fighter Group) of the Flotila 1 Vânătoare (1st Fighter Flotilla). Under the command of Lieutenant (Lt.) Ion Bozero, the airmen of the 48th Squadron together with the 47th Fighter Squadron converted to the IAR 80 after training on Fleet 10 and Nardi FN.305 aircraft. In February 1943, the group squadrons further converted to the He 112B and were moved to the Tiraspol airfield from Pipera. Conversion to the Bf 109 started on 4 April with German aviator Helmut Lipfert as instructor. On 23 October, the squadron equipped with the new Bf 109G was moved to Henichesk and the first victories were registered on the same day. Continued bomber escort, ground attack missions, and dogfights followed with Lt. Bozero being awarded the Order of the Crown of Romania for shooting down a Soviet aircraft in an air battle.

Also in 1943, the command of the squadron was handed over to Ion Dobran, and the squadron also received the designation "Blue Section" (Secțiunea Albastră). In 1944, the squadron was moved to Mykolaiv and executed 197 sorties, with 12 dogfights, achieving 11 aerial victories during February. In April, the 9th Fighter Group was relocated to Tecuci and continued with missions against both the Soviets and Americans. On 22 July, the 48th Squadron along with the other two squadrons of the 9th Group were scrambled to engage American P-38 and P-51 fighters flying towards Bucharest and continuing to the USSR. The Romanian pilots ambushed the American P-38s and shot down six in the engagement. On 26 July when the American force was returning from the USSR as part of their shuttle bombing raid, the Romanian Group lost seven Messerschmitts to the escorting fighters, but managed to shoot down 11 enemy fighters.

After the 23 August 1944 coup, the airmen of Grupul 9 engaged the Luftwaffe aircraft which were attacking the capital. In the air battles, Lt. Dobran shot down an He 111 bomber. Other victories of the Group included two Me 323 Gigant, Ju 52s, Bf 109s and Bf 110s as well as a further four probable victories.

On 15 September, the squadrons of the 9th Fighter Group conducted a low-level attack on the Someșeni airfield near Cluj. The attack was a success, with five aircraft, of which one Hungarian MÁVAG Héja set on fire by Lt. Dobran, and several trucks destroyed on the ground.

In the following months, most missions were flown in support of bombers and the ground troops, with very few air battles happening between the end of 1944 and 1945. The last mission of the 48th Squadron and the 9th Group was flown on 11 May 1945 against remnants of the Vlasov Army in Czechoslovakia.

=== Cold War ===
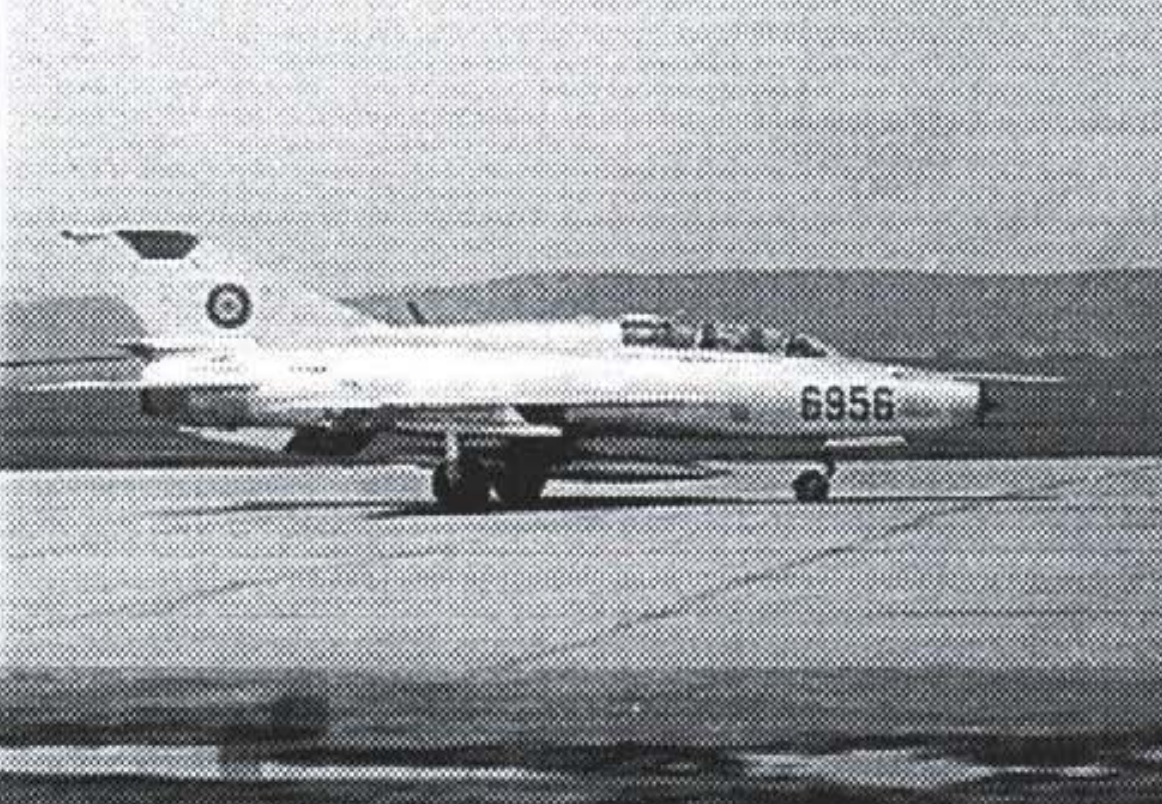
The first MiG-21 at Câmpia Turzii

In 1982, the 376th Command of Câmpia Turzii Airfield became part of the 48th Fighter Aviation Squadron (Escadrila 48 Aviație Vânătoare) of the 91st Fighter Aviation Regiment from Deveselu. On 30 June 1982, the 48th Squadron received the status of military unit (Military Unit 01980) and was to remain at Deveselu until the base at Câmpia Turzii was completed. On 30 June 1986, Escadrila 48 was moved to Câmpia Turzii and transformed into the 71st Fighter Bombardment Aviation Regiment. A year later, the new unit received its first MiG-21 fighters.

=== Present Day ===
On 19 April 2024, with the arrival of the first F-16s purchased from the Royal Norwegian Air Force, the 48th Fighter Squadron was re-established at Câmpia Turzii. After the completed delivery of 16 F-16s, the squadron is expected to become operational in 2025. The last F-16 of the squadron was delivered on 30 January 2025.

The first international deployment of the squadron happened on 26 March 2025 when three F-16s were sent to RAF Fairford to participate in the Ramstein Flag 25 exercise. The major exercise, similar to Red Flag, was held between 31 March and 11 April.

== Bibliography ==
- Bernád, Dénes (20 June 2003). Rumanian Aces of World War 2. Osprey Publishing. ISBN 978-1-84176-535-8.
