= RoAF 71st Air Base =

Air base in Romania

RoAF 71st Air Base
- Baza 71 Aeriană "General Emanoil Ionescu"
- Luna, Cluj County; Near Câmpia Turzii in Romania
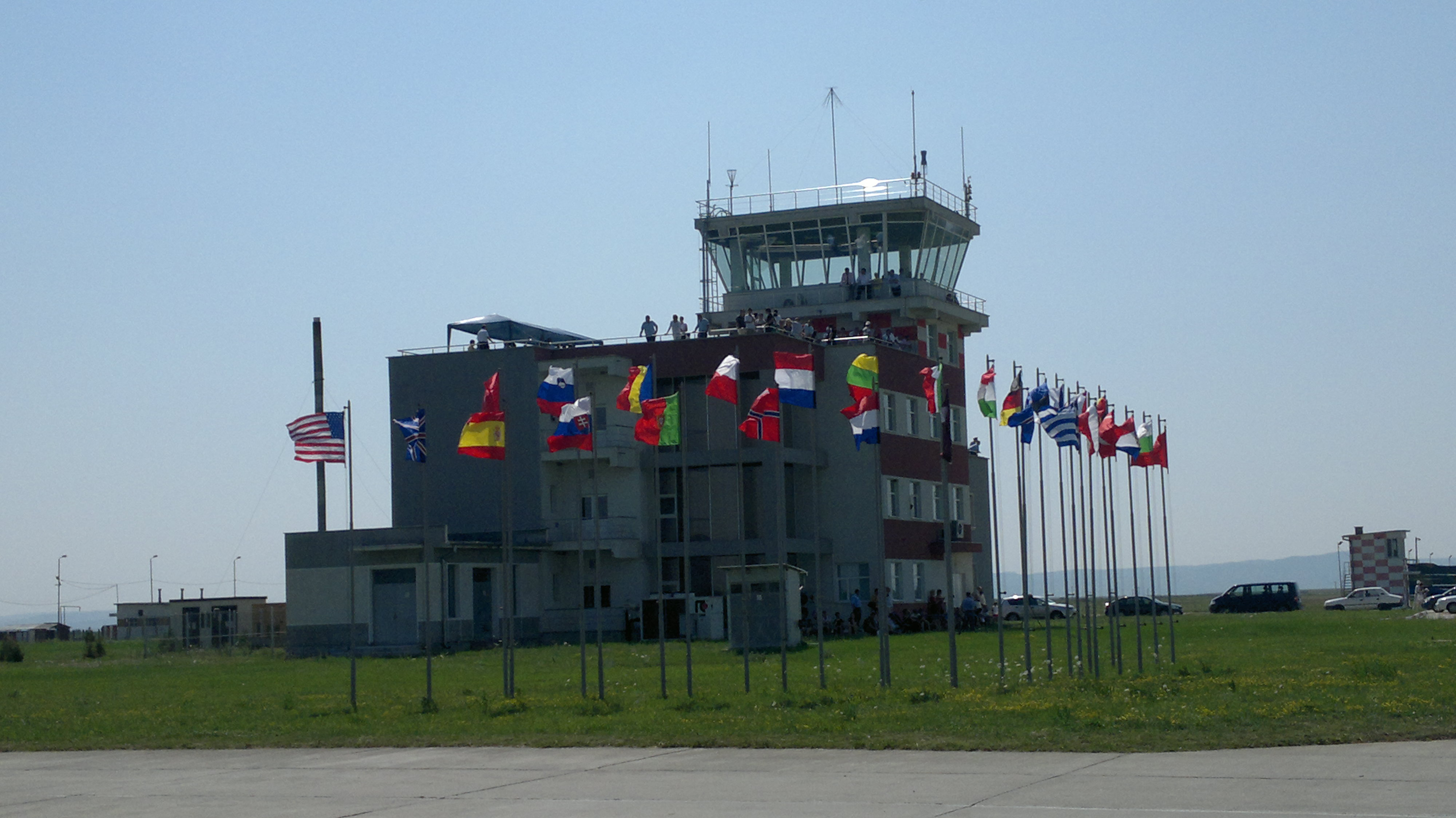
- The Control Tower building at the 71st Air Base

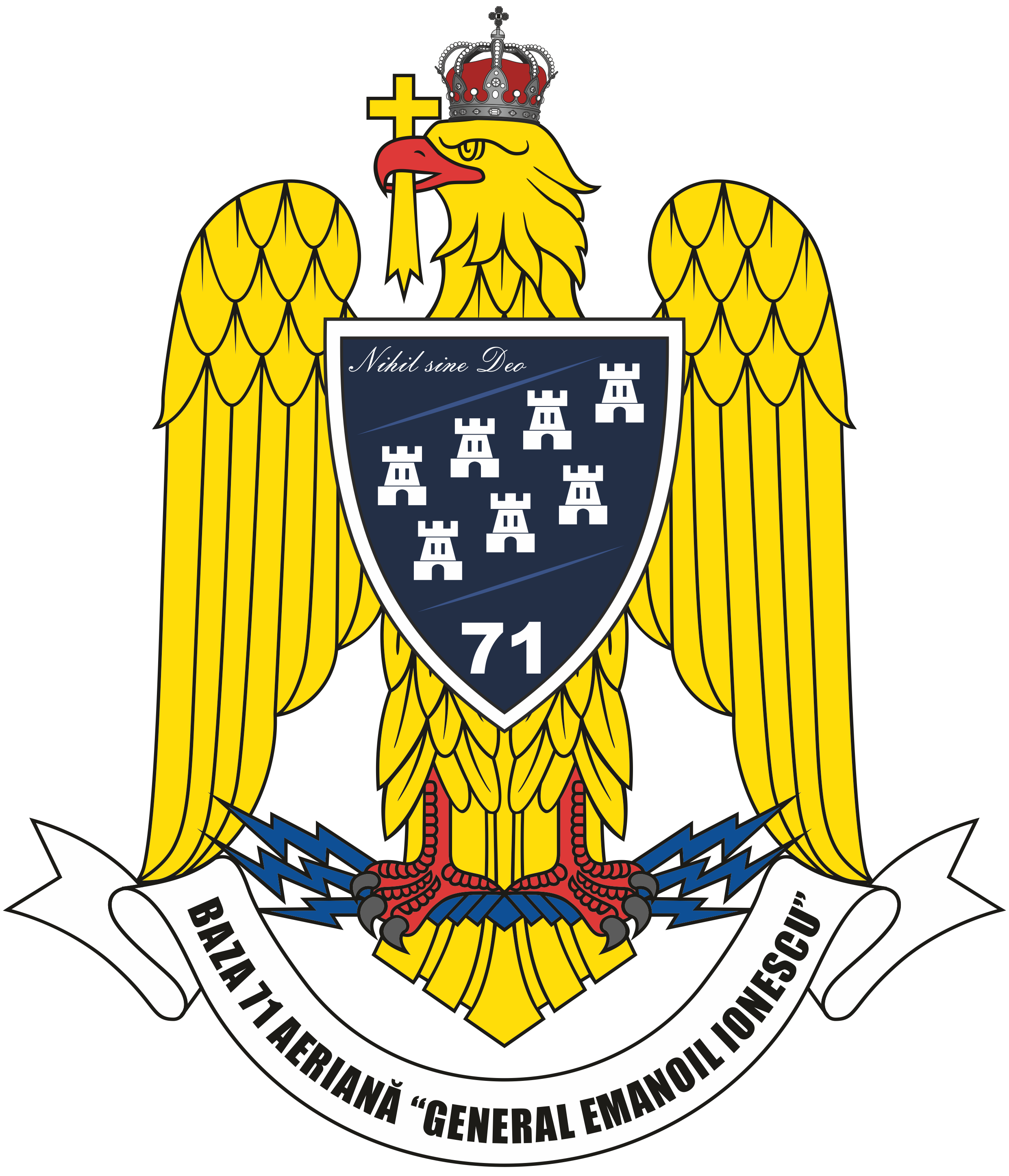
- Coat of arms of the 71st Air Base

Site information
- Owner: Ministry of National Defence
- Operator: Romanian Air Force

Location
- Location within Romania Location within Europe
- Coordinates: 46.5023°N 23.8859°E

Site history
- Built: 1952
- In use: 1953 – Present

Garrison information
- Current commander: General de flotilă aeriană Cătălin "Miki" Micloș
- Occupants: 48th Fighter Squadron; 58th Fighter Squadron; 713th Helicopter Squadron; United States Air Force: 731st Expeditionary Attack Squadron; Royal Netherlands Air and Space Force: No. 306 Squadron

Airfield information
- Identifiers: ICAO: LRCT
- Elevation: 324 metres (1,063 ft) AMSL
Runways
Direction	Length and surface
15/33	2,500 metres (8,202 ft) Concrete

The Romanian Air Force 71st Air Base "General Emanoil Ionescu" (Romanian: Baza 71 Aeriană "General Emanoil Ionescu"), also known as Câmpia Turzii Air Base, is located in the commune Luna near the city of Câmpia Turzii, in Cluj County. The 71st Air Base was founded on 1 June 2002 from the previous 71st Fighter and Bombardment Base, according to the Romanian Armed Forces reorganization program. It is named after Emanoil Ionescu, a general who commanded the 1st Air Corps of the Royal Romanian Air Force during World War II.

The base is home to the 48th Fighter Squadron, operating F-16 Fighting Falcon fighters, and the 713th Helicopter Squadron, operating IAR 330 helicopters, while also hosting the 58th Fighter Squadron of the 57th Air Base until its base upgrades are completed. The 712th Helicopter Squadron is located at the Giarmata Airport. The base also hosts MQ-9 Reaper drones of the United States Air Force 31st Operations Group, maintained by the 731st Expeditionary Attack Squadron and operated remotely by the 25th Attack Group. Another two Reapers belonging to the Royal Netherlands Air Force No. 306 Squadron are also deployed at the base.

The current base commander is General de flotilă aeriană Cătălin "Miki" Micloș.

== History ==
=== Origins to 1982 ===
The location of the base was used during World War II for air operations in the Aiud–Turda–Cluj area. In 1952, a concrete runway began to be built with the aim of basing Soviet-made Ilyushin Il-10 attack aircraft there. In the summer of the same year, the 167th Assault Aviation Regiment was deployed at the base, which offered a firing range. Until 1958-1959, the base was mainly used as a reserve airfield for the MiG-15 fighters of the aviation unit from Craiova.

In 1969, an air defence unit was created on the airfield in order to provide protection against air attacks. A paratrooper regiment was also founded and assigned to the Câmpia Turzii base in 1980. In 1971, the 376th Airfield Command was formed with the task of maintaining the airfield and executing missions of particular importance. This Airfield Command became part of the 48th Fighter Aviation Squadron from the 91st Fighter Aviation Regiment which was stationed at the Deveselu base.

=== 1982–present ===
On 30 June 1982, the 48th Squadron became a standing military unit based in Deveselu until the capabilities of carrying out missions from the Câmpia Turzii base were achieved. In 1986, the 48th Fighter Aviation Squadron became the 71st Fighter Bombardment Regiment. In 1987, when the air base finally became fully operational, the 71st Regiment was moved to Câmpia Turzii and started operating MiG-21 fighters. Between 1988 and 1990, the 71st Regiment was moved to Târgu Mureș while some infrastructure works were carried out at Câmpia Turzii. According to the restructuring plan of the Air Force, the 71st Fighter and Bombardment Base with the 71st Fighter Aviation Group were formed at the Câmpia Turzii in 1995. On 24 January 2001 the unit received the first modernized MiG-21 LanceR fighters, which carried Matra Magic 2 missiles.

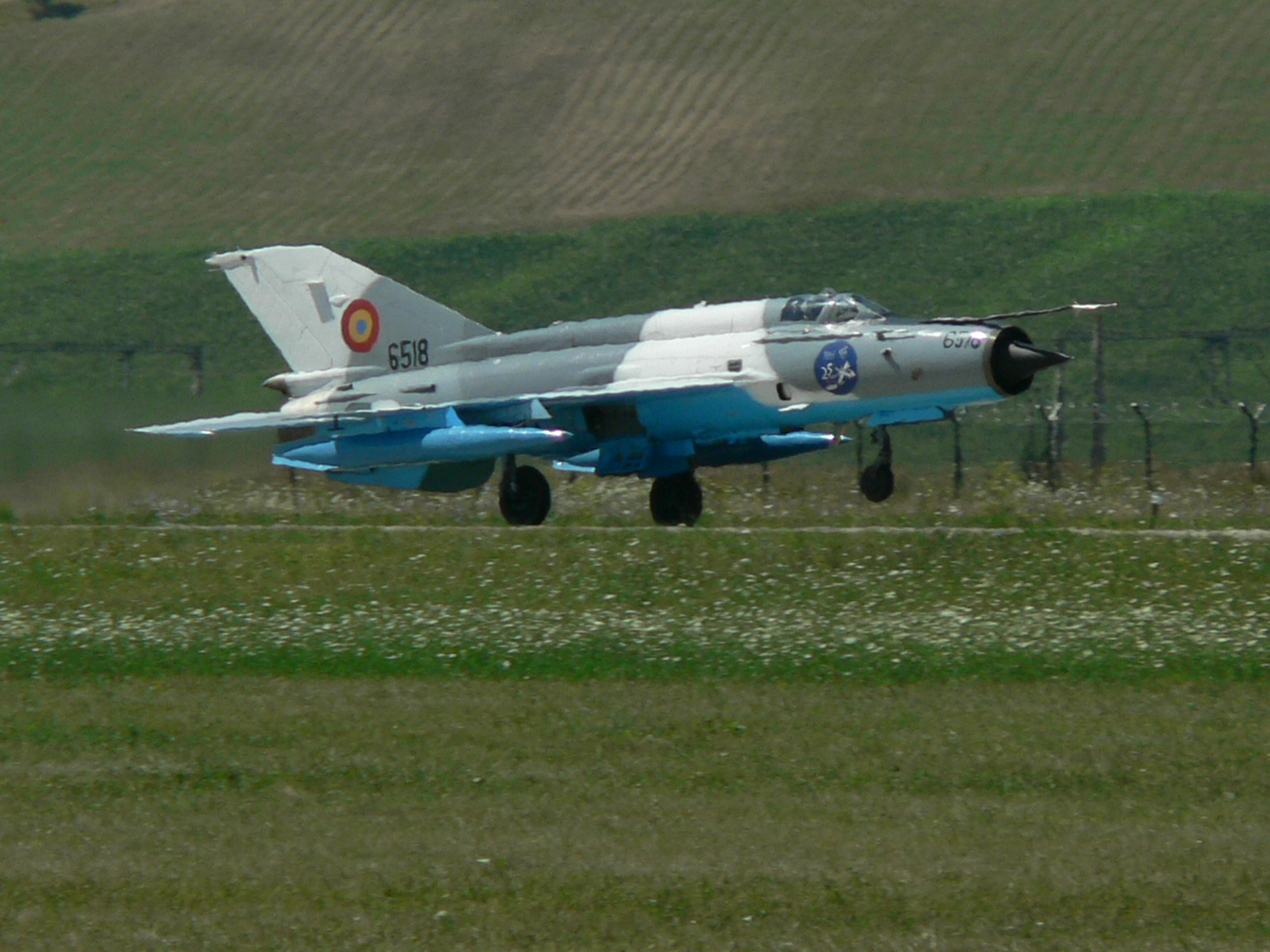
MiG-21 LanceR-C taking off from the base in 2008

On 1 June 2002, according to a Romanian Armed Forces reorganization and modernization program, the 71st Fighter and Bombardment Base was merged with the 71st Fighter Aviation Group, the 401st Anti-Aircraft Divizion, and the Radiolocation battalions and companies, to form the 71st Air Base. At the same time, the 58th Helicopter Group from Sibiu was transformed into a squadron and assigned to the 71st Air Base. During late 2004, the RoAF 93rd Air Base was disbanded and its helicopter units were relocated at the 71st base. Since then, the 71st Air Base participated in a large number of national/multinational military exercises and training missions. Also, it often participated in various humanitarian missions, in cooperation with other Romanian Government institutions. Between 2010 and 2013, the 71st Air Base was organized as the 71st Air Flotilla.

The William M. (Mac) Thornberry National Defense Authorization Act for Fiscal Year 2021 included $130.5 million to renovate Câmpia Turzii Air Base, in order to enhance the United States' ability to use it to for operations in the Black Sea region. On 15 May 2023, the MiG-21s were retired. A retirement ceremony was held at the base, after which the aircraft were flown to Bacău for storage. On 19 September 2023, the construction of new parking aprons, a hangar, and the Squadron Operations Facility, worth $34 million were completed.

With the purchase of F-16s from the Royal Norwegian Air Force, a new squadron, the 48th Fighter Squadron (Escadrila 48 Vânătoare), was activated at the base. The first three F-16s arrived at the base on 19 April 2024, while another three F-16s previously arrived at the 86th Air Base.

On 1 October 2024, the decision was approved by the Romanian Parliament for the Romanian military to participate in the NATO Security Assistance and Training for Ukraine. As part of this decision, the 71st Air Base will host a logistic point, the Logistic Enabling Node - Romania, with up to 100 military personnel.

In January 2025, it was announced that the first phase of the expansion and modernization works of the base was completed. The works are aimed at improving and expanding the infrastructure of the base and preparing for the reception of the first Romanian F-35 Lightnings around 2030.

Starting in May 2025, the F-16 aircraft of the 58th Fighter Squadron began arriving at the base. The squadron is to remain at Câmpia Turzii Air Base until the modernization works are completed at Mihail Kogălniceanu.

=== 2007 Baltic Air Policing ===
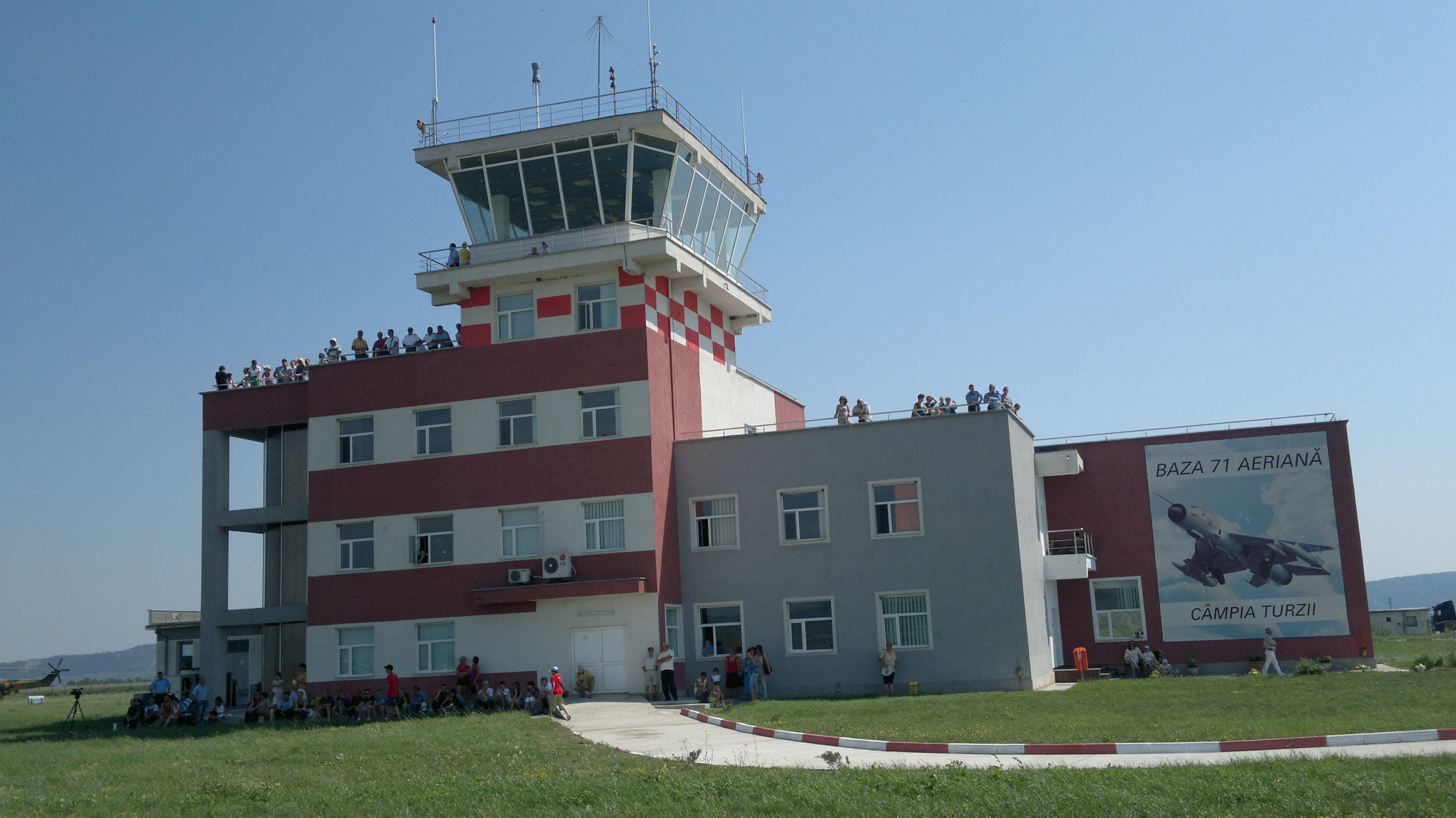
Front view of the Control Tower

Four MiG-21 LanceR Cs belonging to 71st Air Base were deployed from August 2007 to November 2007 at Šiauliai, in Lithuania for Baltic Air Policing. The Romanian detachment succeeds the French Air Force Mirage 2000Cs of Escadron de Chasse 01.012 from Cambrai, which fulfilled the Baltic Air Policing since May 2007. Once the RoAF finish its three-month stint, a Portuguese Air Force detachment will take over the mission.

The four aircraft and a total of 67 personnel, among them nine pilots, are part of the detachment: 63 serve at Šiauliai, while other four serve at the air traffic control centre in Kaunas, to ensure smooth cooperation with local authorities. The Romanian detachment has attracted huge attention from the local media, not least from the fact that it is only the second time a fighter from the Soviet era has deployed to Šiauliai; Polish Air Force MiG-29s have also been deployed there in 2006. The RoAF will most probably perform again Baltic Air Policing in future.

== Foreign deployments ==
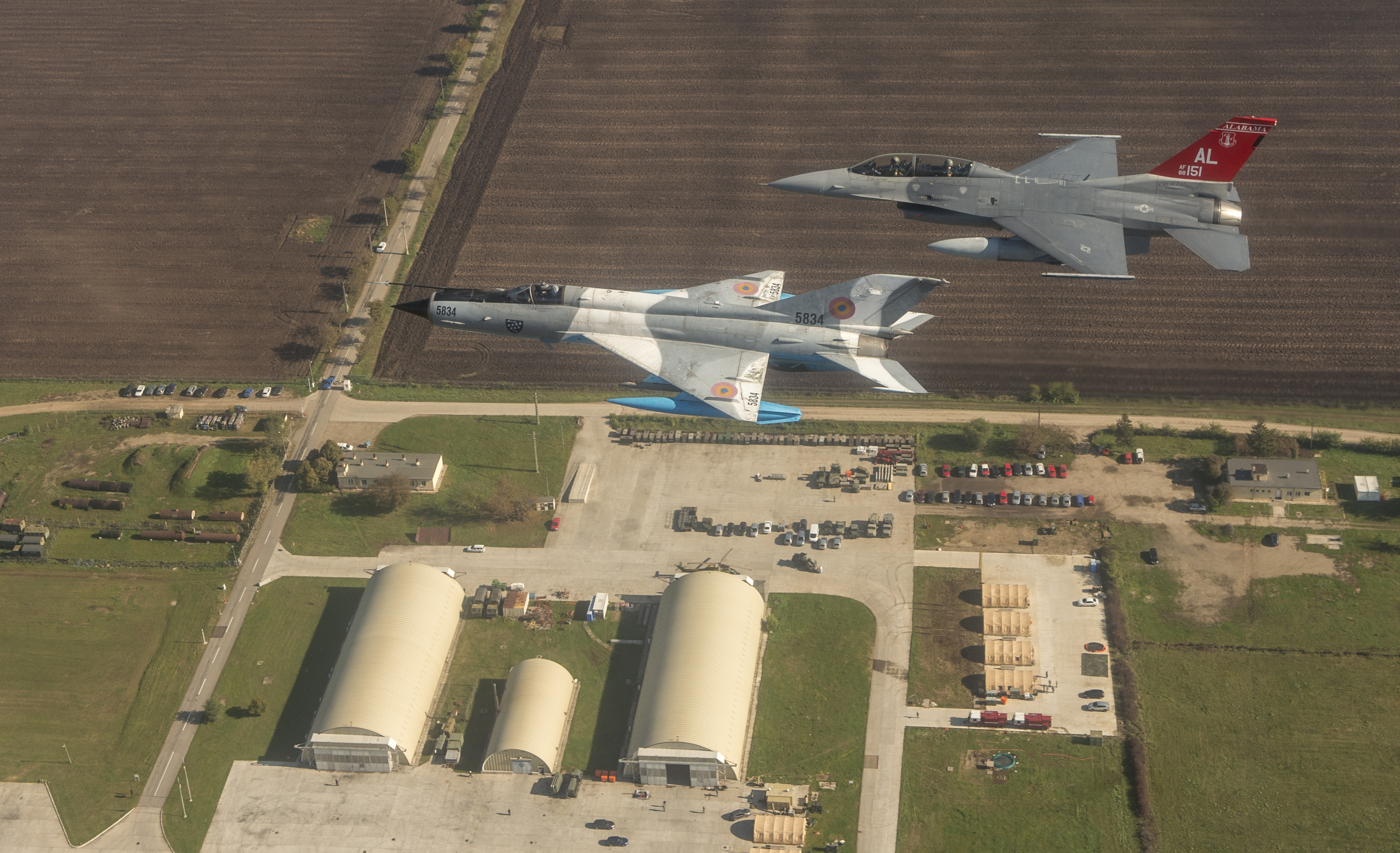
An F-16 of the 100th Fighter Squadron and a MiG-21 LanceR flying over the air base in 2015

In 2012, an Alabama Air National Guard contingent composed of eight F-16 fighters and nearly twenty fighter pilots of the 100th Fighter Squadron was deployed at the base to participate in the three-week "Dacian Viper 2012" exercise. The contingent exercised with approximately 200 Romanian soldiers, technical staff, and pilots flying six MiG-21 LanceRs. The 100th Fighter Squadron was deployed at the base again in 2015 for exercise "Dacian Viper 2015".

A Royal Canadian Air Force detachment of 6 x McDonnell Douglas CF-18 Hornets from 425 Tactical Fighter Squadron was based here between 5 May and 22 August 2014. The detachment participated in NATO's enhanced Air Policing mission over Romania under the Canadian Operation Reassurance. After finishing their deployment, the Canadian Hornets were moved to Šiauliai Air Base for Baltic Air Policing duties.

In March 2015, an advance group of four A-10s of the U.S. Air Force arrived to take part in an exercise. The “Dacian Thunder 2015” operation, held between 27 March and 7 July 2015, involved 350 Airmen and 12 A-10s.

In 2019, the first MQ-9 Reapers of the US Air Force were deployed at the base. These drones were operated by the 52nd Expeditionary Operations Group, Detachment 2 based at Mirosławiec in Poland. In 2020, they participated in the "Dacian Reaper-20" exercise.

In February 2021, the US Air Force deployed approximately 90 airmen and several MQ-9 drones of the 31st Expeditionary Operations Group, Detachment 1 at the base. The Reapers started flying remote-split operations on 1 February. The drones are managed by the newly activated 731st Expeditionary Attack Squadron while air operations are handled by the 25th Attack Group, located at the Shaw Air Force Base, South Carolina. The group is subordinated to the 432nd Air Expeditionary Wing. On 14 July 2022, one of the drones crashed in a cornfield south of the base, while conducting a training mission.

Also in 2021, the US began participating in the enhanced Air Policing mission in Romania by deploying F-15 fighters of the 336th Fighter Squadron to the air base.

In October 2023, the Dutch Ministry of Defence announced that it will send MQ-9 Reaper drones to Romania with the task of monitoring the eastern flank of the Alliance. The three drones belonging to the 306 Squadron were redeployed from the Curaçao International Airport in the Caribbean and arrived at Câmpia Turzii in early 2024. The Dutch drones are operated remotely from the Leeuwarden Air Base, and their operational testing was concluded in March. It was announced in February 2025 that two Dutch drones will continue the deployment to Romania for one more year until 31 March 2026. In February 2026, it was decided to extend the deployment further until the end of September 2026. The deployment was then further extended to 31 December 2027.

=== 2008 Bucharest summit ===
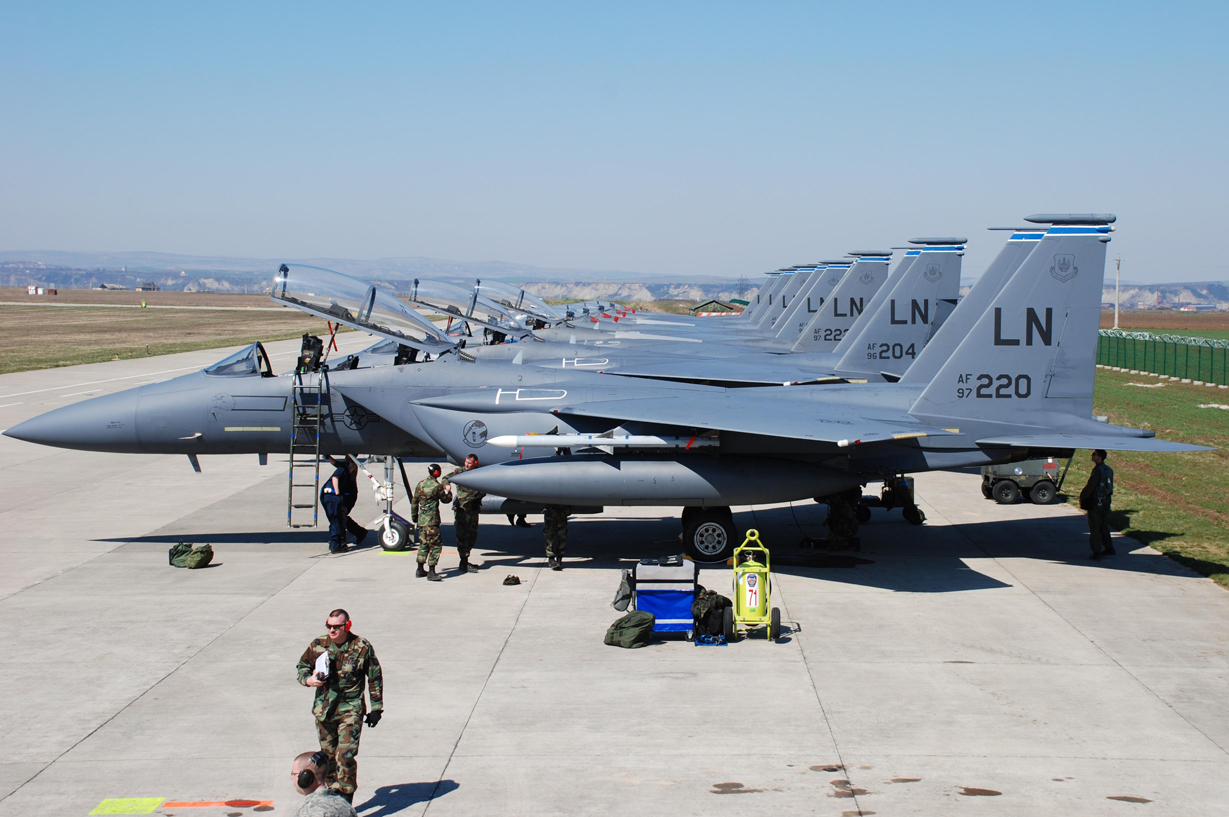
F-15E Strike Eagles lined up at the base in 2008

Twelve United States Air Force McDonnell Douglas F-15E Strike Eagle fighters and more than 150 aviators of the 492nd Fighter Squadron were deployed from 27 March to 6 April 2008, in order to provide air policing together with the Romanian Air Force fighters during the NATO 2008 Bucharest Summit held at Bucharest. These fighters were assisted by Boeing KC-135 Stratotankers located at the Budapest Airport in Hungary. Under the code-name Operation Noble Endeavor, the Romanian-led effort supported by the 323d Air Expeditionary Wing directed the USAF deployment of KC-135 Stratotankers, F-15C and F-15E Strike Eagles, E-3 Sentries, and F-16 Fighting Falcons.

== Based units ==
The following flying and non-flying units are located at Câmpia Turzii.

=== Romanian Air Force ===
Air Force General Staff

- 71st Air Base Command
  - 71st Air Operations Center
  - 71st Operational Group
    - 48th Fighter Squadron
    - 58th Fighter Squadron
    - 713th Combat Helicopter Squadron
  - 71st Force Protection Group
    - 715th Anti-Aircraft Artillery Battalion
    - 717th Military Police Company
  - 71st Support Group
    - 716th Air Communications and Air Navigation Technical Systems Company
    - Service Platoon

=== Royal Netherlands Air Force ===
Air Combat Command (ACC)

- Leeuwarden Air Base
  - 306 Squadron

=== United States Air Force ===
United States Air Forces in Europe – Air Forces Africa (USAFE-AFAFRICA)

- Third Air Force
  - 31st Fighter Wing
    - 31st Operations Group
      - 731st Expeditionary Attack Squadron

== Decorations ==
The 71st Air Base has received the following decorations:

- Order of Aeronautical Virtue, Peacetime (Knight – 2014)

== Gallery ==
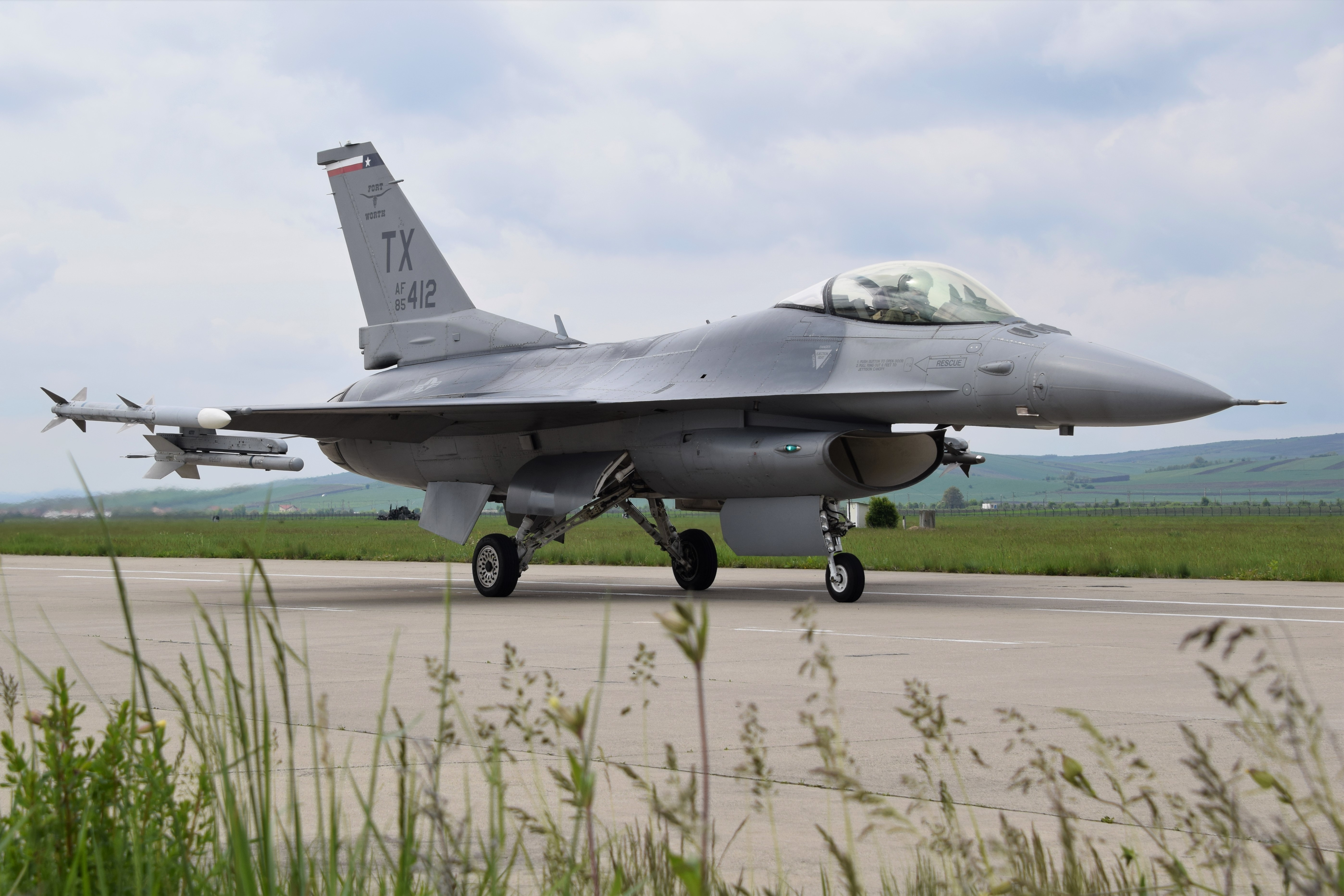
F-16C Fighting Falcon of the 457th Fighter Squadron at the base in 2019

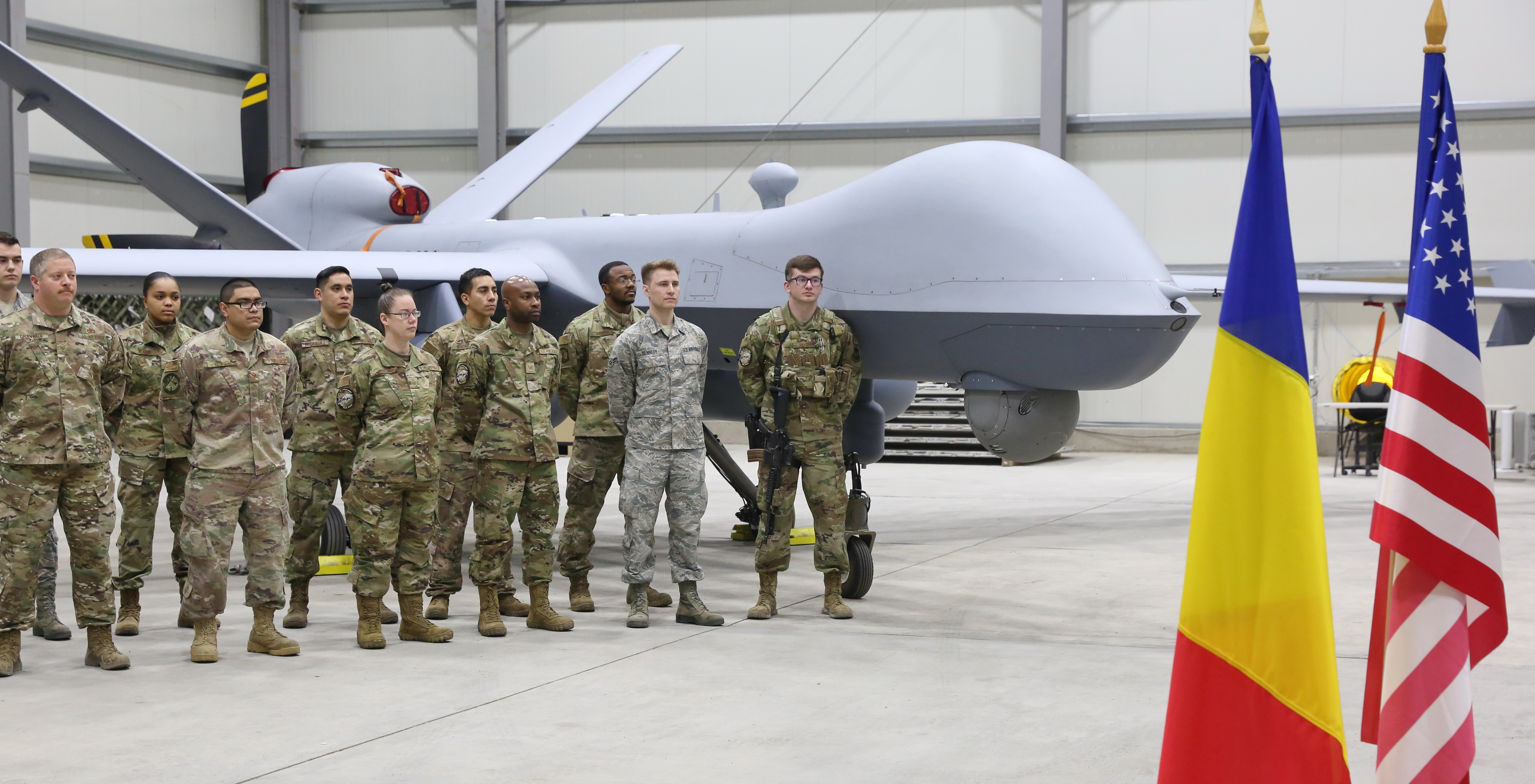
MQ-9 Reaper deployed at the base during the Dacian Reaper-20 exercise

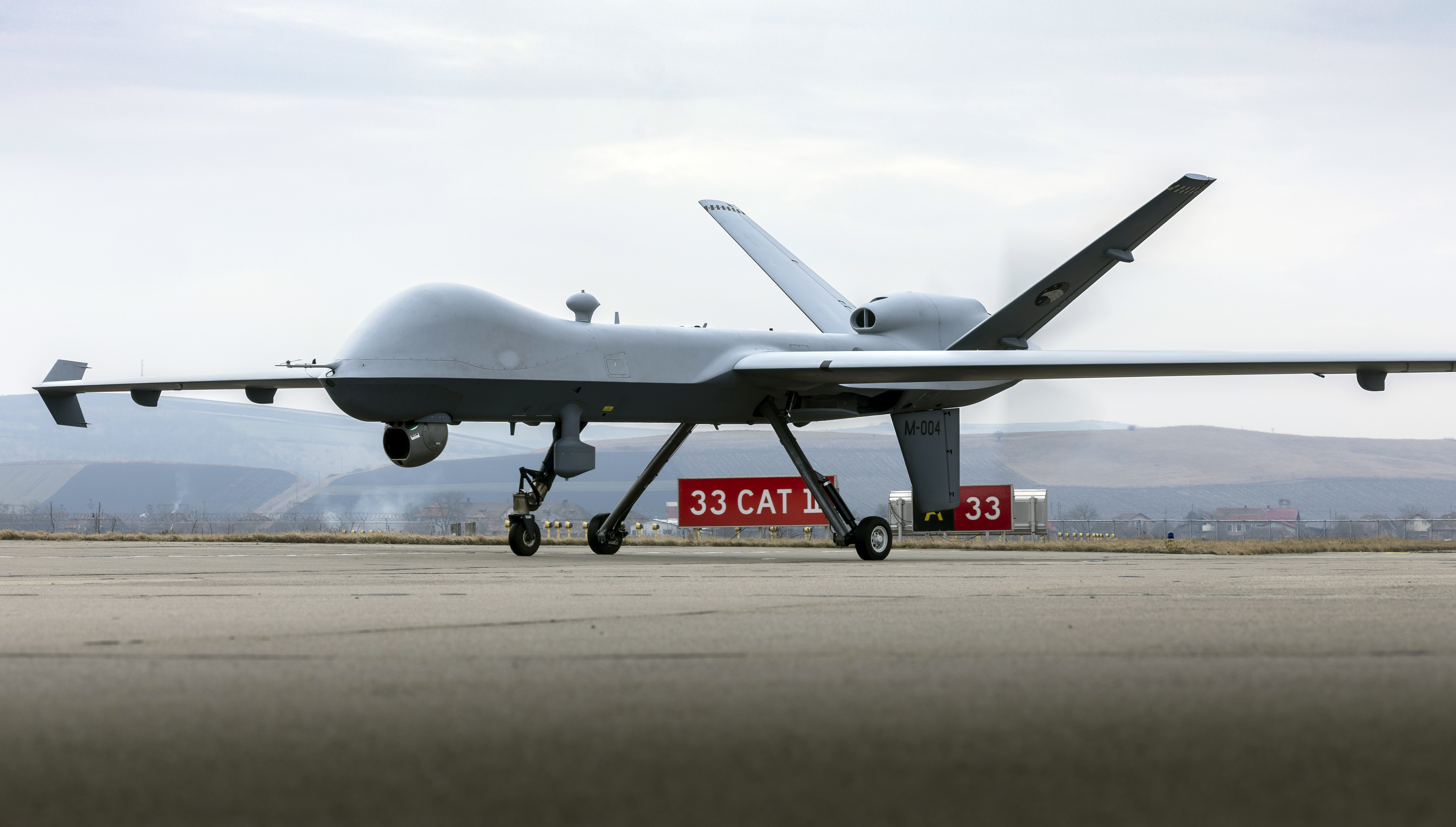
Dutch MQ-9 Reaper at Câmpia Turzii, February 2024

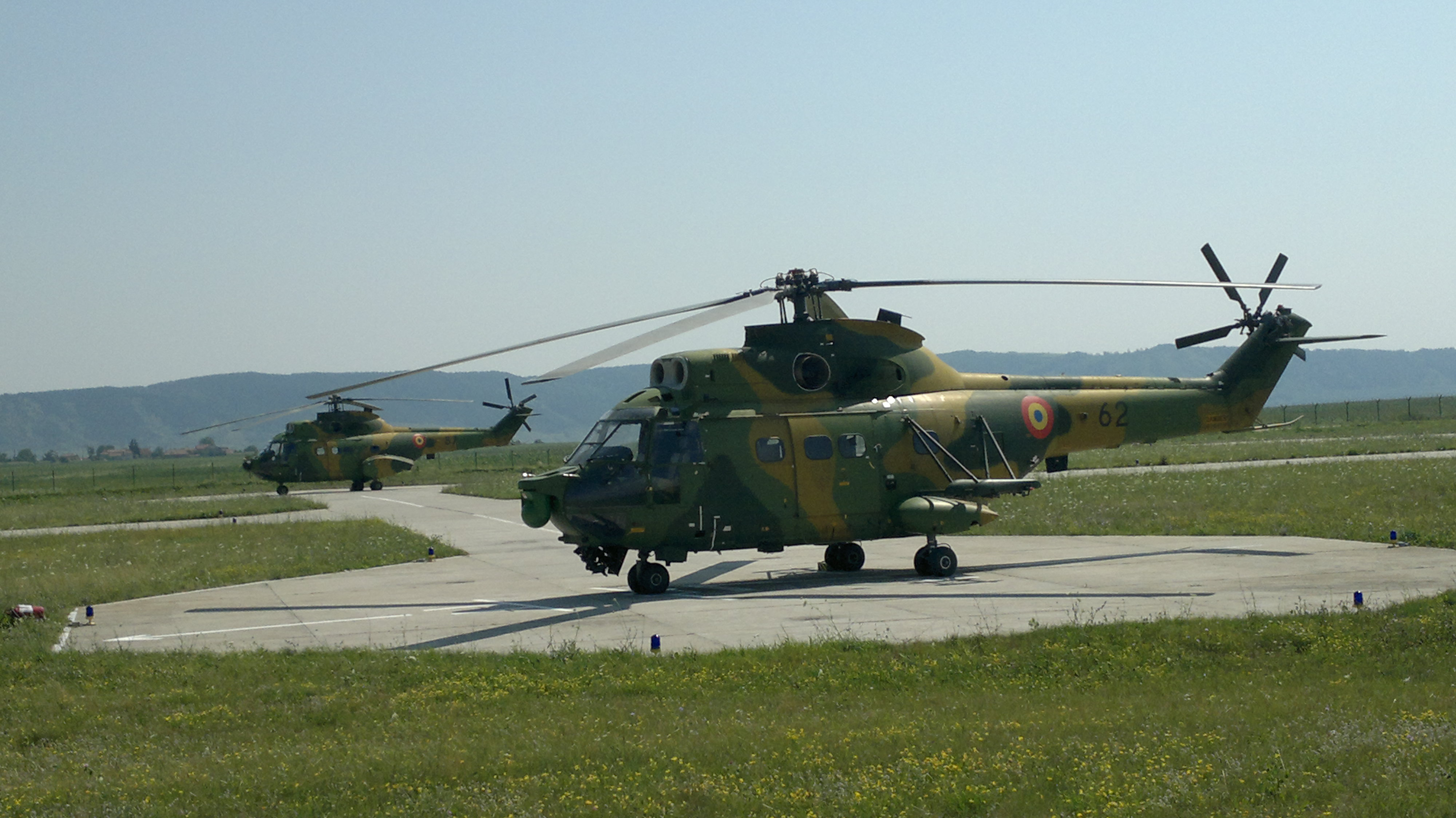
An IAR-330 SOCAT and an IAR-330 Puma on ground

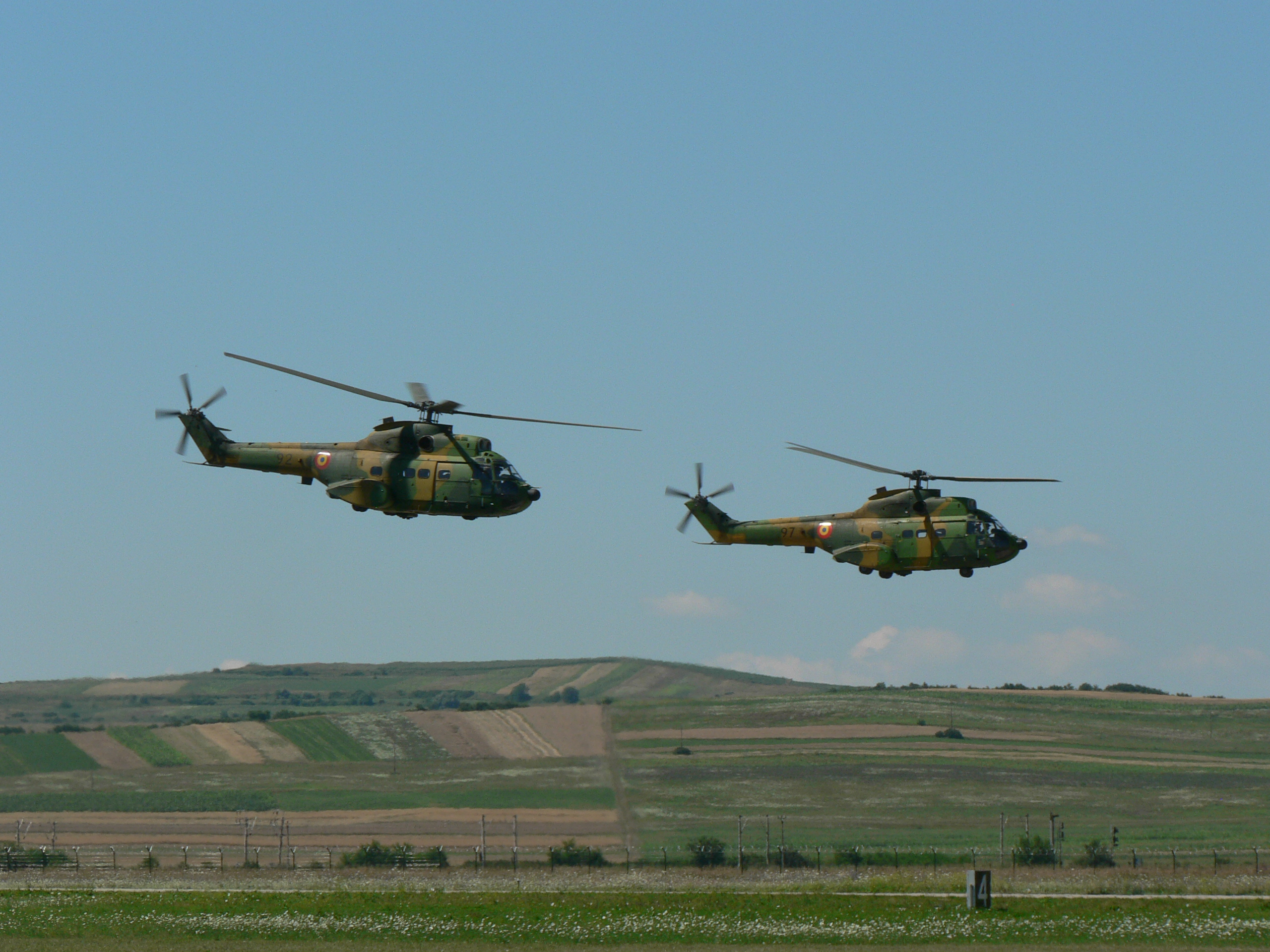
Two IAR 330 Pumas of the 713th Helicopter Squadron taking off

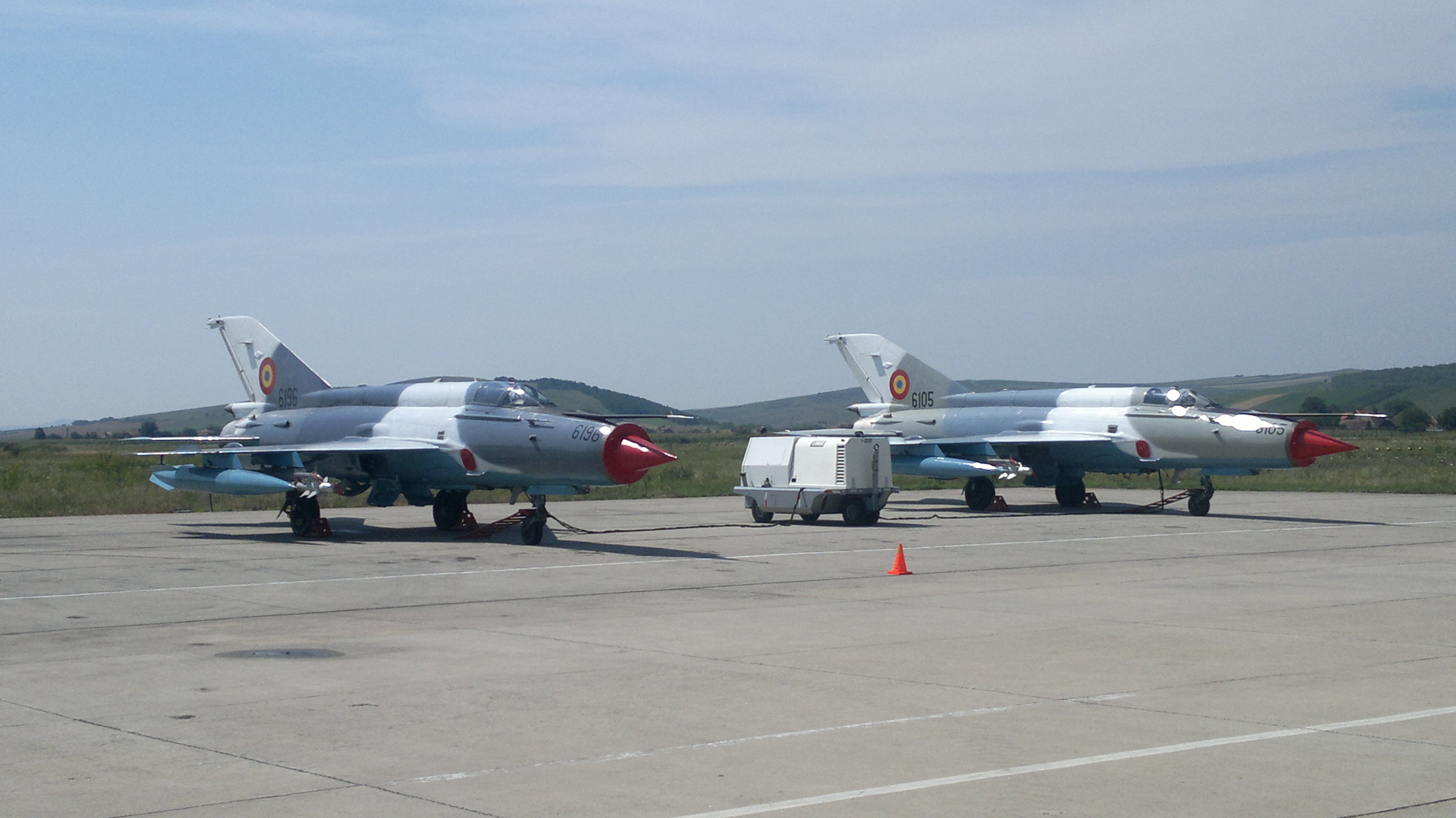
Pair of two MiG-21 LanceR 'C' aircraft of the 711th squadron in 2011

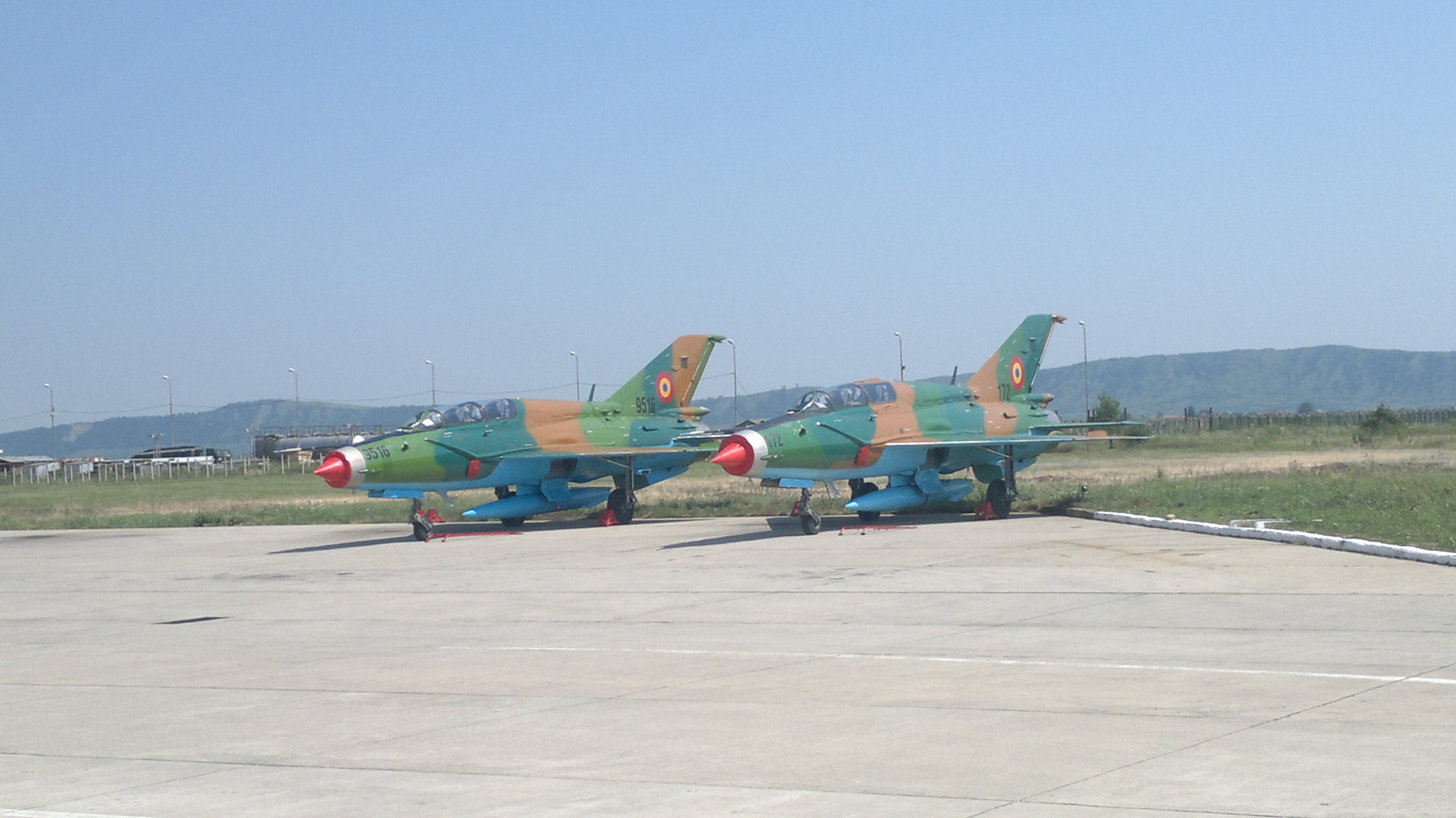
Pair of two MiG-21 LanceR 'B' aircraft at the base in 2011

== See also ==
- 2nd Guard Aviation Flotilla
- Naval Air Station Sigonella
- Aviano Air Base
- List of American military installations
- Romania–United States relations
