= Ciurești =

Ciureşti may refer to several villages in Romania:

- Ciureşti, a village in Vedea Commune, Argeș County
- Ciureşti and Ciureştii Noi, villages in Bălăşesti Commune, Galați County
- Ciureşti, a village in Corbu Commune, Olt County
