= Malu Alb =

Malu Alb ("The White Bank") may refer to:

- Malu Alb, a village in Drăgănești, Galați, Romania
- Malu Alb, a village in Bujoreni, Vâlcea, Romania
