= Umbrărești =

- Commune
- Coat of arms

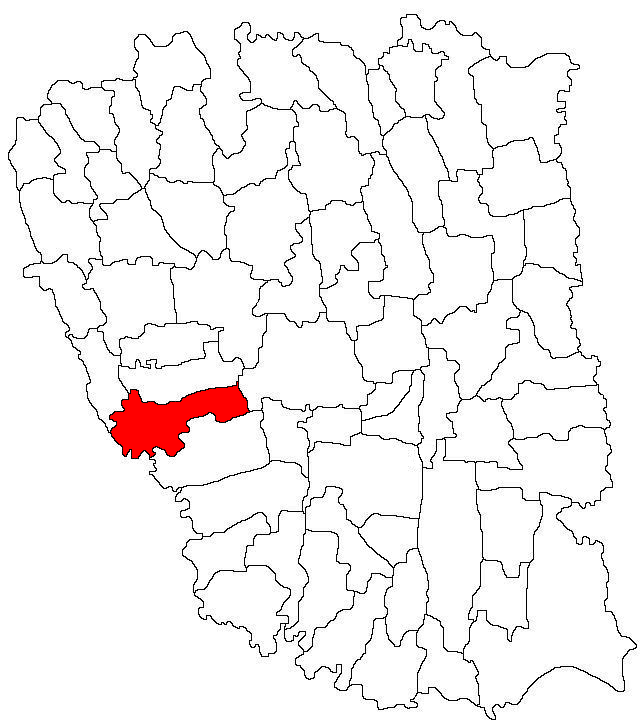
- Location in Galați County

- Location in Romania
- Coordinates: 45°43′N 27°28′E
- Country: Romania
- County: Galați

Government
  - Mayor (2024–2028): Ionel Stratulat (PSD)
- Area: 80.63 km^{2} (31.13 sq mi)
- Elevation: 21 m (69 ft)
- Population (2021-12-01): 5,932
  - Density: 73.57/km^{2} (190.5/sq mi)
- Time zone: UTC+02:00 (EET)
  - Summer (DST): UTC+03:00 (EEST)
- Postal code: 807310
- Area code: (+40) 0236
- Vehicle reg.: GL
- Website: primaria-umbraresti.ro

Umbrărești is a commune in Galați County, Western Moldavia, Romania with a population of 5,932 people as of 2021. It is composed of six villages: Condrea, Salcia, Siliștea, Torcești, Umbrărești, and Umbrărești-Deal.

Umbrărești-Deal was established in 1933 as Generalul Eremia Grigorescu. During the early communist regime, the name was changed to Vasile Roaită in 1950; this remained until 1996 when the present name was assigned.
