= Drăgușeni, Galați =

Drăgușeni
- Commune
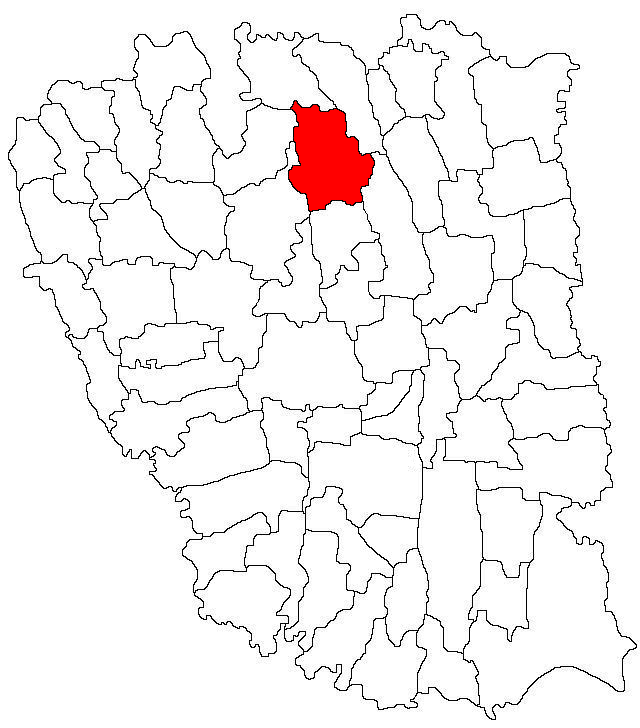
- Location in Galați County

- Location in Romania
- Coordinates: 45.9867°N 27.7426°E
- Country: Romania
- County: Galați
- Population (2021-12-01): 4,456
- Time zone: EET/EEST (UTC+2/+3)
- Vehicle reg.: GL

Drăgușeni is a commune in Galați County, Western Moldavia, Romania with a population of 5,255 people. It is composed of seven villages: Adam, Căuiești, Drăgușeni, Fundeanu, Ghinghești, Nicopole and Știețești.
