= Priponești =

- Commune
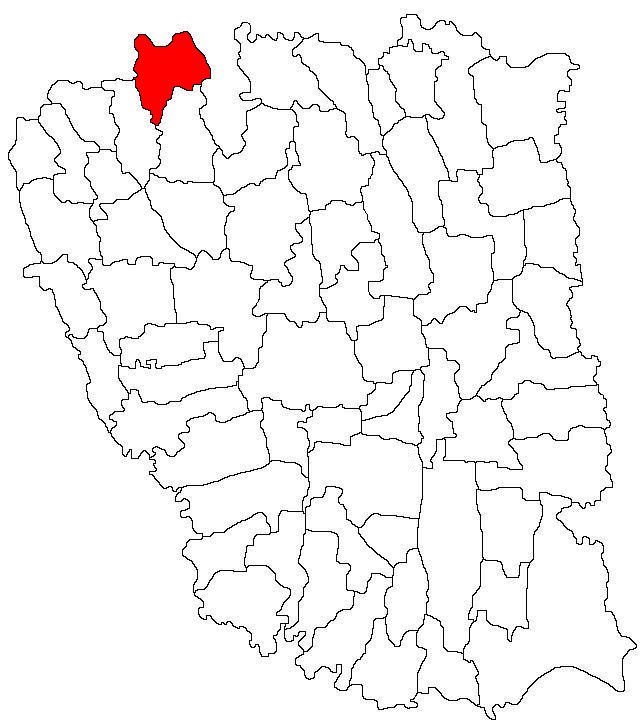
- Location in Galați County

- Location in Romania
- Coordinates: 46°5′N 27°26′E
- Country: Romania
- County: Galați
- Population (2021-12-01): 1,786
- Time zone: EET/EEST (UTC+2/+3)
- Vehicle reg.: GL

Priponești is a commune in Galați County, Western Moldavia, Romania with a population of 2,544. It is composed of five villages: Ciorăști, Huștiu, Liești, Priponești and Priponeștii de Jos.

Huștiu village has been depopulated since 1977.
