= Matca =

- Commune
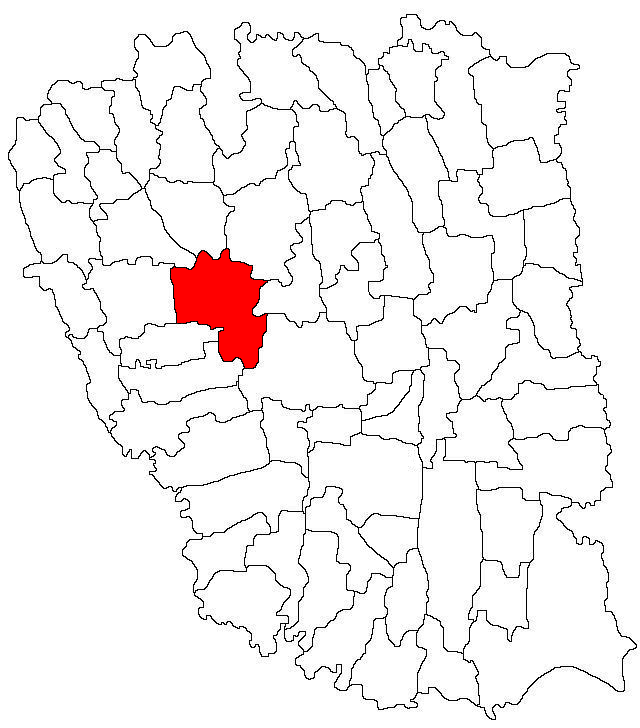
- Location in Galați County

- Location in Romania
- Coordinates: 45°51′N 27°32′E
- Country: Romania
- County: Galați
- Population (2021-12-01): 11,535
- Time zone: EET/EEST (UTC+2/+3)
- Vehicle reg.: GL

Matca is a commune in Galați County, Western Moldavia, Romania. It is composed of a single village, Matca.
