= Scânteiești =

- Commune
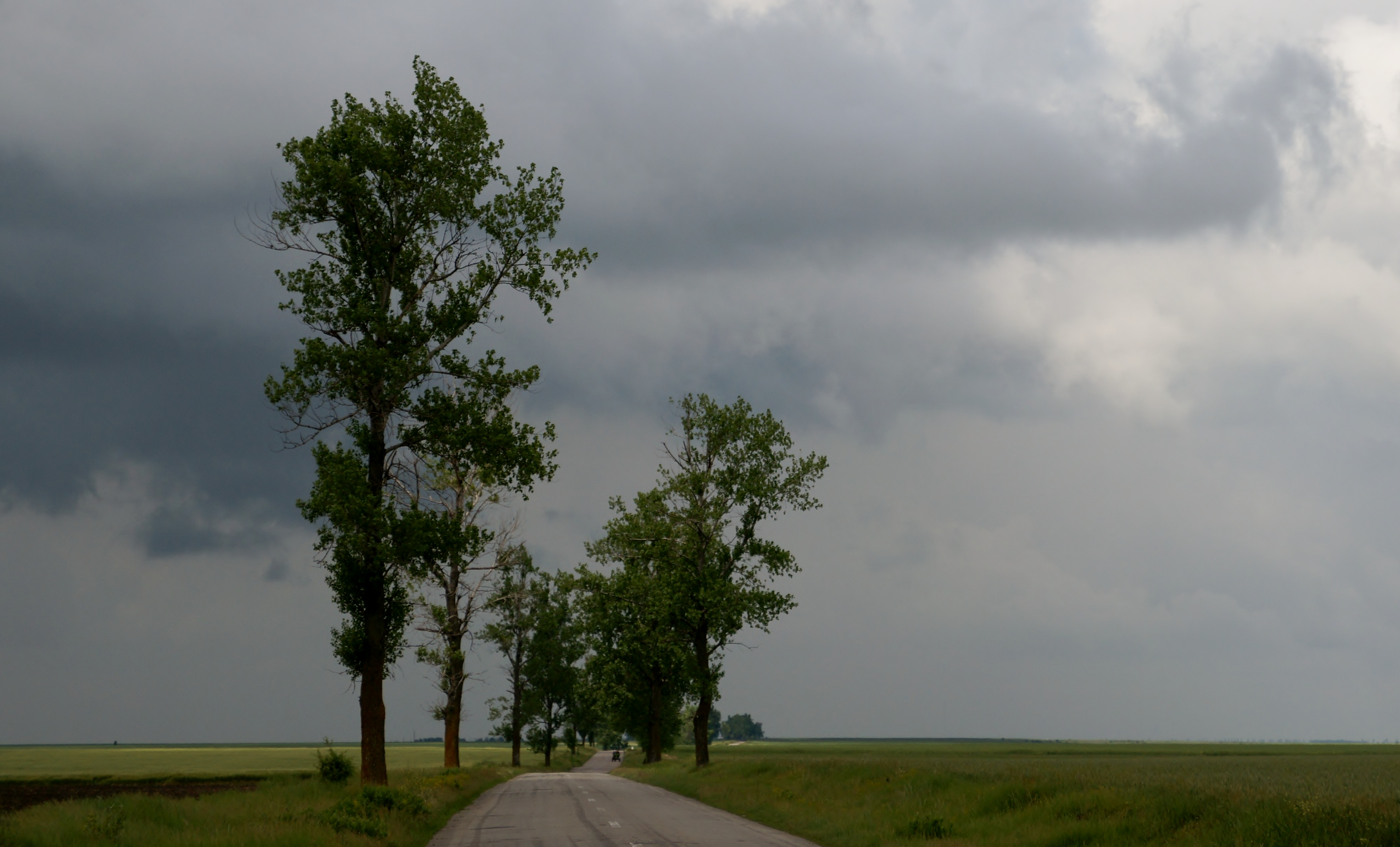

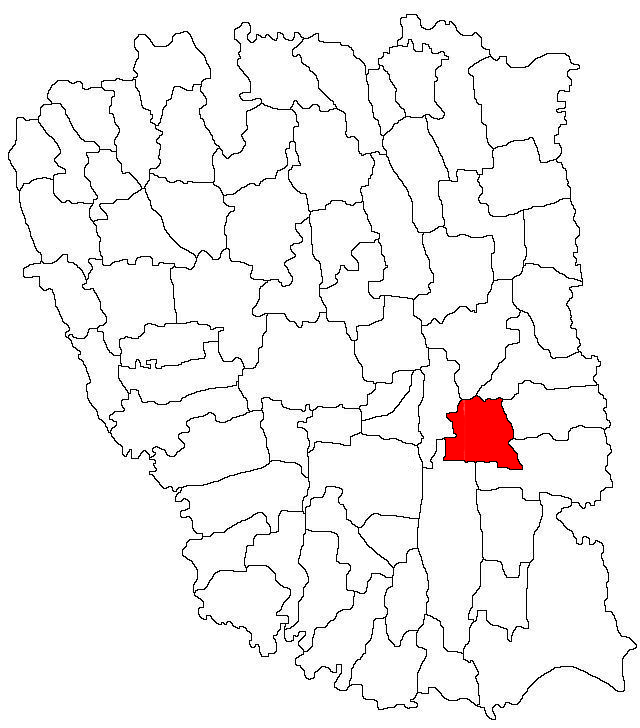
- Location in Galați County

- Location in Romania
- Coordinates: 45°41′N 27°59′E
- Country: Romania
- County: Galați
- Population (2021-12-01): 2,283
- Time zone: UTC+02:00 (EET)
  - Summer (DST): UTC+03:00 (EEST)
- Vehicle reg.: GL

Scânteiești is a commune in Galați County, Western Moldavia, Romania, with a population of 2,686 people. It is composed of two villages, Fântânele and Scânteiești.
