= Foltești =

- Commune
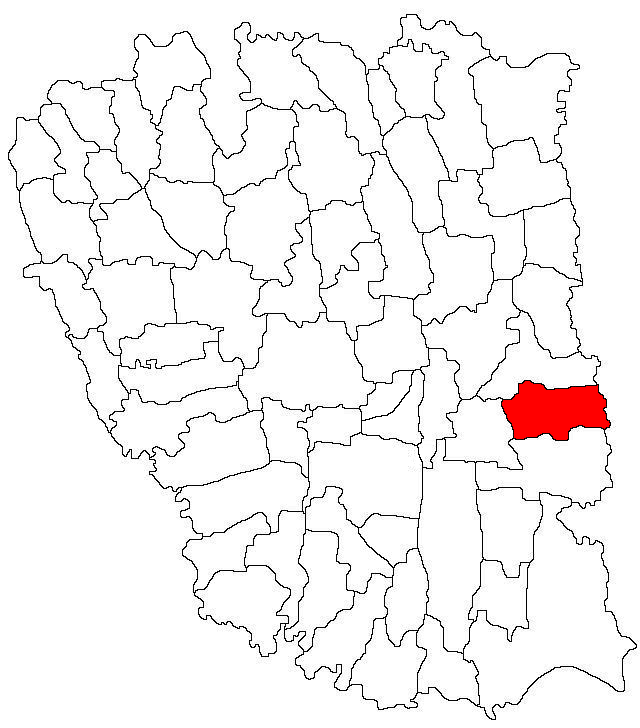
- Location in Galați County

- Location in Romania
- Coordinates: 45°44′40″N 28°03′40″E
- Country: Romania
- County: Galați
- Population (2021-12-01): 3,262
- Time zone: EET/EEST (UTC+2/+3)
- Vehicle reg.: GL

Foltești is a commune in Galați County, Western Moldavia, Romania with a population of 3,268 people. It is composed of two villages, Foltești and Stoicani.
