= Bălăbănești, Galați =

Bălăbănești
- Commune
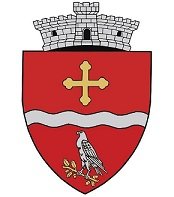
- Coat of arms

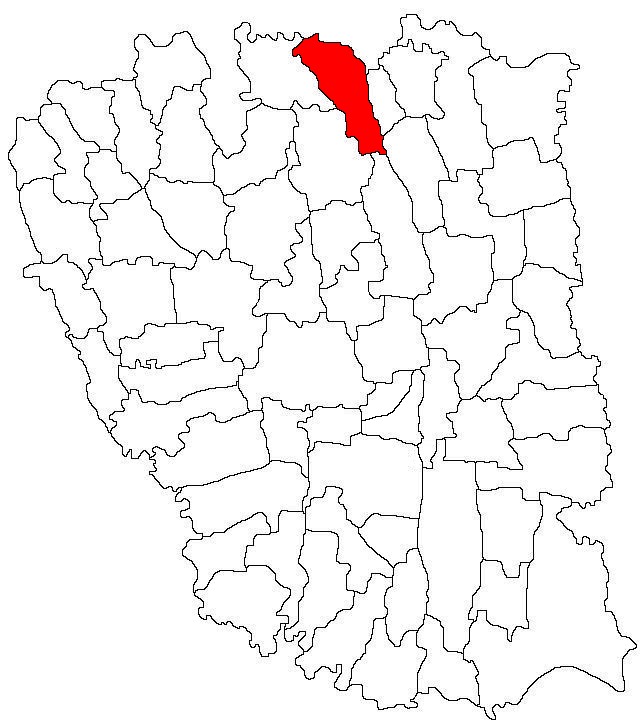
- Location in Galați County

- Location in Romania
- Coordinates: 46°6′N 27°43′E
- Country: Romania
- County: Galați

Government
  - Mayor (2024–2028): Marius Gicu Ciocan (PSD)
- Area: 25.7 km^{2} (9.9 sq mi)
- Elevation: 126 m (413 ft)
- Population (2021-12-01): 1,863
  - Density: 72.5/km^{2} (188/sq mi)
- Time zone: UTC+02:00 (EET)
  - Summer (DST): UTC+03:00 (EEST)
- Postal code: 807010
- Area code: (+40) 0236
- Vehicle reg.: GL
- Website: comunabalabanesti.ro

Bălăbănești is a commune in Galați County, Western Moldavia, Romania. It is composed of four villages: Bălăbănești, Lungești, Bursucani, and Zimbru. It also included two other villages until 2004, when they were split off to form Rădești Commune.

Historical population
Year	Pop.	±%
2002	2,252	—
2011	2,080	−7.6%
2021	1,863	−10.4%
Source: Census data

At the 2021 census, the commune had a population of 1,863, of which 94.42% were Romanians.

== Natives ==
- Ion Codreanu (1891–1960), major general during World War II
- Raicu Ionescu-Rion (1872–1895), literary critic and socialist commentator
- Gheorghe Tașcă (1875–1951), economist, lawyer, diplomat, politician, and a corresponding member of the Romanian Academy
