= Smulți =

- Commune
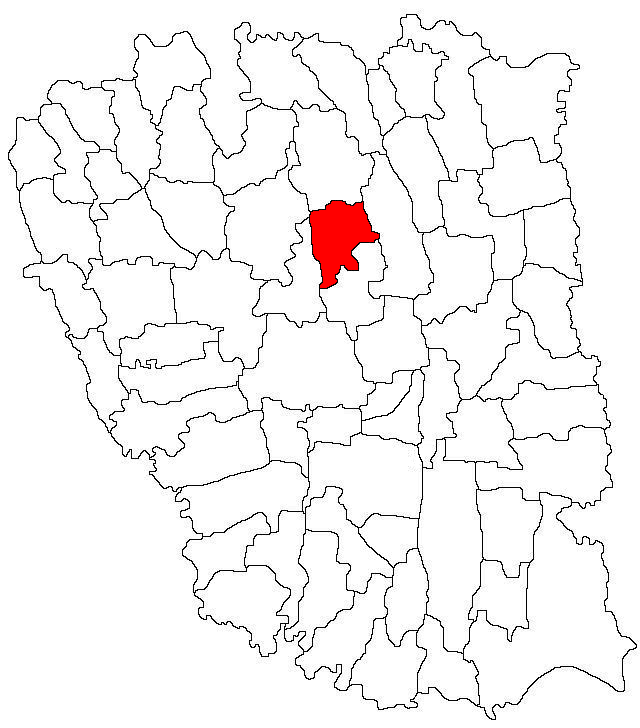
- Location in Galați County

- Location in Romania
- Coordinates: 45°56′N 27°45′E
- Country: Romania
- County: Galați
- Population (2021-12-01): 1,296
- Time zone: EET/EEST (UTC+2/+3)
- Vehicle reg.: GL

Smulți is a commune in Galați County, Western Moldavia, Romania with a population of 1,598 people. It is composed of a single village, Smulți.
