= Cuca, Galați =

Cuca
- Commune
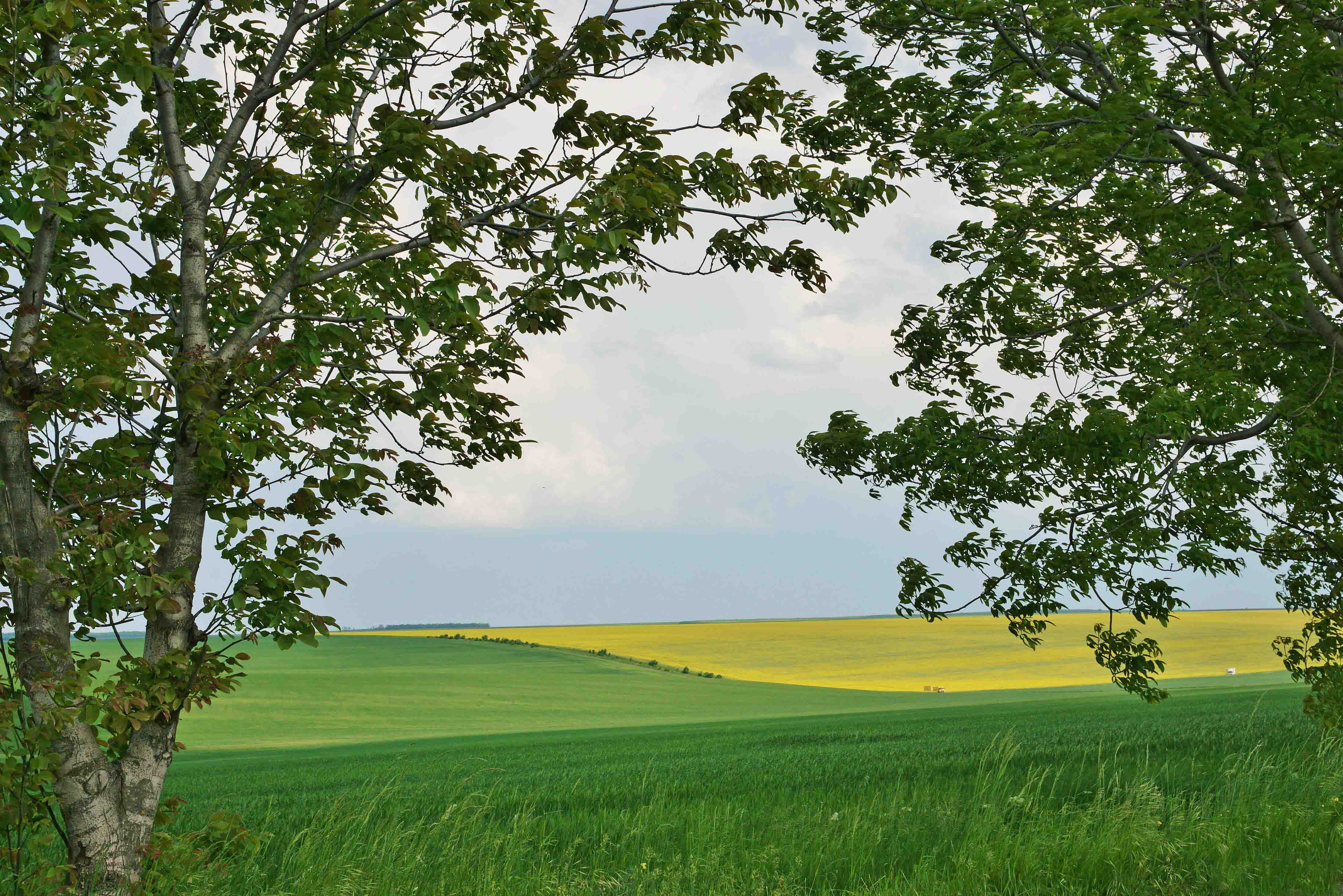

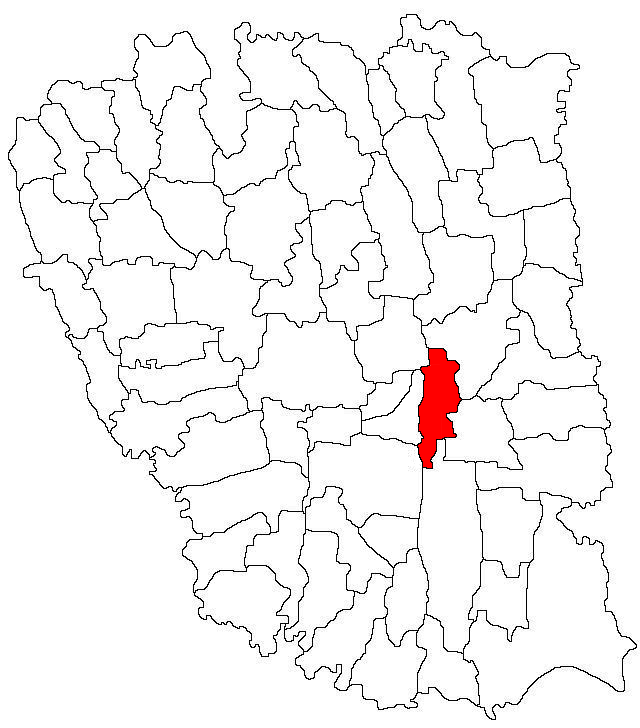
- Location in Galați County

- Location in Romania
- Coordinates: 45°44′N 27°54′E
- Country: Romania
- County: Galați

Government
  - Mayor (2024–2028): Cristian Sandu (PSD)
- Area: 44.75 km^{2} (17.28 sq mi)
- Elevation: 121 m (397 ft)
- Population (2021-12-01): 1,848
  - Density: 41.30/km^{2} (107.0/sq mi)
- Time zone: UTC+02:00 (EET)
  - Summer (DST): UTC+03:00 (EEST)
- Postal code: 807100
- Area code: (+40) 0236
- Vehicle reg.: GL
- Website: www.comunacuca.ro

Cuca is a commune in Galați County, Western Moldavia, Romania. It is composed of a single village, Cuca.

Historical population
Year	Pop.	±%
2002	2,582	—
2011	2,287	−11.4%
2021	1,848	−19.2%
Source: Census data

At the 2021 census, the commune had a population of 1,848; of those, 95.78% were Romanians.
