= Rădești, Galați =

Rădești
- Commune
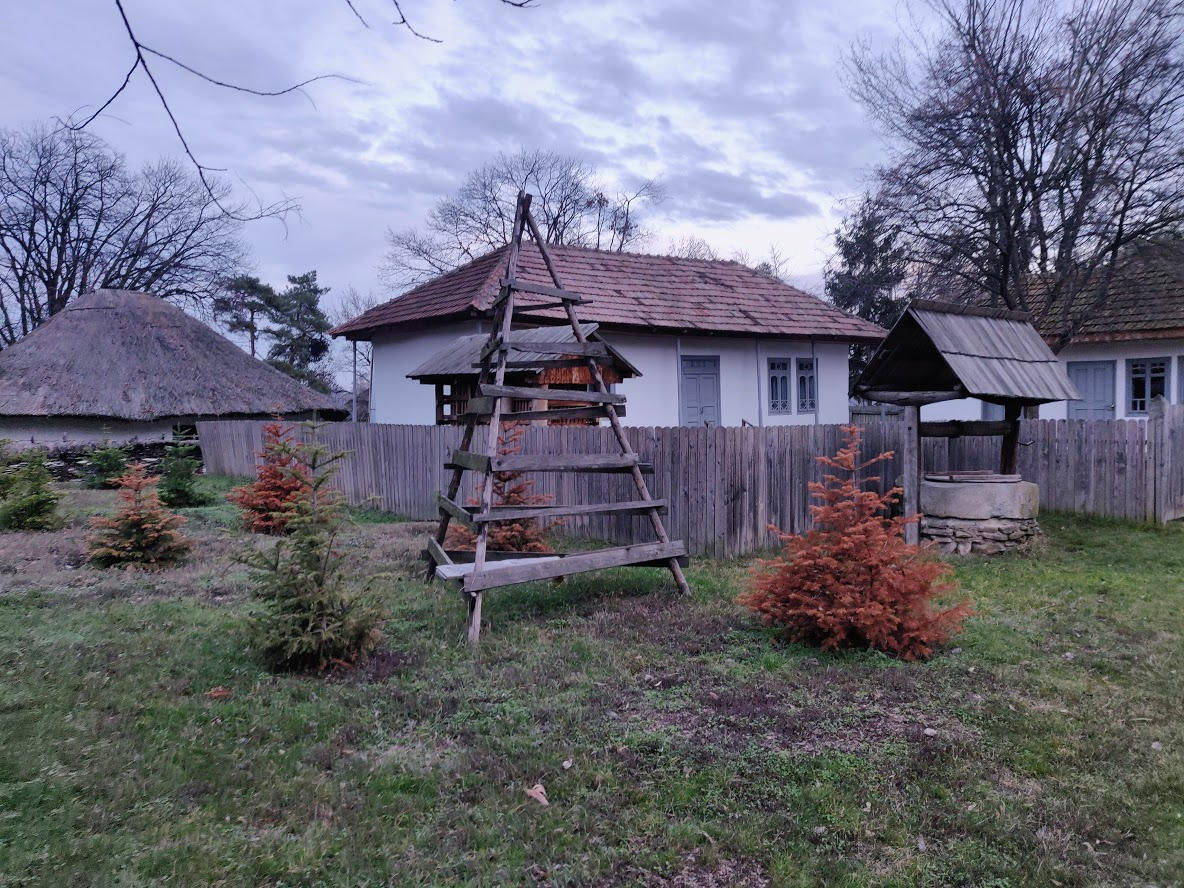

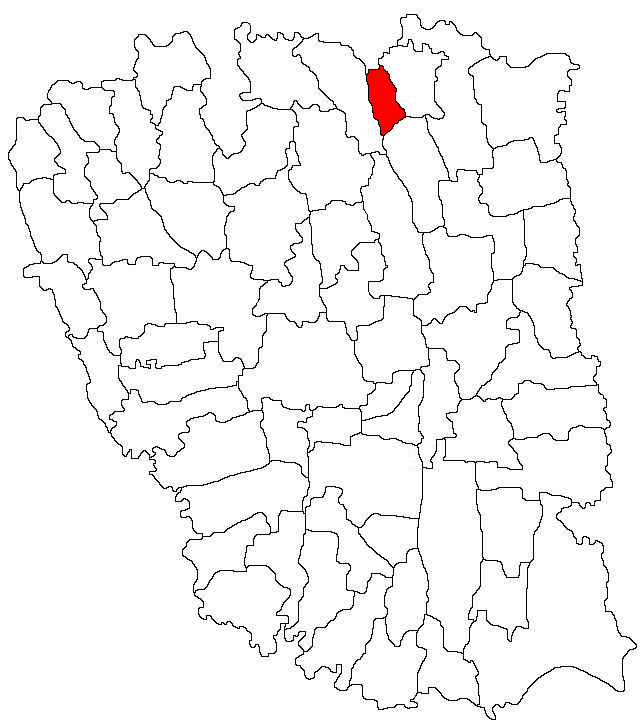
- Location in Galați County

- Location in Romania
- Coordinates: 46.0627°N 27.8060°E
- Country: Romania
- County: Galați
- Population (2021-12-01): 1,400
- Time zone: UTC+02:00 (EET)
  - Summer (DST): UTC+03:00 (EEST)
- Vehicle reg.: GL

Rădești is a commune in Galați County, Western Moldavia, Romania, with a population of 1,490 people (2011). It is composed of two villages, Cruceanu and Rădești. These were part of Bălăbănești Commune until 2004, when they were split off.
