= Vlădești, Galați =

Vlădești
- Commune
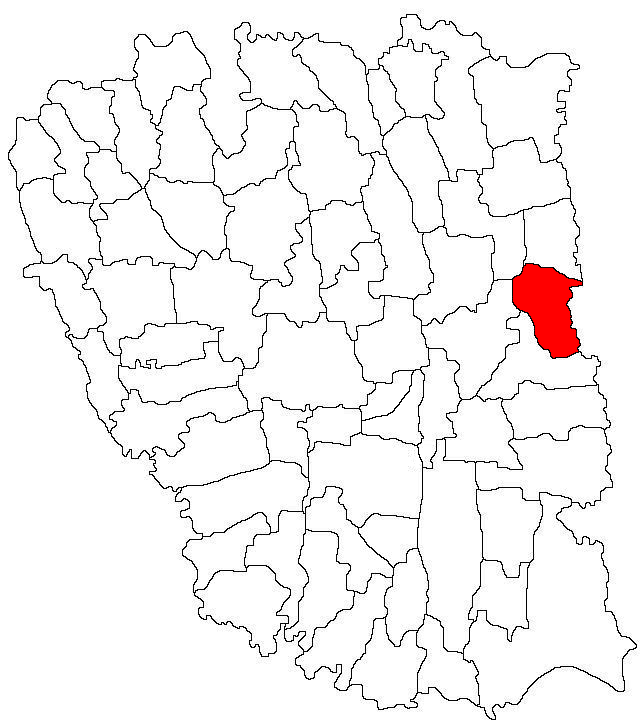
- Location in Galați County

- Location in Romania
- Coordinates: 45°50′10″N 28°05′20″E
- Country: Romania
- County: Galați
- Population (2021-12-01): 1,829
- Time zone: UTC+02:00 (EET)
  - Summer (DST): UTC+03:00 (EEST)
- Vehicle reg.: GL

Vlădești is a commune in Galați County, Western Moldavia, Romania with a population of 2,211 people. It is composed of two villages, Brănești and Vlădești.
