= Corod =

- Commune
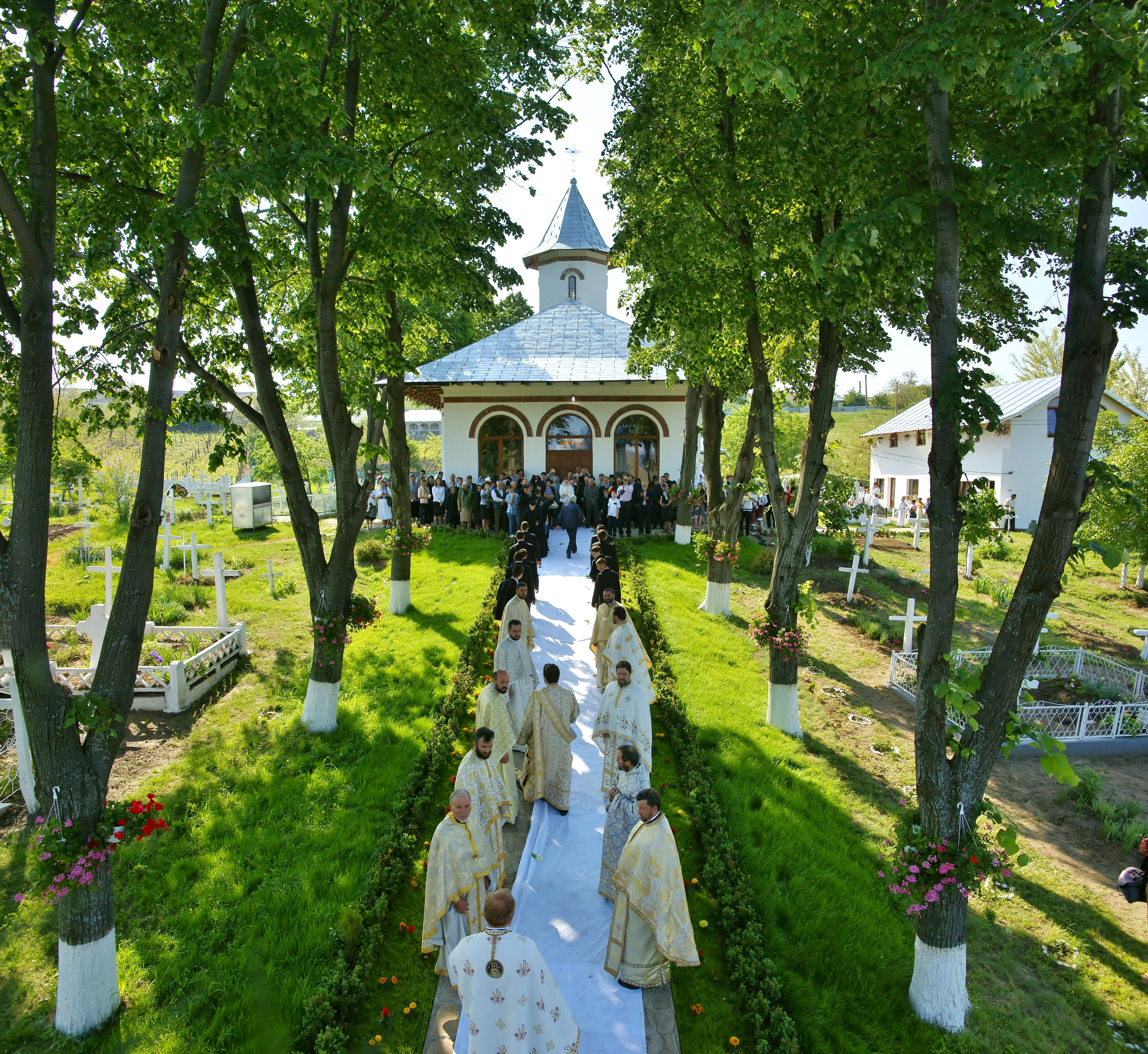
- Church in Brătulești

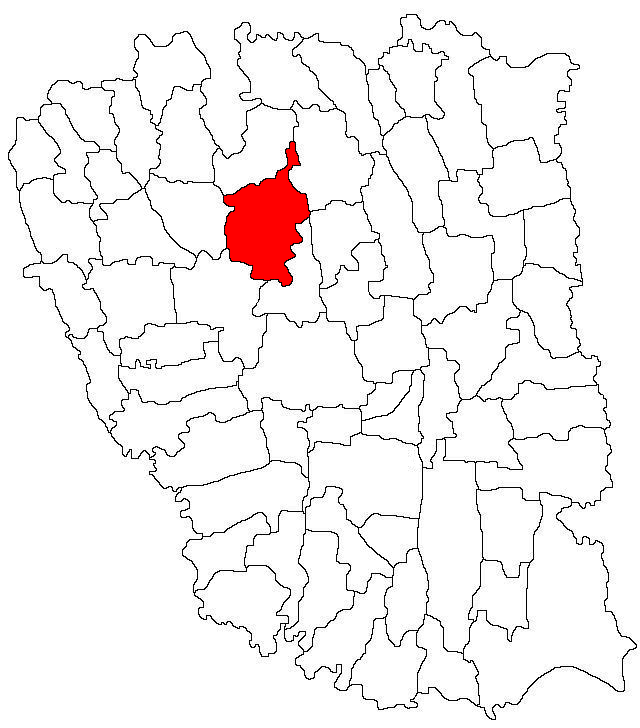
- Location in Galați County

- Location in Romania
- Coordinates: 45°54′N 27°37′E
- Country: Romania
- County: Galați

Government
  - Mayor (2024–2028): Dumitru Tenie (PSD)
- Area: 105.59 km^{2} (40.77 sq mi)
- Elevation: 106 m (348 ft)
- Population (2021-12-01): 7,030
  - Density: 66.6/km^{2} (172/sq mi)
- Time zone: UTC+02:00 (EET)
  - Summer (DST): UTC+03:00 (EEST)
- Postal code: 807080
- Area code: (+40) 0236
- Vehicle reg.: GL
- Website: www.primariacorodgl.ro

Corod is a commune in Galați County, Western Moldavia, Romania. It is composed of four villages: Blânzi, Brătulești, Cărăpcești, and Corod.

== Demography ==
Historical population
| Year | Pop. | ±% |
|---|---|---|
| 2002 | 7,870 | — |
| 2011 | 7,334 | −6.8% |
| 2021 | 7,030 | −4.1% |
Source: Census data

According to the 2011 census, Corod had 7,334 inhabitants, down from the previous census in 2002, when it had a registered 7,870 inhabitants. Most people (96.36%), were Romanian. The ethnicity for 3.61% of the population is unknown. Most of the inhabitants were Eastern Orthodox (96.06%). For 3.74% of the population the religious affiliation was unknown. At the 2021 census, the commune had a population of 7,030; of those, 96.07% were Romanians.
