= Movileni, Galați =

Movileni
- Commune
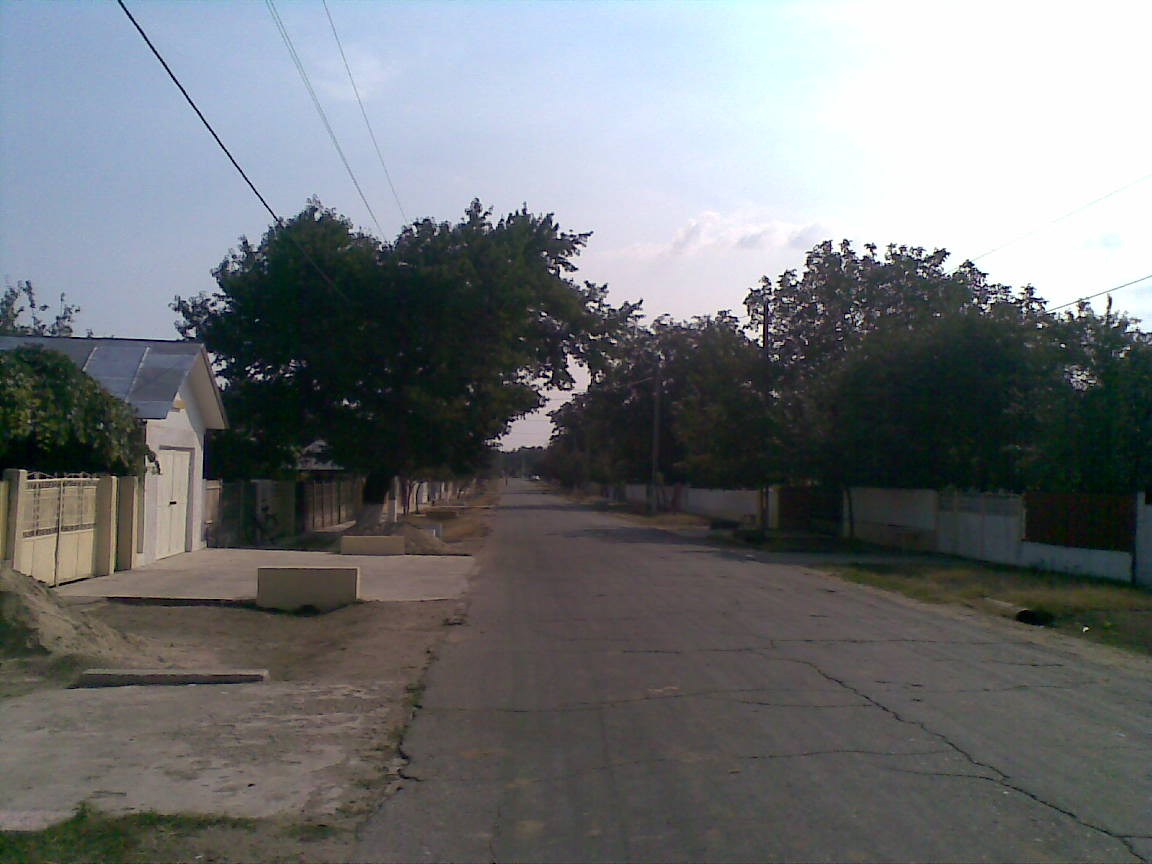

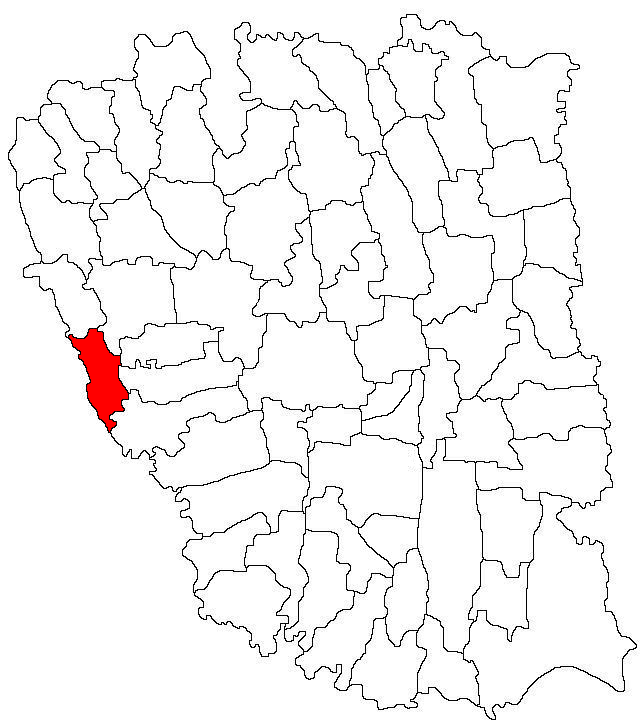
- Location in Galați County

- Location in Romania
- Coordinates: 45.7583°N 27.3796°E
- Country: Romania
- County: Galați
- Population (2021-12-01): 3,090
- Time zone: UTC+02:00 (EET)
  - Summer (DST): UTC+03:00 (EEST)
- Vehicle reg.: GL

Movileni is a commune in Galați County, Western Moldavia, Romania, with a population of 3,175 people. It is composed of a single village, Movileni.
