= Poiana, Galați =

Poiana
- Commune
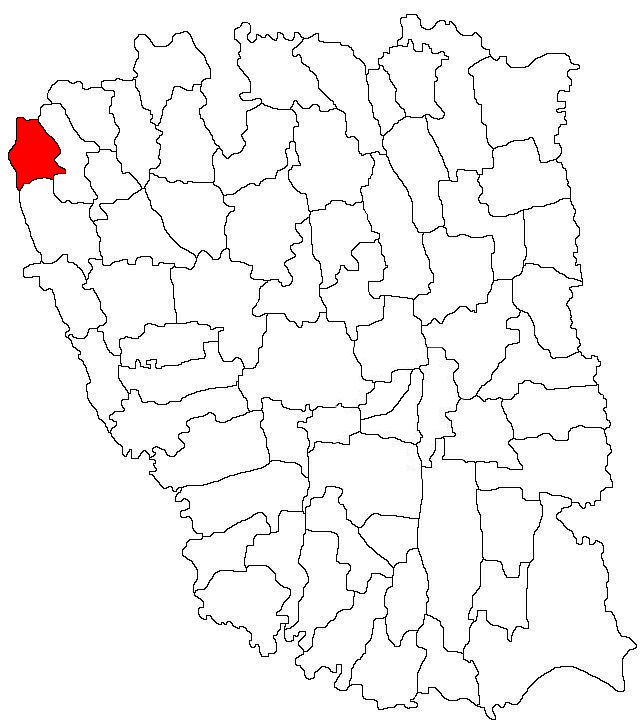
- Location in Galați County

- Location in Romania
- Coordinates: 45°59′N 27°15′E
- Country: Romania
- County: Galați
- Population (2021-12-01): 1,592
- Time zone: EET/EEST (UTC+2/+3)
- Vehicle reg.: GL

Poiana is a commune in Galați County, Western Moldavia, Romania with a population of 2,150 people. It is composed of two villages, Poiana and Vișina. These were part of Nicorești Commune until 2004, when they were split off.
