= Negrilești, Galați =

Negrilești
- Commune
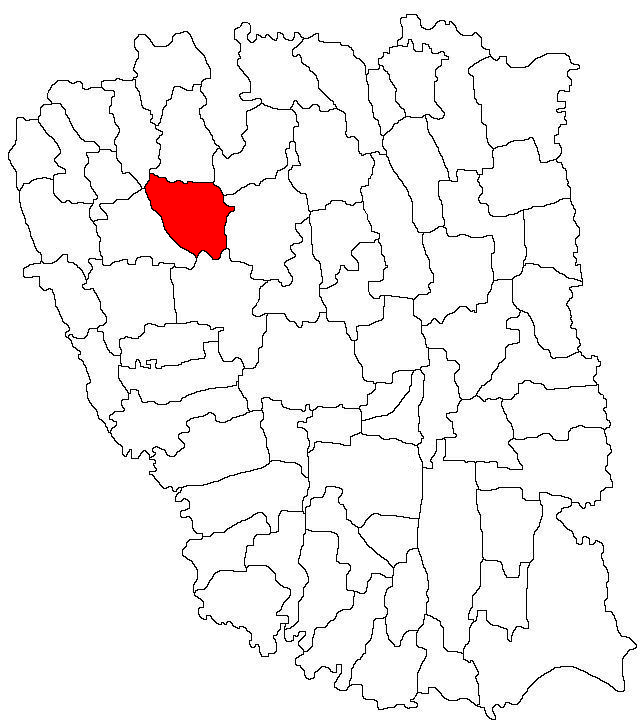
- Location in Galați County

- Location in Romania
- Coordinates: 45°57′N 27°29′E
- Country: Romania
- County: Galați

Government
  - Mayor (2020–2024): Alexandru Fuică-Haisler (PSD)
- Area: 32 km^{2} (12 sq mi)
- Population (2021-12-01): 2,400
  - Density: 75/km^{2} (190/sq mi)
- Time zone: UTC+02:00 (EET)
  - Summer (DST): UTC+03:00 (EEST)
- Vehicle reg.: GL

Negrilești is a commune in Galați County, Western Moldavia, Romania that lies close to Tecuci. It is composed of two villages, Negrilești and Slobozia Blăneasa. These were part of Munteni Commune until 2004, when they were split off.

== Area ==
It has an area of 43.80 square kilometers.
