= Vârlezi =

- Commune
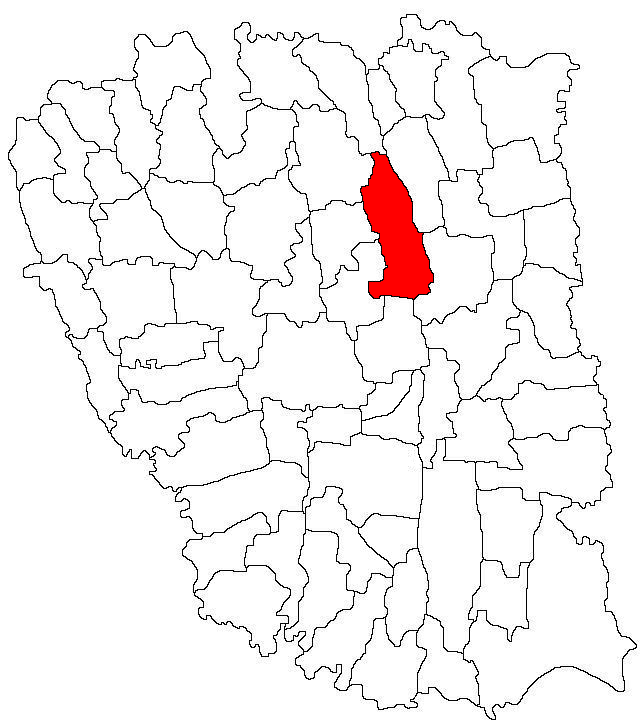
- Location in Galați County

- Location in Romania
- Coordinates: 45°54′N 27°51′E
- Country: Romania
- County: Galați
- Population (2021-12-01): 1,646
- Time zone: EET/EEST (UTC+2/+3)
- Vehicle reg.: GL

Vârlezi is a commune in Galați County, Western Moldavia, Romania with a population of 2,204 people, mostly Orthodox. It is composed of two villages, Crăiești and Vârlezi.
