= Ghidigeni =

- Commune
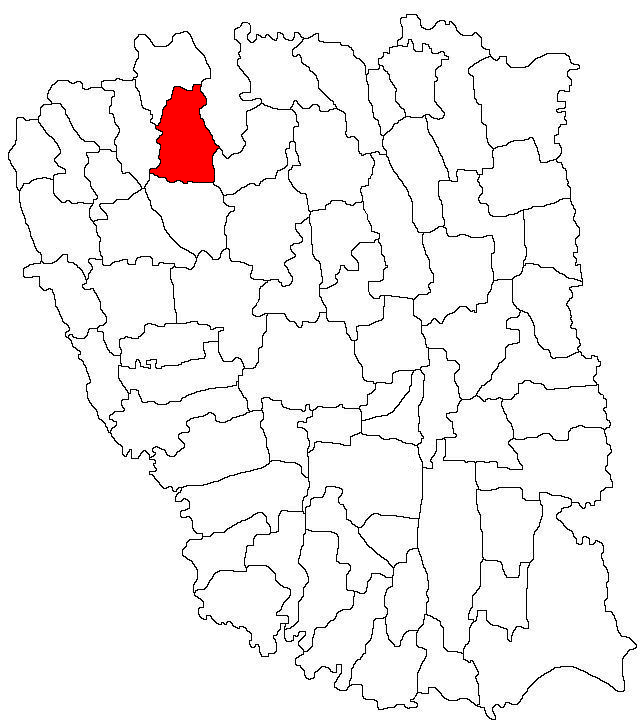
- Location in Galați County

- Location in Romania
- Coordinates: 46°3′N 27°29′E
- Country: Romania
- County: Galați
- Area: 71.51 km^{2} (27.61 sq mi)
- Population (2021-12-01): 6,212
  - Density: 87/km^{2} (220/sq mi)
- Time zone: EET/EEST (UTC+2/+3)
- Vehicle reg.: GL

Ghidigeni is a commune in Galați County, Western Moldavia, Romania with a population of 6,244 people. It is composed of eight villages: Gara Ghidigeni, Gârbovăț, Gefu, Ghidigeni, Gura Gârbovățului, Slobozia Corni, Tălpigi and Tăplău.
