= Vânători, Galați =

Vânători
- Commune
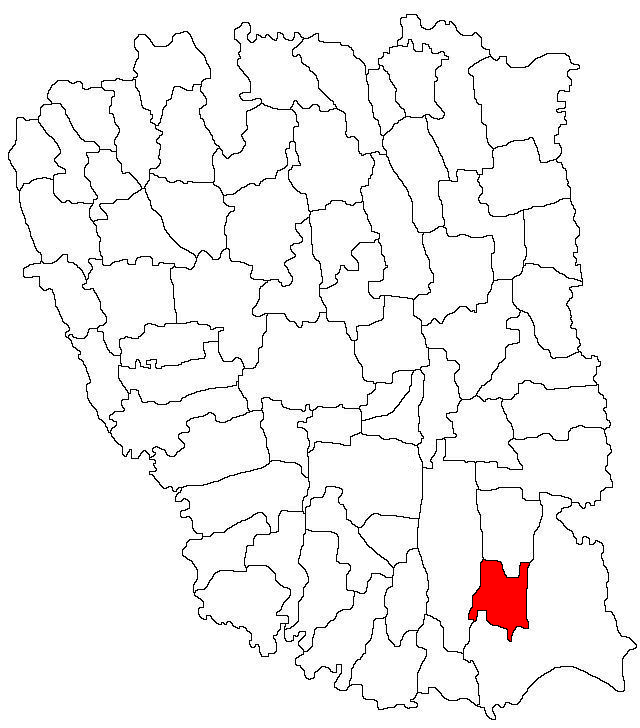
- Location in Galați County

- Location in Romania
- Coordinates: 45°32′00″N 28°00′55″E
- Country: Romania
- County: Galați

Government
  - Mayor (2024–2028): Costel Manolachi (PSD)
- Area: 44.93 km^{2} (17.35 sq mi)
- Elevation: 85 m (279 ft)
- Population (2021-12-01): 6,926
  - Density: 154.2/km^{2} (399.2/sq mi)
- Time zone: UTC+02:00 (EET)
  - Summer (DST): UTC+03:00 (EEST)
- Postal code: 807325
- Area code: (+40) 0236
- Vehicle reg.: GL
- Website: primariavanatorigalati.ro

Vânători is a commune in Galați County, Western Moldavia, Romania with a population of 6,926 people as of 2021. It is composed of three villages: Costi, Odaia Manolache, and Vânători.
