= Bălășești, Galați =

Bălășești
- Commune
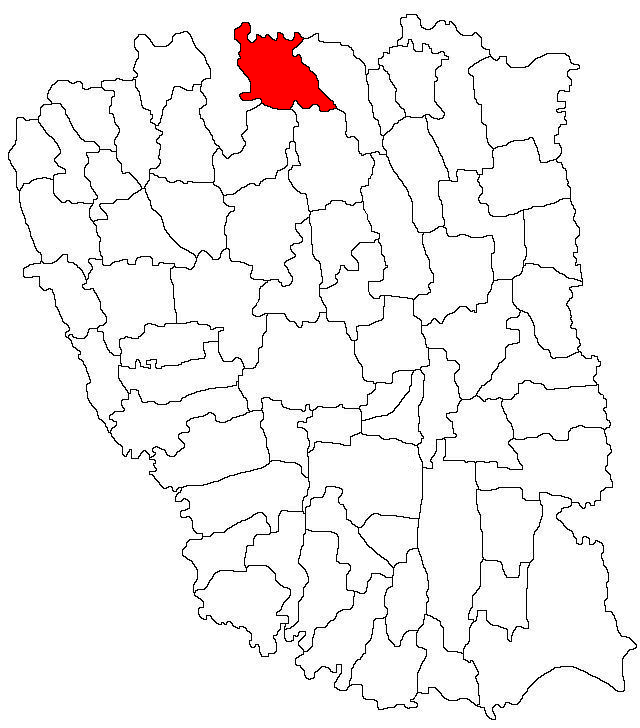
- Location in Galați County

- Location in Romania
- Coordinates: 46°05′55″N 27°40′13″E
- Country: Romania
- County: Galați

Government
  - Mayor (2024–2028): Paul Cezar Maftei (PSD)
- Area: 64.79 km^{2} (25.02 sq mi)
- Elevation: 162 m (531 ft)
- Population (2021-12-01): 1,891
  - Density: 29.19/km^{2} (75.59/sq mi)
- Time zone: UTC+02:00 (EET)
  - Summer (DST): UTC+03:00 (EEST)
- Postal code: 807020
- Area code: +(40) 236
- Vehicle reg.: GL
- Website: www.comunabalasesti.ro

Bălășești is a commune in Galați County, Western Moldavia, Romania, with a population of 1,891 as of 2021. It is composed of four villages: Bălășești, Ciurești, Ciureștii Noi, and Pupezeni.

Historical population
Year	Pop.	±%
2002	2,566	—
2011	2,295	−10.6%
2021	1,891	−17.6%
Source: Census data
