= Galați County =

County of Romania

Galați County Județul Galați
- County
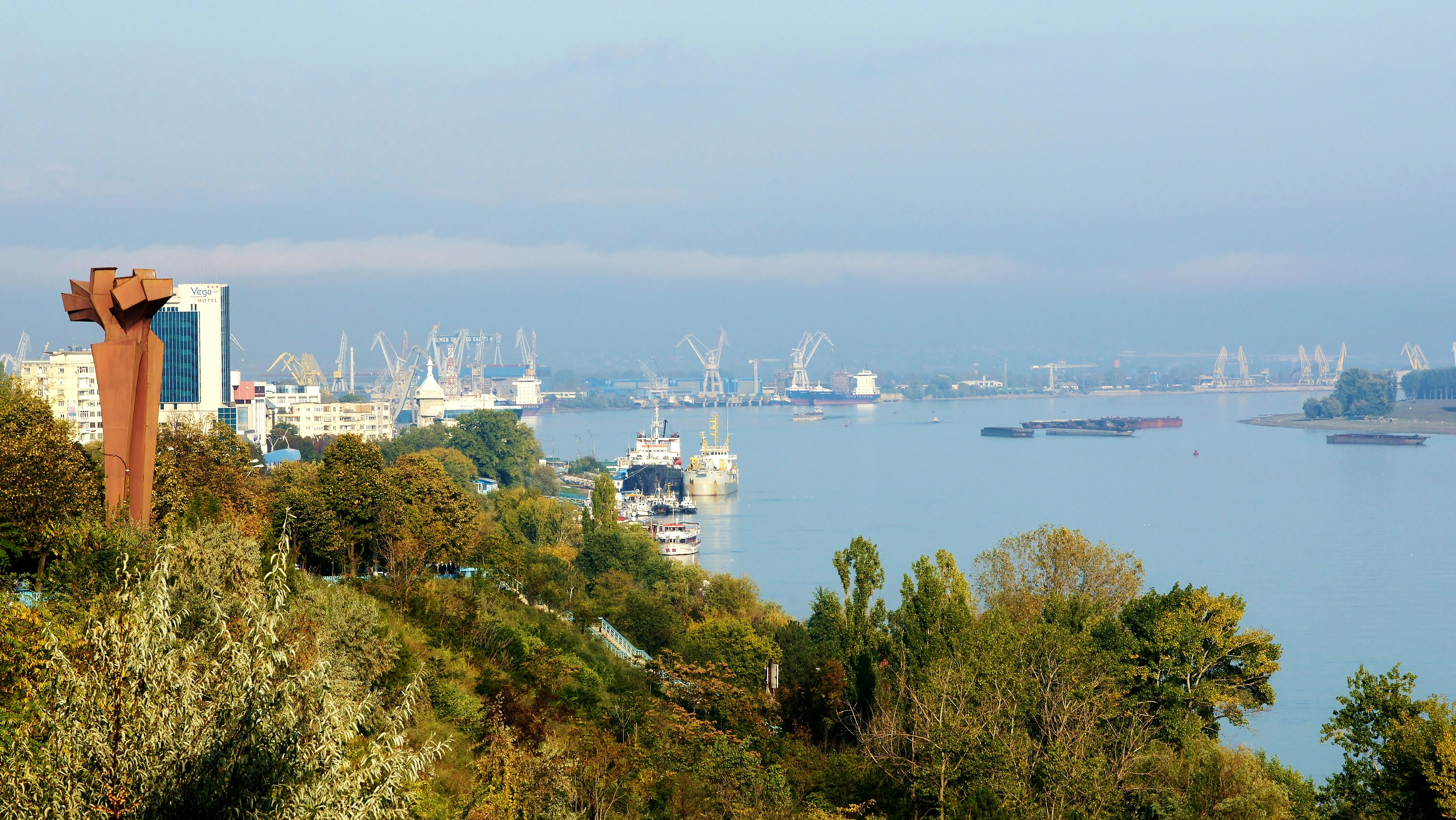
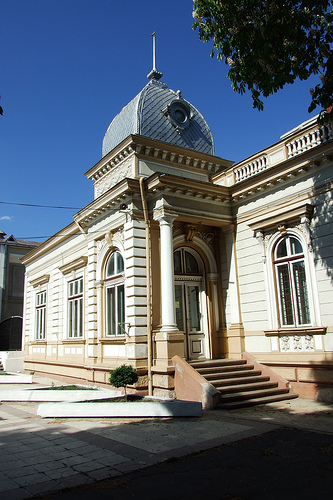
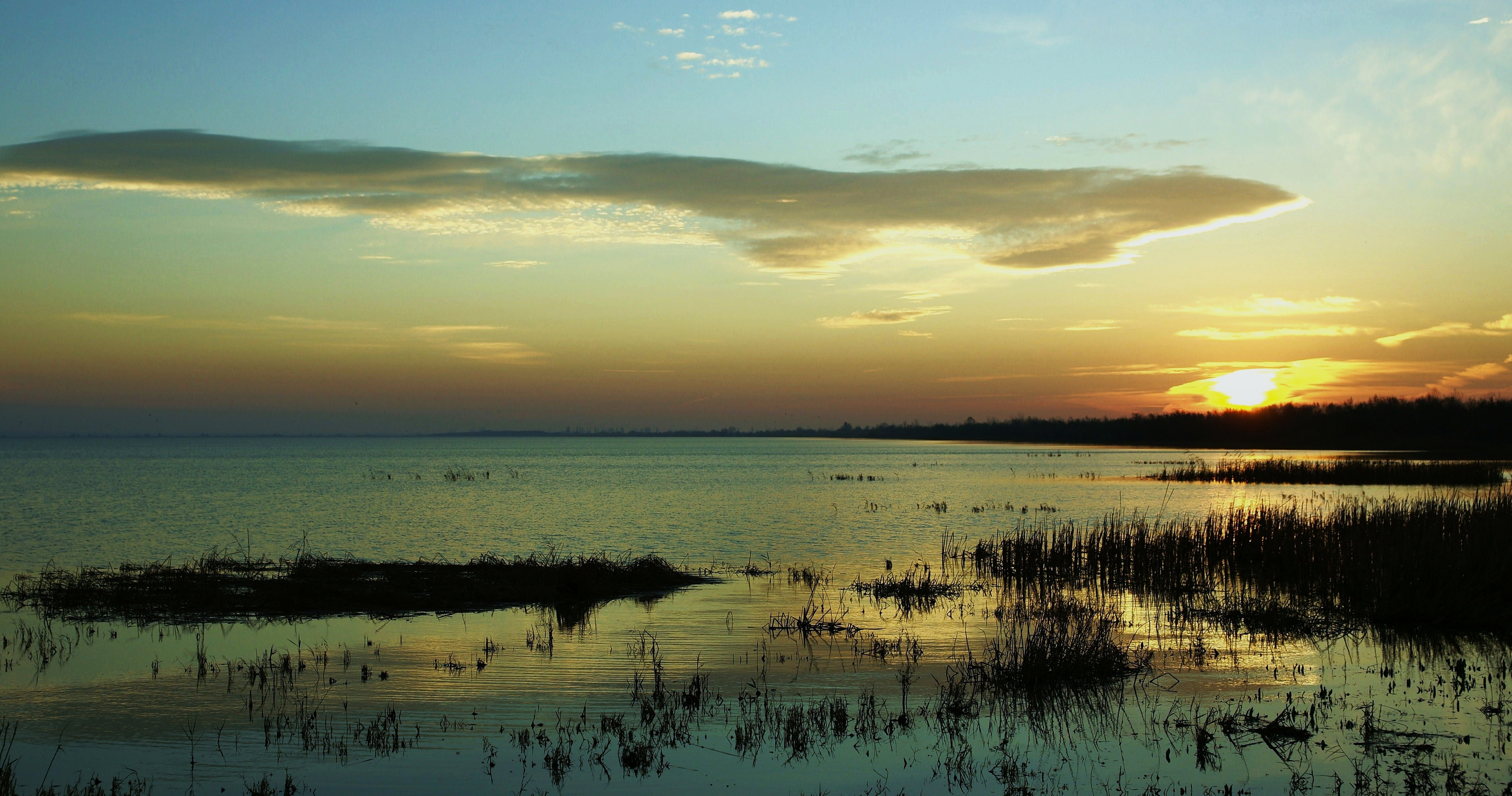
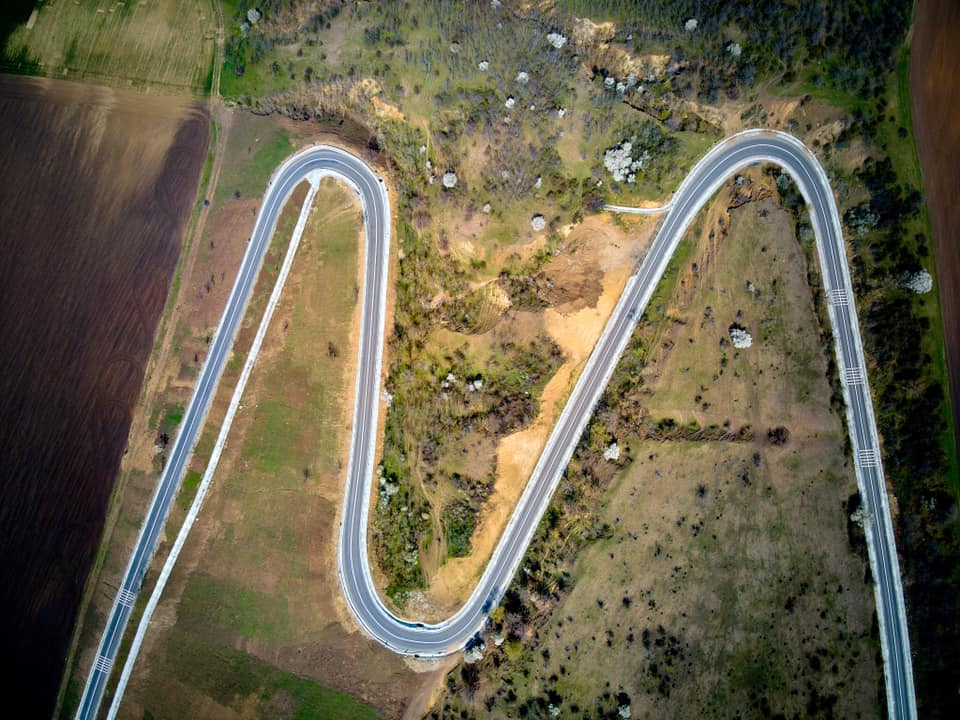
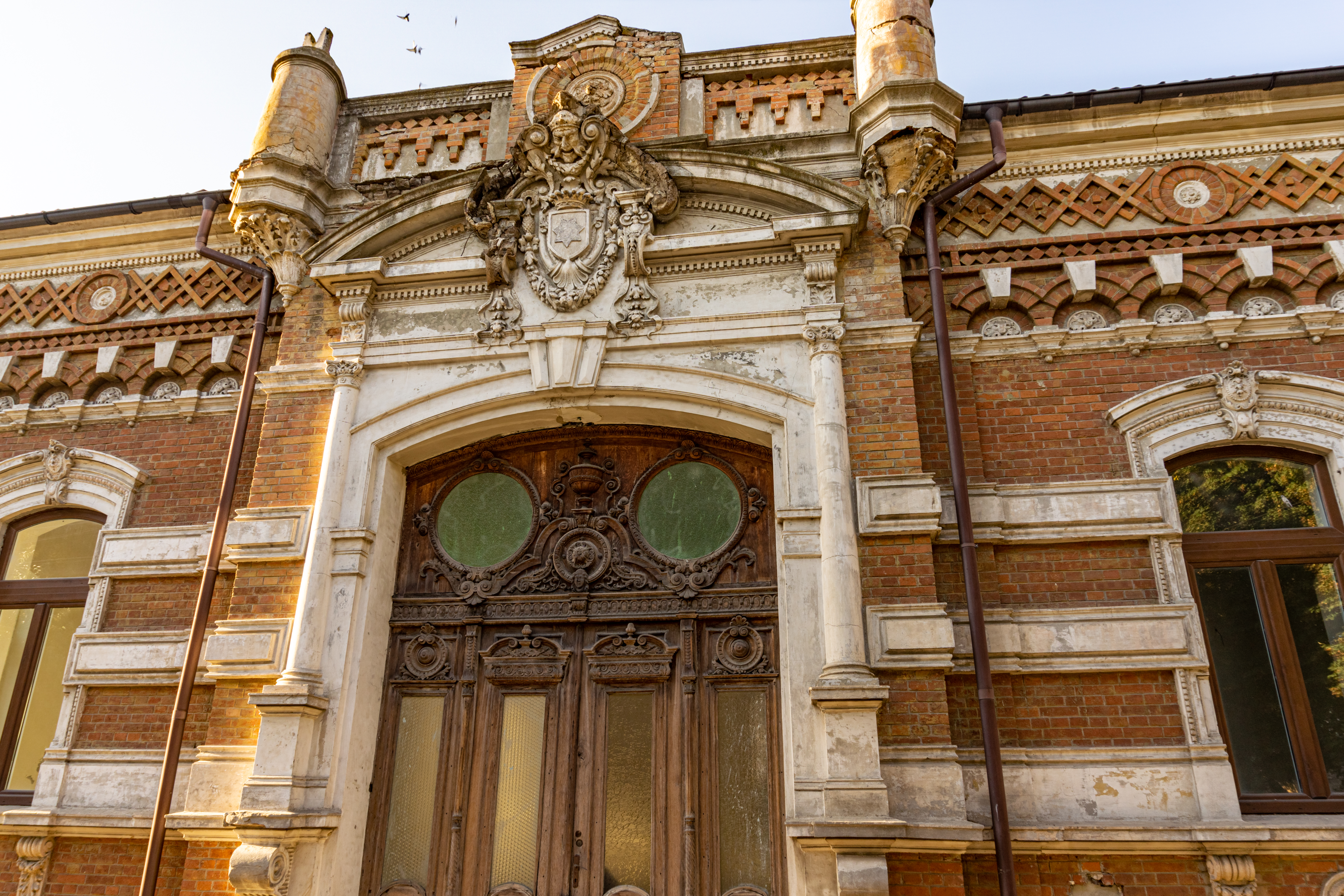
- Danube riverside and port in Galați Tecuci Brateș Lake DJ242 Road Balș house, Galați Brateș Lake

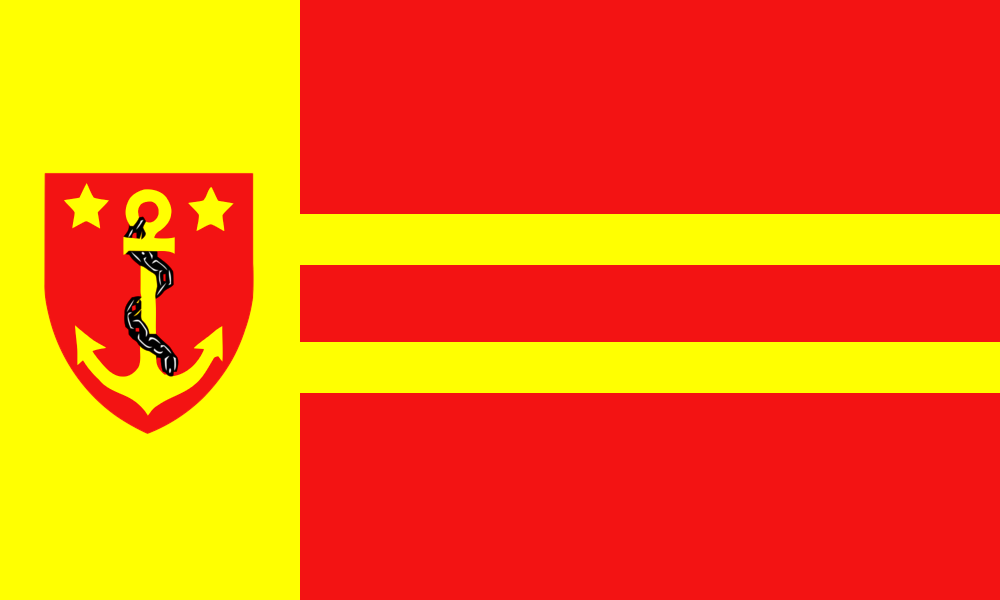
- Flag Coat of arms

- Coordinates: 45.79°N 27.78°E
- Country: Romania
- Development region^{1}: Sud-Est
- Historic region: Western Moldavia
- Capital city (Reședință de județ): Galați

Government
  - Type: County Council
  - President of the County Council: Costel Fotea (PSD)
  - Prefect^{2}: Andreea-Anamaria Naggar

Area
  - County: 4,466.3 km^{2} (1,724.4 sq mi)
  - Rank: 34th in Romania (1.9%)

Population (2021 census)
  - County: 496,892
  - Rank: 15th in Romania
  - Density: 111.25/km^{2} (288.1/sq mi)
  - Urban: 259,071
- Time zone: UTC+2 (EET)
  - Summer (DST): UTC+3 (EEST)
- Postal Code: 80wxyz^{3}
- Area code: +40 x36^{4}
- ISO 3166 code: RO-GL
- Car Plates: GL^{5}
- GDP: US$3.15 billion (2015)
- GDP per capita: US$5,874 (2015)
- Website: County Council; County Prefecture
- ^{1}The developing regions of Romania have no administrative role. They were formed just to attract funds from the European Union^{2} as of 2007, the Prefect is not a politician, but a public functionary. He (or she) is not allowed to be a member of a political party, and is banned to have any political activity in the first six months after the resignation (or exclusion) from the public functionary corps^{3}w, x, y, and z are digits that indicate the city, the street, part of the street, or even the building of the address^{4}x is a digit indicating the operator: 2 for the former national operator, Romtelecom, and 3 for the other ground telephone networks^{5}used on both the plates of the vehicles that operate only in the county limits (like utility vehicles, ATVs, etc.), and the ones used outside the county

Galați (Romanian pronunciation: [ɡaˈlatsʲ]) is a county (județ) of Romania, in Moldavia region, with the seat at Galați, between 45°25'N and 46°10'N latitude, 27°20'E and 28°10'E longitude. It borders the counties of Vaslui, Vrancea, Brăila, Tulcea. To the east it borders the Republic of Moldova, the border crossing points being Galați–Giurgiulești (road and broad-gauge railway) and Oancea–Cahul (road). The county was established in 1968, through the territorial reorganization of the former Galați Region, which included a territory similar to that of the current Brăila and Galați counties, plus the northern part of Tulcea County.

Galați County is part of the South-East Development Region (together with the counties of Vrancea, Buzău, Brăila, Constanța and Tulcea), of the Lower Danube Euroregion (together with the counties of Brăila and Tulcea, with the Cahul and Cantemir districts in the south of the Republic of Moldova and with the Odesa region in the west of Ukraine) as well as the Free Economic Zone Galați–Giurgiulești–Reni (Romania-Moldova-Ukraine).

== Toponymy ==
Codex Latinus Parisinus from 1395 mentions a "Caladda at the bend of the Danube", a Genoese port of call where it could dock. The name Galata, a neighbourhood of Constantinople and another former Genoese port of call, has the same origin. The Romanian academic world mostly adheres to this Italian origin dating back to the 14th century: caladda in Genoese means "mooring hold", and the Genoese had numerous such places on the shores of the Black Sea and on the banks of the Danube, including, in present-day Romania, Giurgiu and Licostomo, near Chilia Veche.

The discovery of the thesaurus of Barboși (southern quarter of the city of Galați, on the left bank of the Siret river), composed of 3,700 silver coins bearing the Greek inscriptions Gallati and Kallatiasy, will tip the scales towards the theory supported by Vasile Pârvan and Carl Patsch, which is the basis of the name of the Roman province Galatia in Asia Minor. The name Galați is also known as Kalas in Turkish, Γκαλάτσι in Greek and גאלאץ in Hebrew.

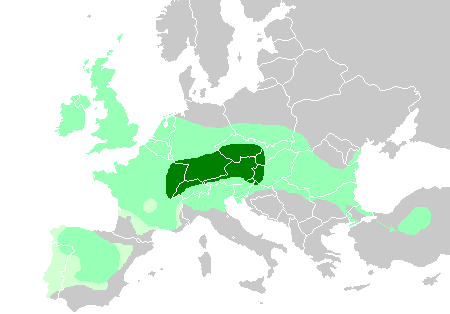
Diachronic distribution of Celtic peoples: The birthplace of the Hallstatt culture, in the 6th century BC. Celtic expansion at its height

But the followers of protochronism (pseudohistorical current which became very influential in Romania under the regime of Nicolae Ceaușescu) links the name Galați, even if it does not appear before the 14th century, to the Celtic root and Indo-European languages, [gall-] meaning "foreigner" (Gaul, gaulois, Gaulish, Galatia, Galicia, Galicia) (Note: In reality, the root [gal-] is not Celtic, but Germanic and formed the word walh denoting non-Germans (Celts or Romans).)" and being a derivation of Galatiens (the Greek name of the Gauls, on the grounds that this area, inhabited in antiquity by the Thracians from north (Dacians), also experienced the migration of the Celts. If ancient historians such as Herodotus really mention the presence of Celtic tribes in the Balkans and their migration to Anatolia in the 4th century BC, to found Galatia, Romanian protochronists, for their part, date the toponym Galați to the 23rd century BC, claiming that on the contrary, the proto-Celts would have migrated later from Anatolia to the Alps, where they developed Hallstatt culture in Europe. Also, they link the name Galați to the Tabula Peutingeriana from 1265 (map where, in addition to Galatia in central Anatolia, there is also Tanasia-Galatia north of the Black Sea) and state that the Celts of Galatia would be the population mentioned in the Bible in Paul the Apostle's Epistle to the Galatians. And according to them, genealogy studies with modern tools of molecular genetics would support their thesis.

However, the theory most accepted by historians is that the name Galați derives from old names of people, inhabitants of this area of the country. As Professor Păltănea also concludes, the onomastic value of the word Galați is proven by old inscriptions on which the names of people like Vasile Gălată, Petrea Galați, Marin Galați were found. In Romanian documents and chronicles, the name of the city is found in the form Gălați or Gălat, and in those from other countries it is mentioned as Gallaz, Galatz, Galazzo

— Ionel Cândea, Professor at the Faculty of History and Philosophy of the Lower Danube University in Galaţi

Finally, other hypotheses call for Slavic or Cuman etymologies. According to one, the inhabitants of Galicia - Ukrainians originally from the mountainous regions of the Carpathians - would have given the name to the city of Galați in the 13th century, when the Principality of Galicia-Volhynia expanded its area of commercial and political influence in Moldavia. This is the thesis favoured by Russian and Ukrainian historical circles. Also, the Serbs claim that the origin of the name is Galac. According to the other, the name derives from the Cuman galat, which appears, also from the 13th century, in other toponyms from the surroundings, for example Gălățui, a lake name whose suffix is Cuman (the suffix [-ui] means "water".

== Geography and environment ==
=== Boundaries ===

The county lies on a low plain, between the Prut River to the east, the Siret River to the west and southwest. Both flow into the Danube which forms the border with Tulcea County to the southeast.

Galați County is bordered by:

- Republic of Moldova to the East – Cahul District.
- Vrancea County to the West.
- Vaslui County to the North.
- Brăila County and Tulcea County to the South.

=== Geography ===
Located at the extreme east–central part of Romania, at the confluence of the Danube with the rivers Siret and Prut, Galați County has an area of 4,466.3 square kilometres (1,724.4 sq mi), which represents 1.9% of the country's surface. The county includes 4 urban centers (the cities of Galați and Tecuci, the towns of Târgu Bujor and Berești) and 61 communes comprising 180 villages. Confluence area between the Covurlui Plateau to the north (50% of the county's surface), the Tecuci and Covurlui plains (34%), and the lower Siret and Prut meadows to the south (16%), Galați County represents a unitary structure from the geomorphological point of view. The main watercourses are the rivers Danube, Prut, and Siret, the main lakes are Brateș 24 square kilometres (9.3 sq mi) and Tălăbasca. The maximum altitude is reached in the Fălciu Hills: 274 metres (899 ft).

=== Relief ===
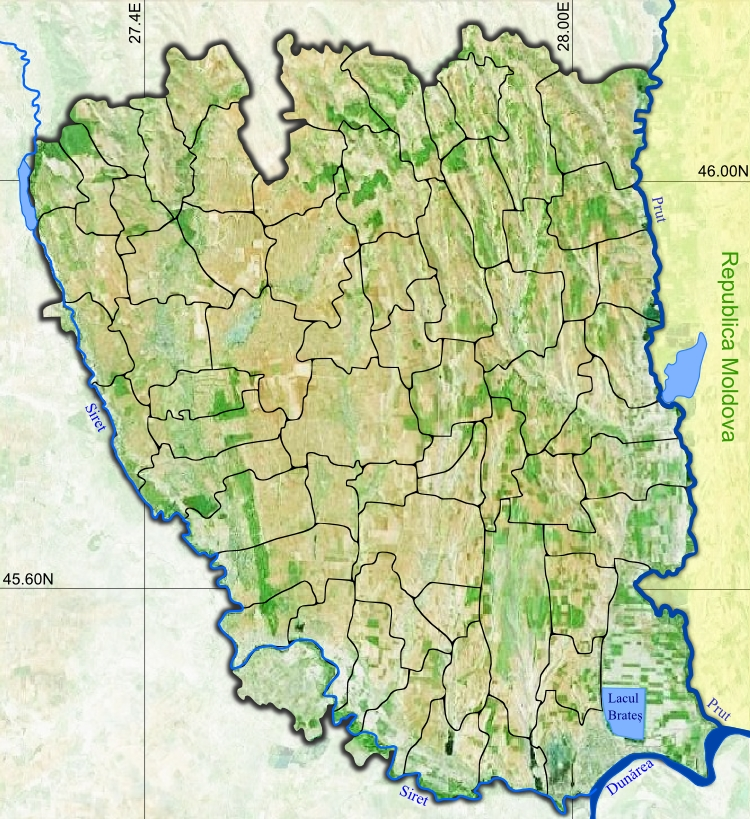
Subdivisions of Galați County

Due to its position on the outside of the Carpathian arc, Galați County occupies the area of interpenetration of the edges of the East-European, South-European and partly Central-European geographical sub-regions, which is faithfully reflected both in the climatic conditions, in the vegetation cover and soils, as well as in the geological structure of the relief. The latter offer a view with gentle heights ranging between 310 metres (1,020 ft) in the north and 5–10 metres (16–33 ft) in the south. The territory of Galați County itself presents a tabular (flat) relief with a more pronounced fragmentation in the north and weaker in the south;five geomorphological units can be distinguished, according to altitude, position and relief features: Covurlui Plateau, Tecuci Plain, Covurlui Plain, Low Siret Meadow, and Low Prut Meadow. The old geological formations are of little importance from the point of view of mineral resources. Hydrocarbons (crude oil and natural gas) have been identified and are being extracted in the areas Schela-Independența, Munteni-Berheci and Brateș. Young and especially Quaternary geological formations, consisting of common clays, sands, gravels are exploited in Galați, Tecuci, Braniștea and in the minor bed of the river Prut, having particular importance for the construction materials industry.

=== Nature reserves and nature monuments ===
The main natural reserve in Galați County is located on the sands of the Tecuci Plain, namely south of the town of Liesti, around the village of Hanu Conachi, on a strip of about 4 kilometres (2.5 mi) long and 05–1 kilometre (3.11–0.62 mi) wide with an area of about 84 hectares (210 acres) and which continues to the Siret meadow. A few distance from the city of Galați is the paleontological reserve of Barboși (Tirighina) with an area of about 1 hectare (2.5 acres), containing mollusk fossils from the old Euxine phase (about 400,000 years ago). Also, not far from Galați, namely to the north of the city, but on the Prut valley, on the territory of the commune Tulucești, in the place called Râpa Bălaia, there is the second paleontological reserve. The third paleontological reserve is located near the city of Tecuci, on the road Tecuci-Valea Mărului-Pechea-Galați, with a surface of 15 hectares (37 acres). The reservation is located on the lower terrace of the Bârlad river, at the point called La Rateș, where there was once an inn. In the eastern part of the county, on the territory of the Băneasa commune, between the villages of Băneasa and Roșcani, is the Băneasa Forest, where, in addition to the forest itself, the wild peony is also protected, on account of which legends were created and a great popular celebration that takes place every year, the "Peony Festival". Also, in the forest at Hanu Conachi, the "Acacia Festival" is held every year. These two reserves are not only scientific objectives, but also permanent attractions for tourists.

=== Climate ===
Climate data for Galați County
Month	Jan	Feb	Mar	Apr	May	Jun	Jul	Aug	Sep	Oct	Nov	Dec	Year
Record high °C (°F)	17.3 (63.1)	22.4 (72.3)	27.8 (82.0)	31.8 (89.2)	36.2 (97.2)	35.8 (96.4)	40.2 (104.4)	39 (102)	35.7 (96.3)	33.5 (92.3)	25.6 (78.1)	20.0 (68.0)	40.5 (104.9)
Mean daily maximum °C (°F)	1.1 (34.0)	3.0 (37.4)	8.9 (48.0)	16.6 (61.9)	22.3 (72.1)	25.9 (78.6)	27.9 (82.2)	27.5 (81.5)	23.5 (74.3)	16.9 (62.4)	9.4 (48.9)	3.4 (38.1)	15.5 (59.9)
Daily mean °C (°F)	−2.6 (27.3)	−0.9 (30.4)	4.0 (39.2)	10.8 (51.4)	16.5 (61.7)	20.4 (68.7)	22.5 (72.5)	21.9 (71.4)	17.3 (63.1)	11.3 (52.3)	5.2 (41.4)	0.1 (32.2)	10.5 (50.9)
Mean daily minimum °C (°F)	−5.3 (22.5)	−3.5 (25.7)	0.2 (32.4)	6.0 (42.8)	11.2 (52.2)	14.6 (58.3)	16.2 (61.2)	15.8 (60.4)	12.0 (53.6)	6.6 (43.9)	2.1 (35.8)	−2.4 (27.7)	6.1 (43.0)
Record low °C (°F)	−26.5 (−15.7)	−28.6 (−19.5)	−17.2 (1.0)	−5.2 (22.6)	−0.1 (31.8)	3.8 (38.8)	7.3 (45.1)	6.2 (43.2)	−1.5 (29.3)	−6.8 (19.8)	−17.4 (0.7)	−20.7 (−5.3)	−28.6 (−19.5)
Average precipitation mm (inches)	30 (1.2)	26 (1.0)	24 (0.9)	38.1 (1.50)	50.5 (1.99)	66.3 (2.61)	47.9 (1.89)	40.3 (1.59)	39.5 (1.56)	34.4 (1.35)	34.3 (1.35)	32.6 (1.28)	477 (18.8)
Average snowfall mm (inches)	9.0 (0.35)	7.9 (0.31)	6.4 (0.25)	0 (0)	0 (0)	0 (0)	0 (0)	0 (0)	0 (0)	0 (0)	10.4 (0.41)	7.0 (0.28)	40.7 (1.60)
Average snowy days	5	6	5	6	7	8	6	5	4	4	5	5	66
Average relative humidity (%)	50	48	35	28	29	32	31	31	31	35	42	50	36.8
Mean monthly sunshine hours	77.0	87.2	142.0	193.7	255.0	286.9	306.3	296.9	233.7	187.1	86.0	64.7	2,216.5
Source: "Anuarul Statistic al României 2022". Geografie, Meteorologie și Mediu (1901–2000) (in Romanian). Institutul Naţional de Statistică. 20 February 2023."Galați Climate Normals 1961-1990". National Oceanic and Atmospheric Administration. 21 March 2015. Archived from the original on 24 October 2020."Klimatafel von Galatz (Galati) / Rumänien" (PDF). Baseline climate means (1961-1990) from stations all over the world. Deutscher Wetterdienst. 23 November 2016.

Galați County

Climate chart (precipitation, max. and min. temperature)
J	F	M	A	M	J	J	A	S	O	N	D
30 1 −5	26 3 −4	24 9 0	38 17 6	51 22 11	66 26 15	48 28 16	40 28 16	40 24 12	34 17 7	34 9 2	33 3 −2
- █ Average max. and min. temperatures in °C
- █ Precipitation totals in mm
Imperial conversion
J	F	M	A	M	J	J	A	S	O	N	D
1.2 34 22	1 37 26	0.9 48 32	1.5 62 43	2 72 52	2.6 79 58	1.9 82 61	1.6 82 60	1.6 74 54	1.4 62 44	1.4 49 36	1.3 38 28
- █ Average max. and min. temperatures in °F
- █ Precipitation totals in inches

According to the Köppen climate classification, the territory of Galați County belongs entirely to the continental climate sector. The southern and central part, which represents more than 90% of the surface, is a plain area, and the northern extremity - which accounts for almost 10% of the territory - is a hilly area. In both climatic areas, summers are very hot and dry and winters are frosty, marked by strong blizzards, but also by frequent temperature changes caused by advections of warm and moist air from the S and SW that cause intervals of warming and melting of the snow cover. Against the general climatic background, the meadows of the Siret, the Prut and the Danube introduce into the values and regime of the main meteorological elements, changes that lead to the creation of a specific meadow topoclimate, wetter and cooler in summer and wetter and less cold in winter. The general circulation of the atmosphere has as its main features the relatively high frequency of slow advections of temperate-oceanic air from the W and NW (especially in the warm semester), the equally high frequency of advections of temperate-continental air from the NE and E (especially in cold season), as well as less frequent advections of arctic air from the N and tropical maritime air from the SW and S.

== Demographics ==
Historical population
Year	Pop.	±%
1948	341,797	—
1956	396,138	+15.9%
1966	474,279	+19.7%
1977	581,561	+22.6%
1992	641,011	+10.2%
2002	619,556	−3.3%
2011	536,167	−13.5%
2021	496,892	−7.3%
Source: Census in 1948, 1956, 1966, 1977, 1992, 2002, 2011, and 2021

On December 1, 2021, the population of the county was 496,892 inhabitants (down from 2011 when 536,167 inhabitants were registered), which represents 2.61% of the total population of Romania (the country's fifteenth county). Of that population, 242,055 are men and 254,837 women, with 259,071 living in urban areas and 237,821 in rural areas. The population density is 111.3/km^{2} (288.1/sq mi).

The seat of the county - Galați, the eighth largest city in Romania, with a population of 217,851 inhabitants, is the largest maritime port of the Danube on the territory of Romania, located at 80 kilometres (50 mi) from the Black Sea and approximately 250 kilometres (160 mi) from Bucharest and the cities of Iași, Ploiești, Constanța, Chișinău (Republic of Moldova), and Odesa (Ukraine).

=== Ethnic structure ===
The ethnic composition of Galați County in 2011
1. Romanians - 482,932 (90.1%)
2. Roma - 16,990 (3.17%)
3. Russian-Lipovans - 180 (0.03%)
4. Greeks - 156 (0.03%)
5. Hungarians - 133 (0.02%)
6. Other ethnicity - 477 (0.16%)
7. Information not available - 34,916 (6.51%)

According to the 2011 census, the ethnic structure of Galați County was relatively compact, with a high percentage of residents who declared themselves Romanian (90.07%), respectively 482,932 out of a total of 536,167. The second ethnic group in the number of inhabitants was that of the Roma - 16,990 (3.17%), followed by all the others (which did not exceed 1% of the total): Russian-Lipovans - 180, Greeks - 156, Hungarians - 133, Turks - 78, Italians - 68, Germans - 62, Jews - 57, Ukrainians - 48, Armenians - 29, Tatars - 4, Serbs - 8, Bulgarians - 7, Macedonians - 6, Poles - 3, other ethnic groups - 477. For 34,916 inhabitants (6.51%), the information was unavailable.

=== Citizenship ===
From the point of view of the citizenship of the county residents, on December 1, 2021, 496,048 were Romanian citizens (99.83%), Moldovan - 322, Italian - 123, Turkish - 37, British - 30, Ukrainians - 30, Spanish - 23, Greeks - 20, Syrians - 20, Germans - 14, French - 13, Americans - 12, Dutch - 8, Iraqis - 7, Serbian - 4, Hungarians - 3. 39 inhabitants were citizens of other European countries, and 125 of countries from other continents. 3 were stateless, and 7 did not declare their citizenship.

== Administration and Politics ==
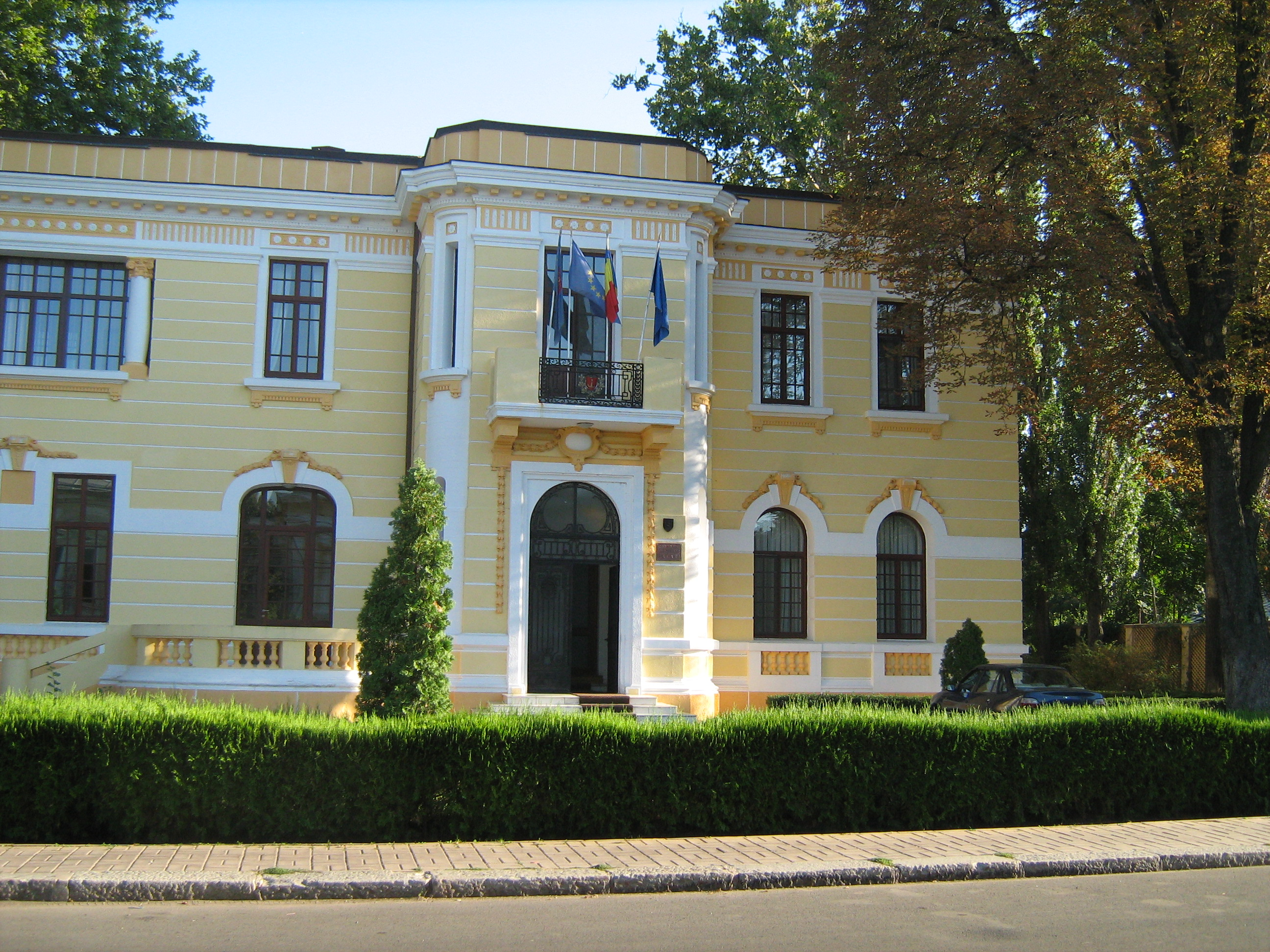
Headquarters of the Galati County Council

Galati County is administered by a county council consisting of 34 councilors. The president of the Galați County Council and the county councilors are elected locally, for a 4-year term.

Following the 2024 local elections, the council is chaired by Costel Fotea (PSD), which has been in office since June 2016.

The Galați County Council, renewed at the 2024 local elections, consists of 34 councilors, with the following composition:

Party	Seats	Current County Council
Social Democratic Party (PSD)	23	
National Liberal Party (PNL)	8	
Alliance for the Union of Romanians (AUR)	3	

== Administrative divisions ==
Galați County has 2 municipalities, 2 towns and 61 communes

Municipalities

- Galați – capital city
- Tecuci

Towns

- Berești
- Târgu Bujor

Communes

- Bălăbănești
- Bălășești
- Băleni
- Băneasa
- Barcea
- Berești-Meria
- Brăhășești
- Braniștea
- Buciumeni
- Cavadinești
- Cerțești
- Corni
- Corod
- Cosmești
- Costache Negri
- Cuca
- Cudalbi
- Cuza Vodă
- Drăgănești
- Drăgușeni
- Fârțănești
- Foltești
- Frumușița
- Fundeni
- Ghidigeni
- Gohor
- Grivița
- Independența
- Ivești
- Jorăști
- Liești
- Măstăcani
- Matca
- Movileni
- Munteni
- Nămoloasa
- Negrilești
- Nicorești
- Oancea
- Pechea
- Piscu
- Poiana
- Priponești
- Rădești
- Rediu
- Scânteiești
- Schela
- Șendreni
- Slobozia Conachi
- Smârdan
- Smulți
- Suceveni
- Suhurlui
- Țepu
- Tudor Vladimirescu
- Tulucești
- Umbrărești
- Valea Mărului
- Vânători
- Vârlezi
- Vlădești

=== Institutions ===
==== Medical institutions ====
The health units under the authority of the Galați County Council are the County Emergency Clinical Hospital Sfântul Apostol Andrei Galați, the Clinical Hospital for Infectious Diseases Sfânta Cuvioasa Parascheva Galați, the Pneumophthisiology Hospital Galați, the Municipal Hospital Anton Cincu Tecuci, and Târgu Bujor City Hospital.

==== Cultural institutions ====
The cultural institutions under the authority of the Galați County Council are Paul Păltănea History Museum in Galați, the Visual Art Museum in Galați, the Răsvan Angheluță Natural Sciences Museum Complex in Galați, the County Library V. A. Urechia Galați, the Cultural Center Dunărea de Jos Galați.

==== Educational Institutions ====
The educational structures under the coordination of the Galați County Council are the ones that form the school network organized in Galați County for special high school and special post-high school education, respectively the Technological High School Simion Mehedinți Galați, the Special High School Emil Gârleanu Galați, Special Professional School Paul Popescu Neveanu Galați, Special High School Constantin Pufan Galați, High School Saints Peter and Paul, and Special High School Constantin Păunescu in Tecuci.

==== Public institutions/services ====
The public institutions/services under the coordination of the County Council are the General Directorate of Social Assistance and Child Protection Galați, the County Public Service for the Administration of the Public and Private Domain Galați, the County Directorate for Records of Persons Galați and the Medical-Social Unit Gănești.

== History ==
The analysis of the succession and distribution of the archaeological evidence of material culture shows that the territory of the county was populated and entered the circuit of human use from prehistoric times. The oldest human remains in the Covurlui Plateau date from the Final Paleolithic and Epipaleolithic. Paleolithic cultures are located in Berești and Cavadinești. The Upper Paleolithic was highlighted in the north of the county, on the current territory of the villages Pleșa, Puricani, Crăiesti, Bălăbănești, Șipote, Rădești, Băneasa, Suceveni.

In the strategic archaeological succession, settlements from the old Neolithic, belonging to the Starčevo–Körös–Criș culture, which appear in the form of unfortified settlements, were also located. Traces of this culture were discovered at Negrilești and north of Tecuci, in the Bârlad River valley, at Munteni. In Berești, traces of the pre-Cucutenian and Cucutenian cultures were highlighted. The pre-Cucutenian culture is represented by bichrome and trichome painted ceramics at Stoicani, Măstăcani, Smulți, Drăgănești, Băneasa, Suceveni. The citadel of Stoicani shows, through the remains of material culture, the occupations of hunting, animal husbandry and plant cultivation practiced by the inhabitants of this territory, as well as some household crafts, such as pottery, spinning, weaving. The continuity of the population is proven by the material cultures belonging to the period of transition to the Bronze Age, represented by the "shack" type settlements from Stoicani.

The Iron Age left numerous material traces discovered and researched in more than 15 current localities, showing the penetration of some influences of the Greek civilization from Dobrogea. Thus, Greek ceramics and coins were discovered in Galați, Barboși (neighborhood of the city Galați) and Frumușita, and in Galați it seems that there was even a Greek settlement. The archaeological remains allow the reconstruction of an axis of the penetration of Greek civilization and material culture in the direction of Histria - the mouth of the Siret River - Barboși - Poiana - Trotuș - Oituz, which demonstrates the intensity of the material and spiritual activity of the natives.

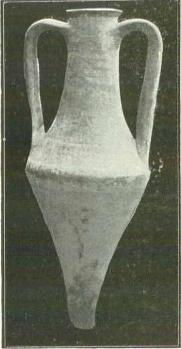
Amphora originated from Greek island of Thasos found at Poiana

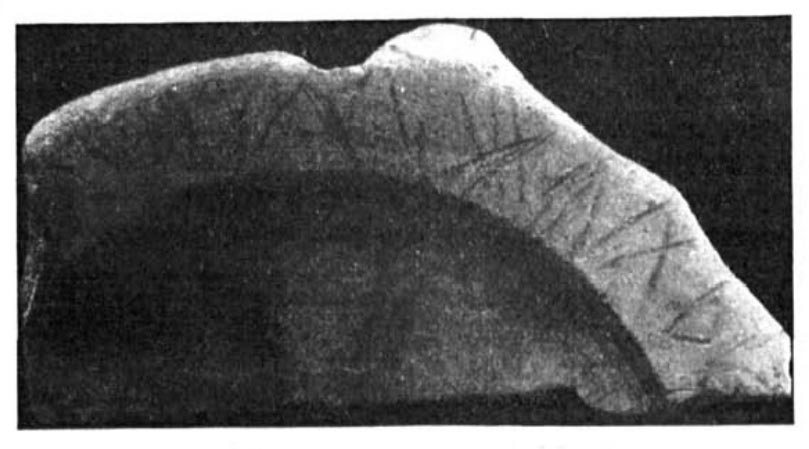
A fragment of a vase collected from Piroboridava (Poiana) illustrating the use of Greek and Latin letters by a Dacian potter (Note: Photo source: Revista arheologică și de istorie veche Dacia [Dacia: Archaeological and ancient history magazine], 1933)

The Geto-Dacian culture is represented by settlements located on the current hearths of Galați and Frumușița and by the Piroboridava settlement (Poiana). Roman life was particularly intense. The Roman military fort from Barboși and the civilian settlement on the hearth of the city of Galați today maintained trade links with Lower Moesia, with Greece and Asia Minor on the Danube and the Black Sea. In the 10th-13th centuries, forms of early feudalism, closely related to Byzantine influence, were registered on the current territory of Galați County, a fact attested by the numerous Byzantine coins discovered.

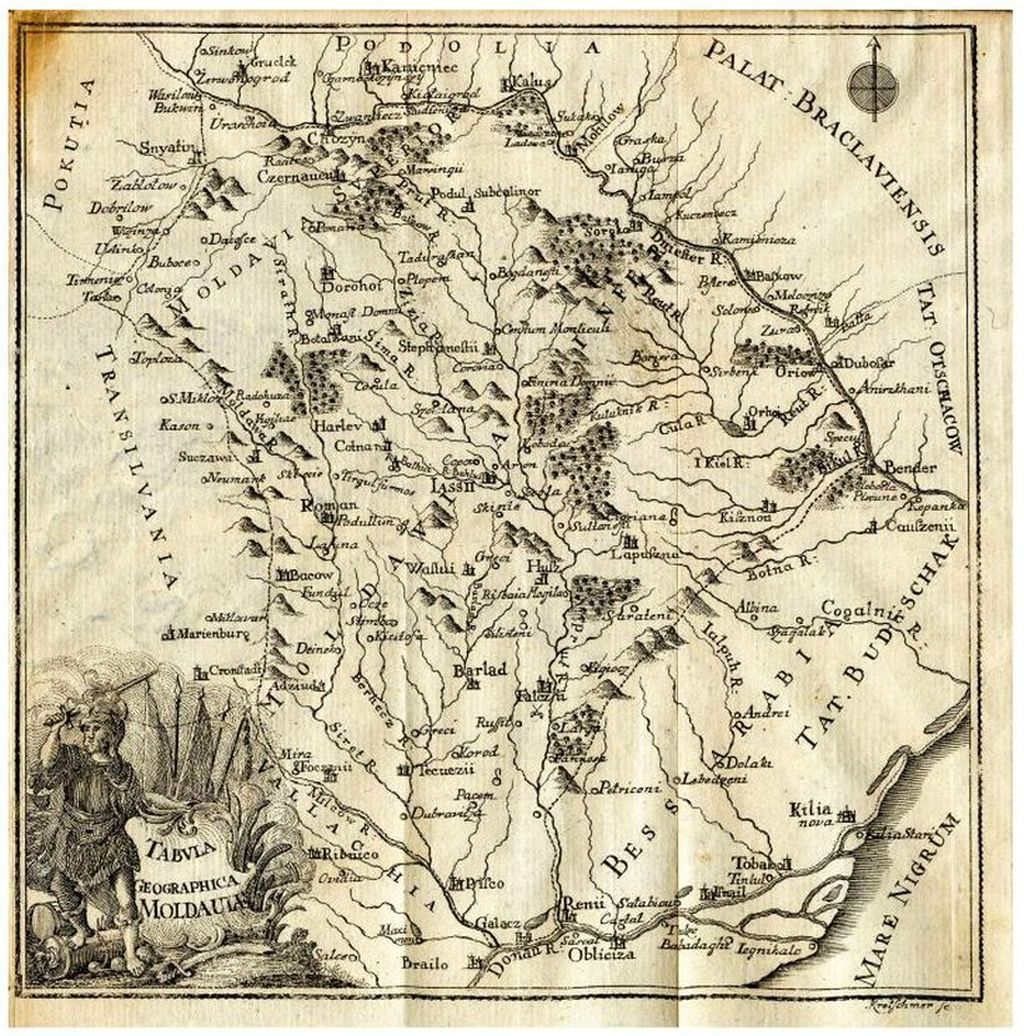
Map of Moldavia, part of the work of Dimitrie Cantemir Tabula Geographica Moldauiae - Descriptio antiqui et hodierni status Moldaviae, Frankfurt und Leipzig, 1771

In the XV-XVI centuries, numerous settlements are attested by written historical documents, such as Blăjerii de Jos (1448), Liești (1495), Șerbănești (1430), Bucești (1548), Drăgănești (1575), and in the 17th century Umbrărești (1649), Salcea (1695) etc. On the map of Dimitrie Cantemir from Descriptio Moldaviae, the settlements Nicorești, Poiana, Piscu, Corod, Oancea, Adam, Tulucești, Foltești, Tecuci, Galați are recorded.

At the end of the 17th century and the beginning of the 18th century, Slobozia-type settlements (Note: Slobozie was a settlement of colonists (natives or foreigners) who had, for a certain period, exemption from taxes or benefits) appeared, which lead to the thickening of the network of rural settlements, of which Slobozia Blăneasa, Slobozia Oancea, Slobozia Conachi, and Slobozia Corni still exist. In the second half of the 19th century, new rural settlements appeared as a result of the increase in the production of grain goods after the unification of the Romanian Principalities of 1859, the agrarian reform of 1864 and after the Rural Law of 1878. The different forms of population growth - migrations, agricultural herding, slow infiltrations and colonizations, immigrations (Lipovans, Greeks, Bulgarians, Armenians, Jews etc.) - contributed to changing the demographic structure of the county. Thus, the population growth was stimulated by the development of agriculture, by the liberalization of trade, by the intensification of transport, by the processes of free transfer by the state of land ownership rights to the peasants.

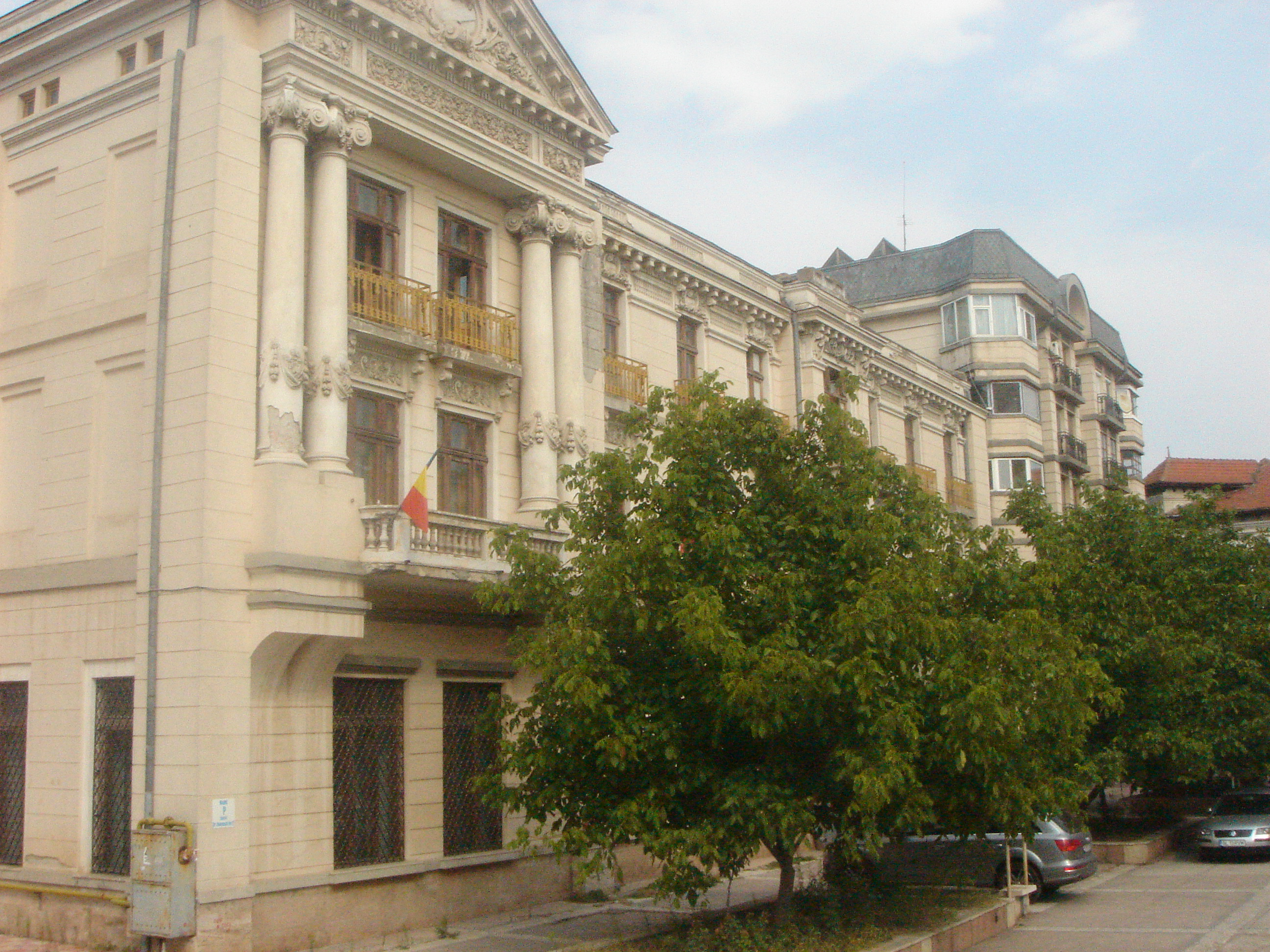
The house that belonged to the Cuza family and where Alexandru Ioan Cuza lived during the period when he was a judge and pârcălab (burgrave) of the Covurlui County, currently the seat of the History Museum Paul Păltănea in Galați

In the first half of the 19th century, social-political turmoil and numerous conflicts took place. They contributed to the acceleration of the process of disintegration of feudal relations and the emergence and emphasis of capitalist production relations. The popular masses of the county acted in the anti-Ottoman movement from 1821 and in the revolutionary ones from 1848. The active participation of the population of the former counties Covurlui and Tecuci in the political fight for the unification of the Romanian Principalities was determined, in large part, by the fact that two of the most important militants for unification lived and worked here: Alexandru Ioan Cuza, former pârcălab (burgrave) of Covurlui County, and Costache Negri (born in the village of Mînjina). At Mînjina, prominent personalities of the Romanian nation, such as Nicolae Bălcescu, Ion Ghica, Mihail Kogălniceanu, Vasile Alecsandri, Alecu Russo, and Grigore Alexandrescu participated in the development of unionist ideas.

== Economy ==
=== Economic profile ===
Galati County has an industrial-agrarian economy. Industrial units and those providing services are mainly concentrated in urban areas, while in rural areas the main activities are agricultural. The statistics regarding the number of merchants operating in the urban environment of Galați county show a significant concentration of them in the county seat municipality, where over 86% of them are found. The other municipality, Tecuci, gathers only 11% of merchants, while the towns of Berești and Târgu-Bujor have significantly lower percentages - 0.4% and 1.5% respectively.

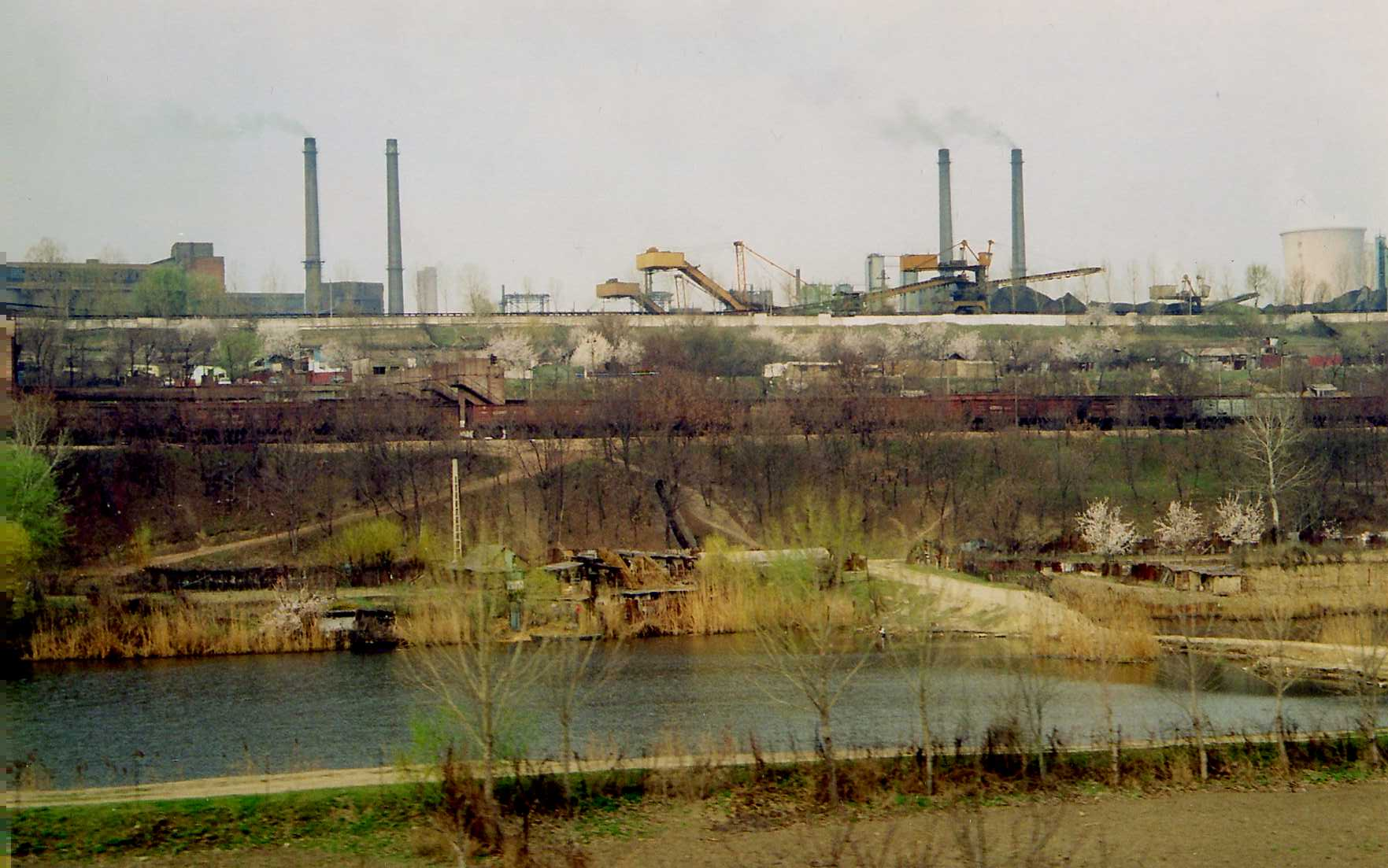
View of the Liberty Steel Works in Galați, its rail network and lake Cătușa

On the national economy as a whole, Galați county is the main producer of pig iron, crude steel, hot or cold-rolled sheets and strips, and the second in the production of maritime ships. The metallurgical industry in Galați (Liberty Steel Works) accounts for 55.6% of Romania's steel production, 55% of the production of rolled products and 90.4% of the production of cold-rolled sheets and strips. More than two-thirds of metallurgical production is exported. The naval industry (Damen Shipyard Galați), a branch of great tradition locally, produces river and sea vessels up to 65,000 tdw, as well as marine drilling platforms.

In the economy of Galați County, agriculture occupies an important place, due to the agricultural area in use, livestock and poultry and the technical potential in land improvement arrangements and equipment with tractors and agricultural machines. Galați County has 358,311 hectares (885,410 acres) of agricultural land, of which 292,926 hectares (723,840 acres) are arable, 43,612 hectares (107,770 acres) are pastures, 656 hectares (1,620 acres) are hayfields, 19,397 hectares (47,930 acres) are vineyards and wine nurseries and 1,720 hectares (4,300 acres) are orchards and fruit nurseries. The county also has 43,814 hectares (108,270 acres) of forests and other lands with forest vegetation, 13,231 hectares (32,690 acres) of lakes and ponds, as well as 3,554 hectares (8,780 acres) of other degraded and unproductive surfaces. In this context, agriculture is also a very important sector for the regional economy: about 40% of the employed population works in this sector, which contributes 16% to the regional GDP. Vegetable growers from the Tecuci area (especially those from Matca commune) and those from the Galați basin (Bădălan area and Vânători commune) are recognized for the quality of their products.

The county of Galați is also an important transport hub. Thanks to its location on the banks of the Danube and near the borders with Moldova and Ukraine, a multimodal transport hub for logistics transfer (ship-truck-train) is being built in Galați, which will lead to an increase in the volume of trade in goods with Eastern Europe and the importance of both the city and the county in terms of international trade.

If during the years of the communist era, Galați County had become the 4th largest industrial center of Romania, in recent years it has registered a sharp decline, which led to its inclusion, along with 5 other counties in Romania (Mureș, Prahova, Dolj, Gorj, Hunedoara) in the Just Transition Mechanism financed by the European Union, which attempts to reduce the social and economic impact of the transition of mono-industrial and coal-intensive regions to a decarbonized economy.

According to the statements of the President of the County Council, Costel Fotea (May 2022), "the transformation of steel production is an approach that will be carried out in a context where, in recent years, technological developments and market conditions have determined a decline in the degree of employment in the metallurgical industry of the county. Thus, the number of employees decreased by more than 36% in the period 2011-2020. The territory showed a sharp downward trend, of 6.5%, in the period 2012-2020, of the global population, while the downward trend of the working-age population was in the same period of 10.5%. Between 2010 and 2020, the average net salary was, each year, below the national average by about 11%, but the downward trend is clear. Between 2016 and 2020, the difference to the national average was -14%. The territory has an energy poverty rate of 55% in winter and 40% year-round. In December 2021, 10,626 unemployed persons were registered in the territory, of which 4,681 women. The unemployment rate was 5.65% in December 2021, nearly double the national average of 2.69%".

=== Statistical data ===
On May 1, 2023, the natural increase of the county's population was negative, respectively -695, the 6th highest in the country. From the point of view of the workforce, 121,433 employees (2.16% of the national total - 16th place) and 10,192 unemployed people (4.22% - 4th place) were registered in Galați county, and the average salary net was 3,703 lei - 15th place nationally.

Regarding the balance of international trade (FOB/CIF balance), in 2022, Galați county recorded a deficit of 377.4 million euros, after in the two previous years it had recorded a surplus of 96 and 55.5 million euro respectively.

Regarding the classification of economic activities in the county according to turnover in 2019, the first place is the activities of wholesale and retail trade, repair and maintenance of motor vehicles and motorcycles (41.79%), followed by those in the manufacturing industry (32.95%) and those from agriculture (9.71%) and construction (8.89%).

=== Tourism ===
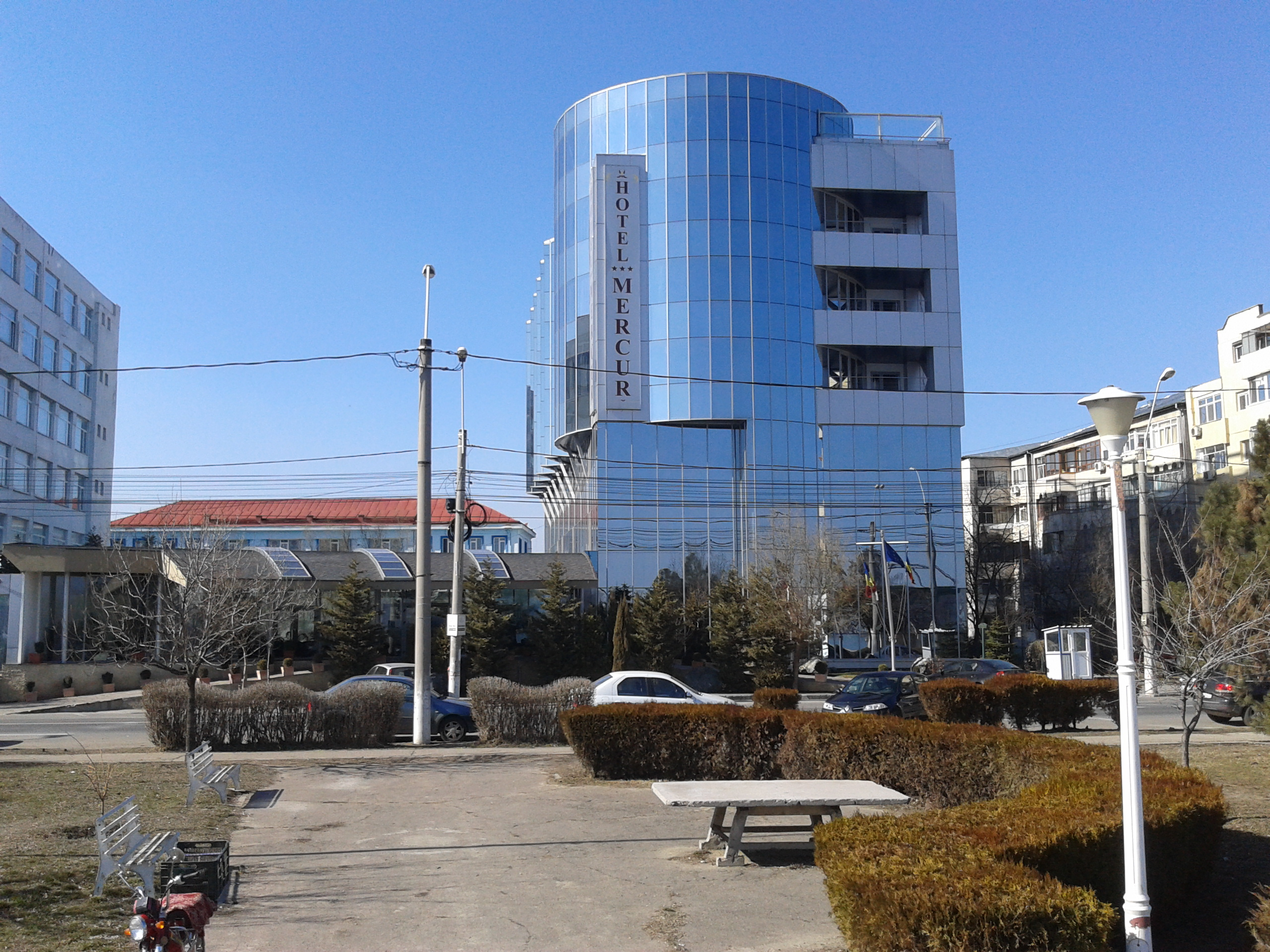
Hotel Mercur in Galați

In 2020, there were 51 tourist reception structures in the county, namely 17 hotels, 6 hostels, 5 motels, 6 tourist villas, 1 bungalow and 9 tourist guesthouses, with a total accommodation capacity of 2,196 beds. 51,673 arrivals and 84,786 overnight stays were registered, the net capacity utilization index in operation being 18.1%.

In 2022, Galați County registered 97,526 tourists and 151,886 overnight stays, an increase compared to previous years.

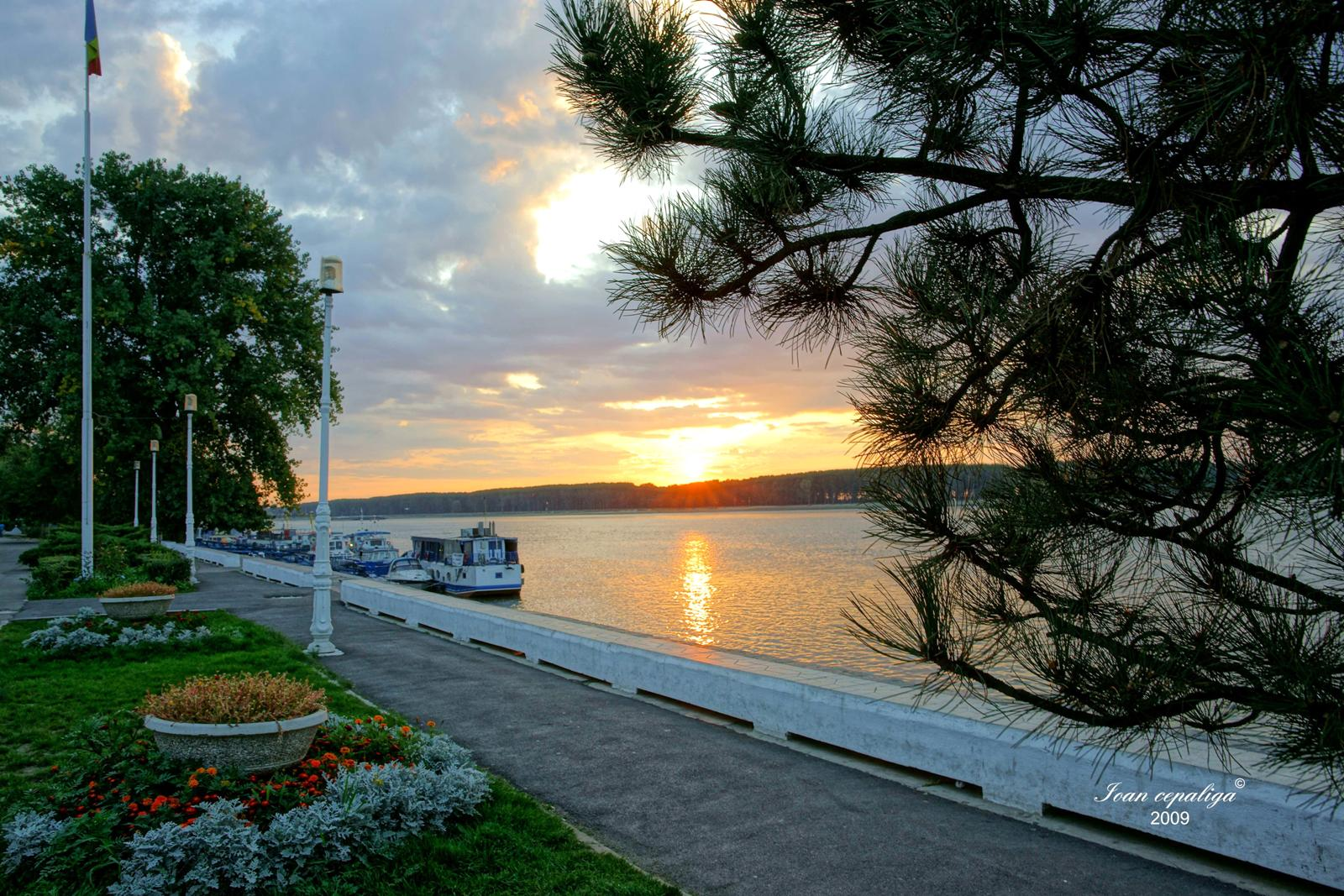
The lower embankment of the Danube in Galati

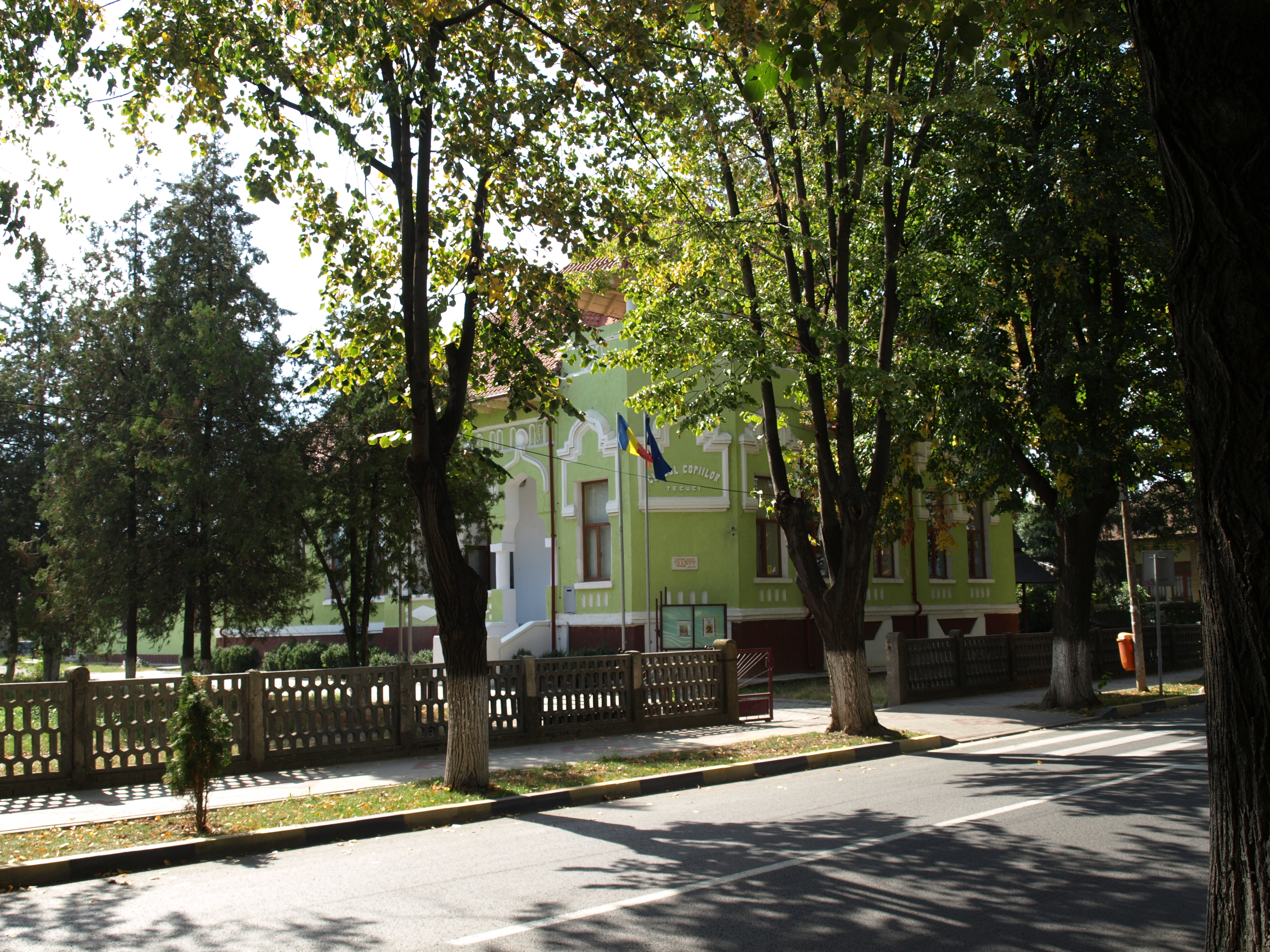
The former Prefecture of Tecuci County, currently the Children's Club in Tecuci

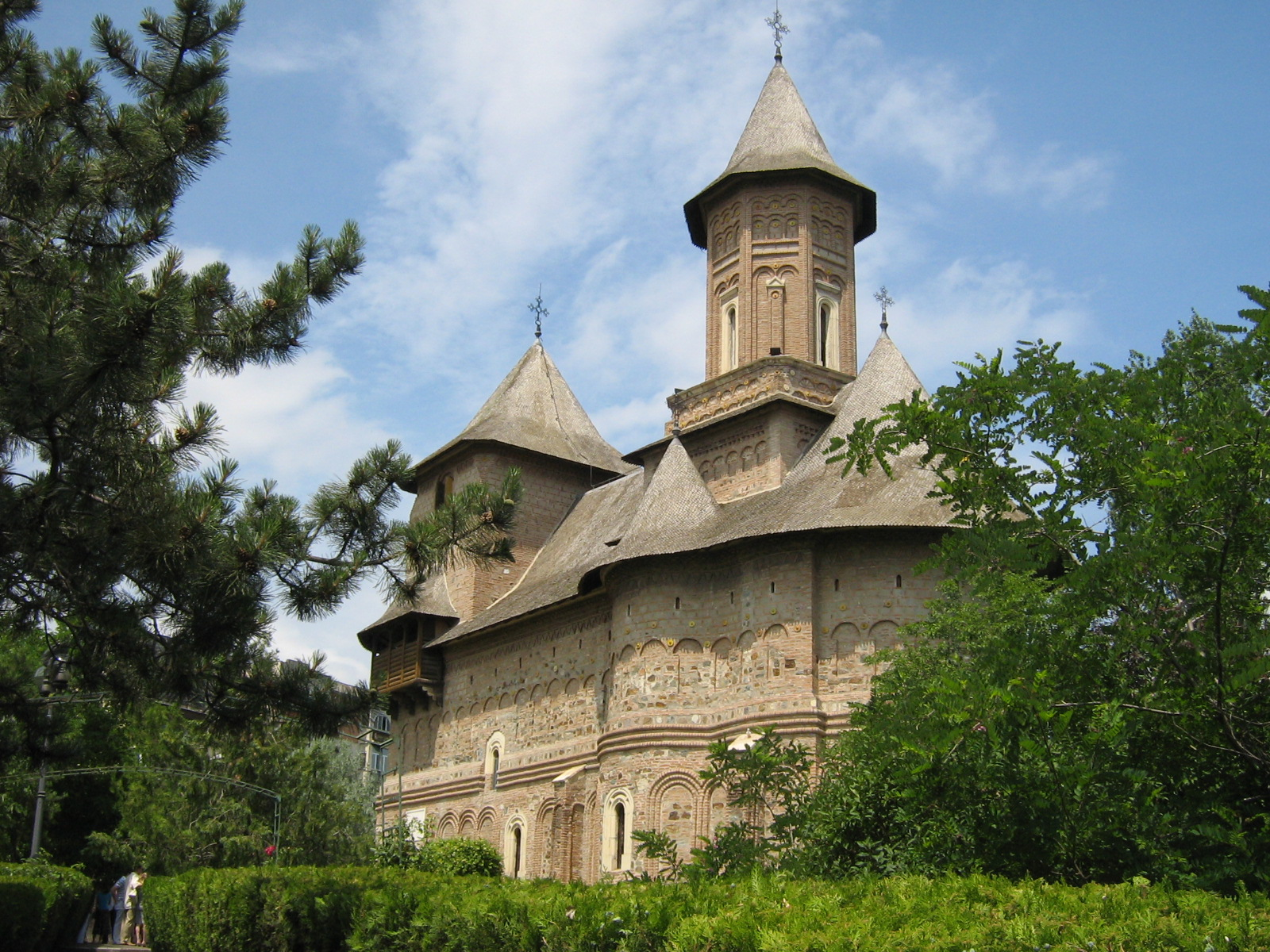
Precista fortified church in Galați

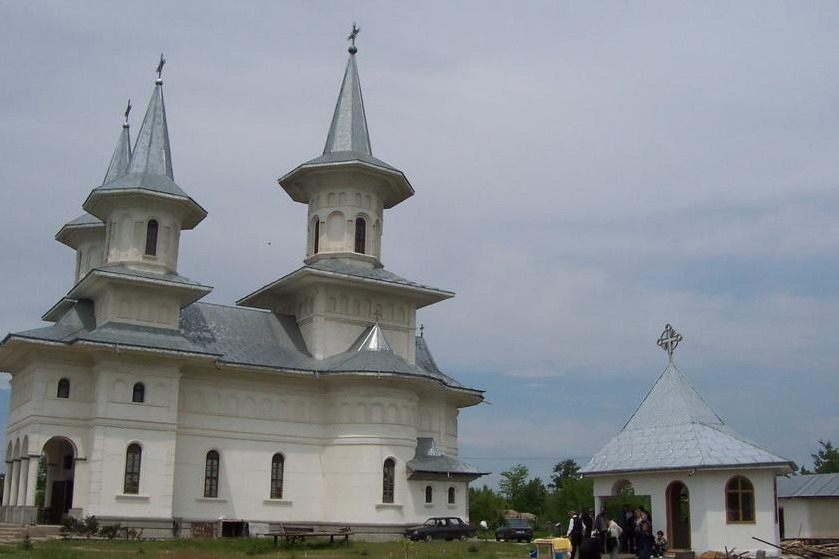
St. Nicholas Church in Liești

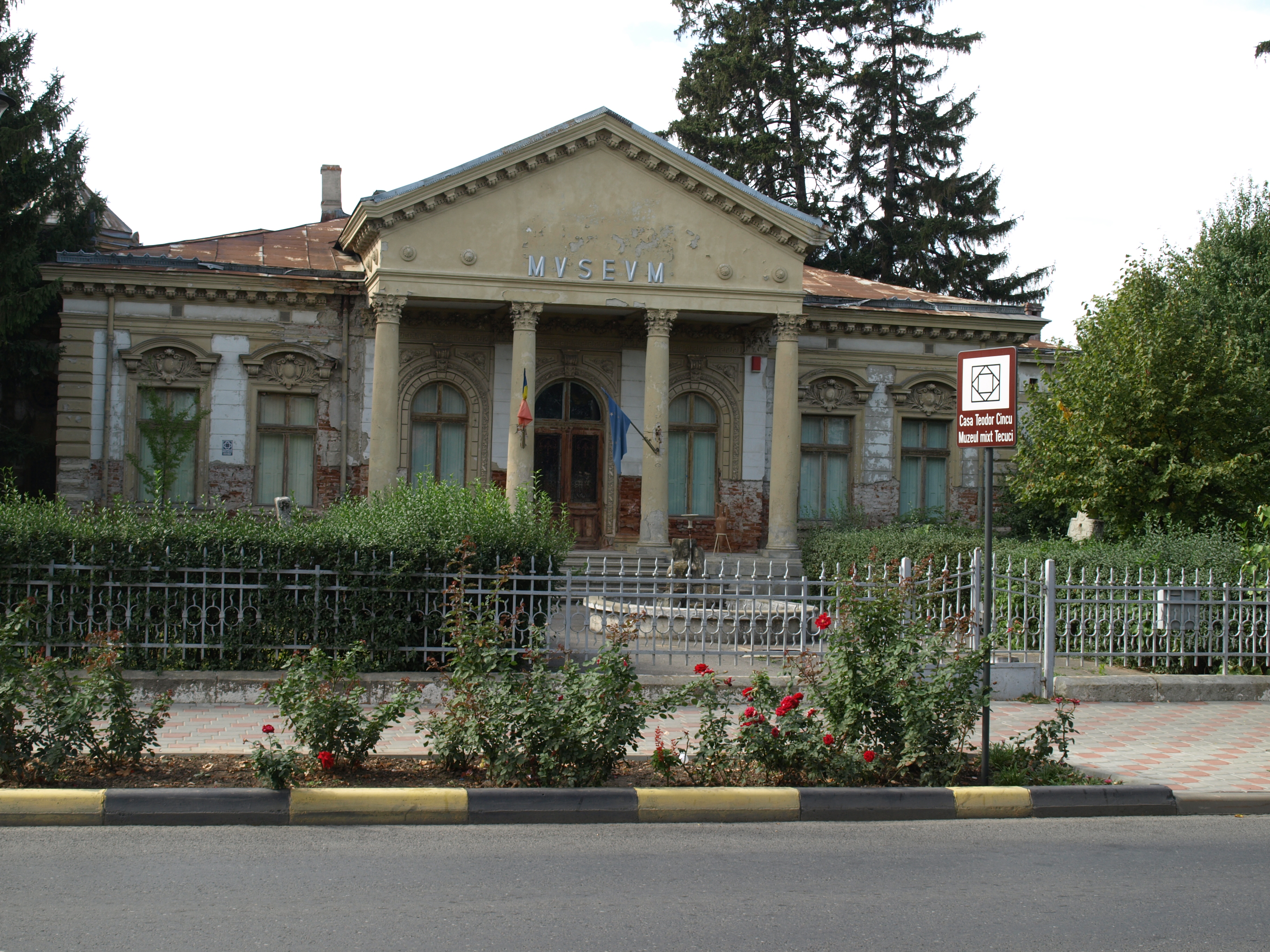
Teodor Cincu House, actually the Tecuci Mixed Museum

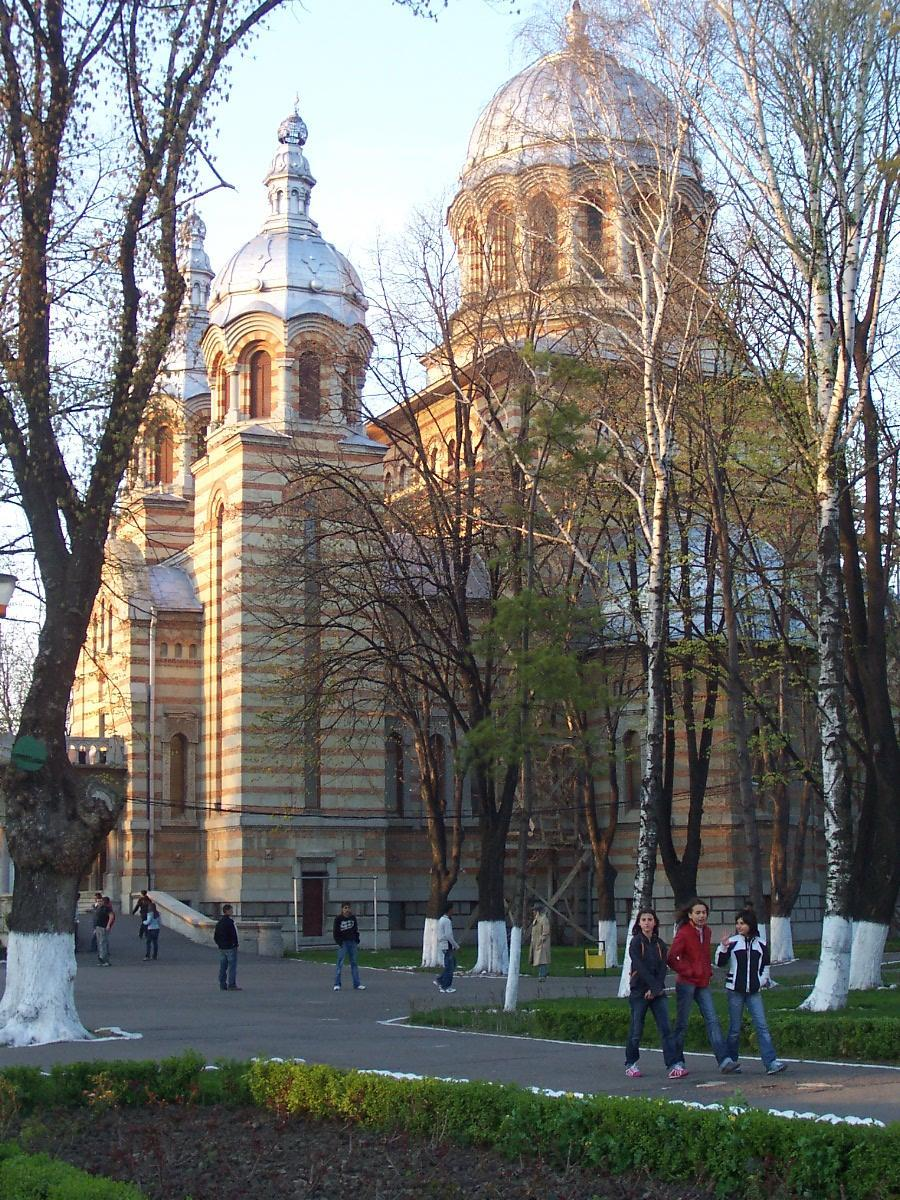
The Orthodox Cathedral St. George of Tecuci

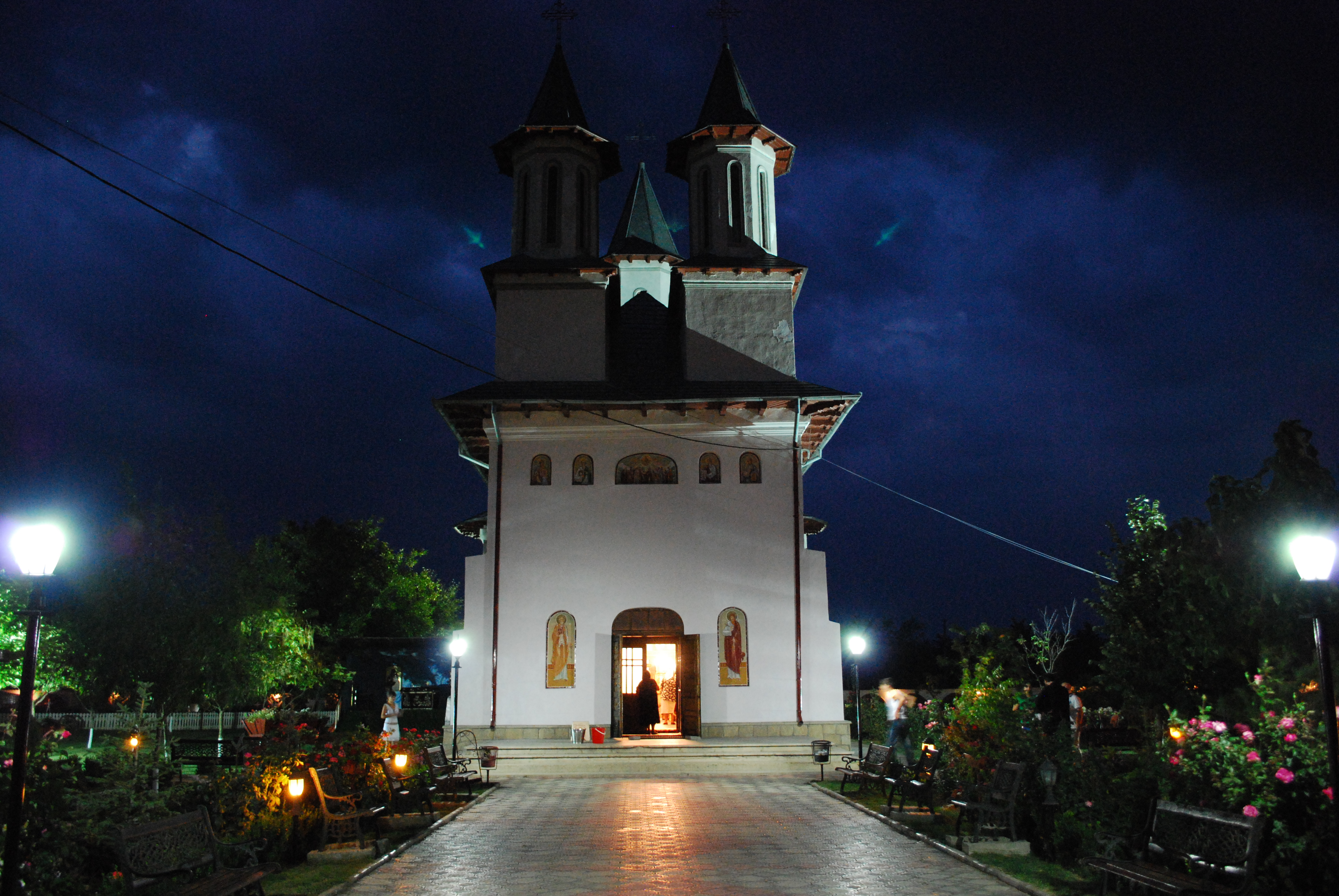
Ascension Church in Fundeni

== See also ==
- Administrative divisions of Romania
- 2010 Romanian floods
- 1977 Vrancea earthquake
