= Drăgănești, Galați =

Drăgănești
- Commune
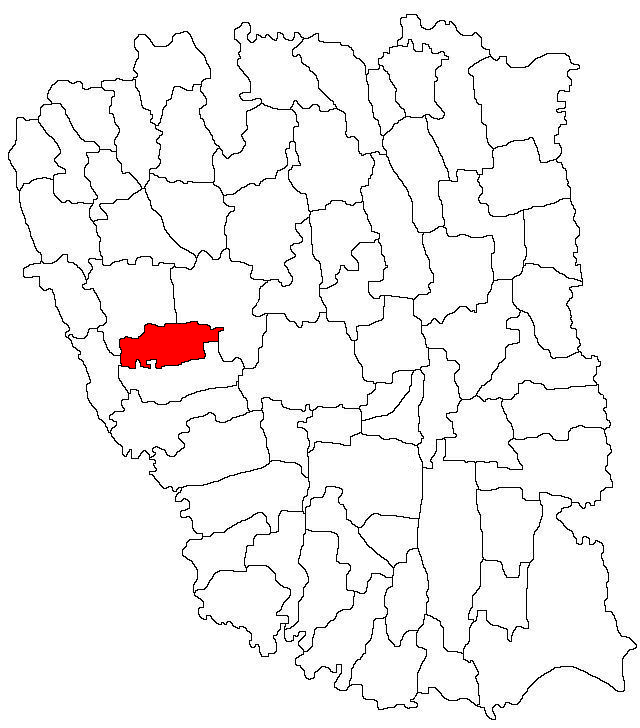
- Location in Galați County

- Location in Romania
- Coordinates: 45°47′N 27°28′E
- Country: Romania
- County: Galați
- Population (2021-12-01): 4,802
- Time zone: EET/EEST (UTC+2/+3)
- Vehicle reg.: GL

Drăgănești is a commune in Galați County, Western Moldavia, Romania with a population of 5,827 people. It is composed of two villages, Drăgănești and Malu Alb.
