= 1940 Galați massacre =

1940 mass killing of civilians in Romania

- Part of The Holocaust in Romania
- Location: Galați, Kingdom of Romania
- Date: 30 June 1940
- Attack type: Mass shooting
- Deaths: 80–400
- Perpetrator: Romanian military personnel

The 1940 Galați massacre was the mass killing of civilians by Romanian military personnel at Galați, in the Kingdom of Romania, on 30 June 1940, during the Romanian withdrawal from Bessarabia and Northern Bukovina following the Soviet ultimatum and occupation. Estimates of the number killed range from at least 80 to several hundred, with most of the victims being Jews.

== Massacre ==
The massacre occurred amid the chaotic Romanian evacuation of Bessarabia and Northern Bukovina after the territories were ceded to the Soviet Union in June 1940. Galați became a major transit point where refugees arriving from Bessarabia encountered people seeking to travel in the opposite direction into the newly Soviet-annexed territory. Those seeking to leave Romania included Bessarabians returning home, Jews, Russians and Ukrainians who had been working elsewhere in Romania, and some Polish Jewish refugees who had fled the German invasion of Poland.

Romanian authorities established an improvised transit camp near the railway station for people awaiting permission to cross into Soviet-controlled Bessarabia. According to historian Adrian Cioflâncă, those detained were kept for two days without adequate food or water and were subjected to searches during which valuables were confiscated. Tensions culminated in an altercation between guards and members of the crowd. After a shot was fired, other guards apparently believed that they were under attack and opened fire on the civilians.

Contemporary Romanian reports presented the incident as the suppression of a communist disturbance. A United States diplomatic report subsequently described approximately 2,000 people, mostly characterized as Jews and communists, becoming involved in a disturbance after the departure of their train was delayed. Although official reports acknowledged only a small number of deaths, contemporary observers estimated that several hundred people had been killed.

The exact death toll remains uncertain. Cioflâncă estimates that at least 80 people were killed, while some accounts place the number as high as 400; he attributes the uncertainty partly to bodies having been removed and buried in mass graves. The International Commission on the Holocaust in Romania estimated that roughly 300 civilians were killed, most of them Jews.

The massacre occurred one day before the Dorohoi pogrom of 1 July 1940. The Wiesel Commission identified the violence accompanying the Romanian withdrawal from Bessarabia and Northern Bukovina as part of the escalation of anti-Jewish persecution that preceded the mass killings carried out by Romanian authorities during the Holocaust in Romania.

== See also ==
- Bucharest pogrom
- Iași pogrom
