= Galați Cathedral =

Cathedral in Galați, Romania

- Catedrala Arhiepiscopală din Galați
- Galați Cathedral
- 45°26′50″N 28°03′17″E
- Location: Galați
- Country: Romania
- Denomination: Romanian Orthodox Church

History
- Dedication: Saint Andrew; Saint Nicholas

Architecture
- Architects: Petre Antonescu; Ștefan Burcuș

Specifications
- Length: 37 m (121 ft)
- Height: 42.5 m (139 ft)

The Galați Cathedral (Romanian: Catedrala arhiepiscopală din Galați) is a Romanian Orthodox cathedral in Galați, Romania. It is the see of the Lower Danube Archdiocese, and dedicated to Saint Andrew and Saint Nicholas. It was built between 1906 and 1917 and is a symbol of the city. The cathedral has a length of 37 m and a height of 42.5 m.

In 2006, the centenary of the Episcopal Cathedral of Galați was celebrated, on which occasion the relics of Saint Nectarios of Aegina arrived in the city.

== History ==
The cornerstone of the cathedral was laid on April 27, 1906, by then-Prince Ferdinand and Princess Marie, alongside the bishop of the Lower Danube, Pimen Georgescu, the future metropolitan of Moldavia, the construction lasting until 1917 and being carried out according to the plans of architects Petre Antonescu and Ștefan Burcuș.
