= Galați =

- County seat and Municipality
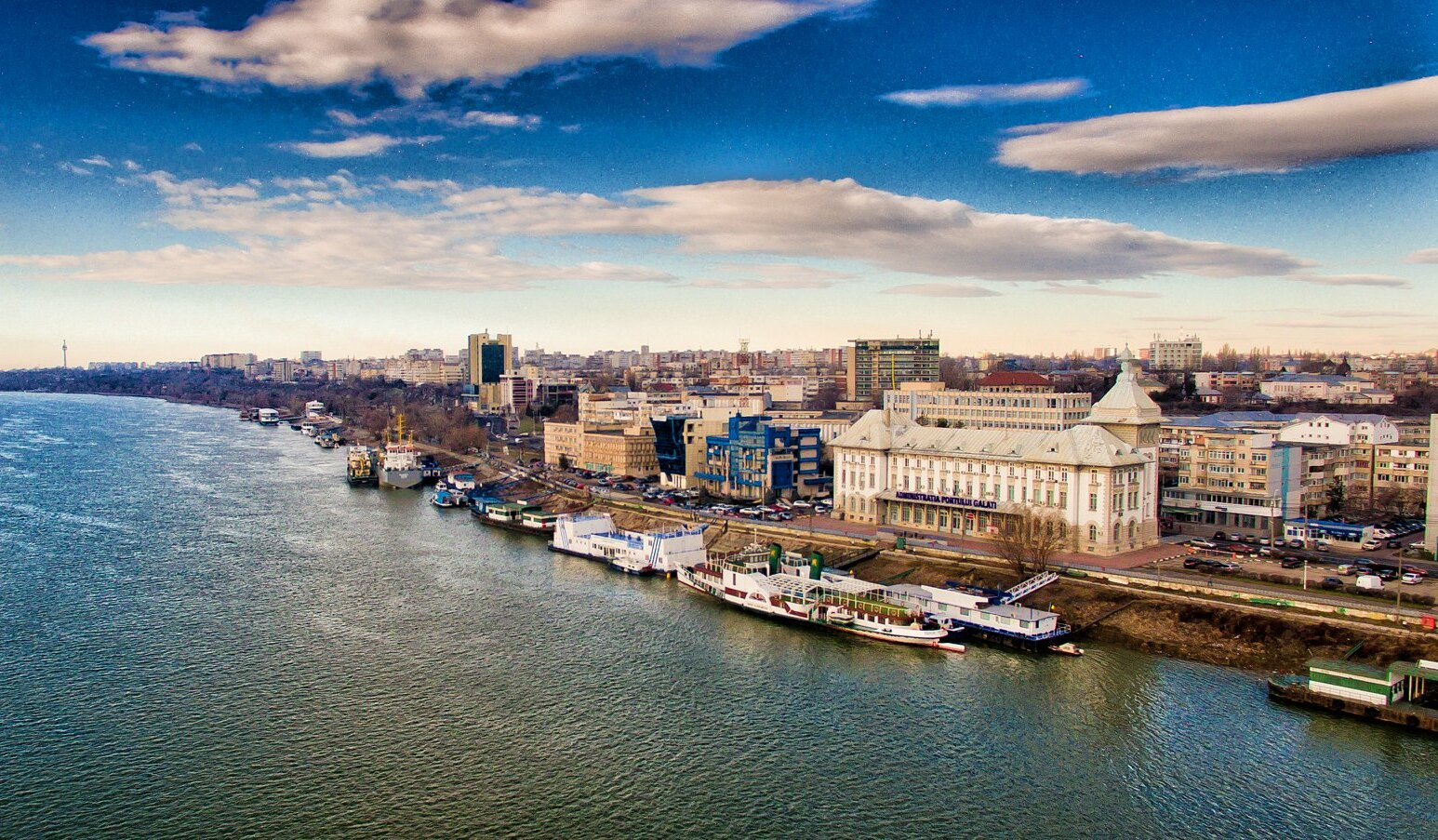
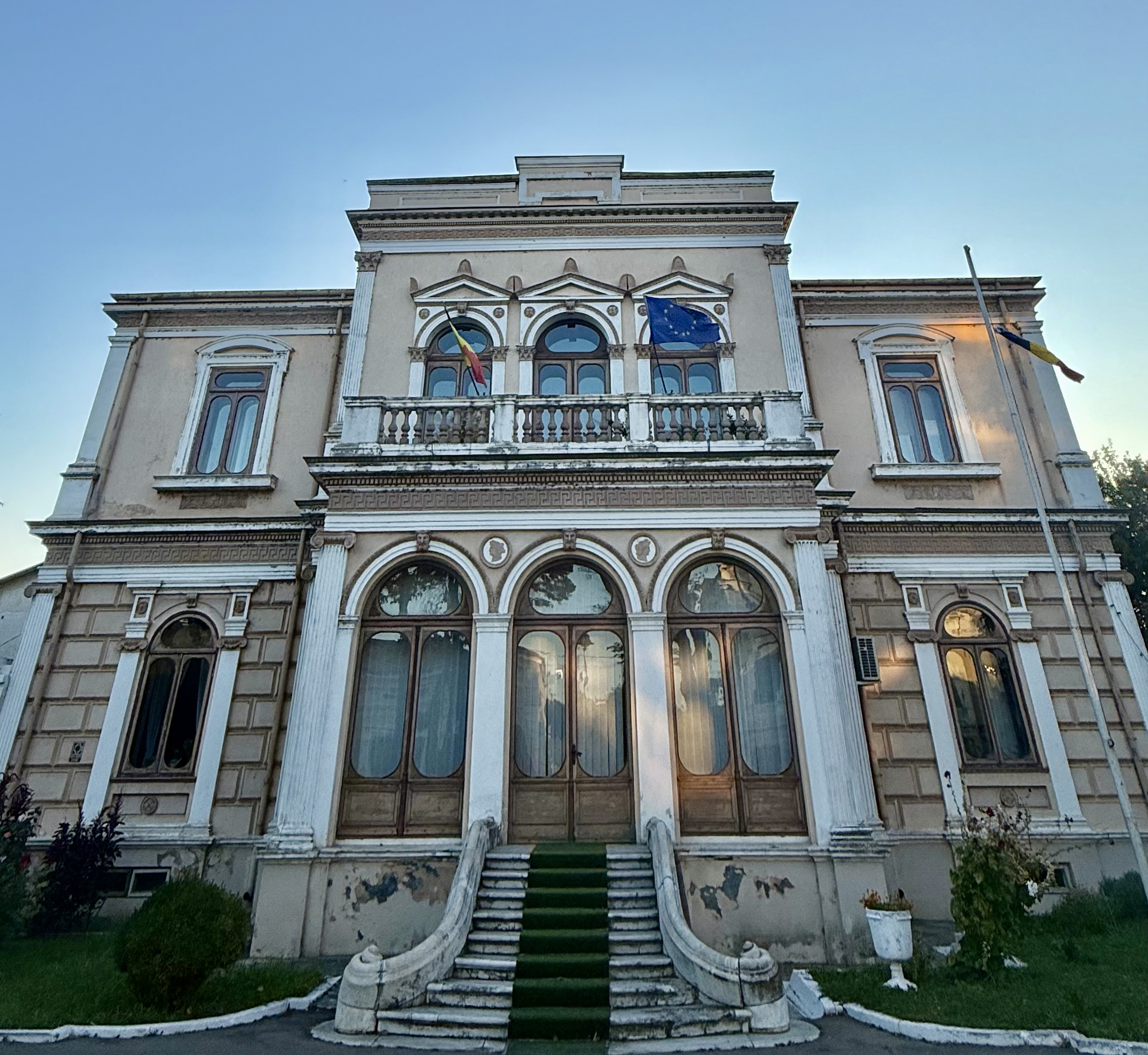
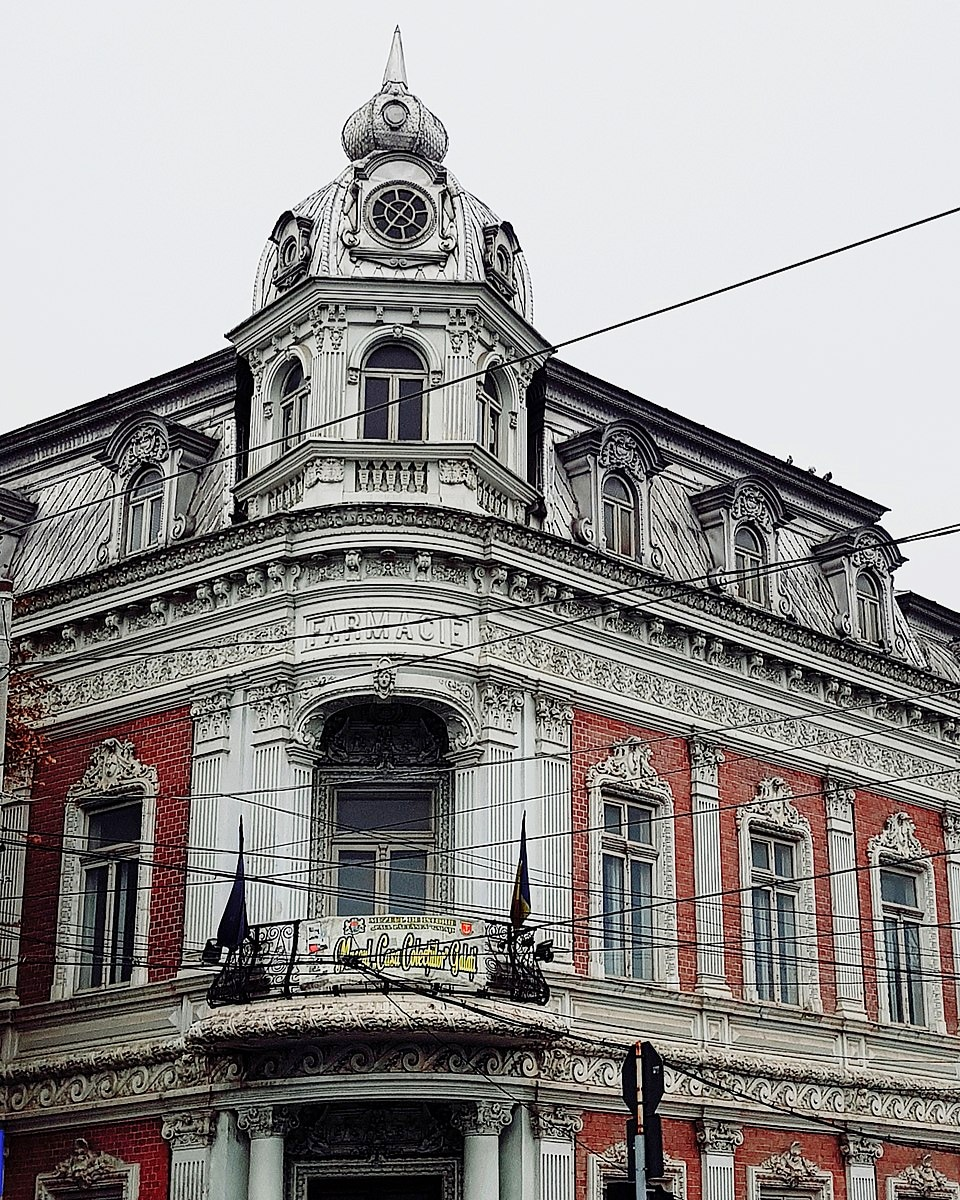
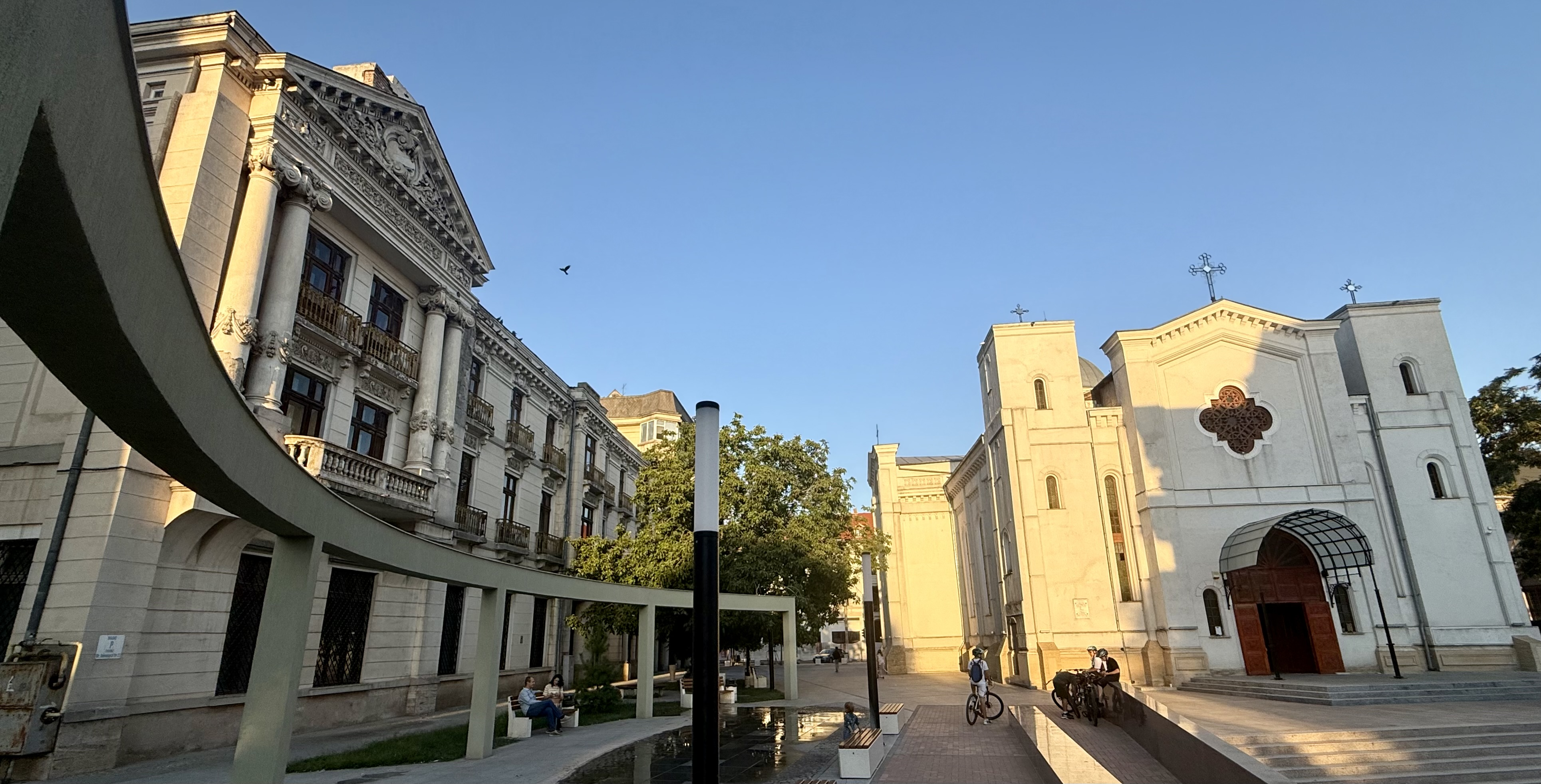
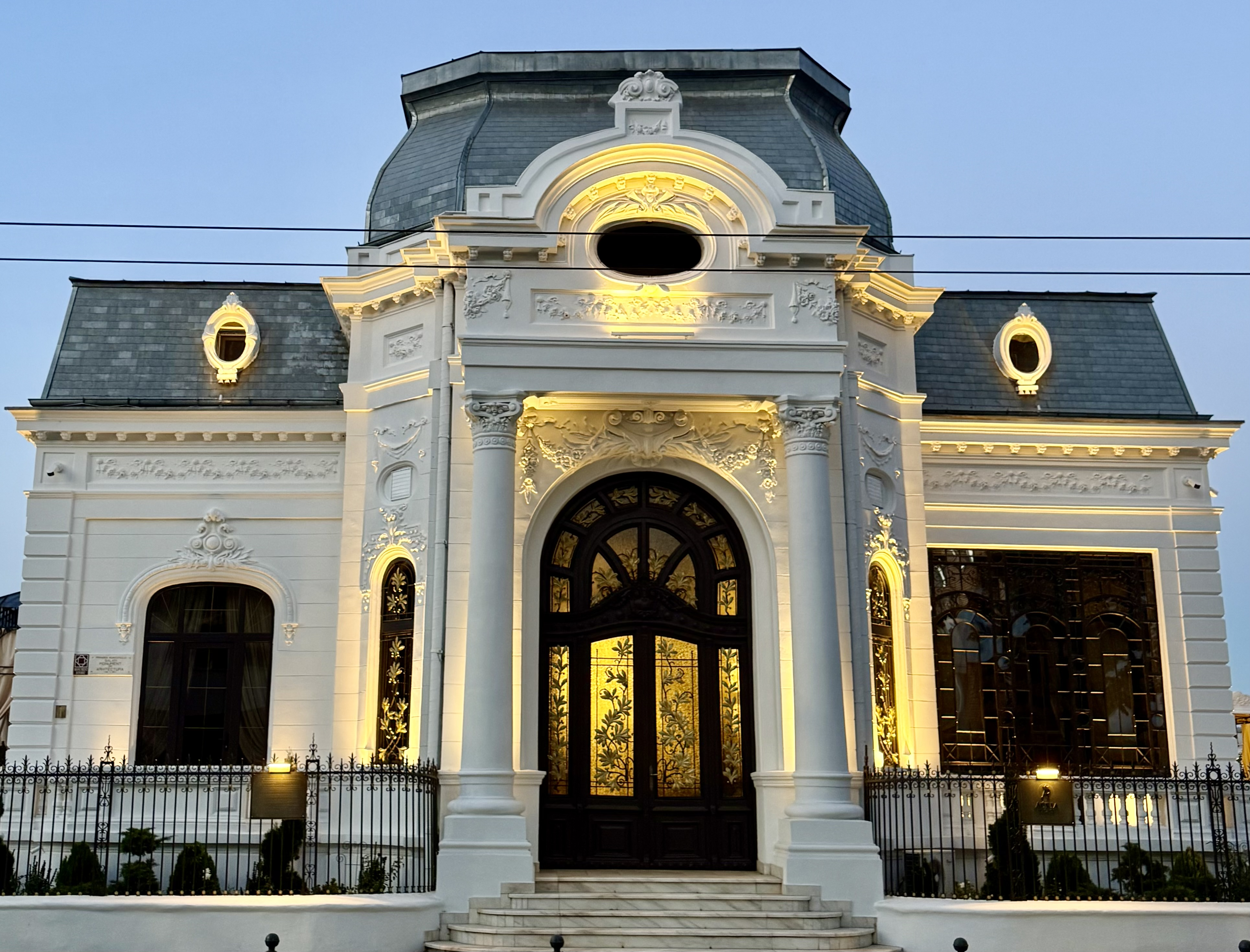
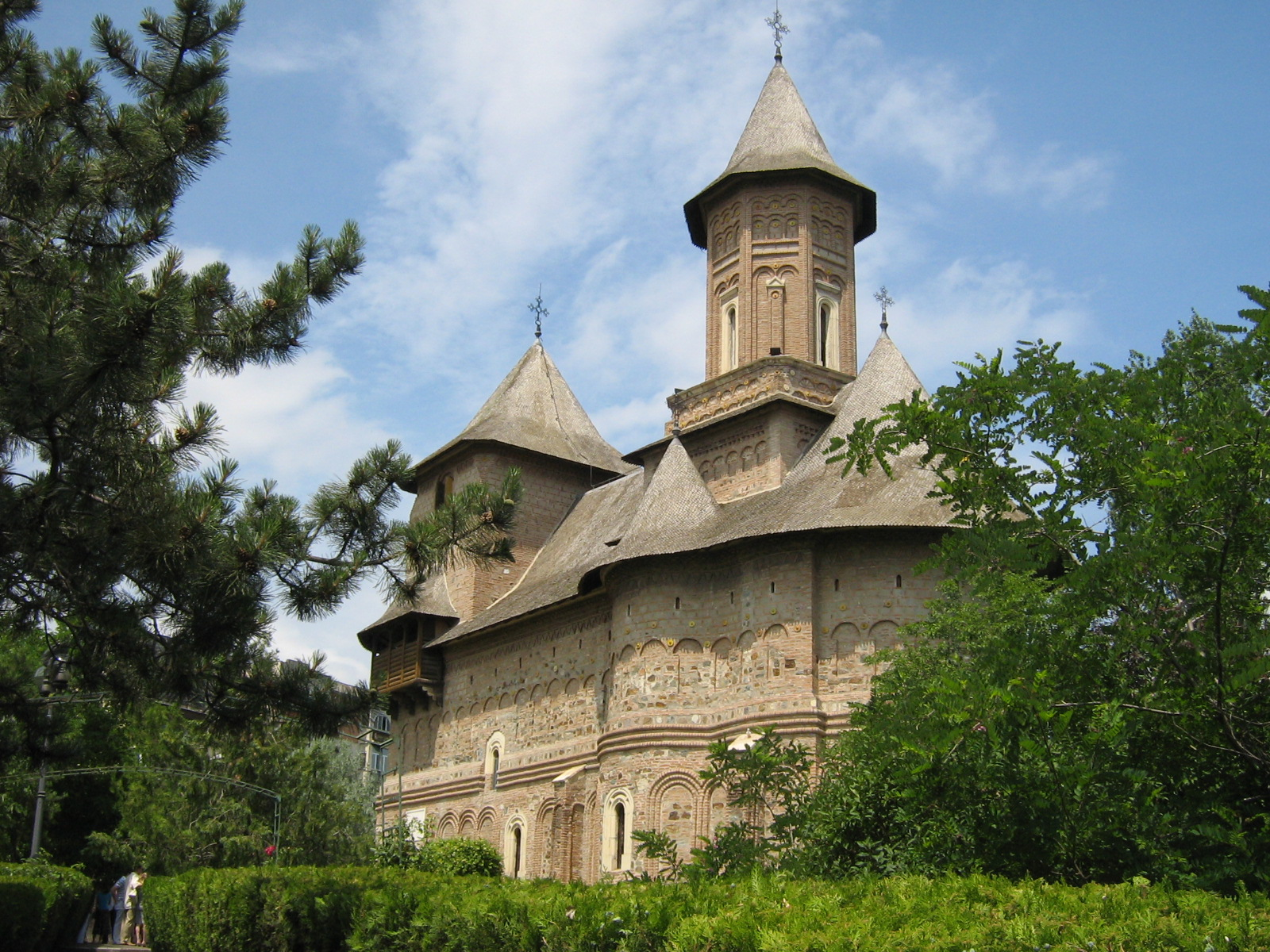
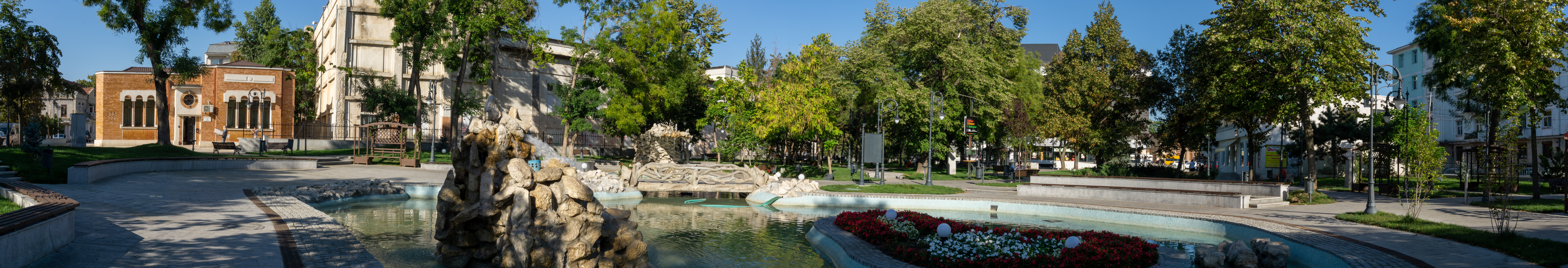
- The Danube and the Navigation Palace Administrative Palace of Galați Lambrinidi House Collections house Greek Church Square Max Auschnitt House Fortified church of the Virgin Mary Eminescu Park Panorama

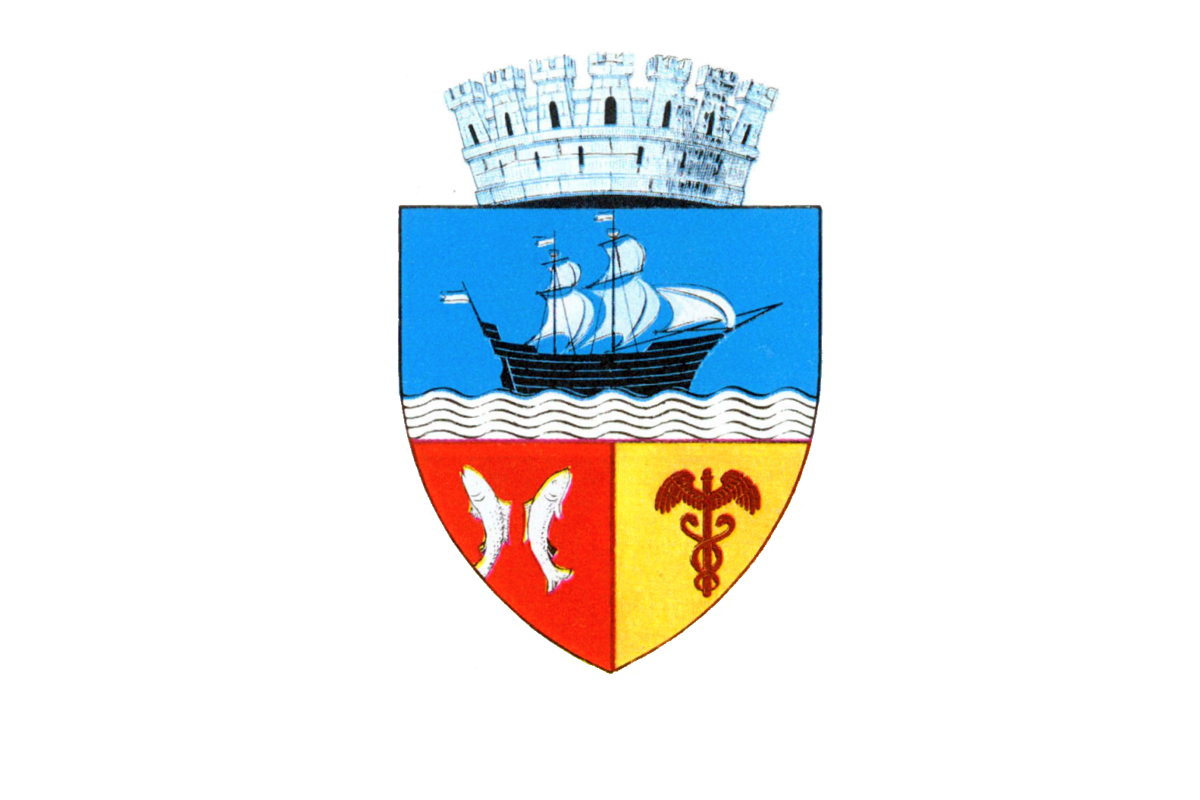
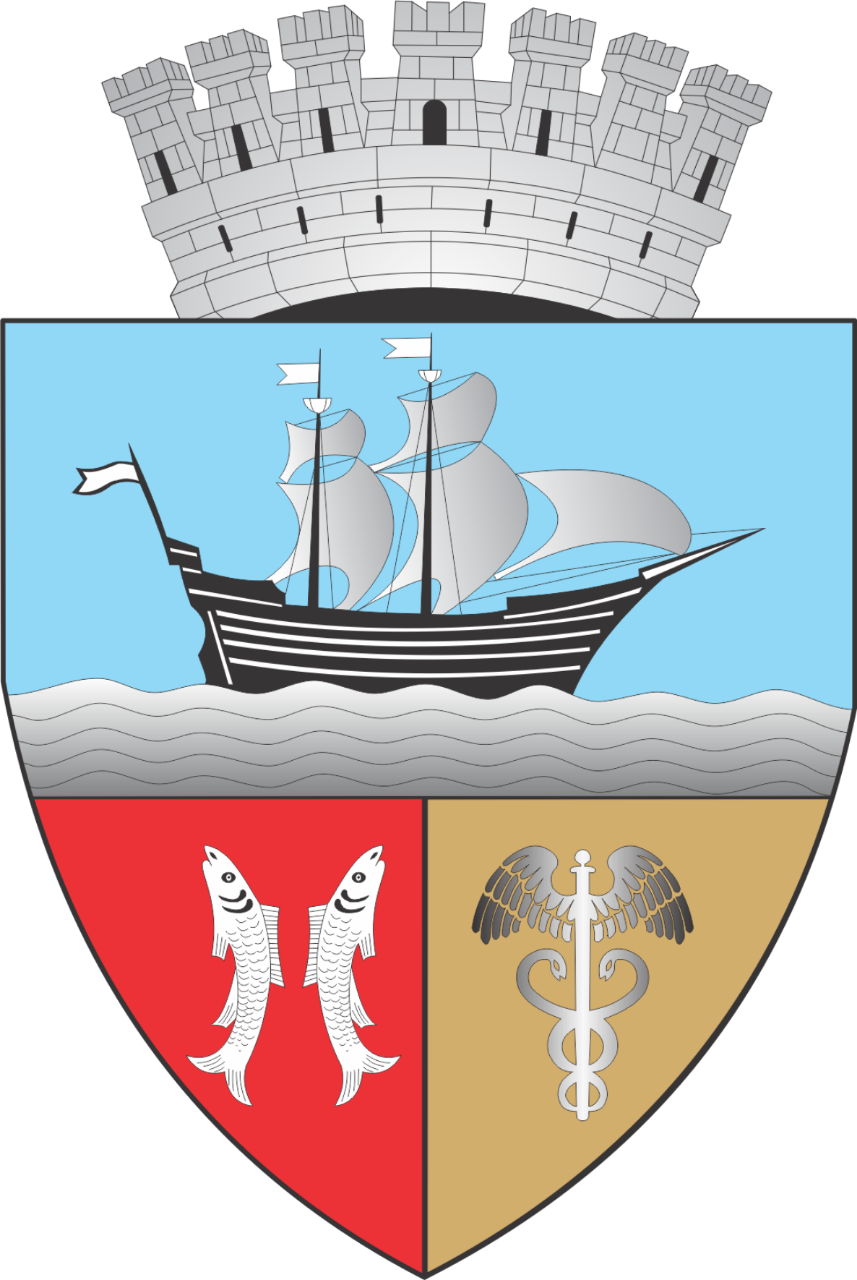
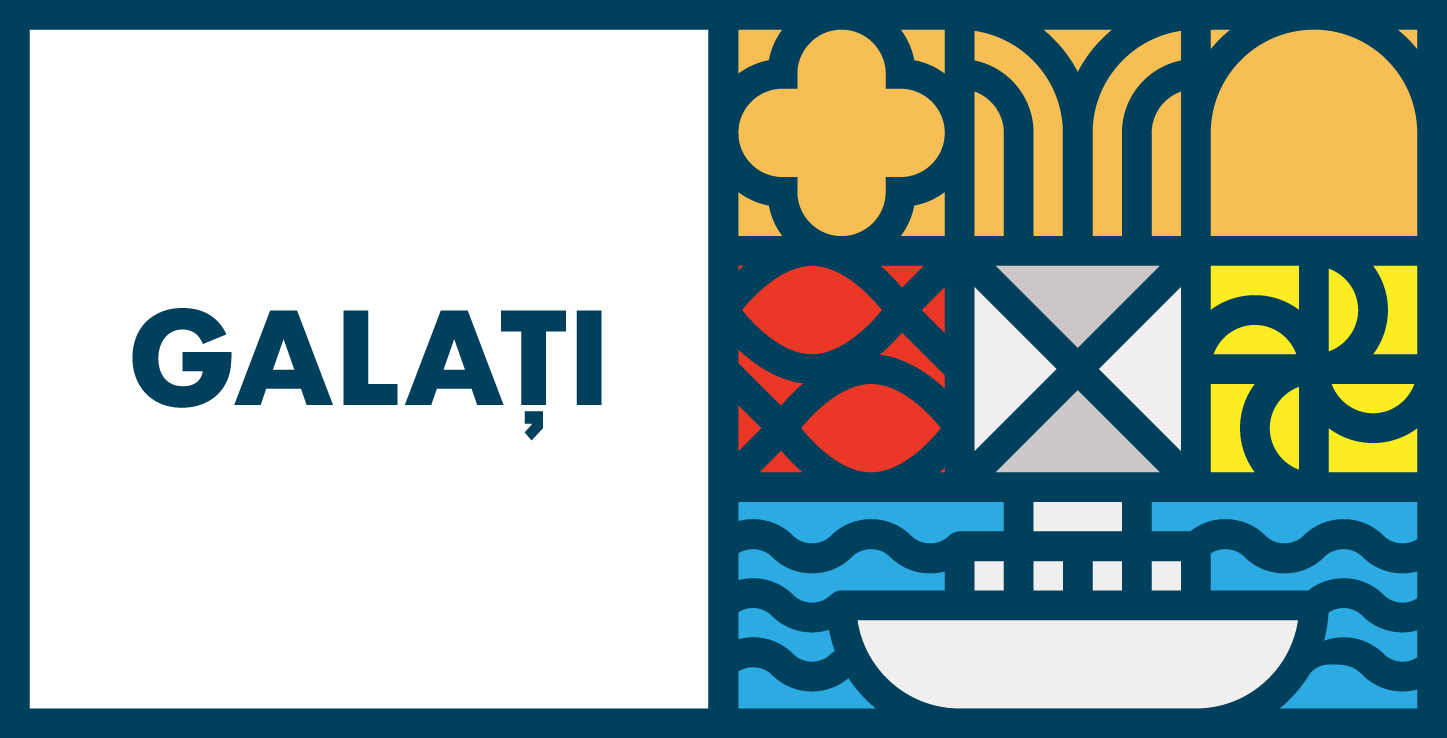
- Flag Coat of arms Brandmark
- Nicknames: The city of the linden trees
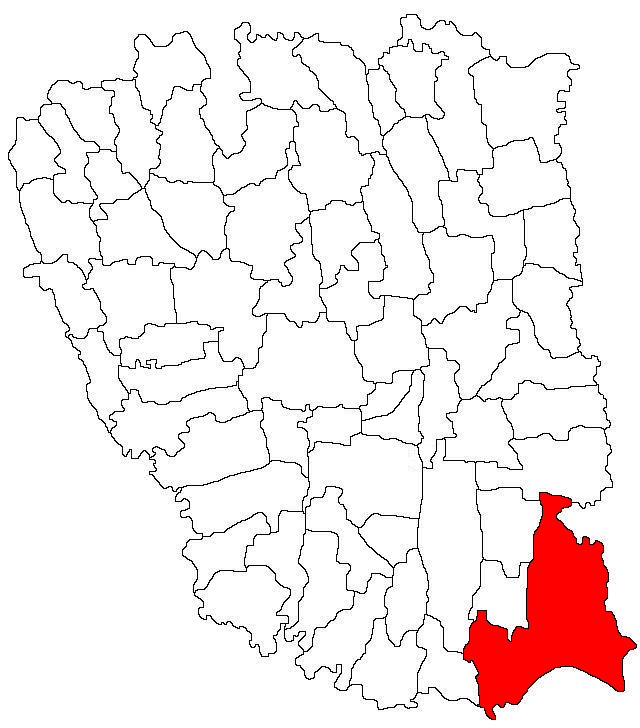
- Location in Galați County

- Location of Galați within Romania
- Coordinates: 45°26′1″N 28°3′19″E
- Country: Romania
- County: Galați County
- Status: County capital
- Settled: Before 14th century
- First official record: 1445

Government
  - Mayor (2024–2028): Ionuț Pucheanu (PSD)

Area
  - County seat and Municipality: 246.4 km^{2} (95.1 sq mi)
- Elevation: 55 m (180 ft)

Population (2021 census)
  - County seat and Municipality: 217,851
  - Density: 884.1/km^{2} (2,290/sq mi)
  - Metro: 322,501
- Demonym(s): gălățean, gălățeancă (ro)
- Time zone: UTC+2 (EET)
  - Summer (DST): UTC+3 (EEST)
- Postal Code: 800xxx
- Area code: +40 x36
- Car Plates: GL
- Website: www.primariagalati.ro

Galați (UK: /ɡæˈlæts/ gal-ATS, US: /ɡɑːˈlɑːts(i)/ gah-LAHTS(-ee), Romanian: [ɡaˈlatsʲ]; also known by alternative names) is the capital city of Galați County in the historical region of Western Moldavia, in eastern Romania. Galați is a port town on the river Danube. and the sixth-largest of all cities on the river Danube. According to the 2021 census it is the 8th most populous city in Romania. Galați is an economic centre based around the port of Galați, the naval shipyard, and the largest steel factory in Romania, Galați steel works.

== Etymology and names ==
The name Galați is disputed in origin. One theory suggests it is perhaps derived from before the Mongol invasion of Rus', in which Galați was known as Malyi Halych ('Little Halych') as part of the Kingdom of Galicia–Volhynia. Another prominent theory suggests it is derived from the Cuman word galat, derived from the Persian 'kala', an Arabic borrowing meaning "fortress". Apart from these two, other theorists suggest the root "gal" may have came from an old Slavic word, meaning "muddy", which later underwent a semantic transformation, acquiring the meaning of "black". Thus, the adjective "gal", through the suffix "aț" was substantivized, similar to another theory which suggests a link with Serbian galac. The region of Galatia in Turkey, has also been used to explain its etymology due to the presence of some historic archaeological findings in the city.

Galați has several exonyms: Greek: Γαλάτσι, romanized: Galátsi; German: Galatz (also an archaic English term); Hungarian: Galac; Polish: Gałacz; Turkish: Kalas; Bulgarian: Галац, romanized: Galac; Ukrainian: Галац, romanized: Halac; and Russian: Галац, romanized: Galac.

== History ==
Historical affiliations

Moldavia 1408–1859
United Principalities of Moldavia and Wallachia 1859–1862
Romanian United Principalities 1862–1866
Romania 1866–1881
Kingdom of Romania 1881–1947
Romanian People's Republic 1947–1965
Socialist Republic of Romania 1965–1989
Romania 1989–present

=== Ancient origins ===
Archeological evidence points to occupation of the region in the Neolithic period. For example, northwest of the town of Galați, on the eastern shores of the Malina marshes, fragments of ceramic-type Stoicani Aldeni, stilex and tools made of bone have been found. A stone sceptre, from the late Bronze Age, belonging to the Coslogeni culture was found on the marshes' southern bank. Galați town itself developed from an ancient Dacian settlement of the sixth and fifth centuries BCE where there was a ford across the Danube river. In 101 to 102 and 105 to 106, the Dacians fought wars against the Romans and the area became part of the Roman empire. A strong Roman fortress was built at Barboși to defend the ford across Danube. From the 300s a Daco-Roman settlement developed at a ford south of the site of the Church of the Virgin.

=== Medieval period ===
There is evidence of continuous inhabitation of Galați since the 600s. A treasure hoard consisting of 12 silver coins issued between 613 and 685 was found in a Byzantine tomb near the Church of the Virgin. Western and Byzantine coins from the time of Emperor Michael IV (1034–1041) were also found. At one time, the city became part of the Republic of Genoa Territories and was called "Caladda". In 1445, a document signed by Stephen II of Moldavia mentions Galați. In 1484, Chilia was conquered by Ottomans. Galați township remained Moldova's only port, not only for domestic trade but also for trade with Turkey and Poland.

=== Early modern period ===
In 1590, the Galați Jewish cemetery was opened.

The Ukrainian Cossack Hetman Ivan Mazepa, who died on 1709 in Varniţa, Bessarabia, was buried in Galați. He was buried in a brick tomb.

In 1710, Tatars plundered Galați after the Russo-Moldavian failure at the Battle of Stănilești.

In 1775, Russia established a consulate in Galați. Despite this, the city was nonetheless burned by the armies of the Russian general Mikhail Kamensky during the Russo-Turkish War of 1787–92.

=== 19th century ===
In 1812, following the annexation of half of the Moldavia by Russia, including all of the sea shore and almost all of Danube, Galați ended up as the Moldavia's only port.

Due to unrest in this part of Europe, Galați port became a site for the construction of large warships. Abbot Boskov, a Romanian traveller, stated:

"I saw a large boat, the way those who say Turks caravels, which is on site, ready to be launched into the water. He was commissioned by Isaac-aga, big tax collector of Constantinople. The ship was huge, seventeen seventy steps, and loaded with eighty-four bronze cannons."

As the Greek Revolution begun in the region, specifically in Iași, Galați was also a significant core of the revolutionary organization Filiki Eteria and led by Vasilios Karavias there were conflicts against the Ottomans in 1821. On 30 May 1821, an the first battle between Filiki Eteria and the Ottoman Army occurred in the city, resulting in an Ottoman victory. The Ottomans destroyed the city almost completely and massacred its population, as reprisals.

==== Growth ====
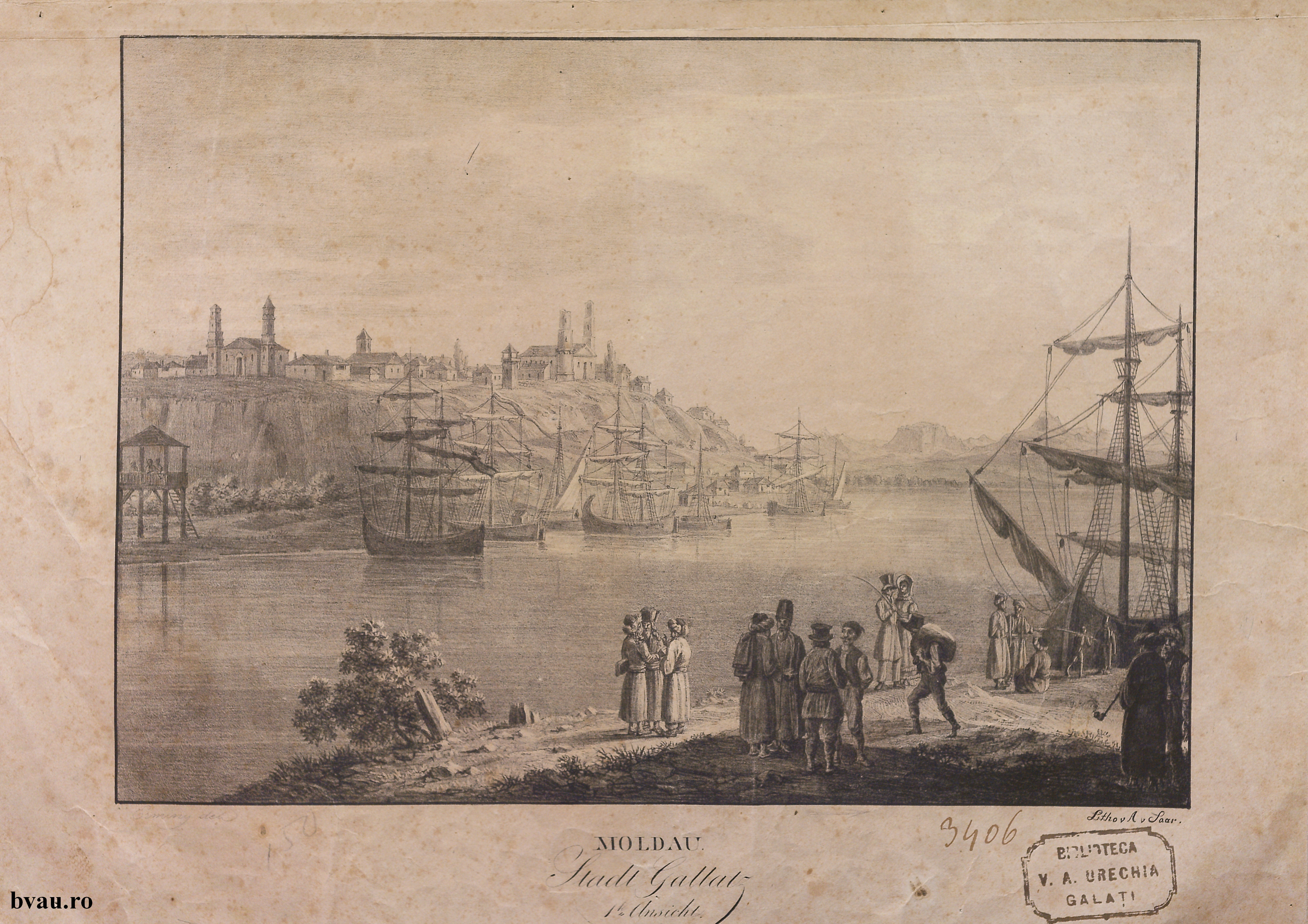
Galați in 1826

Despite the wars and unrest, Galați developed based on trade (especially grain exports). In 1805, France and England established vice-consulates. In 1832, the School of the Holy Archangels Michael and Gabriel is founded. Two years later, in 1834, Austrian ships were having scheduled arrivals and in 1837, Galați was declared a free port (this was revoked in 1882). In 1850, James Buchanan, the U.S. president, sent a vice-consul to Galați and the U.S. opened a consulate in 1858. Galați was also a trading port for German lands. When the Crimean War (1854–1856) ended, Galați became a seat of the Danube European Commission. In 1869, the Mihai Eminescu municipal park opened and by 1870, factories were opening. By, 1908 they numbered 41. On 13 September 1872, the King Charles I railway station and northern city rail tunnel opened. The River station opened shortly after on 24 September 1880. In 1889, the V. A. Urechia library opened.

After the union of the Romanian principalities in 1859, with Alexandru Ioan Cuza as leader, development in Galați increased. Zeletin wrote,

"The birth of the modern Romanian state must distinguish two main currents – one exuberant but superficial, based on liberal ideas which depart from Paris to Bucharest and Iași. The other is quieter but deep, leaving from London to Galați and Brăila: English is the current capitalist economy." (Romanian Bourgeoisie, Zeletin, Stephen.)

=== 1900–1947 ===
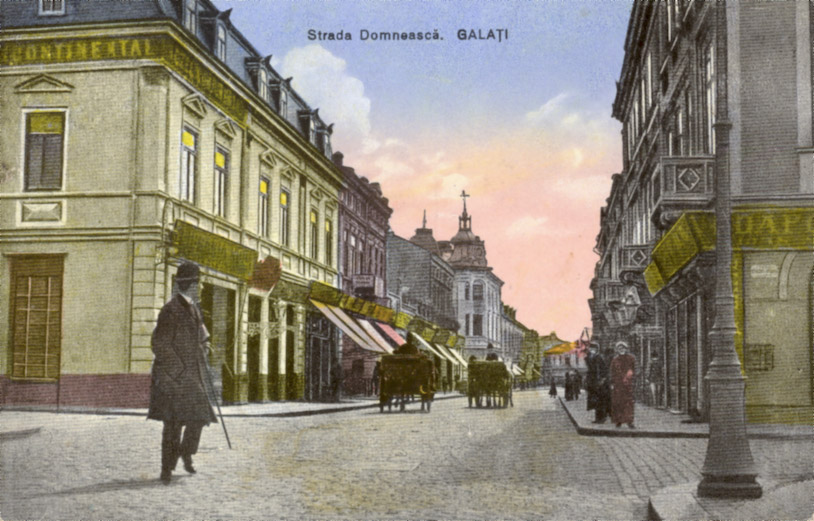
Domnească Street, 1905

Between 1900 and the beginning of World War I, Galați continued its trade in grain and timber with sixteen consulates. Galați was part of Covurlui County.

In 1907, social unrest among the peasant classes precipitated intervention by the Romanian army. In 1911, a statue of the poet Mihai Eminescu was erected.

==== World War I ====
Galați remained under Romanian control during World War I. Romanian soldiers fought alongside those of Russia against the army of the Central Powers. Galați was bombed by retreating Russian troops in January 1918.

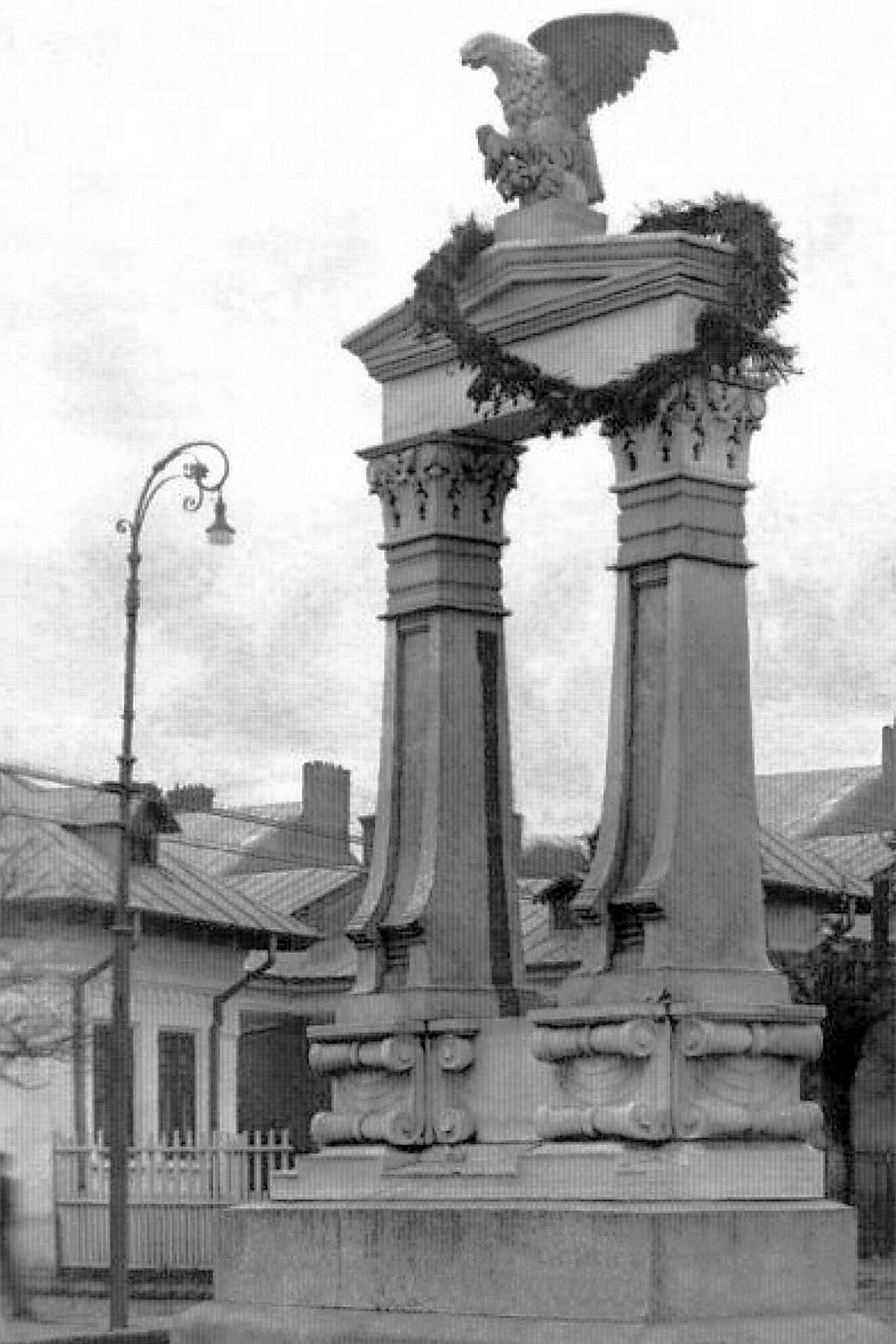
Battle of Galați Monument in 1921

==== Interwar period ====
In 1919, a high school for Jewish students opened. A first air race between Galați and Bucharest was held in 1926 following the end of the construction of the Galați Airport. The 1930 Romanian census recorded 100,000 residents in Galați. After Bucharest, Chișinău, Iași and Cernăuți, Galați was Romania's fifth city. In 1938, the Ținutul Dunării de Jos (Lower Danube Land) was established.

==== World War II ====
On 30 June 1940, during the Romanian withdrawal from Bessarabia and Northern Bukovina following the Soviet occupation of Bessarabia and Northern Bukovina, Romanian soldiers opened fire on civilians gathered near the railway station in the 1940 Galați massacre. The International Commission on the Holocaust in Romania estimated that roughly 300 people were killed, most of them Jews.

During World War II, Galați was bombed by the Soviet Air Forces and Luftwaffe. The Anglo-Americans destroyed, by the air raid of 6 June 1944, part of the military airport, the church of Sf. Vineri and the houses located in the direction of aircraft flight. The railway station, inaugurated on 13 September 1872, was destroyed as were many other historic buildings and most of the old town. On 27 August 1944, Galați was captured by Soviet troops of the 3rd Ukrainian Front in the course of the Jassy–Kishinev Offensive.

==== Jewish community ====
Before World War II Galați hosted 22 synagogues and in 1926, it was the base for the Zionist Revisionist Organization of Romania. On 30 June 1940, several hundred civilians, most of them Jews, were killed by Romanian soldiers in the 1940 Galați massacre. Although Galați's Jewish community suffered further persecution by Romanian authorities during World War II, the community was not destroyed in the Holocaust. Since the 1940s the community has gradually diminished through emigration.

=== Communist period (1947–1989) ===
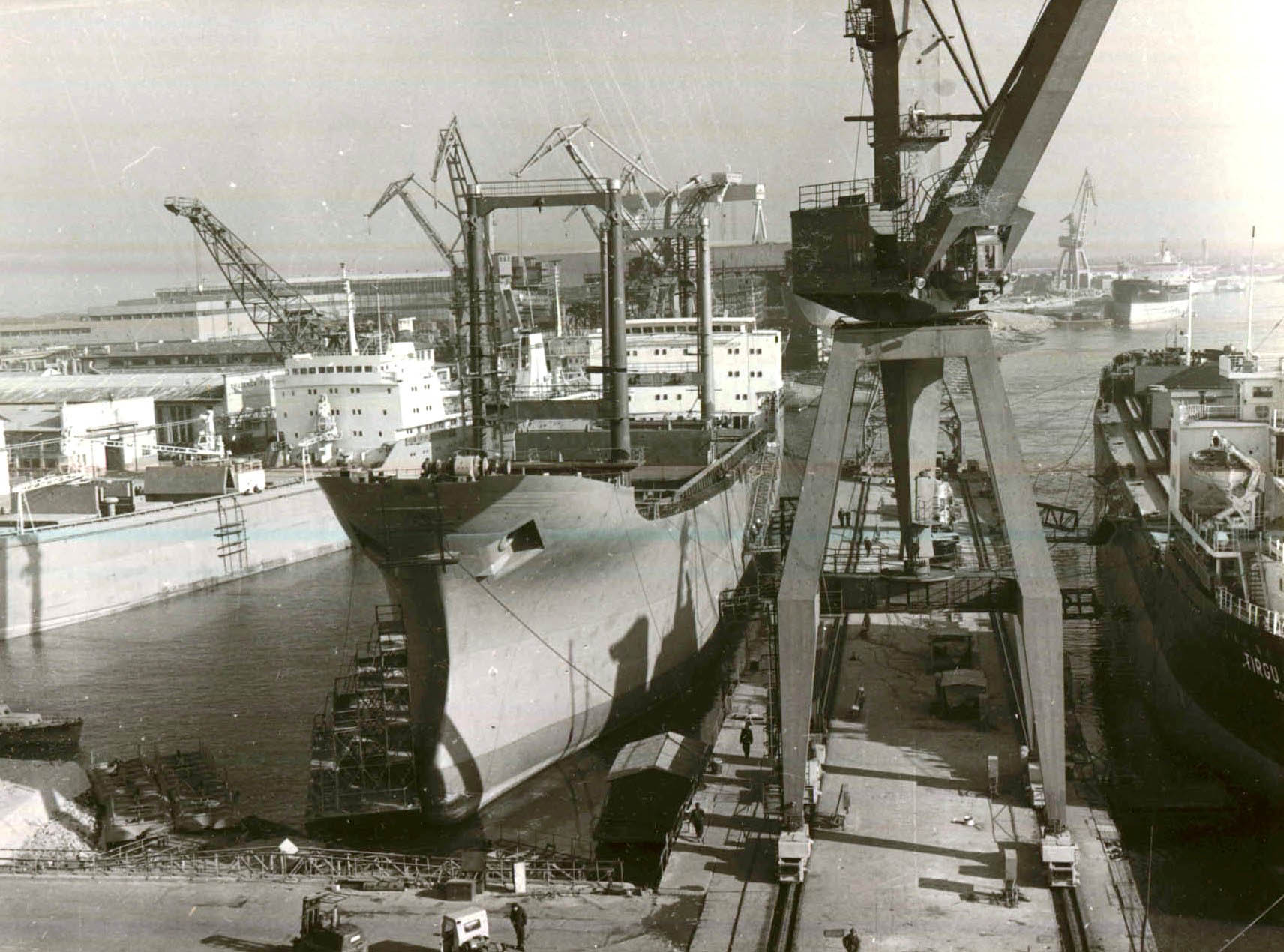
Galaţi shipyard in 1978

After World War II, Galați was rebuilt along communist lines. The town's population was about 80,000. In 1956, a proposal to join Brăila and Galați was made and the building of a speed tram pier was proposed with a Swiss company. The plans never materialized. In 1958, the Galați Airport was abolished. Construction of the Galați steel works began in 1960 and the plant opened in 1966. The population at this time was 151,000. In 1971, the Făurei – Galați railway capacity was increased, and, in 1982, it was electrified.

On 11 September 1989, a Bulgarian ship collided with a cruise ship near Galați. 151 passengers and crew died (all but sixteen).

=== Contemporary period ===
In 2004, Romania's first information technology park opened in Galați.

On 14 July 2005, Galați was affected by widespread flooding. The Siret river reached record levels and across Romania, the death toll reached 21. In 2010, broken flood barriers caused flooding of the Valley City area of Galați.

On 29 May 2026, a block of flats in Galați was hit by a Russian Geran-2 drone, injuring two people and causing a fire. About 70 people were evacuated.

== Geography ==
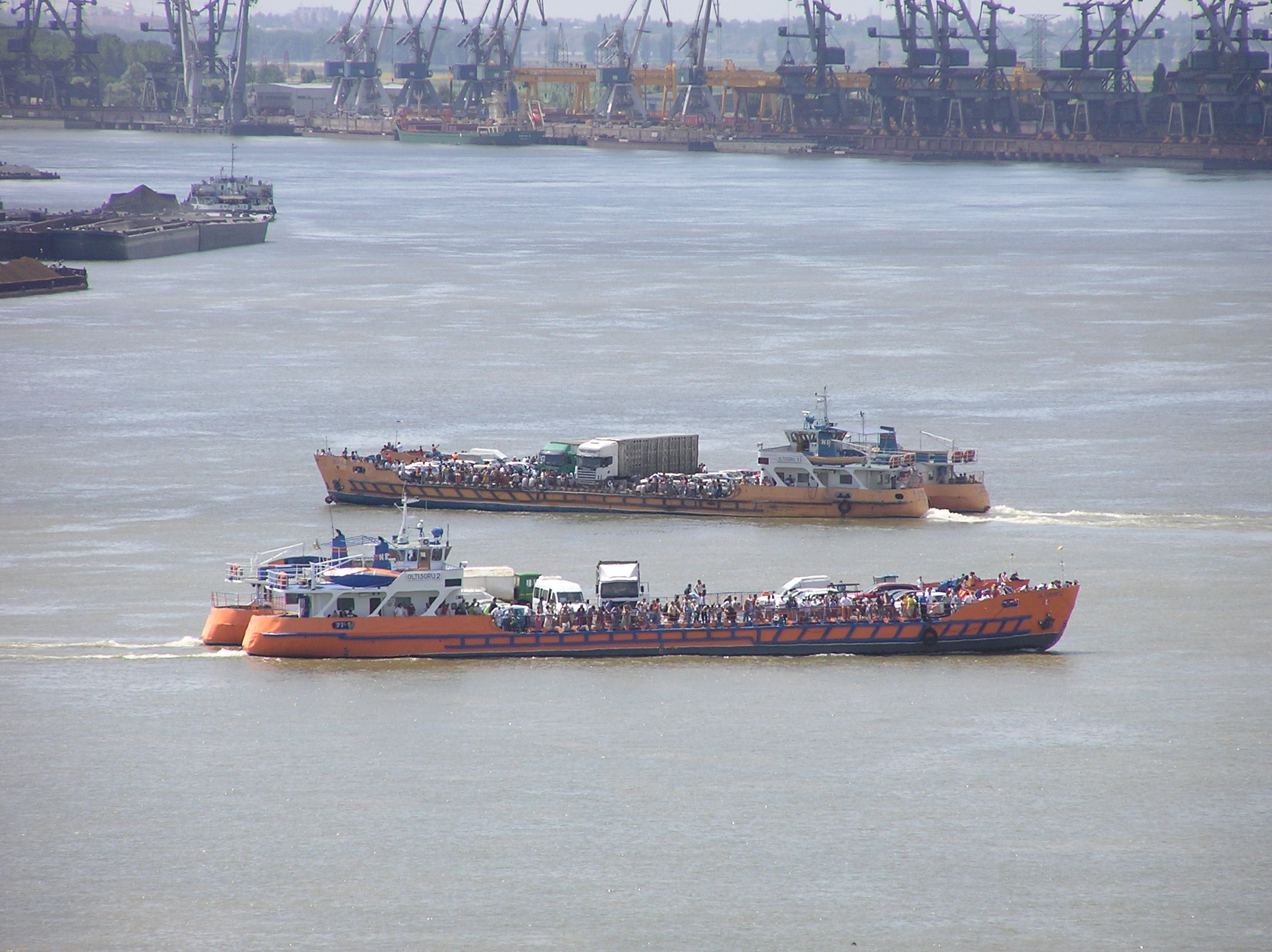
Over the Danube

=== Topography ===
Galați is located in southeastern Romania. Its coordinates are latitude 45 ° 27 'north and longitude 28 ° 02' east. Its area is 246.4 square kilometers (95.1 sq mi). Galați lies in the southern part of the Moldavian Plateau on the left (west) bank of the Danube at the junction of the river Siret (west) and the Prut River (east), near Lake Brates. It is 80 kilometers (50 mi) from the Black Sea. The nearest town is Brăila, 15 kilometers (9.3 mi) to the south. Galați is built on three geological terraces. One lies beneath "Valley City", with elevations between 5 and 7 metres (16 and 23 ft). The other two, which make a fan shape, have elevations of 20–25 meters (66–82 ft) (the site of the old town, now the city centre) and 40 meters (130 ft) (the site of the modern city) respectively. The Danube is considered the "life-blood" of Galați. The Danube is the second longest river in Europe 2,850 km [ 1,770 mi ]), with an average flow of 6,199 cubic meters (218,900 cu ft) per second in the Galați section. After the Siret River, the largest tributary in Romania, joins the Danube, the flow is 210 cubic meters per second (7,400 cu ft/s). After the Prut River joins the Danube, the flow becomes 86 cubic meters per second (3,000 cu ft/s). The Danube flows have significant seasonal variation. The maximum flows occur in May; 18,000–19,000 m^{3}/s or 640,000–670,000 cu ft/s. The minimum flows occur during the summer; 2,000–2,450 m^{3}/s or 71,000–87,000 cu ft/s.

=== Climate ===
Under the Köppen climate classification, Galați falls within either a hot-summer humid continental climate (Dfa) if the 0 °C (32 °F) isotherm is used or a humid subtropical climate (Cfa) if the −3 °C (27 °F) isotherm is used. Galați experiences four distinct seasons.

Climate data for Galați, Romania (1991–2020 normals, extremes 1901-present)
Month	Jan	Feb	Mar	Apr	May	Jun	Jul	Aug	Sep	Oct	Nov	Dec	Year
Record high °C (°F)	19.4 (66.9)	22.4 (72.3)	27.8 (82.0)	31.8 (89.2)	36.2 (97.2)	38.5 (101.3)	40.5 (104.9)	40.4 (104.7)	36.7 (98.1)	33.5 (92.3)	25.6 (78.1)	20.0 (68.0)	40.5 (104.9)
Mean maximum °C (°F)	10.5 (50.9)	15.1 (59.2)	21.7 (71.1)	25.5 (77.9)	30.9 (87.6)	34.0 (93.2)	35.8 (96.4)	35.9 (96.6)	31.4 (88.5)	26.1 (79.0)	20.4 (68.7)	12.3 (54.1)	36.8 (98.2)
Mean daily maximum °C (°F)	2.3 (36.1)	5.2 (41.4)	11.1 (52.0)	17.7 (63.9)	23.8 (74.8)	27.8 (82.0)	30.1 (86.2)	30.0 (86.0)	24.3 (75.7)	17.2 (63.0)	10.0 (50.0)	3.8 (38.8)	16.9 (62.5)
Daily mean °C (°F)	−1.1 (30.0)	0.9 (33.6)	5.7 (42.3)	11.7 (53.1)	17.6 (63.7)	21.7 (71.1)	23.9 (75.0)	23.4 (74.1)	17.9 (64.2)	11.9 (53.4)	6.0 (42.8)	0.6 (33.1)	11.7 (53.0)
Mean daily minimum °C (°F)	−3.8 (25.2)	−2.3 (27.9)	1.6 (34.9)	6.9 (44.4)	12.2 (54.0)	16.3 (61.3)	18.1 (64.6)	17.7 (63.9)	13.0 (55.4)	7.9 (46.2)	3.0 (37.4)	−2.0 (28.4)	7.4 (45.3)
Mean minimum °C (°F)	−13.5 (7.7)	−11.6 (11.1)	−5.1 (22.8)	0.8 (33.4)	6.0 (42.8)	10.7 (51.3)	13.1 (55.6)	11.8 (53.2)	6.7 (44.1)	−0.1 (31.8)	−4.7 (23.5)	−10.7 (12.7)	−15.7 (3.7)
Record low °C (°F)	−26.5 (−15.7)	−28.6 (−19.5)	−17.2 (1.0)	−5.2 (22.6)	−0.1 (31.8)	3.8 (38.8)	7.2 (45.0)	2.4 (36.3)	−5.7 (21.7)	−15.6 (3.9)	−21.5 (−6.7)	−21.5 (−6.7)	−28.6 (−19.5)
Average precipitation mm (inches)	33.6 (1.32)	25.9 (1.02)	33.0 (1.30)	40.1 (1.58)	49.6 (1.95)	62.2 (2.45)	55.2 (2.17)	34.0 (1.34)	44.9 (1.77)	51.3 (2.02)	37.7 (1.48)	41.3 (1.63)	508.8 (20.03)
Average precipitation days (≥ 1.0 mm)	4.9	5.3	5.0	6.2	7.4	7.1	5.5	4.2	4.7	4.0	4.7	5.6	64.6
Average relative humidity (%)	87	85	81	75	73	73	72	72	74	79	87	89	79
Mean monthly sunshine hours	81	113	161	203	255	274	299	282	219	156	86	73	2,202
Source 1: NOAA
Source 2: Romanian National Statistic Institute (extremes 1901–2000), Deutscher Wetterdienst (humidity 1973–1992) Meteomanz (extremes since 2021)

Climate data for Galați (1961–1990 normals)
Month	Jan	Feb	Mar	Apr	May	Jun	Jul	Aug	Sep	Oct	Nov	Dec	Year
Mean daily maximum °C (°F)	1.1 (34.0)	3.0 (37.4)	8.9 (48.0)	16.6 (61.9)	22.3 (72.1)	25.9 (78.6)	27.9 (82.2)	27.5 (81.5)	23.5 (74.3)	16.9 (62.4)	9.4 (48.9)	3.4 (38.1)	15.5 (60.0)
Daily mean °C (°F)	−2.5 (27.5)	−0.6 (30.9)	4.0 (39.2)	10.8 (51.4)	16.6 (61.9)	20.2 (68.4)	22.0 (71.6)	21.4 (70.5)	17.2 (63.0)	11.1 (52.0)	5.3 (41.5)	0.2 (32.4)	10.5 (50.9)
Mean daily minimum °C (°F)	−5.3 (22.5)	−3.5 (25.7)	0.2 (32.4)	6.0 (42.8)	11.2 (52.2)	14.6 (58.3)	16.2 (61.2)	15.8 (60.4)	12.0 (53.6)	6.6 (43.9)	2.1 (35.8)	−2.4 (27.7)	6.1 (43.0)
Average precipitation mm (inches)	29.0 (1.14)	32.0 (1.26)	27.0 (1.06)	38.0 (1.50)	51.0 (2.01)	68.0 (2.68)	46.0 (1.81)	46.0 (1.81)	42.0 (1.65)	27.0 (1.06)	36.0 (1.42)	35.0 (1.38)	477 (18.78)
Average snowfall cm (inches)	9.0 (3.5)	7.9 (3.1)	6.4 (2.5)	0.0 (0.0)	0.0 (0.0)	0.0 (0.0)	0.0 (0.0)	0.0 (0.0)	0.0 (0.0)	0.0 (0.0)	10.4 (4.1)	7.0 (2.8)	40.7 (16)
Average precipitation days (≥ 1.0 mm)	5	6	5	6	7	8	6	5	4	4	5	5	66
Average dew point °C (°F)	−4.3 (24.3)	−3.2 (26.2)	0.5 (32.9)	5.4 (41.7)	10.5 (50.9)	14.1 (57.4)	15.2 (59.4)	14.6 (58.3)	11.7 (53.1)	6.9 (44.4)	2.6 (36.7)	−1.1 (30.0)	6.1 (42.9)
Mean monthly sunshine hours	77	87.2	142	193.7	255	286.9	306.3	296.9	233.7	187.1	86	64.7	2,216.5
Source: NOAA NCEI

Summers are very warm with temperatures sometimes exceeding 35 °C (95 °F) while winters are cold and dry with temperatures at night sometimes dropping below −10 °C (14 °F). Average monthly precipitation ranges from about 28 to 68.6 mm (1.1 to 2.7 in) in June.

=== Military importance ===
Galați is part of the strategic Focșani Gate. The city was also part of the important defensive Focșani–Nămoloasa–Galați line built in the 19th century.

== Cityscape ==
=== Urban planning ===
In 2005, Galați ranked in the top two cities in Romania for green space per capita. Urban planning and maintenance activities are governed by the "Public Administration Public Domain Galați" (SPADP) Ecosal Prest, SC RER Ecological Service SRL, SC Citadine 98 SA.

=== Places of interest ===
==== Roman camp at Tirighina-Barbosi ====
From 1959 to 1962, archeological excavations were carried out at the Roman castellum in Barbosi. The site lies north of the Danube, near the mouth of the Siret. A comparison can be made to the fortress at Dinogetia. The archeologists found clear stratigraphy in the excavation. They located the Tirighina Dacian fortress, reinforced by an earthen bank. Finds included Dacian pottery from an import business. Also found was a silver coin dating the Dacian fortress to the first century BCE. A burning layer suggested damage to the fortress by fire. Also found were coins dating from the rule of Augustus(63 BCE – 14 AD) through to Nero (37AD – 68AD).

==== Lambrinidi House ====
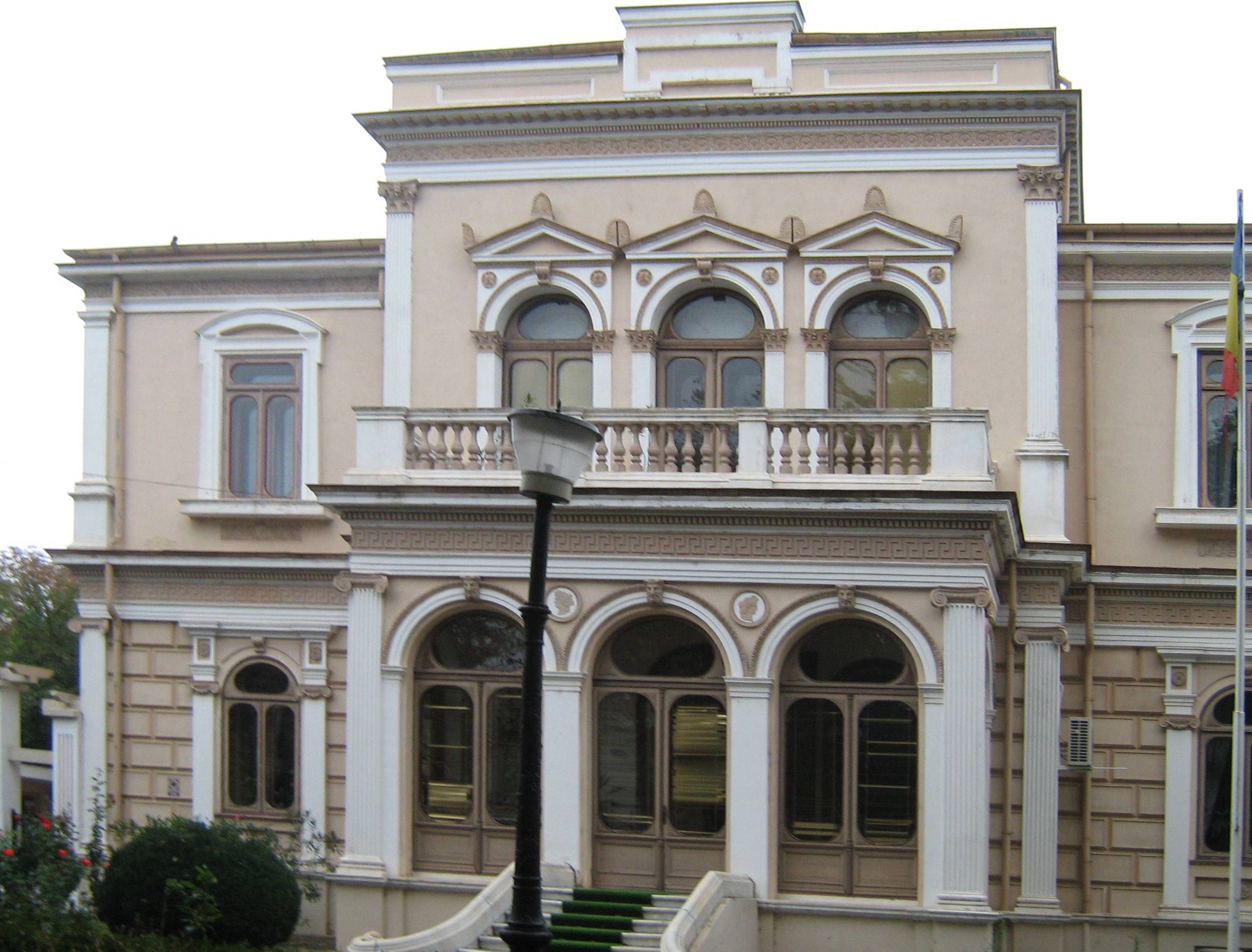
Lambrinidi House

Navigation Palace

The Lambrinidi House is located near the university, at 51 Royal Street. It was built by Lambrinidi Epaminonda, a Greek mill owner. He owned a machine shop to repair ships. The Prince Charles stayed at the house on a visit to Galați, in April 1879. It has served as the seat of the Court of Appeals; the Mihail Kogalniceanu High School and, after the earthquake of 9 November 1940, the city hall.

==== Robescu House ====
The Robescu House was built about 1896. The architect was Ion Mincu. A Romanian tourist website describes the building: :"Robescu House has an elevated basement, two levels with two turret-balcony on the first floor and another balcony at the ground floor, to the street. The exterior decorations are made in Brancoveanu style, glossy ceramic plates. The glossy ceramic is used to decorate the floral upper register. Today it serves as the "Children's Palace".

==== Palace of Navigation (River Station) ====
The Galați Palace of Navigation was designed by Petre Antonescu. It dates to the late 19th century. It is the office of "Maritime Danube Ports Administration" and Navrom, which controls Romania's navigable waterways.

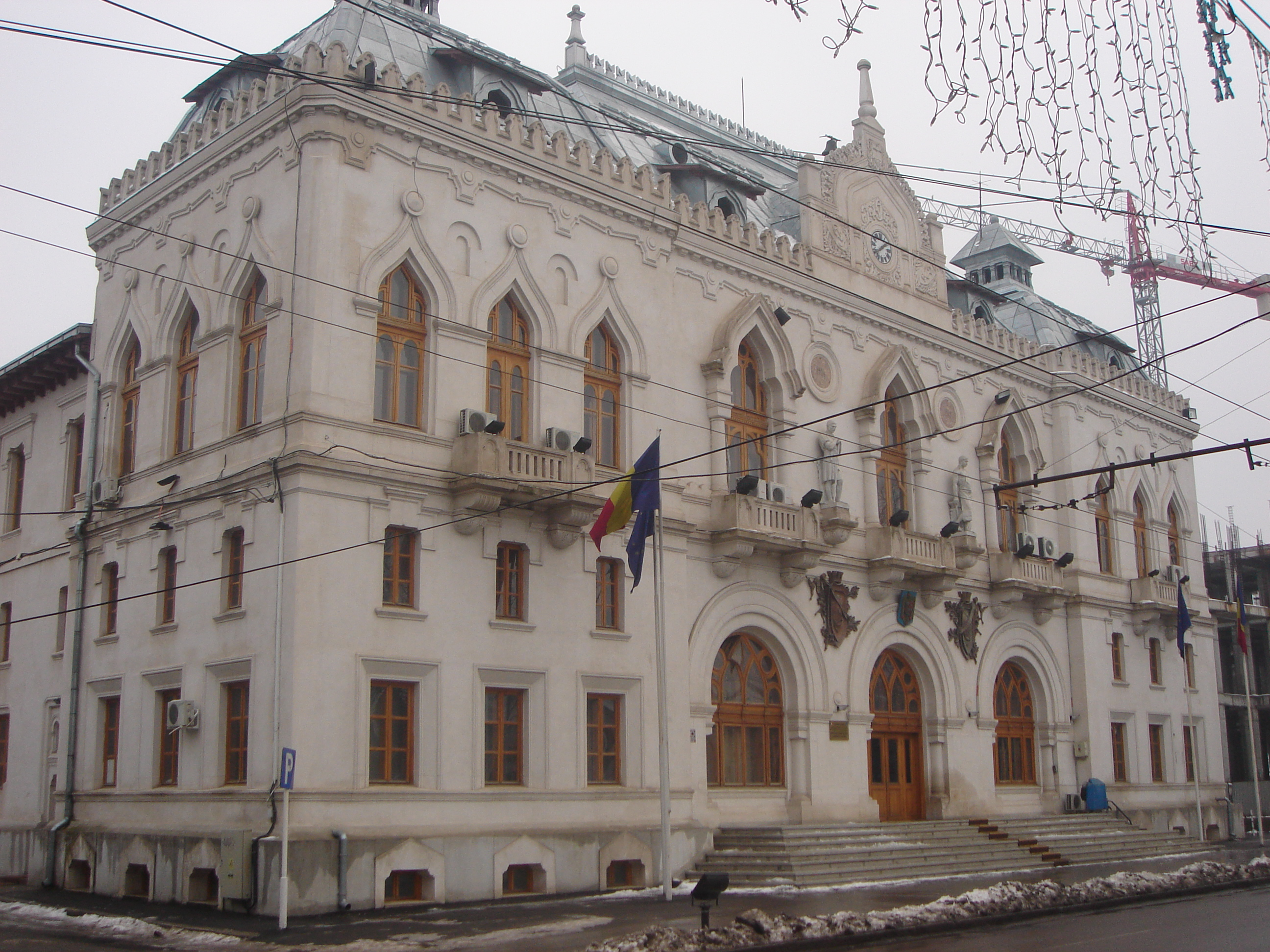
Administrative Palace

==== University Palace ====
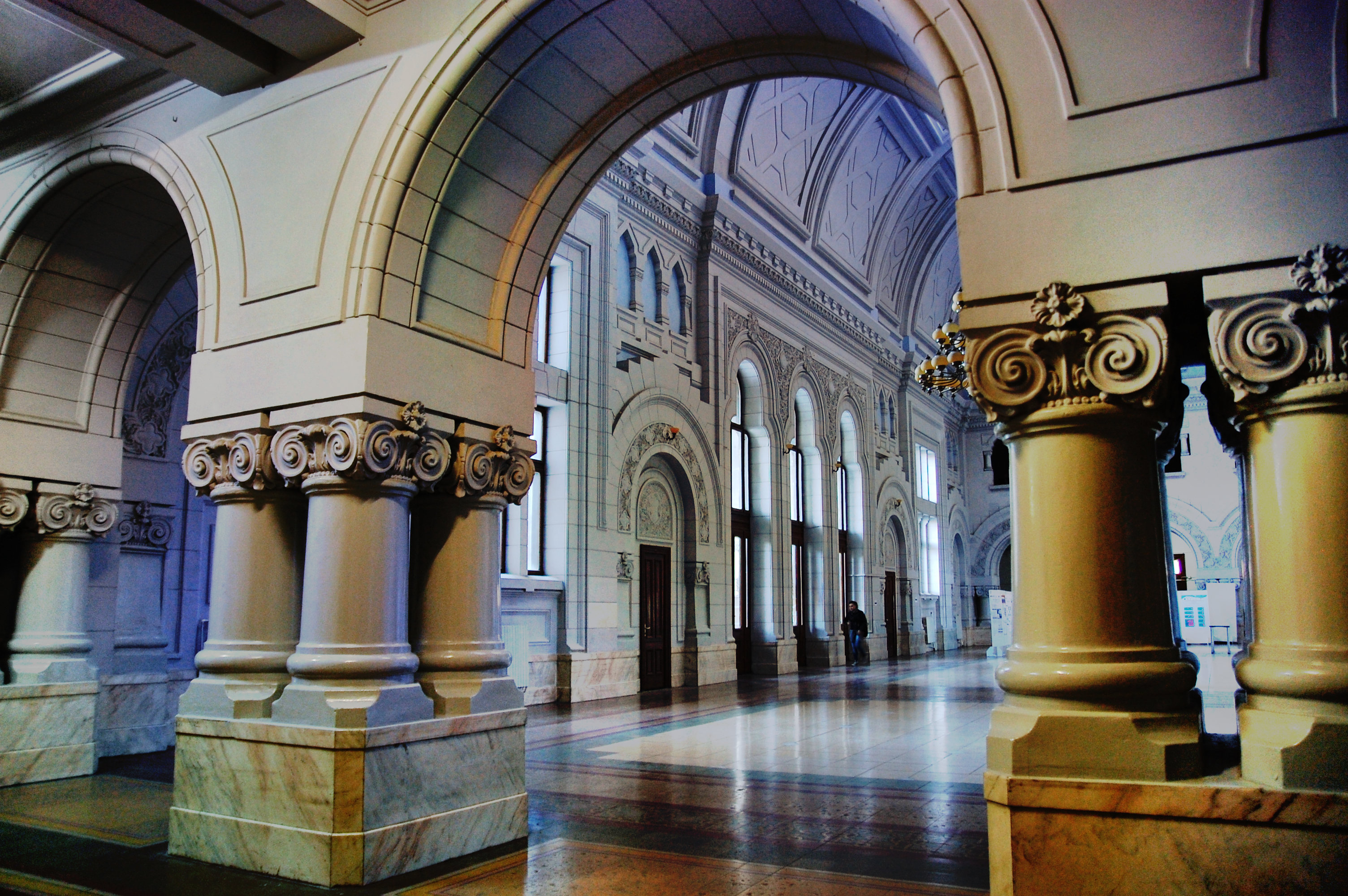
The entrance of the University of Galați

The former "Palace of Justice" is a prominent architectural monument in the Galați old town. It was built between 1911 and 1913. Now, it is the University of Galați headquarters.

==== Lupa Capitolina ====
Meaning "Capitoline Wolf", this statue was erected in 1995 and reflects Roman influence in Galați.

==== Administrative Palace ====
This building was erected in 1904 and 1905 and opened on 27 April 1906. Like Robescu House, it was designed by Ion Mincu. Frederick Storck contributed white marble sculptures of "industry" and "agriculture" at the top of the main façade. Other features are two bronze flags and a large clock which plays the waltz, "Danube Waves" by Joseph Ivanovich (1845–1902).

=== Places of worship ===
St. Andrew and St. Nicholas Orthodox Cathedral of the archbishop of the Lower Danube

==== Archdiocesan Cathedral of the Lower Danube ====
The cornerstone of the Galați Cathedral was placed on 27 April 1906, by the Crown Prince Ferdinand and Princess Marie. Also present was the Bishop of the Lower Danube, Pimen Georgescu. Construction continued from 1906 to 1917. The architects were Petre Antonescu and Ștefan Burcuș. The church has one dome and no side isles. From 1989, restoration work has been underway at the church. This includes cleaning of the 1957 paint work, paving around the cathedral and the construction of the St John Cassian centre, a building for cultural, pastoral and missionary work. At the church's centennial in 2006, the relics of St. Nectarios of Aegina were brought to Galați.

==== Fortified Monastery of the Holy Virgin ====
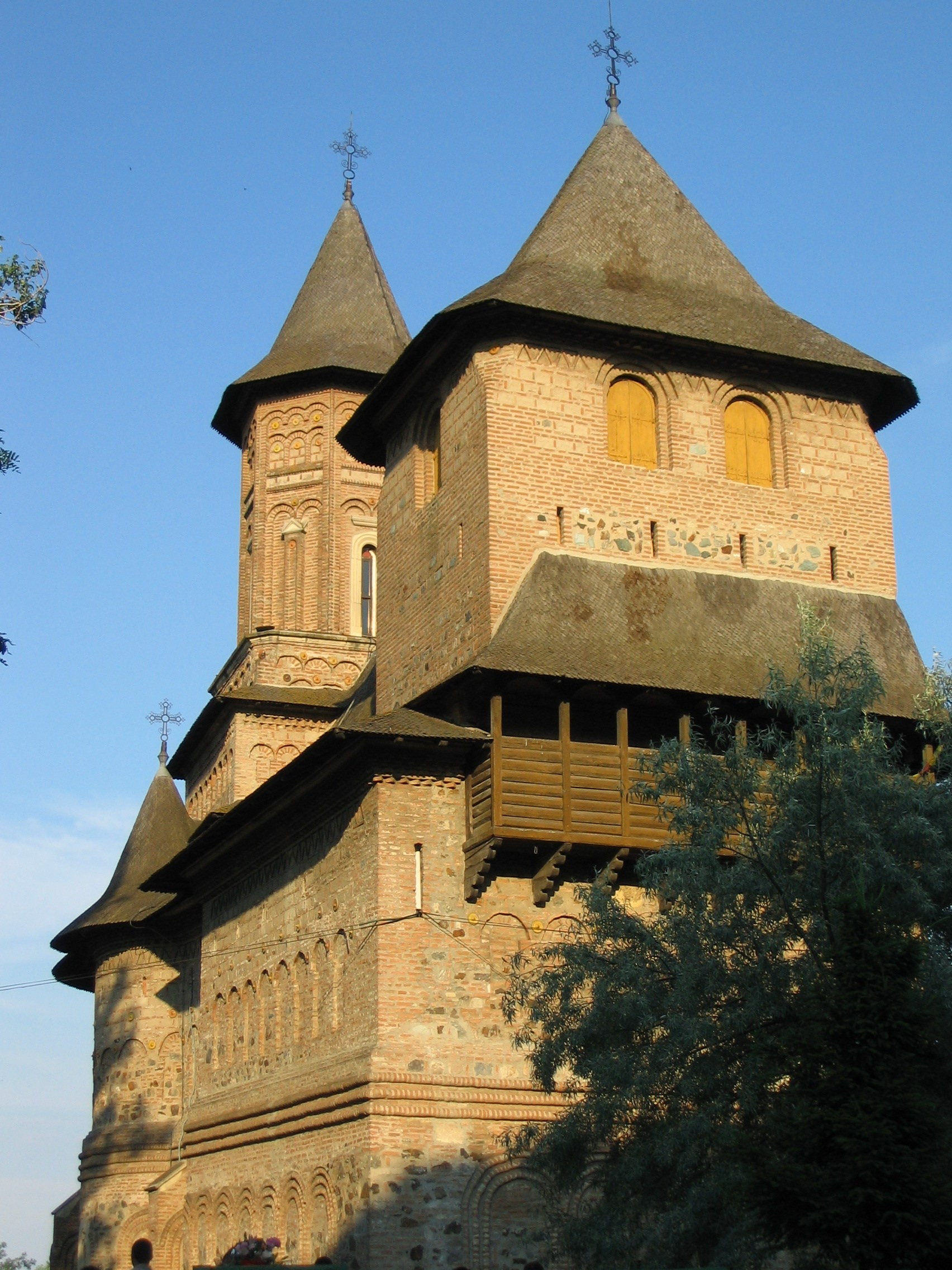
Precista fortified church

This is the oldest building in Galați. It was consecrated as a place of worship in September 1647 during the reign of Vasile Lupu. The church was dedicated to the Vatopedi Monastery on Mount Athos. It was built from local materials including stone, forest wood, brick and lime, sand from the beaches of the Danube and so on. As well as its typical Romanian church architecture, the monastery has some specific elements of interest such as a bell tower with battlements for observation of the Danube valley and for defense. The tower has two levels and a room to hide assets. There are two ramparts and a door to a balcony. The second floor is fitted with windows and battlements. Another of the church's defences is a reinforced bridge consisting of two parts, one above the nave and one above the altar. The bridge has 28 battlements. The church survived the turbulent periods of Galați's history and was rebuilt and restored in 1829 and again in 1859. From 1953 to 1957, the church was used as a museum. It was restored in the period 1991–1994. There may be a tunnel from the church beneath the Danube.

==== Bulgarian Church ====
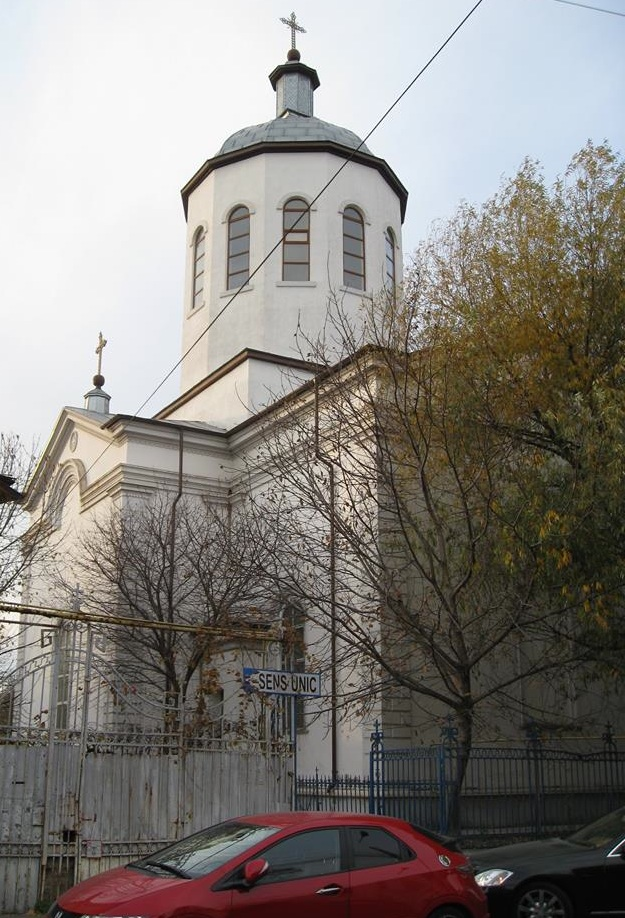
Bulgarian Church

Construction of the Bulgarian Orthodox Church of Saint Pantaleon began in 1861 under the guidance of Bulgarian National Revival figure Archimandrite Maxim Raykovich (1801–1874) of Dryanovo. However, the lack of funds prolonged the construction works and the church was only consecrated in 1887. The Bulgarian Church of Saint Pantaleon features a Neo-Byzantine design with Slavic influences.

Along with the church, Raykovich also founded a Bulgarian school which occupied an adjacent house. The same house would become a hub for Bulgarian revolutionaries persecuted by the Ottoman authorities. In 1871–72, Bulgaria's national poet Hristo Botev lived in the house during a part of his exile, as a commemorative plaque still reminds.

Raykovich died in Galați in 1874 and was buried in the courtyard of the Bulgarian Church, where his tombstone still stands.

==== Greek Church ====
The cornerstone of the Greek Church was laid on 6 August 1866. The church was dedicated to the "Transfiguration" on 17 September 1872, by the Bishop Melchizedek and the Archimandrite Eughenie Xiropotamo. In the nave is a marble plaque with the names of the founders and two marble plates with the names of the founders and major benefactors. The church is a cruciform tower with two bell towers on the west side. Papadopoulos of Adrianople was the artist. There are large icons representing the holy virgin Mary with child, the resurrection, St. Gerasimos, St. Sophia, St. Gregory and St. Basil the great. There are eight stained glass church windows containing the holy apostles Peter, Andrew, Mark, Thomas, Bartholomew and Luke on the northern side and Paul Simon, John, James, Philip, on the southern side.

==== St. Paraskeva Cathedral ====
This church is located together with the Cătușa cemetery in the southern part of Galați. Its general construction was completed but the interior layout is not. The basement of the cathedral is a very small space, which will serve as a mortuary chapel. The official opening of the interior was planned for 2012.

==== Church Mavromol ====
Mavromol is a former monastery. Its name means "black rock" in Greek. It was built in 1669 and dedicated to the Assumption by George Ducas (died 1685) and his son. There was rebuilding between 1700 and 1703. During the revolution of 1821 the church was burned by the Turks. The current building dates from 1858 to 1861 and respects the original plan. Interior murals and other valuable elements were restored between 1973 and 1975. The monks of the church taught at Galați's first school in 1765. They taught in Greek. (In 1803, teaching was conducted in Romanian under the orders of Constantin Moruz). During the Russo-Turkish War (1768–1774), and the Russo-Austrian-Turkish War (1787–1792), Mavromol church was damaged and teaching ceased until 1803. The church is constructed in the style of a basilica with apses beyond the main walls. The church has a carved wooden icon of the "Virgin Mary" from the church of St. Sava Monastery in Bucharest. The ceiling is composed of three parts separated by double arches. The entrance is on the south side through a door marked by an icon and heraldic symbols: a bull's head and two lions. Also on the south side is the coat of arms of Moldova, carved in a stone medallion. During communist rule, the church, as a sacred place, was improperly appropriated.

==== The Church of St. Spyridon ====
Built in 1817, this church has four buttresses, three towers and a dome supported by crossed arches. Although its murals are not maintained, it contains valuable icons.

==== Synagogue of Galați ====
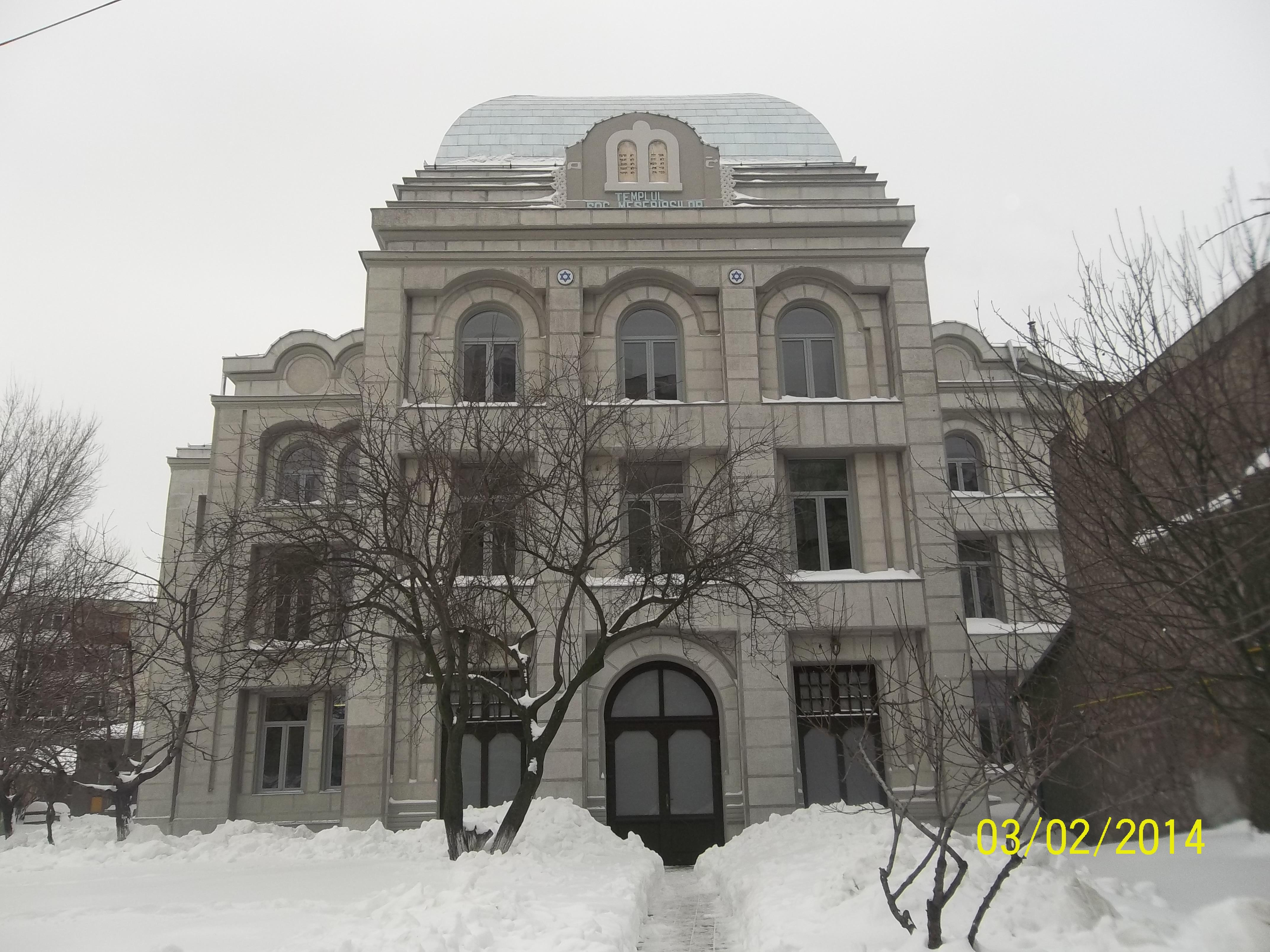
The façade of the synagogue in winter 2014

There is only one remaining synagogue in Galați (near the Museum of History on Domnească street).

==== Masonic Temple ====
The temple was built in 1896 on the site of a synagogue dating from 1806.

==== Schitul Vovidenia ====
This church was built in 1790. It is the site of the burial tomb of Smaranda Cuza, the mother of Alexandru Ioan Cuza. The original church was burned in the unrest of 1821 then renovated in 1851. Above the nave, a dome is supported by arches crossed in the traditional Moldovan style. There is a bell tower above the main dome, a smaller one above the altar and another above the porch added in 1901.

==== Roman Catholic Church ====
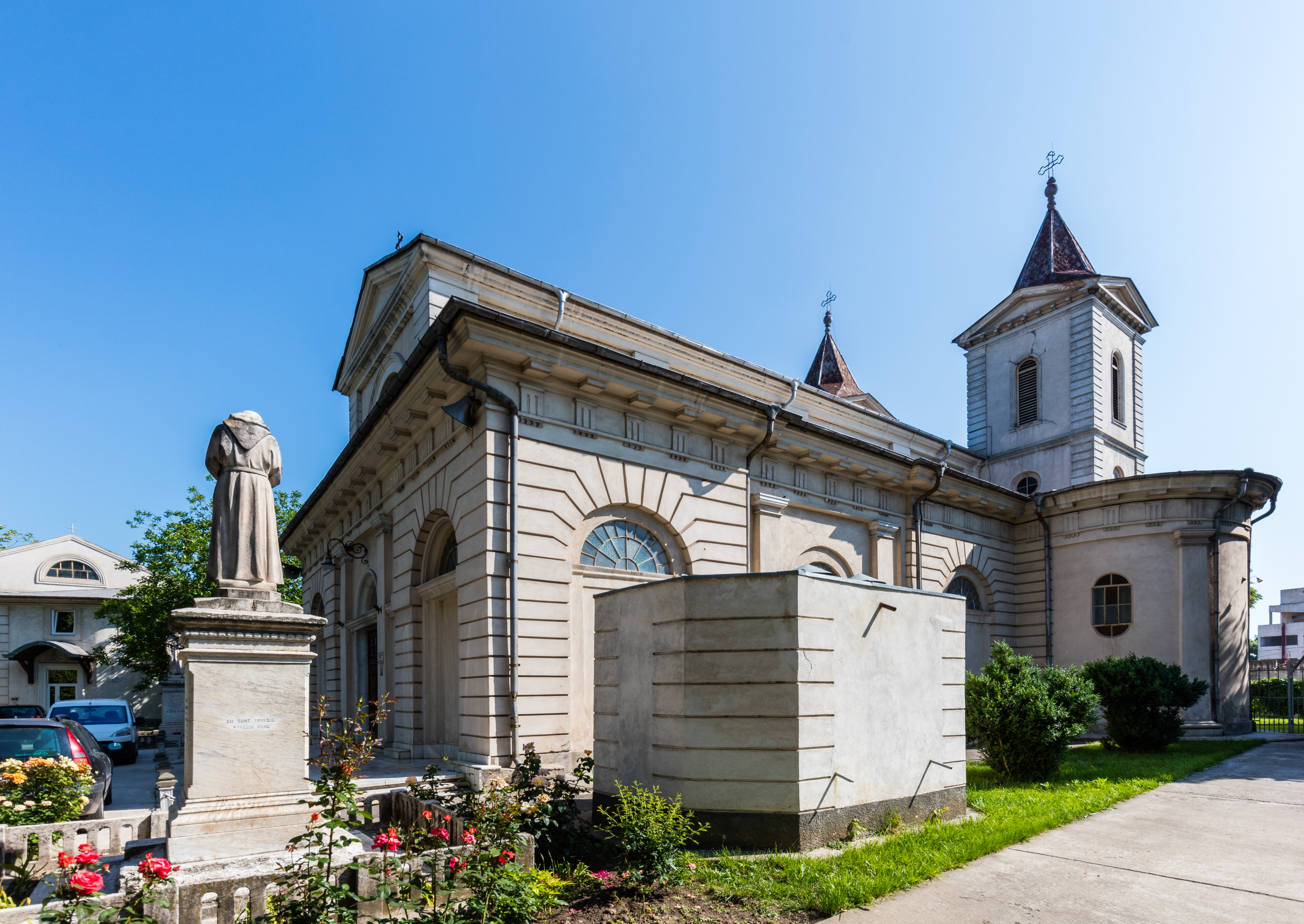
Roman Catholic church

Galați's Roman Catholic church was built in 1844 and expanded in 1873. It contains objects of artistic as well as sacred value including a high altar made of marble; a painting of "St. John the Baptist preaching"; a "Most Holy Heart" statue of Jesus Christ; Pietà statues and a statue of Saint Francis of Assisi. The church was strengthened and renovated to its current state between 1985 and 1988.

=== Gardens, parks and recreation areas ===
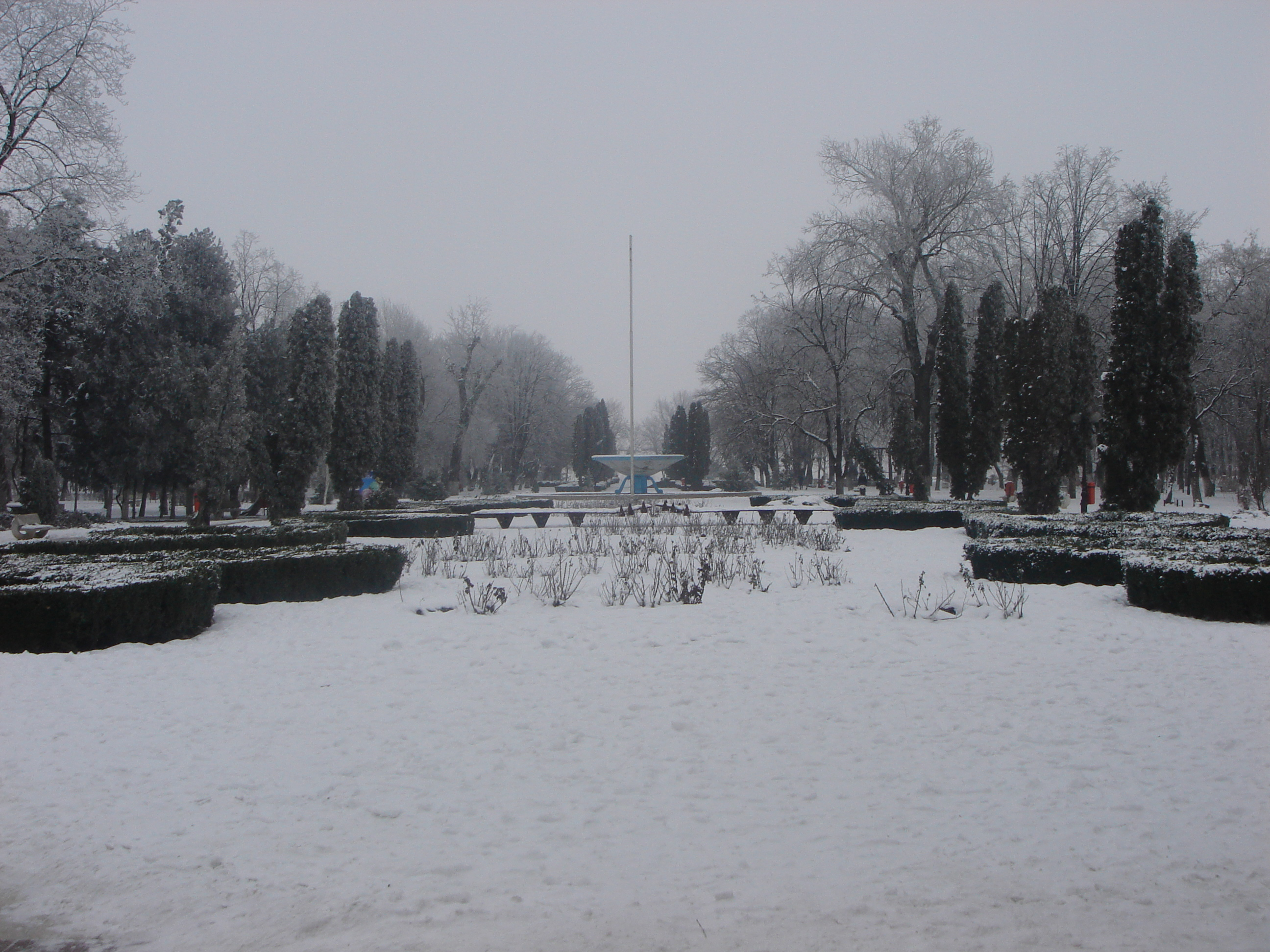
Public Garden

==== Mihai Eminescu Municipal Park ====
This park was designed in 1869 in honour of Mihai Eminescu, who visited the area, particularly in his later life. some of the trees are from the time of Eminescu. There is a small lake and a place for recitals once used, for example, by military bands. People visit the park to see a statue of Eminescu.

==== Galați Public Gardens ====
This park is located near the student complex. It looks over Lake Brates, the railway station and train depot.

==== C.F.R. (Romanian State Railways) Park ====
The railway park is located north of the railway, near the railway tunnel, the terminus of the local public transport lines (102 and 104) and a nursing home.

==== Botanical Garden ====
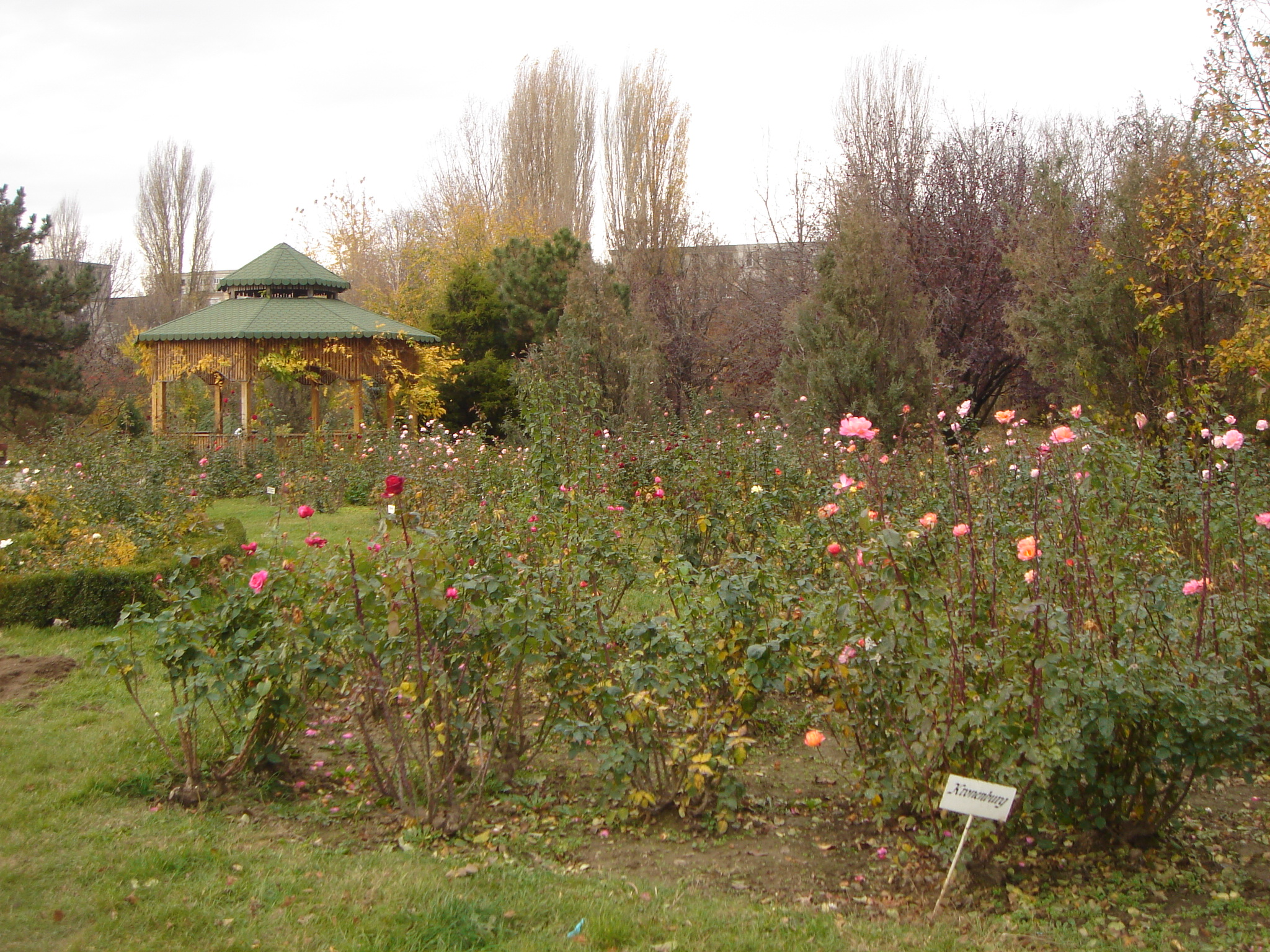
Botanical Garden

The Botanical Garden dominates the left bank of the Danube at Galați. Its southern slope is the site of the Museum of Natural History in Galați. The museum has collections of tropical and subtropical plants (cactuses, euphorbias, palms, crotons, geraniums, begonias, etc.) rosary chic, over 200 varieties of roses, flora and vegetation. There are over 3000 specimens of tree species and shrubs, an oak area with more than 50 examples of birch and conifers, and a replica Japanese garden.

==== Garboavele Zoo and Reserve ====
Both are located at the northern exit of town. Garboavele Forest Zoo is included in the Natural Sciences Museum Complex. The zoo keeps various exotic species. Riding enthusiasts can practice their sport at the zoo. The zoo theme was developed together with experts from European Association of Zoos and Aquaria, and aims to preserve rare animals and provide conservation education.

=== Hunters Lake ===
Hunters Lake is located in Galați's far north-east. It covers 28 hectares of land including an 11 hectare natural lake; a 10 hectare forest of acacia; and 10 hectares of developed parkland for recreation.

=== Danube leisure complex ===
This park is located outside Galați proper on the road to Brăila. The complex has three swimming pools, houses, camping sites and a restaurant. There is also a western club that is equipped with a pool, restaurant, bar and cafe.

==== Waterfront ====
The waterfront is a green recreational area for walking, sports competitions and recitals. Boats moored on the shores of the Danube are converted into restaurants. Also, there are many original iron relics and a statue of Nicolae Balcescu.

==== Danube Waves Beach ====
The beach is located in south-west Galați. Popular in the summer, it has two large pools and three smaller pools for children, each with a slide. There is a beach, some restaurants and shower facilities.

==== Brateș beach ====
This is a private beach with clean sand situated on the left bank of Lake Brates. Nearby is the Galați–Bereștiul Barlad railway line.

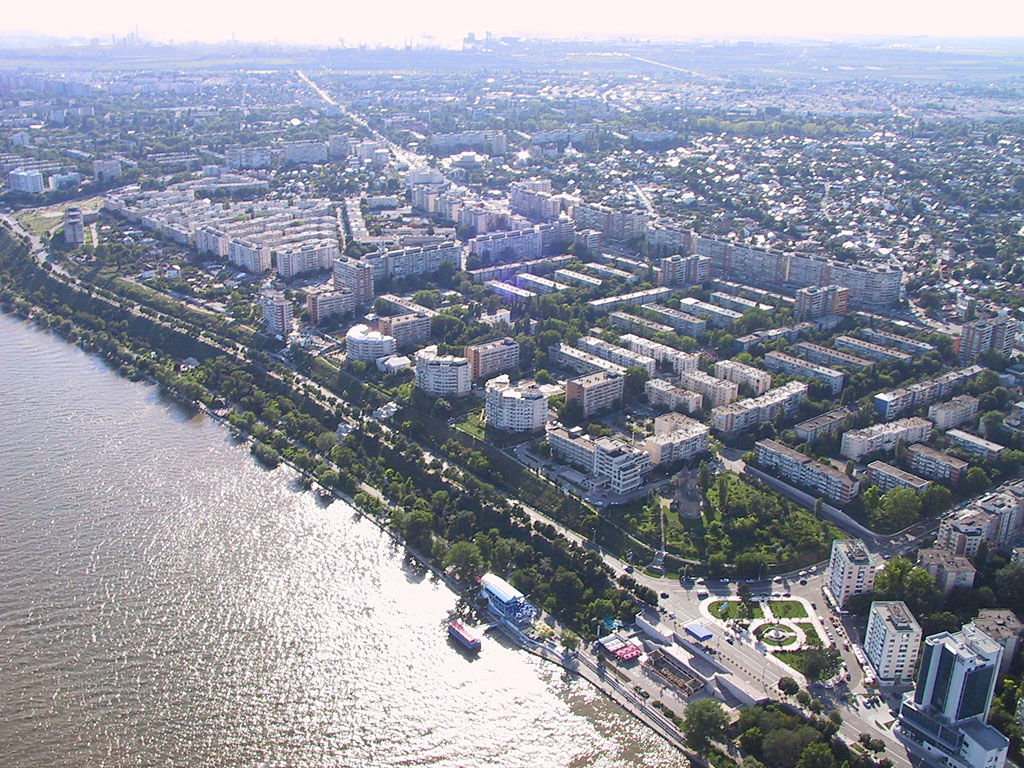
View from the old port

=== Neighborhoods ===
- Port
- Centru
  - Gară
  - Parc Rizer
  - Campus Universitar
- Mazepa 1
- Mazepa 2
- Țiglina 1
- Țiglina 2
- Țiglina 3 (Micro 16)
- Țiglina 4 (Micro 17 and Micro 18)
- Bariera Traian
- Traian Nord
- Barboși
- I.C. Frimu
  - Siderurgiștilor Est
  - Siderurgiștilor Vest
- Danube
  - Micro 13a
  - Micro 13b
  - Micro 14
  - Micro 19
  - Micro 20
  - Micro 21
- Patinoar
- Aviației
  - Micro 38
  - Micro 39a
  - Micro 39b
  - Micro 39c
  - Micro 40
- Filești
- Bădălan
- Lozoveni
- Dimitrie Cantemir

== Cultural life ==
=== Theatres ===
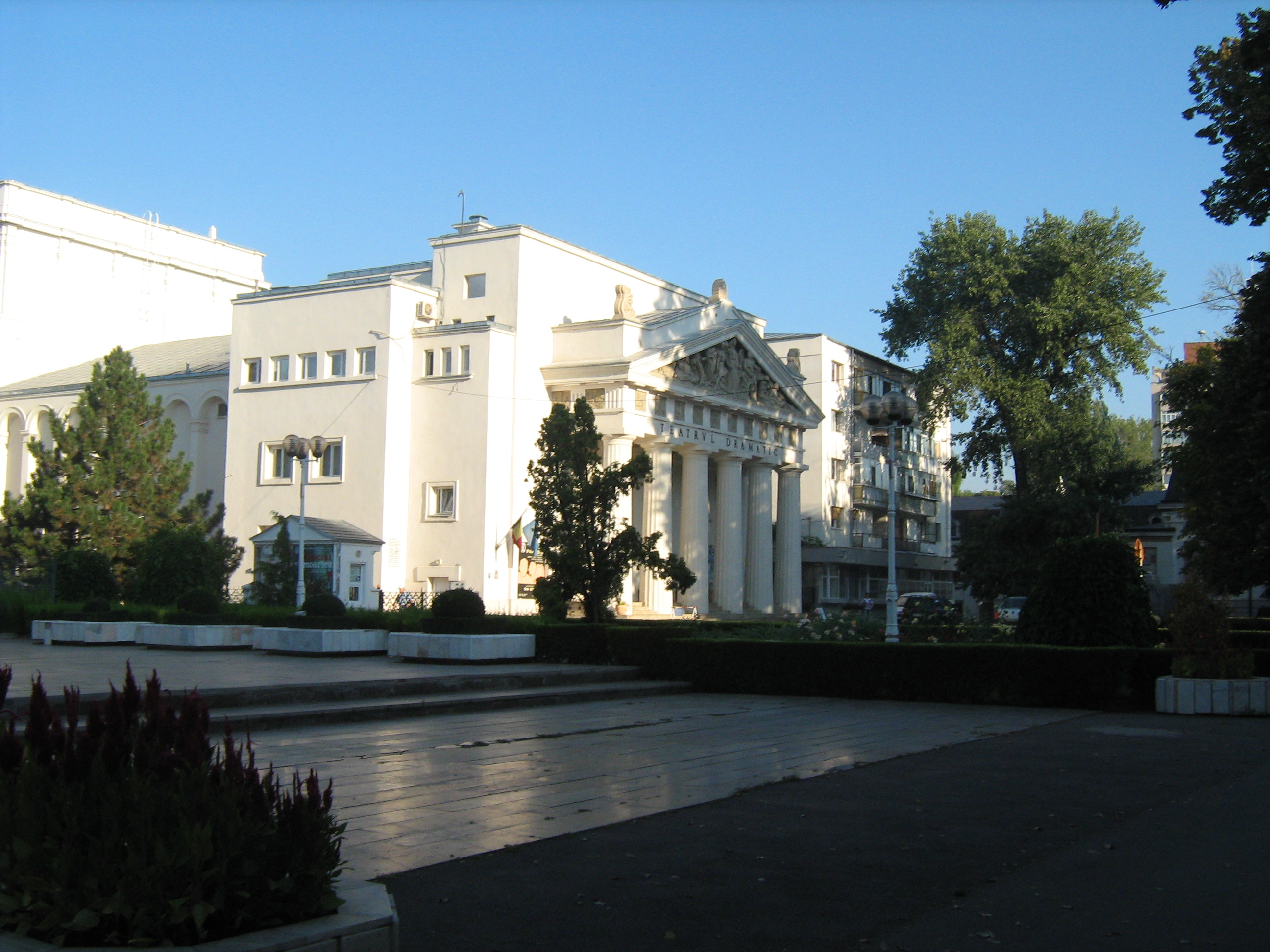
Fani Tardini Drama Theatre

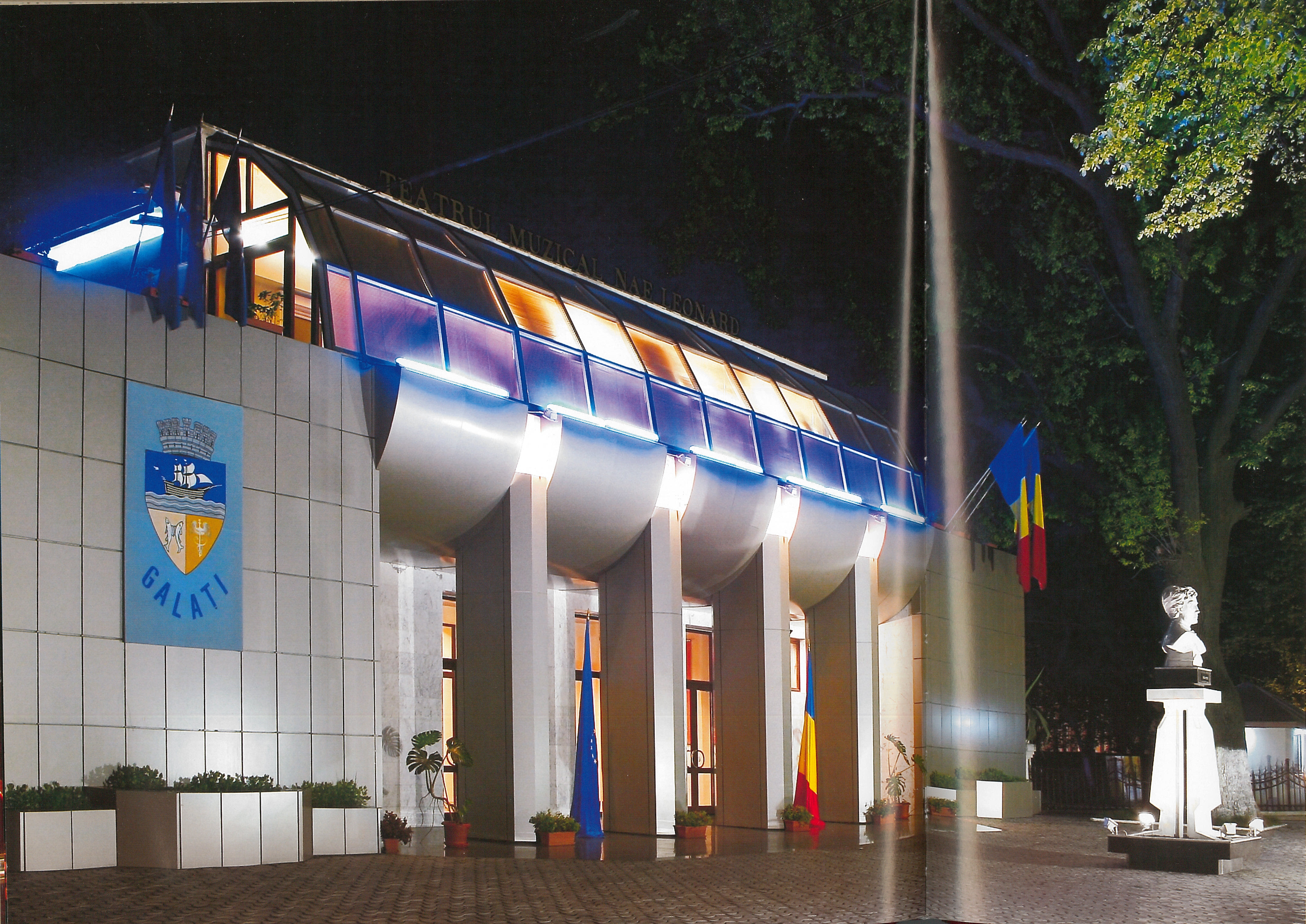
Nae Leonard National Theatre of Opera and Operetta

==== Fani Tardini Drama Theatre ====
This theatre was opened in 1955. It is named after the actress Fani Tardini (1823–1908). The theatre supports a yearly comedy festival, "Festingal".

==== Nae Leonard National Theatre of Opera and Operetta ====
Nae Leonard was known locally as "the prince of the operetta". Opened in 1956, the Nae Leonard National Theatre of Opera and Operetta was originally called "The Theatre of Operetta and Variety Art of Galați County".

==== Gulliver Theatre ====
The Gulliver Theatre was opened on 1 October 1952. It is devoted to children's theatre such as puppetry, for example.

=== Museums ===
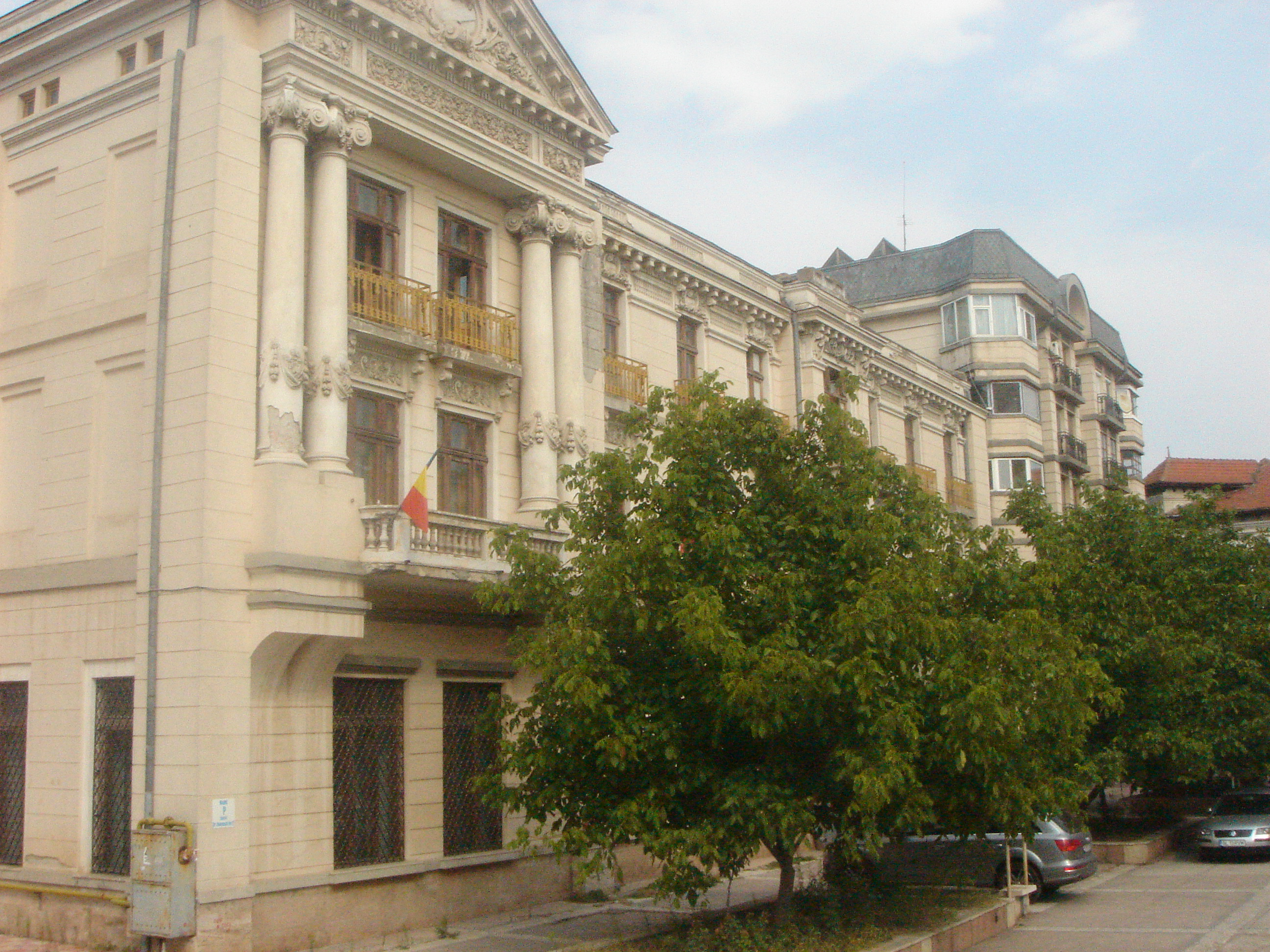
Galați History Museum

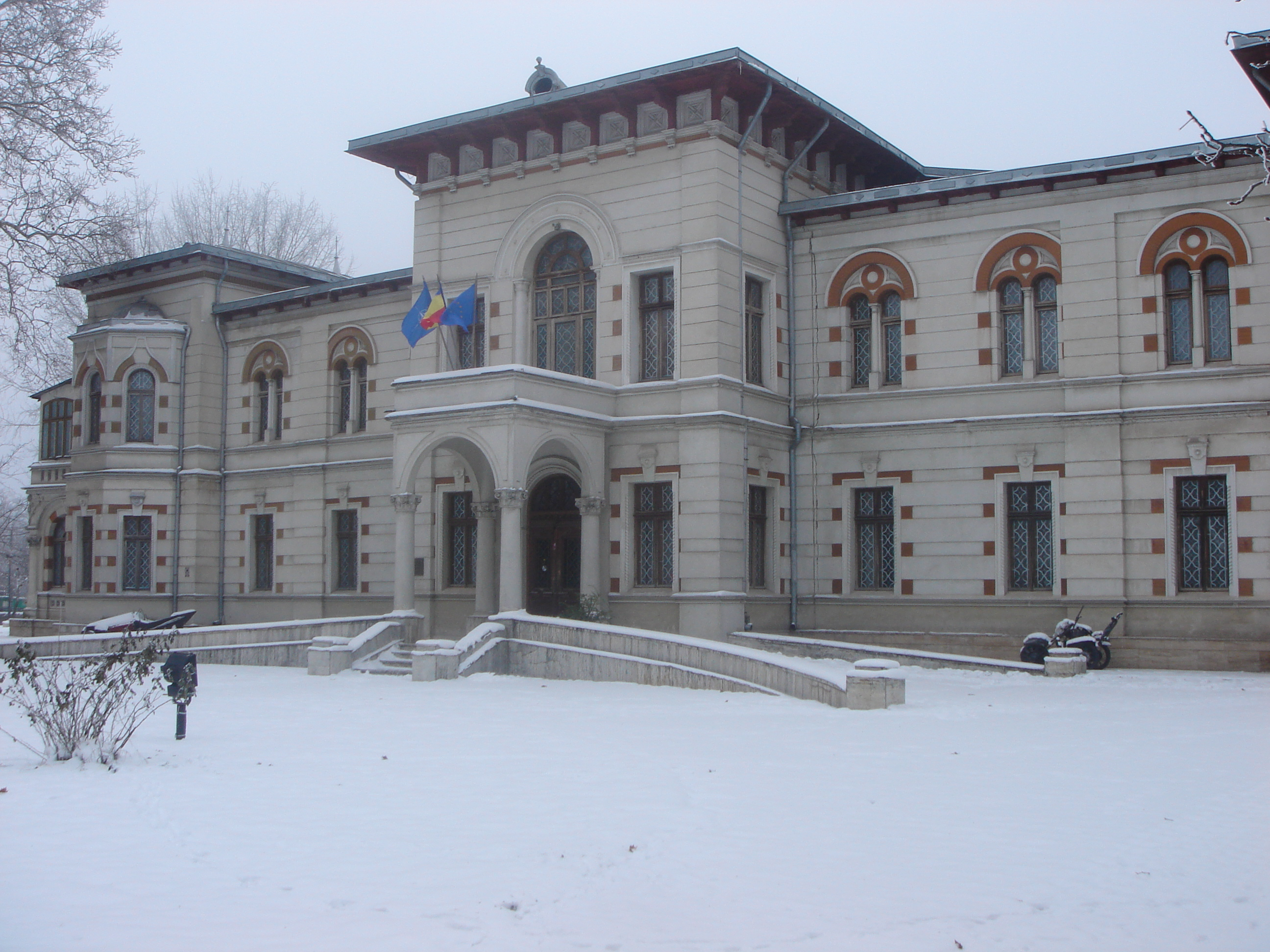
Visual Arts Museum

==== Natural Sciences Museum Complex ====
The Botanical Gardens on the south bank, hosts a 7-meter (23 ft) planetarium. There is also an aquarium displaying rare species of the Danube basin and the Mediterranean Sea as well as exotic fish.

==== Galați History Museum ====
The museum was inaugurated on 24 January 1939. This was the 80th anniversary of the union of the Romanian principalities. It is housed in the residence of Cuza, Galați's chief magistrate. In 1951, after World War II, scientific activity resumed at the museum. In 1956, some items were donated to the Natural History museum and the museum of art. The finds from Tirighina-Bărboși are housed in this museum.

==== Alexandru Ioan Cuza Memorial House ====
Cuza's former residence houses a retrospective display of his life.

==== Visual Arts Museum ====
When the Galați visual arts museum opened in 1967, it was the first contemporary arts museum in Romania. It has halls and outdoor exhibit spaces. There are also spaces for artists' workshops. The heritage section exhibits Romanian art in the second half of the nineteenth and avant-garde art from the twentieth century.

==== Galați Village Museum ====
This museum at the entrance to the Garboavele forest has small village buildings to display the traditional Romanian life in the Lower Danube.

==== House of Collections ====
This museum has philatelic and numismatic collections. It is situated near the Memorial House of Alexandru Ioan Cuza.

=== Rivalry with Brăila ===
Galați has a deep rivalry with neighbouring Brăila. This conflict has a long history and has reached the point of being studied by academics. In fact, a group of Romanian researchers have already published the book Galați - Brăila. Trecut. Actualitate. Perspective ("Galați - Brăila. Past. Present. Perspectives").

== Economy ==
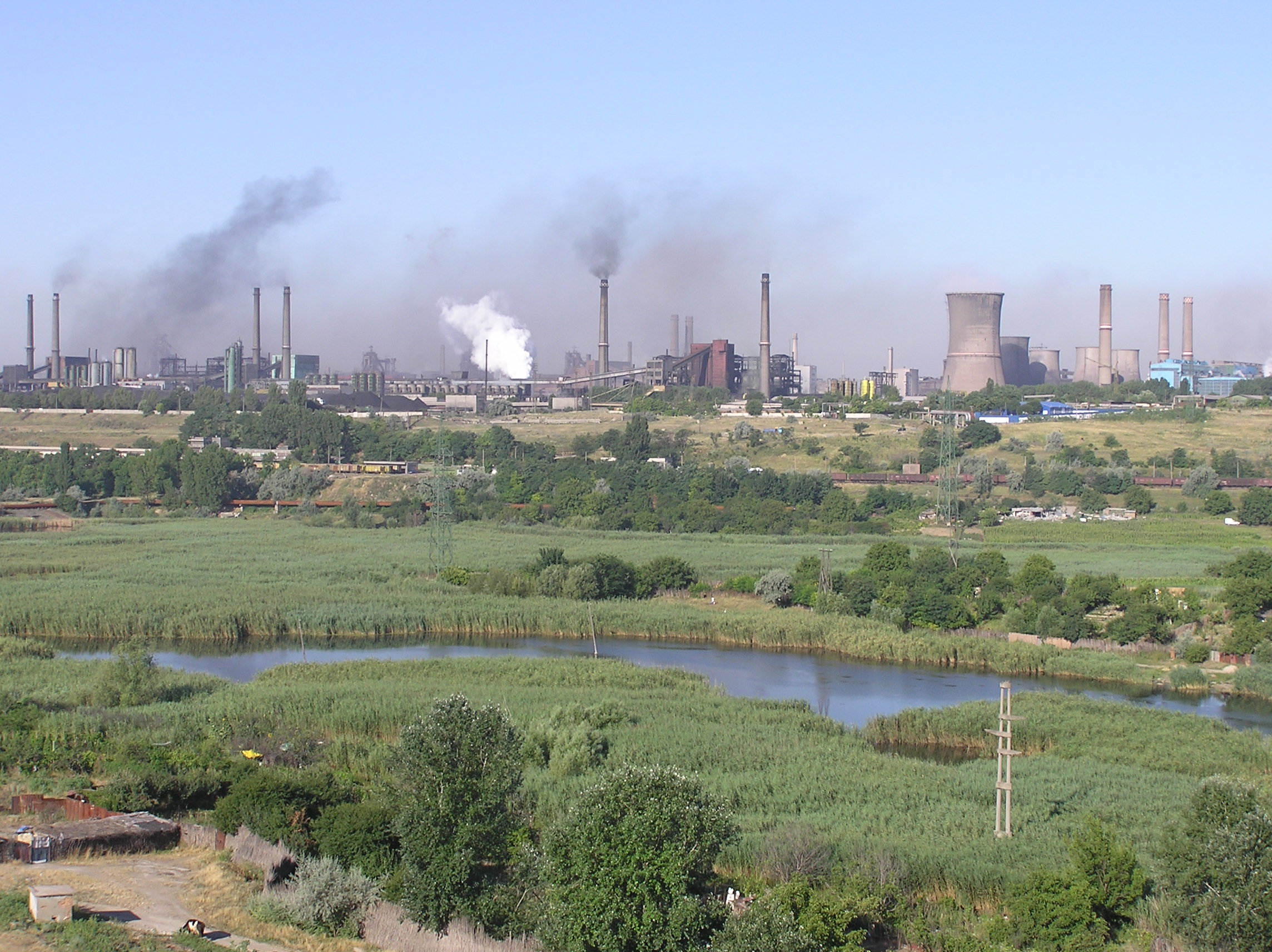
Galați steel works in 2006.

Galați has the largest iron and steel plant in Romania, the Galați steel works, which was state-owned until 2001, now owned by Liberty House Group. It is still commonly referred to as "Sidex", its old name.

Romania's largest shipyard is located in Galați. It benefits from easy access to the Black Sea and from its co-location with the Liberty Galați steel works.

Galați is also a border checkpoint to Moldova.

== Demographics ==
Historical population

Year	Pop.	±%
1859	26,050	—
1900	62,678	+140.6%
1912	71,641	+14.3%
1930	100,611	+40.4%
1941	95,545	−5.0%

Year	Pop.	±%
1948	80,411	−15.8%
1956	95,646	+18.9%
1966	151,412	+58.3%
1977	238,292	+57.4%
1992	326,141	+36.9%

Year	Pop.	±%
2002	298,861	−8.4%
2011	249,432	−16.5%
2021	217,851	−12.7%

Source: Census data, 1930–1948.

=== City proper ===
As of 2021 census data, 217,851 inhabitants live within the city limits, a decrease from the figure recorded at the 2011 census.

=== Ethnography ===
The largest ethnic group in Galați are Romanians (98.54%). The second largest but less than 1% of the total are the Roma (0.78%). In smaller numbers are Lipovans (0.07%), Greeks (0.07%) and Hungarians (0.09%). Other groups number 0.27% in all.

=== Metropolitan area ===
The metropolitan area is proposed to be formed from the cities of Galați and Brăila.

== Education ==
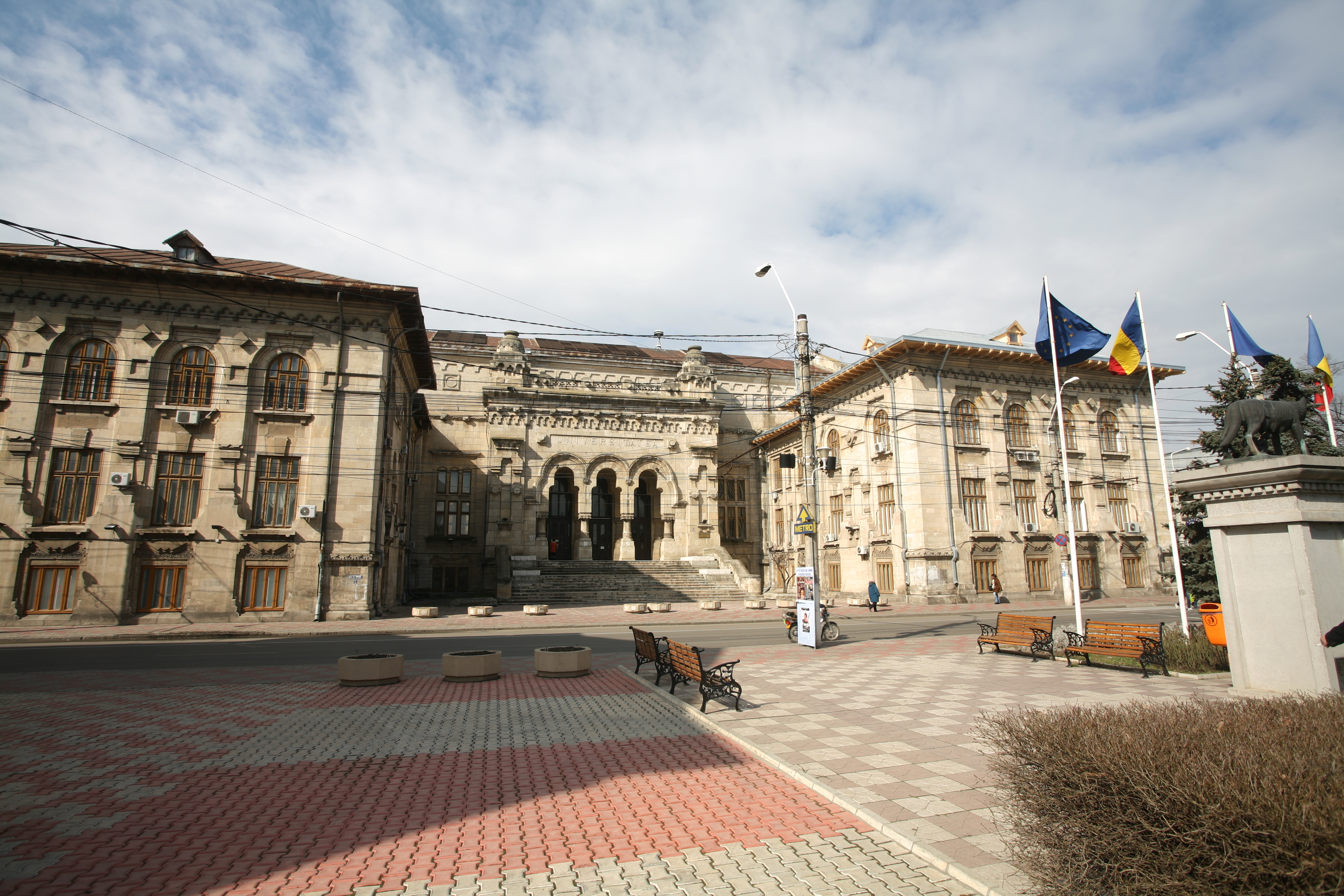
The main building of the University of Galați

Galați has educational facilities catering to all ages and scholastic levels. School Nr. 24 (Holy Archangels Michael and Gabriel) is the oldest school in the county. It was founded in 1832. In 1896 it was located inside the Mitoc Monastery. On 26 October 1896, the current school building was inaugurated.

The University of Galați, founded in 1974, includes 11 faculties (with two unique faculties in Romania: The Faculty of Naval Architecture and Department of Food Science and Engineering) and 3 colleges.

The "Danubius University" is a private institution with departments in legal, economic and social studies fields.

Galați also hosts several specialized research institutes. Four are unique within Romania: Icepronav (Research and Design Institute for Shipbuilding), Uzinsider Engineering (Institute for Research and Design for flat metal products), the Research Institute of Fish and the Wine Research Station Targu Bujor.

In February 2013, Galați was the host city of the general meeting of the National Student Association, a forum of the Romanian Ministry of Education.

=== Libraries ===
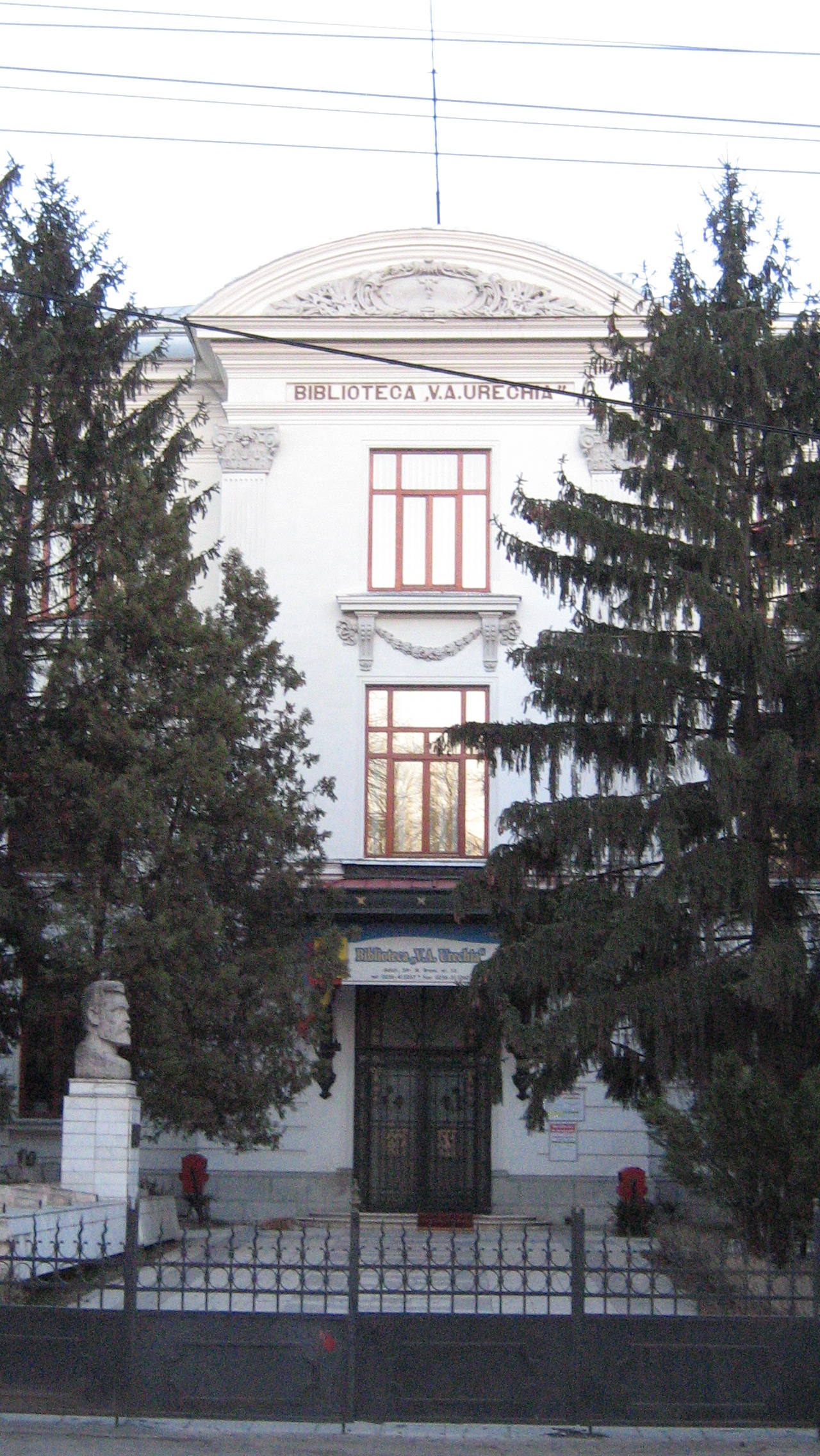
V. A. Urechia Library

In 1889, the V. A. Urechia Library was founded through the benevolence of Vasile Alexandrescu Urechia. In 1991, the library moved to a new purpose-built site. The library maintains its own local history collection as well as a rare book collection.

The LCMHF library was established in 1939. It is associated with teacher training and hosts an active literary circle.

== Transportation ==
=== Public transport ===
Public transport in Galați is provided by a combination of trams, trolleybuses and buses (all of which are operated by Transurb, an agency of the municipality).

=== Rail ===
Galați railway station has direct train services to cities such as Bucharest, Cluj-Napoca, Brașov and Iași all year and in the summer to Constanța.

== Galați in popular culture ==
=== Explosion ===
Explosion (1973) is a communist film made entirely in Galați. It is based on a true incident involving a Panamanian vessel, loaded with ammonium nitrate, which threatened to explode and destroy Galați and Brăila.

=== Dracula ===
In Bram Stoker's novel Dracula, Galați ("Galatz") is the port at which Count Dracula disembarked from the Czarina Catherine on his way back to Transylvania.

=== Meta Tempesta ===
This is a film about tunnels built in the ruins of Tirighina being used to protect Germans in World War II. It was based on a play called The road to Constanta.

=== Danube Waves ===
This is a film made in Bucharest, in the "Film Production Center", Buftea. It was directed by Liviu Ciulei, from a screenplay by Dumitru Munteanu Caraba and Francis. It stars Irina Petrescu, who makes her debut as the wife of a barge driver. Lazarus Vrabie plays an undercover officer. Ciulei is the barge driver. Lucian Pintilie played the part of a German soldier.

=== Other ===
Video of Galați is seen in tourist documentaries, documentaries about World War II and clips of Lautars singers.

== International relations ==
=== Twin towns – Sister cities ===
Galați has a number of Twin towns and sister cities:

Coventry, United Kingdom; (1963).; Piraeus, Greece (1985).; Wuhan, China (1987).; Pessac, France; (1991).; Limón, Costa Rica; (1992).; Hammond, United States (1997).; Mykolaiv, Ukraine; (2002).	Sevastopol, Ukraine; (2014).; Yalta, Ukraine; (2014).; Ancona, Italy.; Jesi, Italy; (2003).; Scottsbluff, United States; (2007); Mumbai, India; (2007).; Brindisi, Italy; (2007).

== Bibliography ==
- Paul Paltanea, History of Galați, Ed Porto Franco, Galați, 1994
- Neagu Djuvara, between West and East – Romanian Countries in the early modern era, Humanitas, Bucharest, 2007
- Ștefan Zeletin, Romanian bourgeoisie, Bucharest, 1991
- Galați City Hall about the city's geography and history
- Galați Prefecture, the official site
- Manual of Romania, 2008, NeswIn & The Money Channel, No.1
