= Frumușița River =

Frumușița River may refer to:

- Frumușița, a tributary of the Băiaș in Vâlcea County
- Frumușița, a tributary of the Chineja in Galați County

== See also ==
- Frumușița, a commune in Galați County, Romania
- Frumoasa River (disambiguation)
- Frumosu River (disambiguation)
