= Düwag Wadloper =

Family of diesel railcars and multiple units

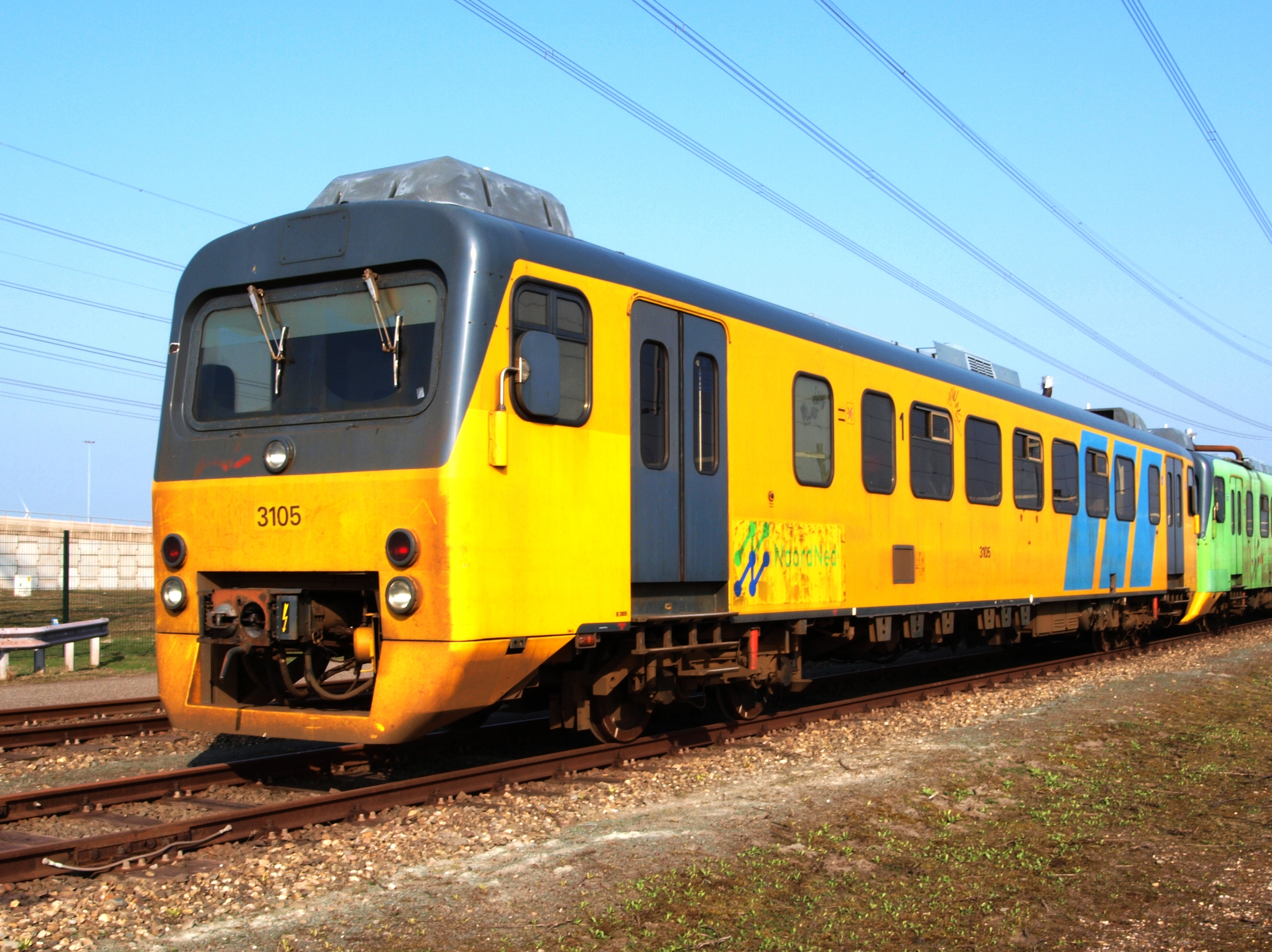
- Wadloper with the number 3105, in the colors of Nederlandse Spoorwegen
- Manufacturer: Düwag
- Constructed: 1981–1983
- Formation: s s+s

Specifications
- Width: 2,856 millimetres (9.370 ft)
- Height: 3,600 millimetres (11.8 ft)
- Platform height: 1,220 millimetres (4.00 ft)
- Wheel diameter: 840 millimetres (2.76 ft)
- Maximum speed: 100 kilometres per hour (62 mph)
- Prime mover: Cummins NT 855 R4
- Transmission: hydraulic
- Braking system: Knorr

Düwag Wadloper is a family of diesel railcars (type DH1, Polish SN82 series) and diesel multiple units (type DH2, Polish SN83 series) produced by the German Düwag plant in Düsseldorf. Between 1981 and 1983, a total of 50 vehicles of this kind were built specifically for the Dutch Nederlandse Spoorwegen railroad. At the beginning of the 21st century, they were mainly operated by private carriers; in 2006 they began to be phased out, and in 2008 they were sold to other countries. The trains went to carriers from Poland, Argentina and Romania. They were operated by Polregio, Masovian Railways and Silesian Railways, and also used by Trenes de Buenos Aires to operate a cross-border service between Argentina and Uruguay. They currently operate services connecting Argentina with Paraguay, and are operated in Poland by SKPL Cargo (mainly in the Subcarpathian Voivodeship), as well as on several lines in Romania.

== History ==
=== Origins ===
In the early 1970s, Dutch railroads Nederlandse Spoorwegen faced the need to replace a total of 76 Type DE1 diesel railcars and Type DE2 units called Blue Angels (Blauwe Engelen). The operation of these vehicles dating from 1953 to 1955 should have ended in the 1980s, but traffic had to be maintained on the routes they served. In 1976, in view of the situation, a team was formed to resolve the issue of endangered routes. In 1977, it was decided to preserve service on the side lines with new trains that were cheaper to operate.

On February 4, 1978, the carrier hired German unit 627 008 for two weeks of test runs, after which they began looking for a supplier of new rolling stock. German manufacturers Waggonfabrik Uerdingen and Linke-Hofmann-Busch submitted their bids. The first manufacturer's proposal of Ym wagons was rejected due to outdated design and excessive fuel consumption, while the VT2E vehicles offered by the second factory were dropped because of insufficient parameters and too high a price.

In the end, it was decided to cooperate with Germany's Düwag, which produced the 627 008 vehicle under test. Its parameters were deemed appropriate, and the vehicles for the Dutch carrier were made similar to the Deutsche Bahn railroad's 627 and 628 class cars.

=== Production ===
Between 1981 and 1982, 31 DH2 two-car sets were produced at the Düwag plant in Düsseldorf, while 19 DH1 wagons were built at the same plant in 1983. The vehicles went to the Dutch railroads Nederlandse Spoorwegen, which named them Wadloper (Dutch for tidal flat wanderer) as a result of a competition held in 1983.

== Construction ==
=== Specifications ===
	DH1	DH2
Wagon layout	s	s+s
Axis layout	B′2′	2′B′+B′2′
Train body length	21,710 mm (855 inches)	42,850 mm (1,687 inches)
Total length	22,310 mm (878 inches)	43,450 mm (1,711 inches)
Maximum width	2,856 mm (112.4 inches)	
Maximum height	3,600 mm (140 inches)	
Platform height	1,220 mm (48 inches)	
Number and light of passenger doors	1×1,300 mm (51 inches)	2×1,300 mm (51 inches) + 2×800 mm (31 inches)
Number of seats fixed+reclining	56+7 54+7 (after conversion to SN82)	148+10 140+10 (after conversion to SN83)
Wheel diameter	840 mm (33 inches)	
Bogie base	2,000 mm (79 inches)	
Pivot spacing	14,100 mm (560 inches)	
Outer wheelbase	16,100 mm (630 inches)	37,240 mm (1,466 inches)
Mass	37,000 kg (82,000 pounds)	69,000 kg (152,000 pounds)
Number and power of engines	1×210 kW	2×210 kW
Fuel supply	750 l	1500 l
Maximum speed	100 km/h	

=== Train body ===
The design of the Wadloper family vehicles was similar to the 627 and 628 class. The exterior styling was simplified relative to the prototypes.

=== Interior ===
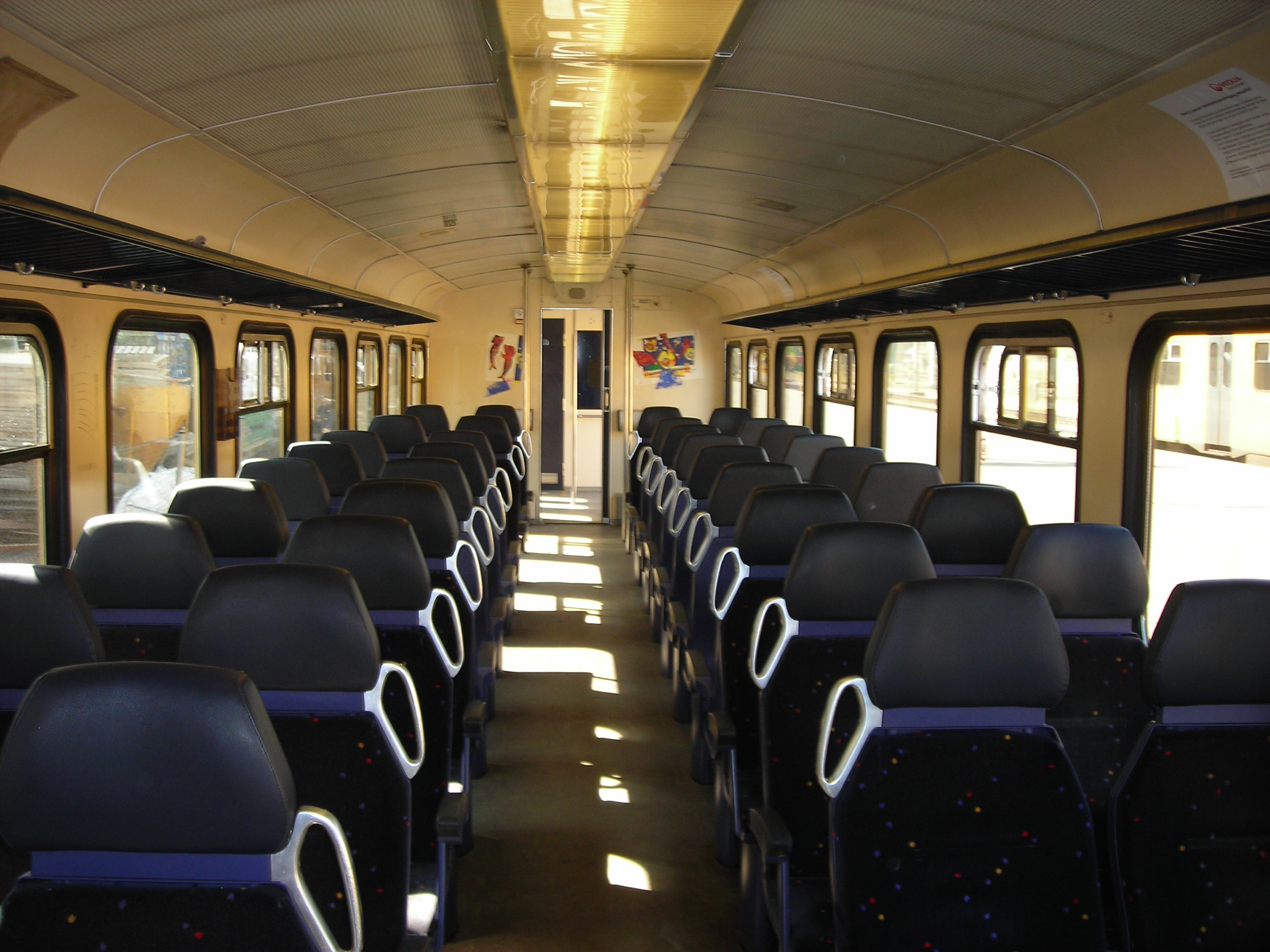
Passenger compartment of the DH2 unit numbered 3227

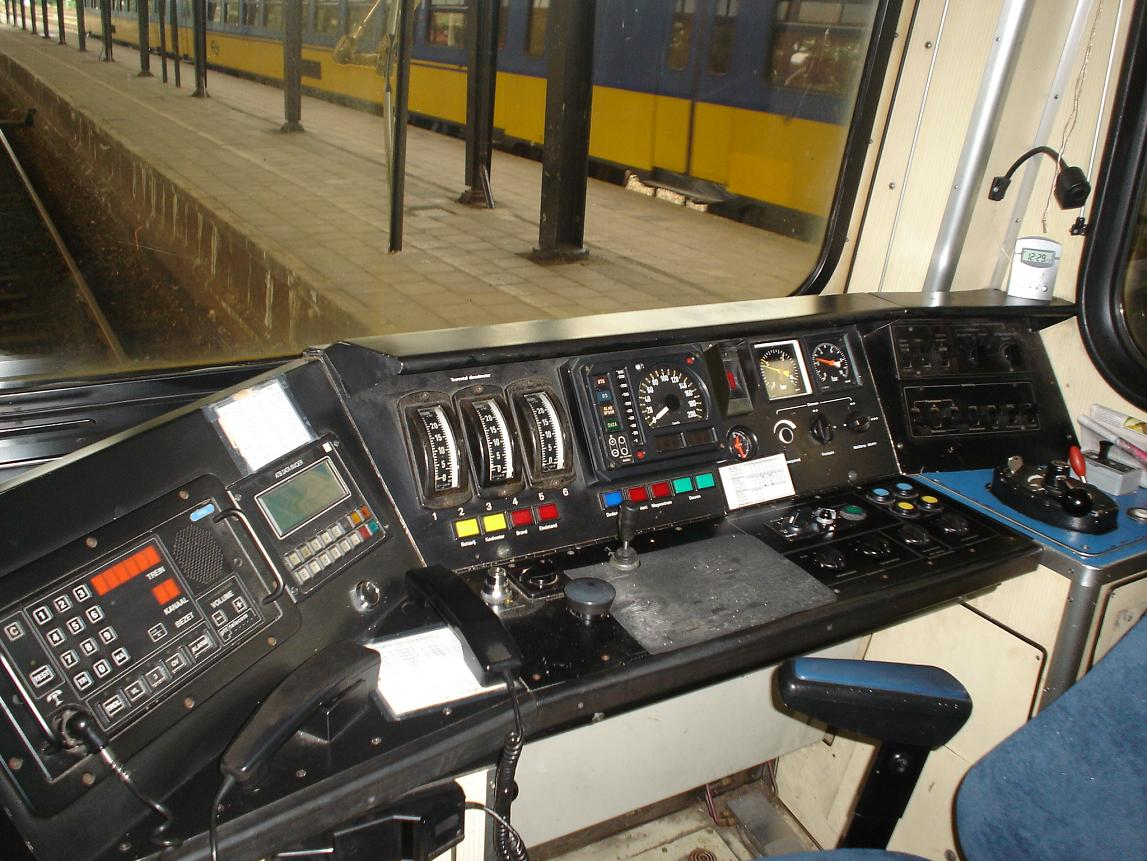
Driver's cab of DH1 wagon numbered 3101

Wagon DH1 has two door vestibules located behind the driver's cabs and one passenger compartment between them. One of the vestibules is larger and is designed to carry bigger luggage and bicycles, while the other vestibule can be used to access the lavatory. The passenger space is equipped with the company's Compin seats, which are arranged in a 2+2 arrangement along a passageway running along the axis of the vehicle.

In both wagons of the DH2 type, one of the cabins was replaced with a pressurized inter-car passage. The door vestibule located next to the eliminated cabin was moved closer to the passageway and, in addition, the width of the entrance door in this vestibule was reduced, which, combined with the unchanged length of the cars, led to an increase in the passenger compartment. In addition, only one of the carriages has a toilet, while the other has been eliminated in favor of seats.

Bounce-and-slide entrance doors with a 1300 mm light in DH1 wagons and 1300 mm and 800 mm in DH2 units are used. Two entrance steps are installed at the door, and in DH1 they are pivoted at a standstill.

The interior is equipped with fluorescent lighting powered by 24 V DC.

=== Bogies ===
All vehicles of the DH1 and DH2 types are equipped with two-axle bogies. The diameter of all wheels is 840 mm, while the wheelbase is 2000 mm. Each DH1 wagon and each part of the DH2 unit is based on one rolling bogie and one driving bogie.

=== Power ===
The Wadlopers are powered by Cummins' company engines of the NT 855 R4 type. These are 210 kW internal combustion diesel engines equipped with six cylinders in an in-line arrangement. They use water cooling, which made it possible to reduce the machine's dimensions compared to the engines used in the 627/628 class vehicles. The manufacturer has specified the engines' service life at 15 years.

The engine drives both sets of bogie wheels through a Voith company hydraulic transmission type T211r. Type DH1 wagons have one such engine, while type DH2 units are equipped with two drive units. The fuel reserve of the DH1-type vehicles is 750 liters, while that of the DH2 trainsets is 1,500 liters.

Compared to the prototypes, electronic equipment and magnetic brakes were abandoned. A Knorr brake was installed.

== Operation ==
Country	Carrier	Type	Number of units	Label	Years of operation	Total number
Netherlands	Nederlandse Spoorwegen (1981–2002) Connexxion (2002–2006) Arriva (2006–2007) Veolia Transport (2007–2008)	DH1	19	3101 ÷ 3119	1983–2008	50
Netherlands	Nederlandse Spoorwegen (1981–2002) Connexxion (2002–2006) Arriva (2006–2007) Veolia Transport (2007–2008)	DH2	31	3201 ÷ 3231	1981–2008	50
Poland	Polregio/Polregio (2010–2012, from 2020) Masovian Railways (2010–2011) Silesian Railways (2012–2014) SKPL Cargo (from 2018) Lower Silesian Railways (2020–2021)	DH1	3	SN82-001 ÷ 003	2010–2014 from 2018	10
Poland	Polregio/Polregio (2010–2012, from 2020) Masovian Railways (2010–2011) Silesian Railways (2012–2014) SKPL Cargo (from 2018) Lower Silesian Railways (2020–2021)	DH2	7	SN83-001 ÷ 007	2010–2014 from 2018	10
Argentina Uruguay	Trenes de Buenos Aires	DH1	? (15)	31xx	2011–2012	? (25)
Argentina Uruguay	Trenes de Buenos Aires	DH2	6 (10)	32xx	2011–2012	? (25)
Argentina Paraguay	Trenes Argentinos	DH2	2	F-1xx	from 2014	2
Romania	Transferoviar Călători	DH2	7 (13)	78-32xx	from 2010	7 (13)

=== Netherlands ===
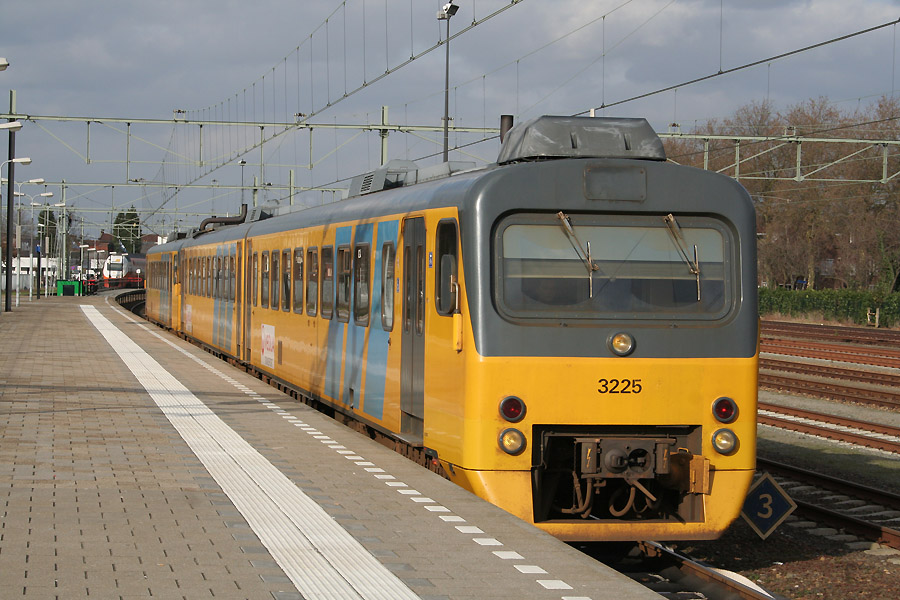
DH2 number 3225 in new colors of Nederlandse Spoorwegen

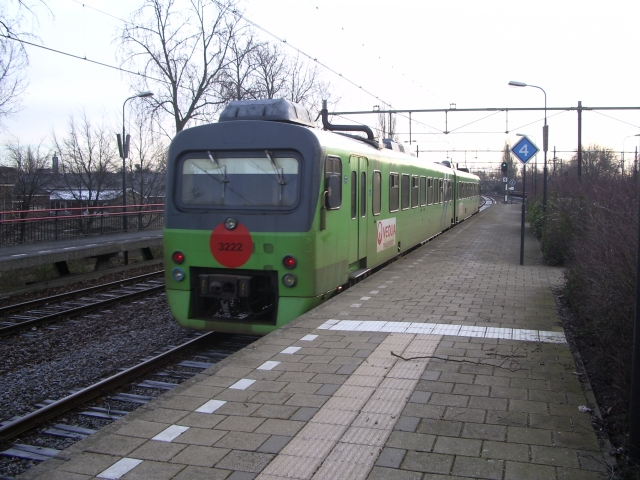
DH2 number 3222 of the carrier NoordNed

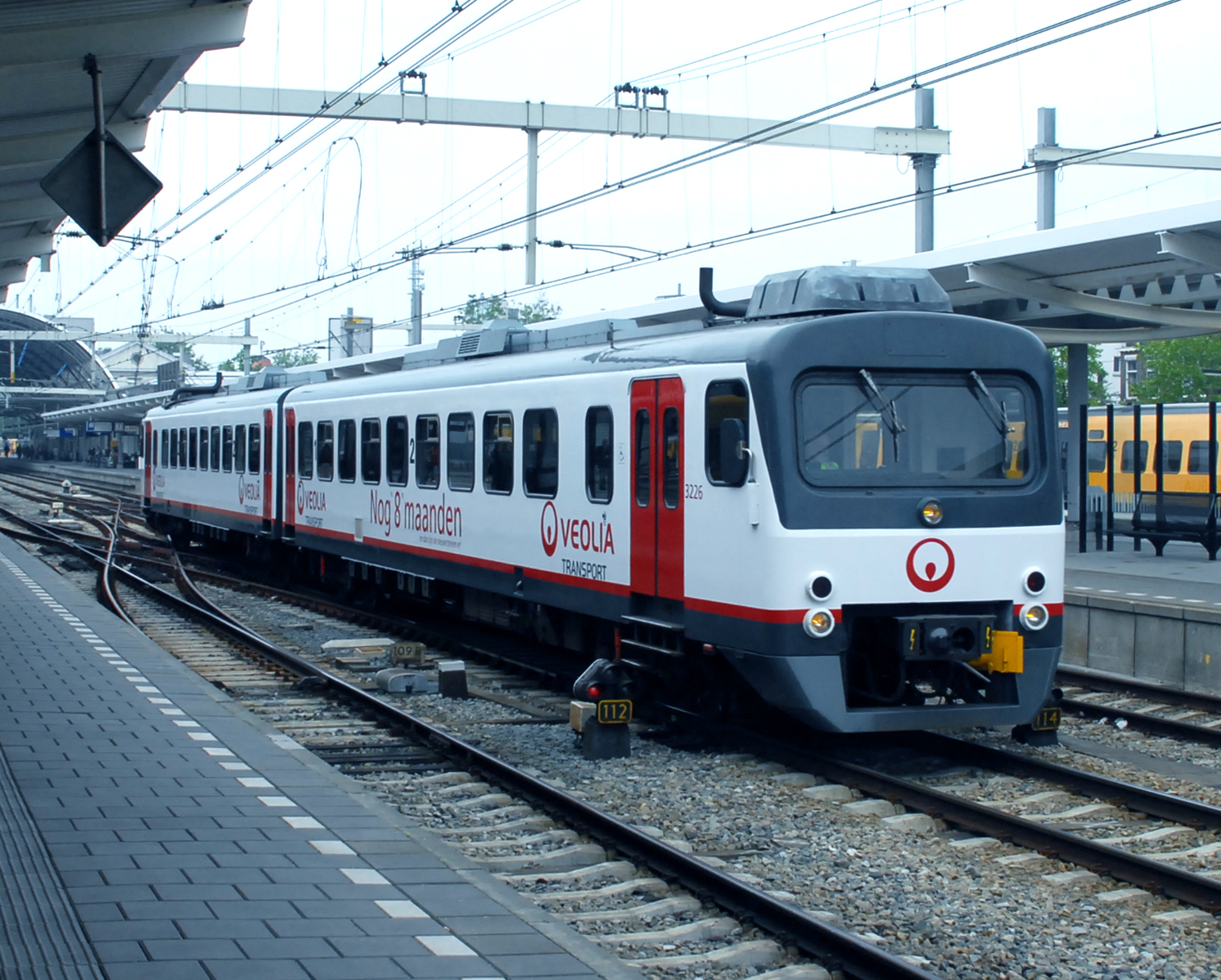
DH2 number 3226 in the colors of Veolia Transport

The Wadlopers made their debut in the Netherlands in November 1981 on the Groningen – Delfzijl line, and in March 1982 they were also directed to operate the Groningen – Leeuwarden line, while in May 1982 they began running on the Groningen – Nieuweschans line. They could be found in diagonal traction with DM90-type units, which limited the maximum speed of the combined train to 90 km/h. Servicing of the vehicles took place in Groningen.

In November 1982, there were problems with the electromagnets installed in the bogies, which misread commands and spontaneously changed the settings of the ground safety system devices. The vehicles of both series were then taken out of service and were restored after the issue was resolved in March 1983.

In the 1980s and 1990s, DH1 wagons and DH2 units ran on the Groningen and Leeuwarden outbound lines, and there were plans to divert them to operate the Rotterdam – Zwolle line. There were technical problems at the time, as the existing traffic safety system on this line did not work with the equipment installed in the vehicles, so from January 1992 to January 1994 the Wadlopers were run with 6400-series locomotives.

In 1995, a decision was made to modernize the DH1 and DH2 vehicles. Between February and June 1996, the NS Railway repair shops in Tilburg carried out repairs involving the replacement of seats in the passenger compartments and a change in colors.

In September 2002, the vehicles were taken over by the carrier Connexxion, which changed the vehicles' paint scheme and put them into service on the Almelo – Mariënberg line.

In 2006, the DH1 and DH2 vehicles went to Arriva, which operated with them the lines:

- Leeuwarden – Harlingen Haven/Sneek – Stavoren,
- Leeuwarden – Groningen – Nieuweschans/Roodeschool/Delfzijl.

In 2006, the phasing out of the vehicles began and in 2008 the operation of the DH1 and DH2 in the Netherlands was finally terminated. The trains, which were less than 30 years old, were decided to be sold. The first offer to buy two DH1 wagons and two DH2 units came from Albania. However, the deal fell through, and the vehicles were ordered by a regional carrier from Slovakia. According to the agreement, the rolling stock was to be modernized at the ZNTK Minsk Mazowiecki plant before reaching its new owner, but in the end the two DH vehicles already imported to Poland, numbered 3222 and 3226, remained at the ZNTK site in Paterek, and the two DH1 wagons went to South America. In the meantime, a Czech carrier also made a purchase offer, but eventually vehicles from the Netherlands in a total of 46 units (19 DH1 wagons and 27 DH2 units) went to Poland, Argentina and Romania.

=== Poland ===
==== Wadlopers in Poland ====
Label		Modernizer	Year of modernization	History of the owners	History of operation	Status
Dutch	Polish	Modernizer	Year of modernization	History of the owners	History of operation	Status
3102	SN82-001	ZNTK Poznań	2009	Sigma Tabor (2009–2020) SKPL Cargo (from 2020)	Polregio (2010–2012) Silesian Railways (2012–2014) Polregio (from 2021)	Active
3105	SN82-002	ZNTK Paterek	2012	Sigma Tabor (2008–2019) SKPL Cargo (from 2019)	Silesian Railways (2012–2014) Lower Silesian Railways (2020–2021) Polregio (from 2021)	Active
3110	SN82-003	ZNTK Paterek	2012	Sigma Tabor (2009–2020) SKPL Cargo (from 2020)	Silesian Railways (2012–2014) Polregio (from 2021)	Active
3206	SN83-001	ZNTK Poznań	2009	Sigma Tabor (2009–2020) SKPL Cargo (from 2020)	Polregio (2010–2012) Silesian Railways (2012–2014)	Active
3207	SN83-002	ZNTK Poznań	2009	Sigma Tabor (2009–2019) SKPL Cargo (from 2019)	Polregio (2010–2012) Silesian Railways (2012–2014)	Under repair
3231	SN83-003	ZNTK Poznań	2009	Sigma Tabor (2009–2013) GPW (2013–2018) SKPL Cargo (from 2018)	Polregio (2010–2012) Silesian Railways (2012–2014) Lower Silesian Railways (2020–2021) Polregio (from 2021)	Active
3219	SN83-004	ZNTK Paterek	2010	Sigma Tabor (2008–2019) SKPL Cargo (from 2019)	Masovian Railways (2010–2011) Polregio (2011–2012) Silesian Railways (2012–2014) Polregio (from 2020)	Active
3222	SN83-005	ZNTK Paterek	2012	Sigma Tabor (2008–2020) SKPL Cargo (from 2020)	Silesian Railways (2012–2014) Polregio (from 2020)	Active
3225	SN83-006	H. Cegielski	2012	Sigma Tabor (2009–2020) SKPL Cargo (from 2020)	Silesian Railways (2013–2014) Polregio (from 2023)	Active
3226	SN83-007	ZNTK Paterek	2012	Sigma Tabor (2009–2020) SKPL Cargo (from 2020)	Silesian Railways (2013–2014) Polregio (from 2022)	Active

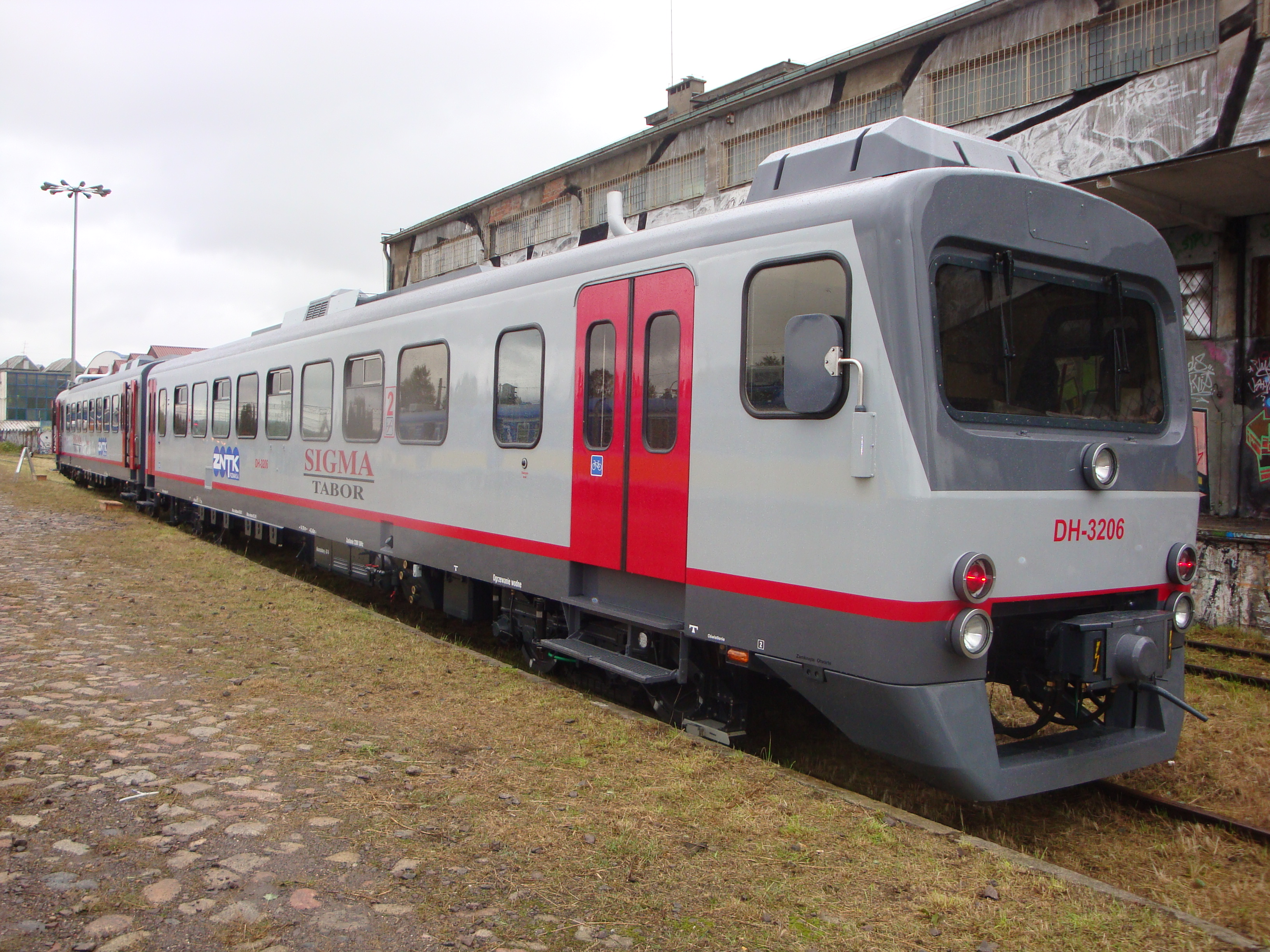
SN83-001 during Trako 2009 trade fair

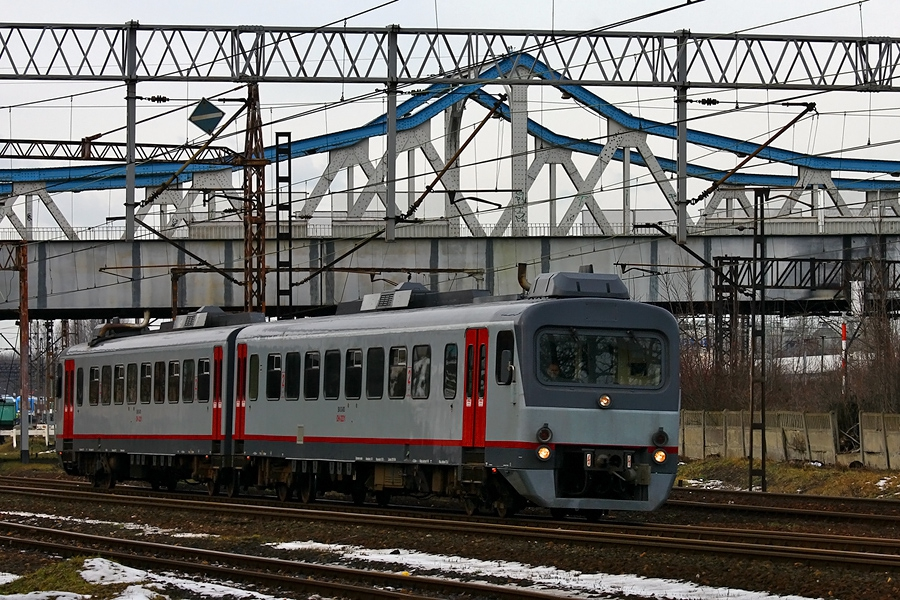
SN83-003 leased by Silesian Railways still in the colors of Sigma Tabor

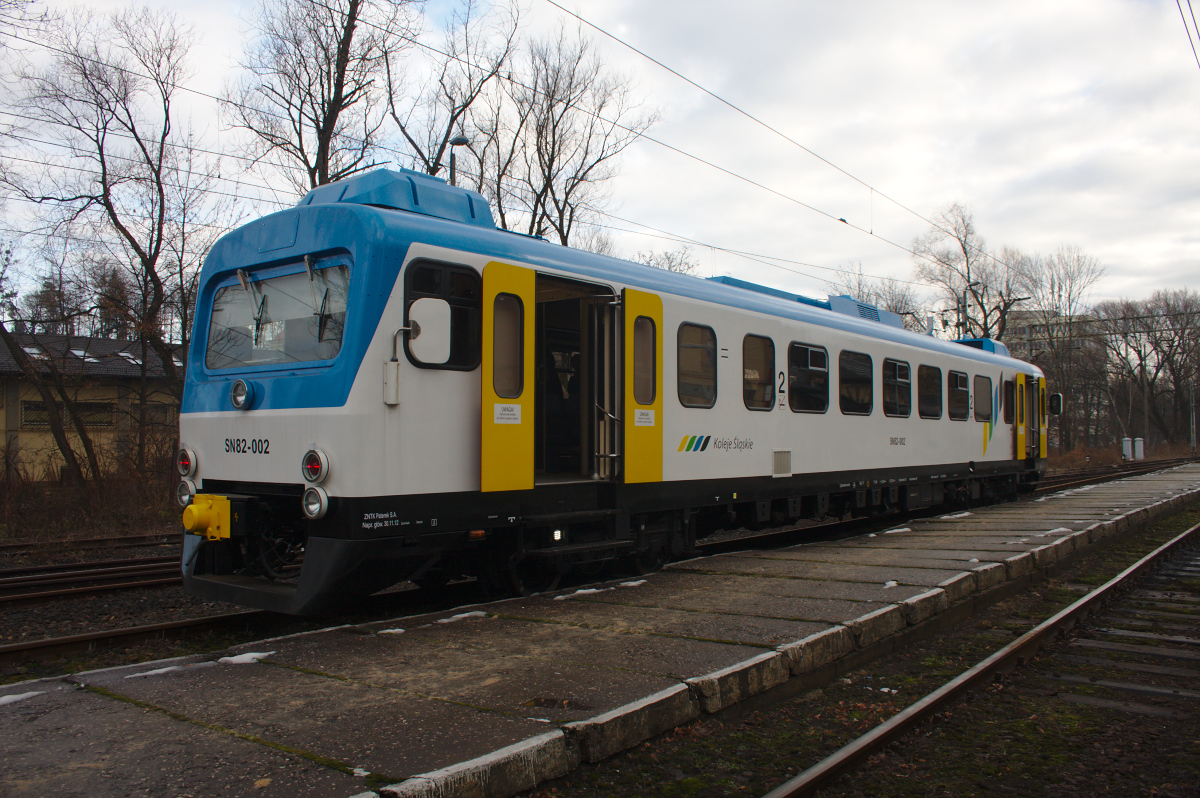
SN82-002 of the Silesian Railways at Cieszyn station

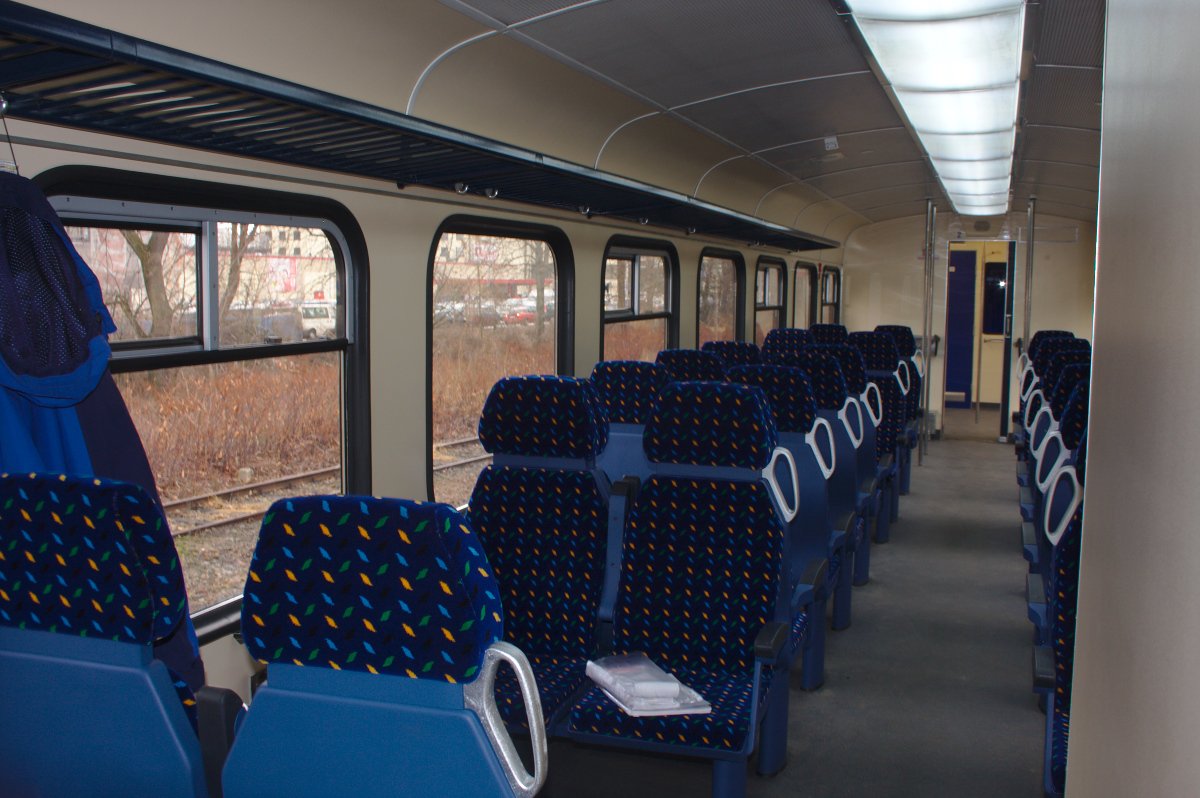
Passenger compartment of the Silesian SN82-002

In early 2009, Sigma Tabor became interested in the Wadloper vehicles on display. The company, despite the lack of an order for them, wanted to acquire them for lease to domestic carriers. Initially, 17 DH1 wagons and 29 DH2 units were planned to be purchased, but eventually fewer vehicles were delivered to Poland due to the ordering company's financial difficulties. In May, the company purchased the first three vehicles (one DH2 unit and two DH1 wagons), and in July another seven (six DH2 units and one DH1 wagon).

Sigma Tabor commissioned the adaptation of imported vehicles to Polish conditions to the ZNTK Poznań plant, which is part of the Sigma group. As part of the modernization, the interior layout was changed, the seats were replaced, their vandal-resistant upholstery was used, the interior wall coverings, floor coverings and interior lighting were replaced, and air conditioning was installed in the driver's cabs. Hydraulic systems and the installation of forced ventilation for the passenger section were upgraded. New headlights, a fire alarm system and an audible warning signal were installed, as well as automatic train braking, a radio-stop with radio-telephone, a dead man's switch, an electronic speedometer, and tilt steps to enable 300 mm high platforms. After the repair, combined with modernization, polonization and replacement of selected components with new ones, ZNTK Poznań obtained approval of DH1 and DH2 vehicles and estimated their service life at about 10–15 years.

In the first round, the Poznań plant modernized three DH2s and one DH1 vehicle, while more Wadlopers were rebuilt at ZNTK in Paterek. In 2009, the SN83-001 consist was presented at Trako fair in Gdańsk.

On June 11, 2010, Polregio began trial operation of the first two vehicles. Wagon DH1 served the Chojnice – Szczecinek line, and unit DH2 ran on the Chojnice – Tczew line. In the same year, all the rebuilt trains (3 sets of SN83 and 1 wagon of SN82) went to the Pomeranian Department of Regional Transport in Gdynia. By the autumn of 2012, they served lines:

- Tczew – Chojnice – Piła Główna/Szczecinek – Słupsk,
- Piła – Wałcz.

In August 2010, the SN83-004 unit was leased to Masovian Railways. On February 21, 2011, the vehicle was operating train No. 70321 between Ostrołęka and Tłuszcz, and at a level crossing on the Ostrołęka – Pasieki route the consist hit a truck. After repairs, the unit was handed over to Polregio and joined the vehicles operating services in the Chojnice area.

By mid-2012, a total of three DH1 wagons and four DH2 units had been modernized and given Polish markings.

In mid-2012, Silesian Railways became interested in leasing 8 vehicles. At the turn of November/December 2012, the carrier concluded an agreement with Sigma Tabor providing for the lease of three SN82 wagons and five SN83 units. In order to fulfill the agreement, another 3 vehicles of the SN83 series were modernized: 005 and 007 were rebuilt at ZNTK Paterek, while at H. Cegielski the SN83-006 unit was modernized, and the SN82-001, SN83-001 and 004 vehicles, which were previously running in the owner's colors, were overhauled and repainted in the carrier's colors. Trains numbered 3115 and 3215 were also brought to HCP-FPS, but were not modernized. Between December 8 and 19, 2012, 7 of the 8 ordered vehicles began operation. The last one, which was unit SN83-007, due to defects reported during final inspections carried out since December 20, 2012, was finally taken over and put into service on January 15, 2013. The Wadlopers were directed to service the routes:

- Gliwice – Strzelce Opolskie,
- Gliwice – Kędzierzyn-Koźle – Chałupki – Racibórz,
- Lubliniec – Częstochowa – Włoszczowa – Kielce – Żelisławice/Łazy,
- Katowice – Czechowice-Dziedzice – Cieszyn/Wadowice/Wodzisław Śląski/Rybnik/Chałupki,
- Katowice – Sosnowiec Główny – Sławków – Bukowno.

On July 19, 2013, a test run of the SN83-006 unit took place, but it ultimately did not enter service. At the end of 2014, Silesian Railways withdrew from service all vehicles of the SN82 and SN83 series.

=== The problem of ownership and attempted sales ===
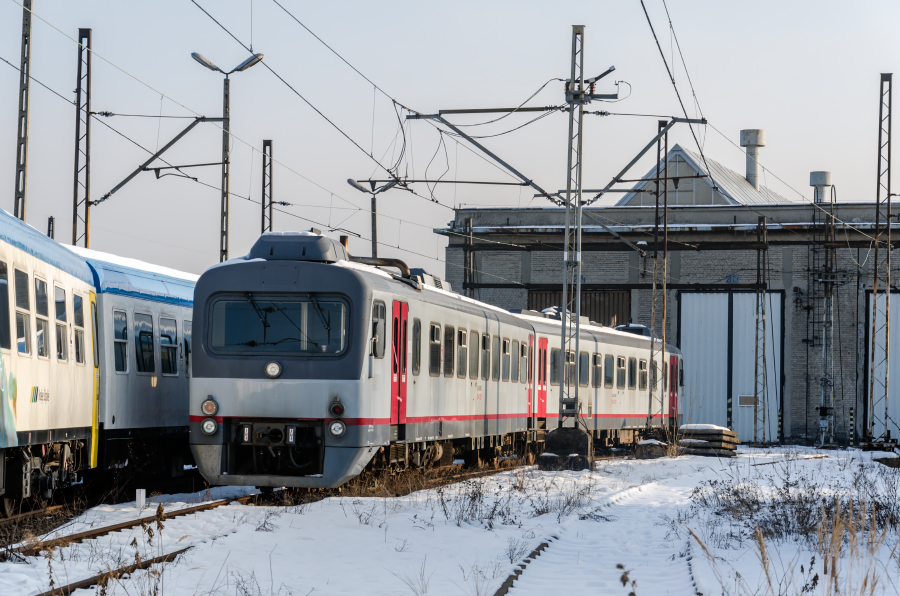
Unit SN83-003 put away in Katowice

In mid-2012, Silesian Railways became interested in the Wadlopers, as at the time they only operated one line, and as of December of that year they were supposed to be entrusted with carrying out rail passenger services in the entire Silesian voivodeship. For this reason, the search for any rolling stock began, and that's when Sigma Tabor came out with a proposal to import these vehicles, among others. Subsequently, Silesian Railways established a subsidiary company, Inteko, which was responsible for, among other things, mediating the carrier's rolling stock matters. Its CEO, however, was not employed, but received a consulting contract, which later led to a conflict of interest. The company was recapitalized by companies run by the CEO and his acquaintances, causing Silesian Railways to lose a sizable portion of its shares and, consequently, its control over Inteko. The subsidiary then began entering into contracts that were unfavorable to it and generating losses. Inteko then issued bonds, which were purchased by the Upper Silesian Fund and Silesian Railways, while the Upper Silesian Waterworks Company became the guarantor. Loans were also taken out, guaranteed by Silesian Railways and the Upper Silesian Waterworks Company, which had rolling stock as collateral. However, Inteko did not have the means to repay the debts, so the Upper Silesian Waterworks Company received the right to, among other things, four Wadlopers as a result of the transfer. Due to the modernization and polonization of the vehicles, however, their ownership was diluted and became the subject of disputes.

On July 23, 2013, the Upper Silesian Waterworks Company became the owner of unit SN83-003, and in September and December of the same year, two unmodernized vehicles set aside at H. Cegielski.

On January 27, 2015, the Bailiff at the District Court in Brzeg announced that on February 5, one DH1 wagon (SN82-002) and two DH2 unit (SN83-003 and 004), among others, would be put up for auction at the siding of the liquidated Polregio's Silesian Company. Ultimately, however, the auction did not take place. On September 3, the Bailiff at the District Court in Oleśnica announced the auction of two DH1 wagons (SN82-001 and 003) and four DH2 units (SN83-001, 005, 006 and 007), while on November 18, the Bailiff at the District Court for the City of Warsaw scheduled the auction of wagon SN82-002 and unit SN83-004. On November 8, 2016, the unit was again attempted to be auctioned by the Bailiff from Brzeg.

On June 30, 2016, the Upper Silesian Waterworks Company made its first attempt to sell two vehicles set aside at the H. Cegielski plant. On July 14, 2016, the company announced that another auction of this rolling stock would be held on July 28. On August 24, 2016, the next such auction was announced for September 8. On December 29, the company again put these vehicles up for sale, but this time in the form of a tender with the deadline for bids set for January 13, 2017. During the last, fourth attempt to sell, the vehicles were purchased for scrapping.

On April 14, 2017, meanwhile, the Upper Silesian Waterworks Company announced an auction on May 4 for, among other things, vehicle SN83-003, which was ultimately not sold at that time either. Subsequent auctions of this unit were announced on June 8 and July 21, while on August 18 the auction was re-announced with a deadline of September 14. At the end of 2017 and the beginning of 2018, a fifth auction was held, with three bidders. The proposal of the carrier SKPL Cargo was considered the most favorable, and they eventually bought the SN83-003 unit and the other two vehicles owned by the Upper Silesian Waterworks Company.

=== New life at SKPL Cargo ===
On January 11, 2018, SKPL purchased the SN83-003 from the Upper Silesian Waterworks Company, which then underwent repairs. After a hiatus of more than four years, SN83-003 was the first vehicle in the Düwag Wadloper series to return to service in August of the same year, receiving the carrier's new paint scheme. In 2019, SKPL increased its fleet of Düwag Wadlopers by purchasing SN83-004 and SN82-002, which was then transported on July 5 from the Silesian Railways's base in Katowice to Zagórze for repairs. The repair of the SN82-002 motor car was completed in September. In November 2019, SKPL purchased two SN83s, numbered 002 and 004. The latter, like SN82-002, was transported from Katowice to Zagórze where it was repaired. Soon SN82-001, SN83-006 and SN83-007 were purchased and transported to the carrier's base in Ostrów Wielkopolski. Then in February 2020, the last vehicles SN82-003 and SN83-005 were purchased, finally buying out the entire fleet of Wadlopers from the bailiff. In April 2020, the repair of SN82-003 was completed and as of April 21 it can operate passenger traffic.

Vehicles operated by SKPL have their names, and they are:

DH1:

- SN82-001 – Marzanna.
- SN82-002 – Sylwia.
- SN82-003 – Weronika.

DH2:

- SN83-001 – Jacek.
- SN83-003 – Zbyszek.
- SN83-004 – Mieciu.
- SN83-005 – Andrzej.
- SN83-006 – Wojtek.
- SN83-007 – Leon.

The remaining SN83 vehicles have not yet received their own names due to the lack of repairs and repainting carried out. At the end of January 2022, as part of the 30th finale of the GOCC campaign, the opportunity to give its name to unit SN83-001 was donated to the charity.

On February 4, 2020, Lower Silesian Railways signed a contract with SKPL for the lease of vehicles: SN82-002 and SN83-003. The information was confirmed by SKPL a day later on its Facebook page. The vehicles ran on Lower Silesian Railways services from February until the end of April, when their lease was suspended due to COVID-19 pandemic restrictions until September 7, when both vehicles returned to Lower Silesia, where they were operated for a year until SN83-003 was transferred to Polregio's facility in Podlaskie Voivodeship and SN82-002 to a facility in Pomeranian Voivodeship.

On September 12, SN83-004 was leased by Pomeranian Polregio to operate services in Pomeranian Voivodeship.

In February 2021, two SN82s, numbered 001 and 003, were also delivered to the Polregio's plant in Podlaskie Voivodeship.

On October 6, 2021, Lubusz-based Polregio company leased two SN82s to operate the Gorzów Wielkopolski – Zbąszyń line, on which SA105s were often used. Ultimately, the rental of Wadlopers is expected to improve travel comfort due to the fact that these vehicles are more capacious compared to the younger Tramps, which can carry no more than 50 passengers. On February 7, 2022, the SN83-007 also began service in Lubusz Voivodeship.

=== Argentina / Uruguay ===
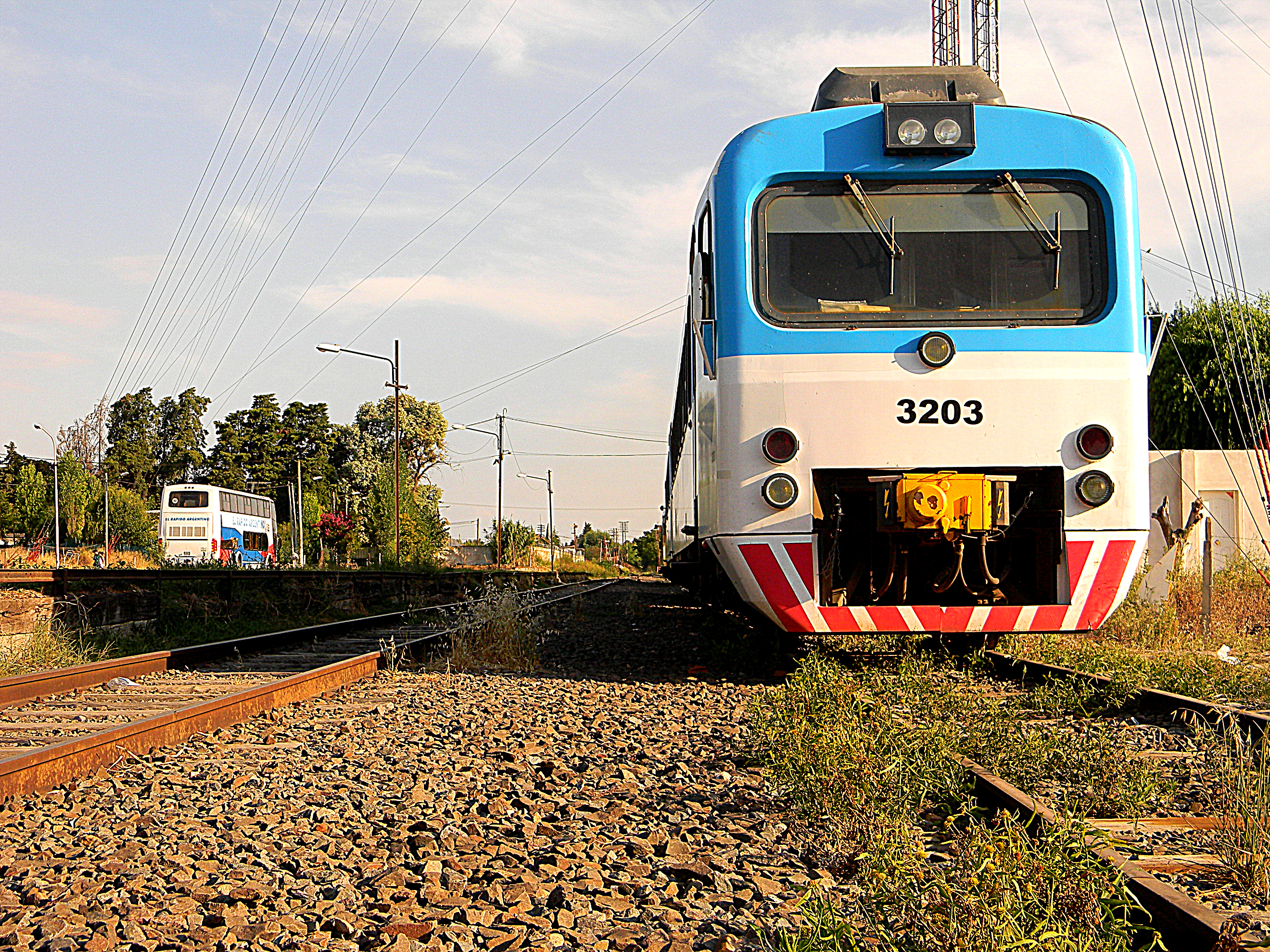
Unit 3203 in the colors of Trenes de Buenos Aires

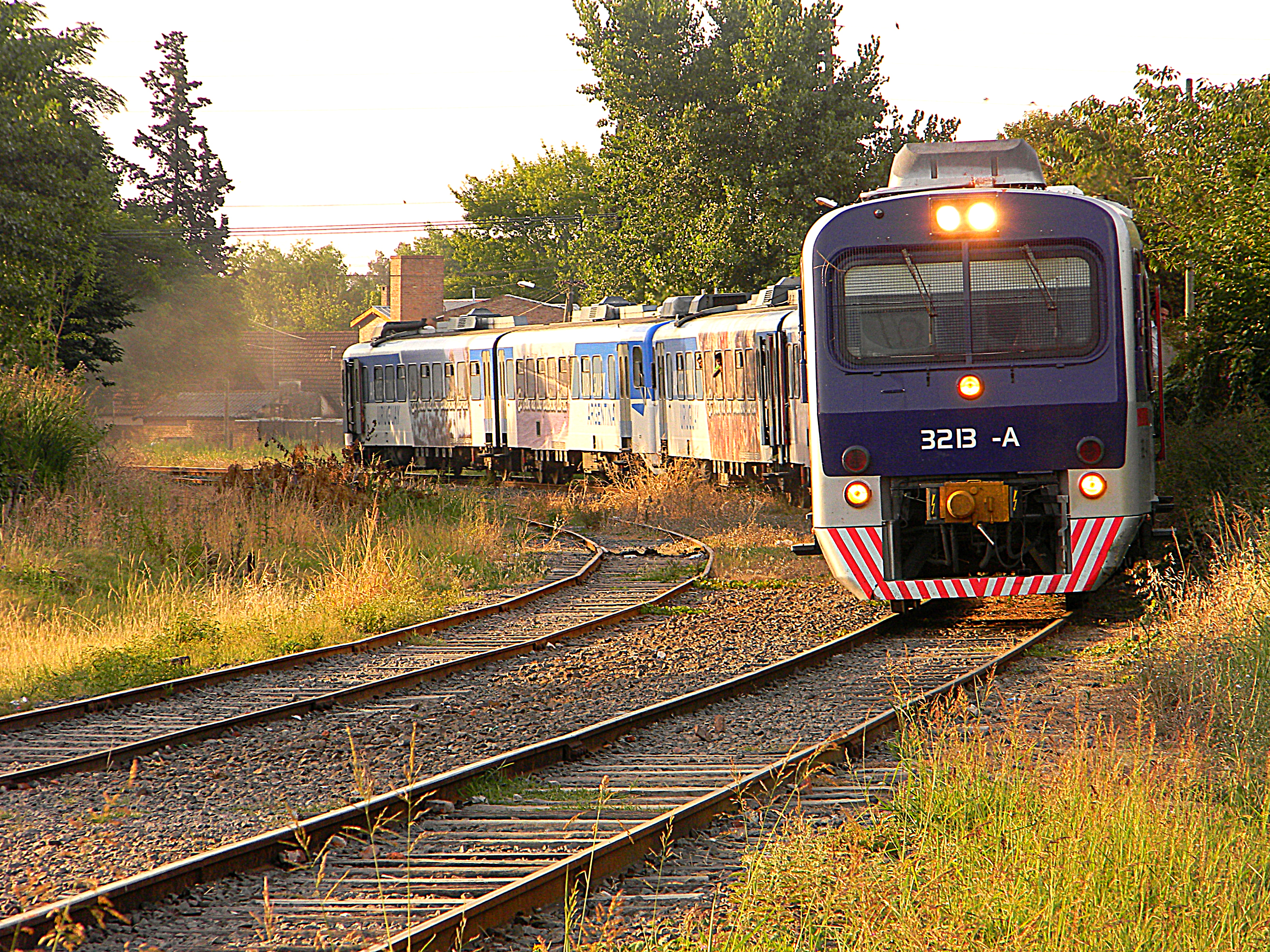
Unit 3213 in the second paint scheme

In mid-2009, when Poland's Sigma Tabor was unable to purchase the original number of Dutch vehicles for financial reasons, the railroads of Argentina and Uruguay also placed an order for them. The trains were transported to South America by sea. On June 11, 2011, 10 two-car DH2 units arrived aboard the Thor Light, with the numbers: 3201, 3203, 3204, 3205, 3209, 3211, 3212, 3213, 3217 and 3221. 15 DH1 cars were also purchased and delivered. The vehicles received white and blue colors similar to the paint scheme of Silesian Railways.

On the last weekend of July, 2011, unit 3203 was transported to the station in Concordia, from where it embarked on a test run to Salto on August 6. The route had been used only for freight traffic for 26 years.

On August 29, 2011, the presidents of the two countries, Cristina Fernández de Kirchner and José Mujica, held a ceremony at the Salto train station to inaugurate a cross-border service called the Train of Free Nations (Spanish: Tren de los Pueblos Libres). On September 9, the train was scheduled to begin service, but eventually a ride for authorities and journalists took place that day. The train left at 8 am from Pilar, and around noon it broke down near Médanos in the southern province of Entre Ríos. The delay caused by the damaged fuel tank was several hours. At 7 pm, the unit arrived in Concordia, where it was scheduled to arrive at 4:30 pm. At 9 pm at the Midland station in Salto, the delay was four hours. The vehicle arrived in Paso de los Toros in the morning of the next day.

Test runs continued in September 2011, the third of which took place on September 20. Train number 3201, with authorities on board, left Pilar at 8 am, arrived in Basavilbaso at 2:40 pm, and continued on to Paso de los Toros 10 minutes later.

On September 23, 2011, at 8:18 am, the first passenger train left on the Pilar – Paso de los Toros line. It brought passengers to Salto which was the first station on the Uruguayan side, and then traveled empty to Paso de los Toros, as the new service at the time had not yet received permission from the Uruguayan Ministry of Transportation for the entire route. On the morning of September 26, the unit set off on its return trip. On September 30, the first run with passengers on the entire route took place.

On October 7, 2011, during the third passenger train ride from Argentina to Uruguay, an accident occurred. At around 6:30 pm, at a rail-road crossing in Concordia, a cab traveling along De los Viñedos Street hit the unit, numbered 3221. The cab driver was driving alone, while 51 people were traveling on the train. No one was hurt and the unit reached the station in Salto, from where it continued its journey after a 20-minute stop.

In the next phase of operation, the line was to connect Buenos Aires and Montevideo, but this ultimately did not happen. With the beginning of November 2011, the route was shortened to Paysandú, and in March 2012 services were again limited to the Pilar – Salto section.

On May 2, 2012, the contract between Argentine carrier Trenes de Buenos Aires and Uruguay's Ministry of Transportation expired. In addition, due to an accident on February 22, 2012, in which 51 people were killed, the operator lost its license, which led to the decision to suspend the route. On May 28, 2012, it was permanently terminated.

In June 2012, five two-car trainsets serving the Train of Free Nations were put away near the station in Pilar. They remained there until the second half of 2014, by which time they were deteriorating, with graffiti painted on them and other acts of vandalism.

On November 8, 2016, the auction of ten DH1 wagons belonging to bankrupt carrier Trenes de Buenos Aires was announced.

=== Argentina / Paraguay ===
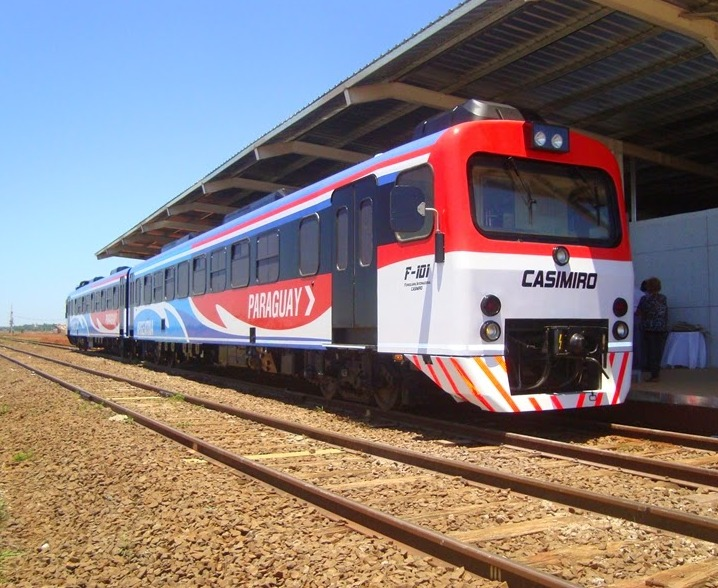
Wadloper during presentation on December 5, 2014, in Posadas

In November 2014, it was announced that a rail route between Argentina's Posadas and Paraguay's Encarnación would be launched. The route was to be operated by private operator Casimiro, which was awarded a concession by the state without a tender. They planned to use the Wadloper units that previously served the Uruguay route, which were then put down in Pilar, for this purpose. The initial plan of operation was for a frequency of 20 minutes.

On November 10, one of the two-unit vehicles of this type made a test run from Basavilbaso to Posadas, while on December 5 it was presented in the carrier's colors at the Posadas station, which was under construction at the time.

The service was originally scheduled to start on December 22, 2014, but the route finally opened on December 31, 2014. Under an agreement between the private company and the state-owned carrier, this route across the San Roque González de Santa Cruz Bridge is operated by Trenes Argentinos with two Casimiro-owned DH2 units. They run daily from 7 am to 7 pm at a frequency of 30 minutes. Scheduled travel time is 8 minutes.

From July 8 to 13, 2015, trains ran around the clock due to increased traffic caused by Pope Francis' visit to Paraguay's capital Asunción.

Between August 20 and September 7, 2015, train service between Argentina and Paraguay was suspended.

=== Romania ===
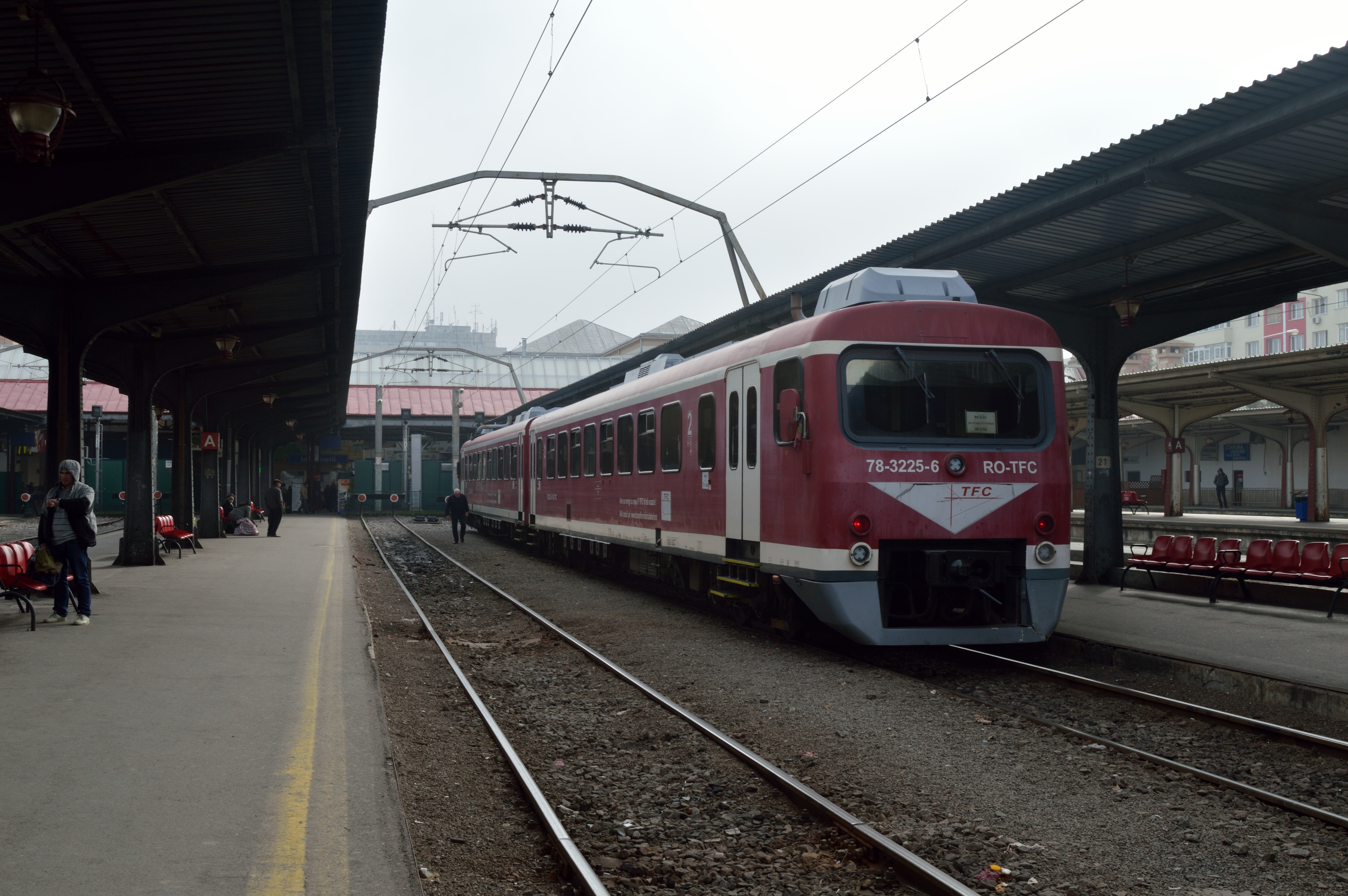
Vehicle 78–3225 at Bucharest station

Romania received 13 DH2-type units, 7 of which were modernized in Cluj. They were given the designation 78-32 and painted brick-red.

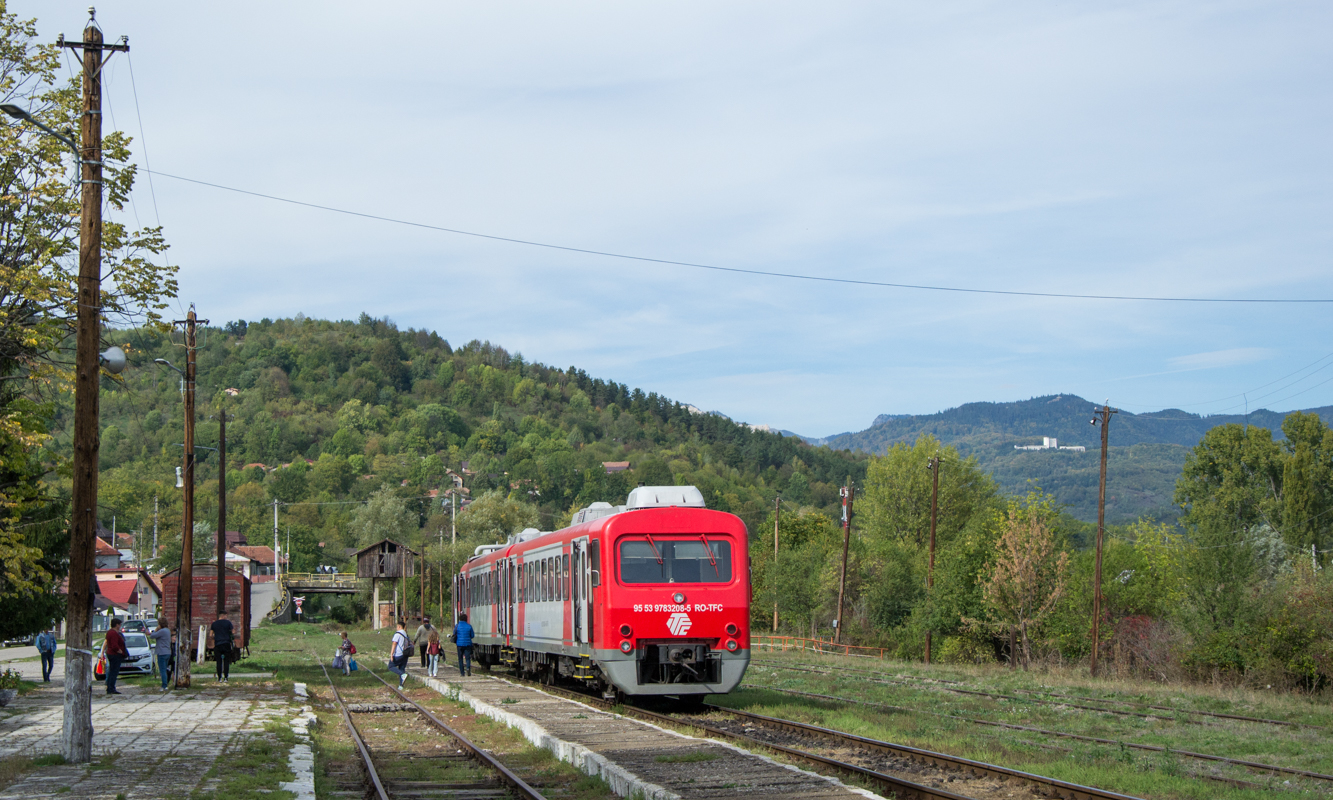
78-3208 with new Transferoviar Călători paint on Pietroșița station

The Wadlopers in Romania are operated by Transferoviar Călători, part of Transferoviar Grup since 2010. Together with the company's other rolling stock, which consists of 76-14 and 76-24 class vehicles, they operate lines:

- Bucharest – Buzău,
- Bucharest – Galați,
- Bucharest – Slănic,
- Buzau – Nehoiașu,
- Cluj – Oradea,
- Galați – Bârlad,
- Ploiești – Slănic,
- Titan (Bucharest) – Oltenița.
