= Slivna (river) =

- Location within Romania

Location
- Country: Romania
- Counties: Galați County
- Villages: Slivna, Băneasa, Moscu

Physical characteristics
- Mouth: Chineja
  - location: Moscu
  - coordinates: 45.9105°N 27.9325°E
- Length: 24 km (15 mi)
- Basin size: 64 km^{2} (25 sq mi)

Basin features
- Progression: Chineja→ Prut→ Danube→ Black Sea
- River code: XIII.1.27.2

The Slivna is a left tributary of the river Chineja in Romania. It flows into the Chineja in Moscu. Its length is 24 km (15 mi) and its basin size is 64 km^{2} (25 sq mi).
