= Băneasa (disambiguation) =

Băneasa may refer to several places in Romania:

- Băneasa, a neighborhood of Bucharest
  - Băneasa Airport
  - Băneasa Forest
  - Zoo Băneasa
- Băneasa, Constanța, a commune in Constanţa County
- Băneasa, Galați, a commune in Galați County
- Băneasa, Giurgiu, a commune in Giurgiu County
- Băneasa, a village in Bozieni Commune, Neamț County
- Băneasa, a village in Salcia Commune, Teleorman County
- Băneasa (river), a tributary of the Chineja in Galați County
- "Băneasă's Green Glade", a song written by Andy Irvine on the 1974 album Cold Blow and the Rainy Night
