= Roșcani =

Roșcani may refer to several places:

In Moldova:

- Roșcani, Anenii Noi, a commune in Anenii Noi district
- Roșcani, Strășeni, a commune in Strășeni district
- Roșcani, a village in Pereni Commune, Rezina district
- Roșcanii de Jos and Roșcanii de Sus, villages in Ghiduleni Commune, Rezina district

In Romania:

- Roșcani, Iași, a commune in Iaşi County
- Roșcani, a village in Băneasa Commune, Galați County
- Roșcani, a village in Dobra Commune, Hunedoara County
- Roșcani, a village administered by Liteni town, Suceava County
- Roșcani (river), a tributary of the Chineja in Galați County

== See also ==
- Rosca (disambiguation)
