= Orășenesc Stadium (Târgu Bujor) =

Romanian stadium

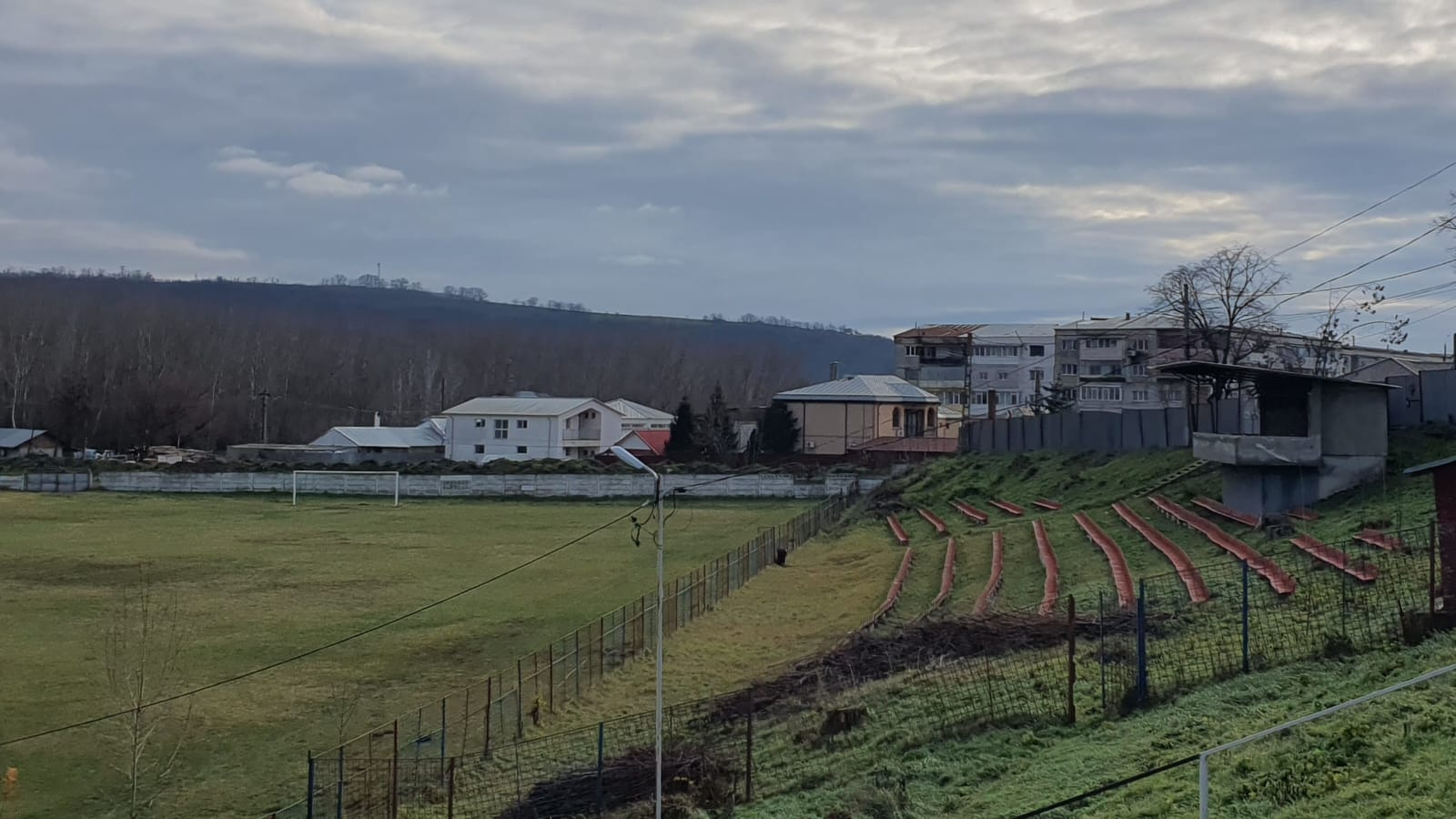
- Interactive map of Orășenesc Stadium
- Former names: Bujorul, Covurluiul
- Address: Str. General Eremia Grigorescu
- Location: Târgu Bujor, Romania
- Coordinates: 45°52′27″N 27°54′47″E
- Owner: Town of Târgu Bujor
- Operator: Covurluiul Târgu Bujor
- Capacity: 1,000 seated
- Surface: Grass

Construction
- Opened: 1960s

Tenant
- Covurluiul Târgu Bujor (1974–Present)

Orășenesc Stadium is a multi-use stadium in Târgu Bujor, Romania. It is the home ground of Covurluiul Târgu Bujor and holds 1,000 people.
