= Chineja =

- Location within Romania

Location
- Country: Romania
- Counties: Galați County
- Towns: Berești, Târgu Bujor

Physical characteristics
- Source: Berești
  - location: Covurlui Plateau
- Mouth: Prut
  - location: Giurgiulești
  - coordinates: 45.4728°N 28.1892°E
- Length: 79 km (49 mi)
- Basin size: 780 km^{2} (300 sq mi)

Basin features
- Progression: Prut→ Danube→ Black Sea

The Chineja is a right tributary of the river Prut in Romania. It flows through the towns and villages Berești, Târgu Bujor, Foltești, Tămăoani, Frumușița, Tulucești and Vânători, and through the Lake Brateș. Its length is 79 km (49 mi) and its basin size is 780 km^{2} (300 sq mi).

== Tributaries ==
The following rivers are tributaries to the river Chineja (from source to mouth):

- Left: Slivna, Mieloea, Radiciu, Roșcani
- Right: Băneasa, Bujorul, Covurlui, Frumușița, Ijdileni
