= Roșcani (river) =

- Location within Romania

Location
- Country: Romania
- Counties: Galați County
- Villages: Roșcani, Măstăcani

Physical characteristics
- Mouth: Chineja
  - location: Măstăcani
  - coordinates: 45.7653°N 28.0426°E
- Length: 27 km (17 mi)
- Basin size: 92 km^{2} (36 sq mi)

Basin features
- Progression: Chineja→ Prut→ Danube→ Black Sea
- River code: XIII.1.27.7

The Roșcani is a left tributary of the river Chineja in Romania. It flows into the Chineja in Măstăcani. Its length is 27 km (17 mi) and its basin size is 92 km^{2} (36 sq mi).
