= Zărnești (disambiguation) =

Zărneşti may refer to several places in Romania:

- Zărnești, a town in Braşov County
- Zărnești, a commune in Buzău County
- Zărnești, a village in Mălureni Commune, Argeș County
- Zărnești, a village in Jorăști Commune, Galați County
- Zărnești, a village in Lăpușata Commune, Vâlcea County

and to:

- Zîrneşti, a commune in Cahul district, Moldova
