= Ijdileni =

- Location within Romania

Location
- Country: Romania
- Counties: Galați County
- Villages: Scânteiești, Ijdileni

Physical characteristics
- Mouth: Chineja
  - coordinates: 45.6329°N 28.0625°E
- Length: 20 km (12 mi)
- Basin size: 92 km^{2} (36 sq mi)

Basin features
- Progression: Chineja→ Prut→ Danube→ Black Sea
- River code: XIII.1.27.9

The Ijdileni is a right tributary of the river Chineja in Romania. It flows into the Chineja in the village Ijdileni. Its length is 20 km (12 mi) and its basin size is 92 km^{2} (36 sq mi).
