= Transferoviar Călători =

Romanian railway operator

Transferoviar Călători (TFC)
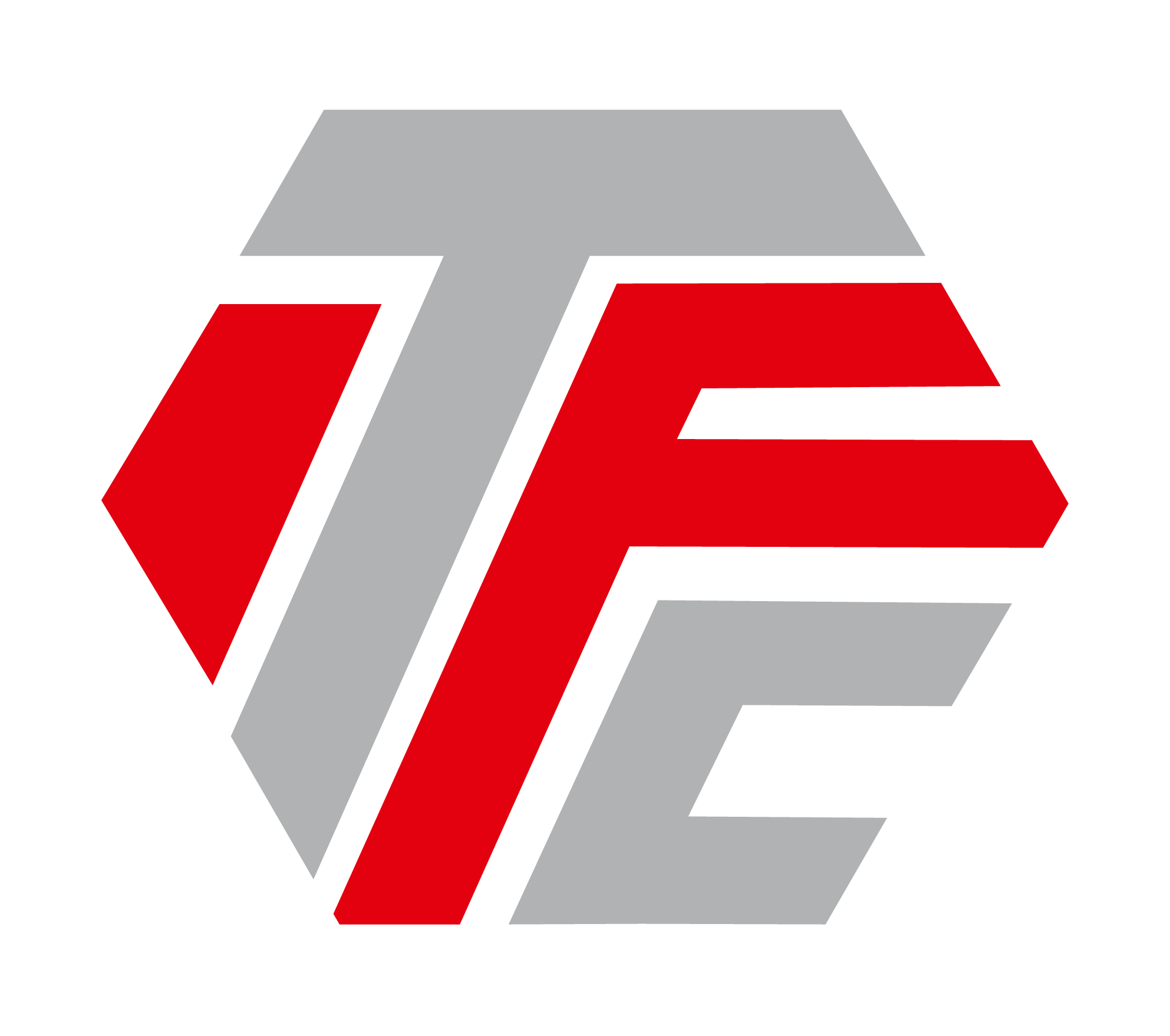

Overview
- Main region: Romania
- Fleet: 60
- Parent company: Transferoviar Grup
- Headquarters: Bucharest, Cluj-Napoca
- Reporting mark: RO-TFC, D-TFC, NL-TFC
- Dates of operation: 24 February 2010–present

Technical
- Track gauge: 1435 mm
- Electrification: No

Other
- Website: transferoviarcalatori.ro

Transferoviar Călători (TFC), a subsidiary of Transferoviar Grup, is a private railway operator from Romania that has as its main activity the public passenger transportation that is assured on 7 non-interoperable lines as well as on interoperable (public administration) infrastructure. These routes are served with short to medium haul light rolling stock, diesel multiple units consisting of two or three carriages. Units can be coupled together to cope with rush hour services.

The company was founded on 24 February 2010, being located at first in Bucharest and since 25 June 2012, its social headquarters has been moved to the city of Cluj-Napoca, although operational HQs still remain in the capital city.

== Routes ==
- Mainline services (open access on CFR network)
  - Bucharest North - Ploiești Sud - Buzău - Galați
  - Bucharest North - Târgoviște
  - Cluj-Napoca - Aghireș - Oradea
  - Cluj-Napoca - Bonțida
  - Cluj-Napoca - Brașov
  - Bucharest North - Fetești
  - Bucharest North - Roșiorii de Vede
  - Bucharest North - Brașov
  - Bucharest North - Constanța - Mangalia (seasonal)
  - Buzău - Constanța - Mangalia (seasonal)
  - Galati - Braila - Constanta
- Regional & leased-line services
  - Titan Sud - Oltenița
  - Galați - Târgu Bujor - Bârlad
  - Buzău - Nehoiașu
  - Slănic - Ploiești Sud
  - Ploiești Sud - Măneciu
  - Ploiești Sud - Târgoviște
  - Târgoviște - Pietroșița

== Rolling stock ==
Diesel Multiple Units
Type	No. of carriages.	Amount of active vehicles	Country of origin	Image	Top speed	Air conditioning
DH2 (Wadloper)	2	13	Netherlands (NS)		100 km/h	Cab only
VT624	3	6	Germany (DB)		100 km/h	No
VT614	3	8	Germany (DB)		120 km/h	No
ADH11	3	3	Romania (Rebuilt at Remarul 16 Februarie from older VT614 cars)		120 km/h	Yes
VT643.2 (Bombardier Talent)	2	12	Germany (Regiobahn Mettmann)		100 km/h	Yes
VT648.2 (Alstom Coradia LINT41)	2	3	Germany (Abellio NRW)		120 km/h	Yes
VT644 (Bombardier Talent)	3	6	Germany (DB Regio)		120 Km/h	Yes
VT648.2 (Alstom Coradia LINT41H)	2	9	Netherlands (Keolis)		120 Km/h	Yes
