= Rosca (disambiguation) =

Rosca or Roșca may refer to:

- Rosca, a Spanish bread dish
- Rosca de reyes, a Hispanic king cake
- Rotating Savings and Credit Association, a type of organization
- Roșca, a Romanian surname
- Madeleine Rosca, Australian artist
- Monika Rosca, Polish pianist and actress
- Ninotchka Rosca, Filipina author
- Roscas (Filipino cuisine), a Filipino cookie
- Restore Online Shoppers' Confidence Act, a 2010 United States consumer protection law

== See also ==
- Roșcani (disambiguation)
