= Iulian-Gabriel Bîrsan =

Romanian engineer and politician (1956–2022)

Member of the Chamber of Deputies of Romania
- In office 1 September 2004 – 13 December 2004
- Preceded by: Mircea-Nicu Toader
- Constituency: Galați County

Personal details
- Born: 29 October 1956 Târgu Bujor, Romania
- Died: 27 August 2022 (aged 65)
- Party: PD
- Occupation: Engineer

Iulian-Gabriel Bîrsan (29 October 1956 – 27 August 2022) was a Romanian engineer and politician. A member of the Democratic Party, he served in the Chamber of Deputies from September to December 2004.

Bîrsan died on 27 August 2022, at the age of 65.

== Professional activity ==
Bîrsan was a university professor at the Cross-Border Faculty of Humanities, Economics and Engineering within the Dunărea de Jos University of Galați and a doctoral supervisor in the field of Mechanical engineering at the same university. He was elected rector on 20 February 2012.

Bîrsan was validated as a deputy for the Democratic Party (PD) on 1 September 2004, replacing deputy Mircea-Nicu Toader. During the 2004–2008 legislature, he was elected as a deputy for Galați County on the PD lists, which later became the Democratic Liberal Party. As part of his parliamentary activity, Bîrsan was a member of the parliamentary friendship groups with the Republic of Korea, the Republic of Latvia, and the Republic of Finland. According to his official biography, Iulian-Gabriel Bîrsan was a member of the PCR between 1978 and 1989.
