= Bujorul =

- Location within Romania

Location
- Country: Romania
- Counties: Galați County
- Villages: Zărnești, Jorăști, Târgu Bujor

Physical characteristics
- Mouth: Chineja
  - location: Târgu Bujor
  - coordinates: 45.8594°N 27.9184°E
- Length: 30 km (19 mi)
- Basin size: 93 km^{2} (36 sq mi)

Basin features
- Progression: Chineja→ Prut→ Danube→ Black Sea
- River code: XIII.1.27.3

The Bujorul is a right tributary of the river Chineja in Romania. It flows into the Chineja in the town Târgu Bujor. Its length is 30 km (19 mi) and its basin size is 93 km^{2} (36 sq mi).
