= Transferoviar Grup =

Romanian private railway company

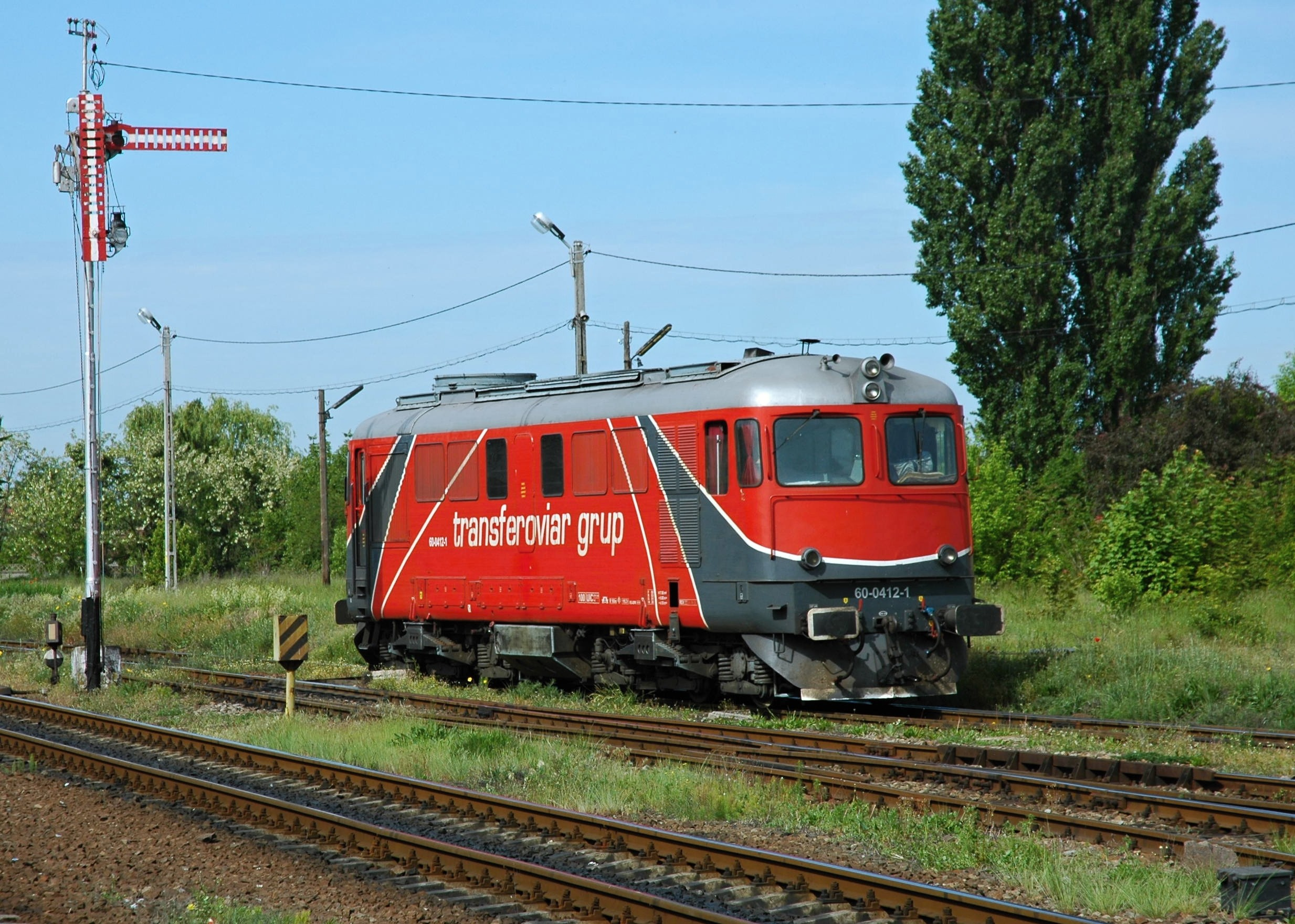
Class 060DA locomotive of Transferoviar Grup

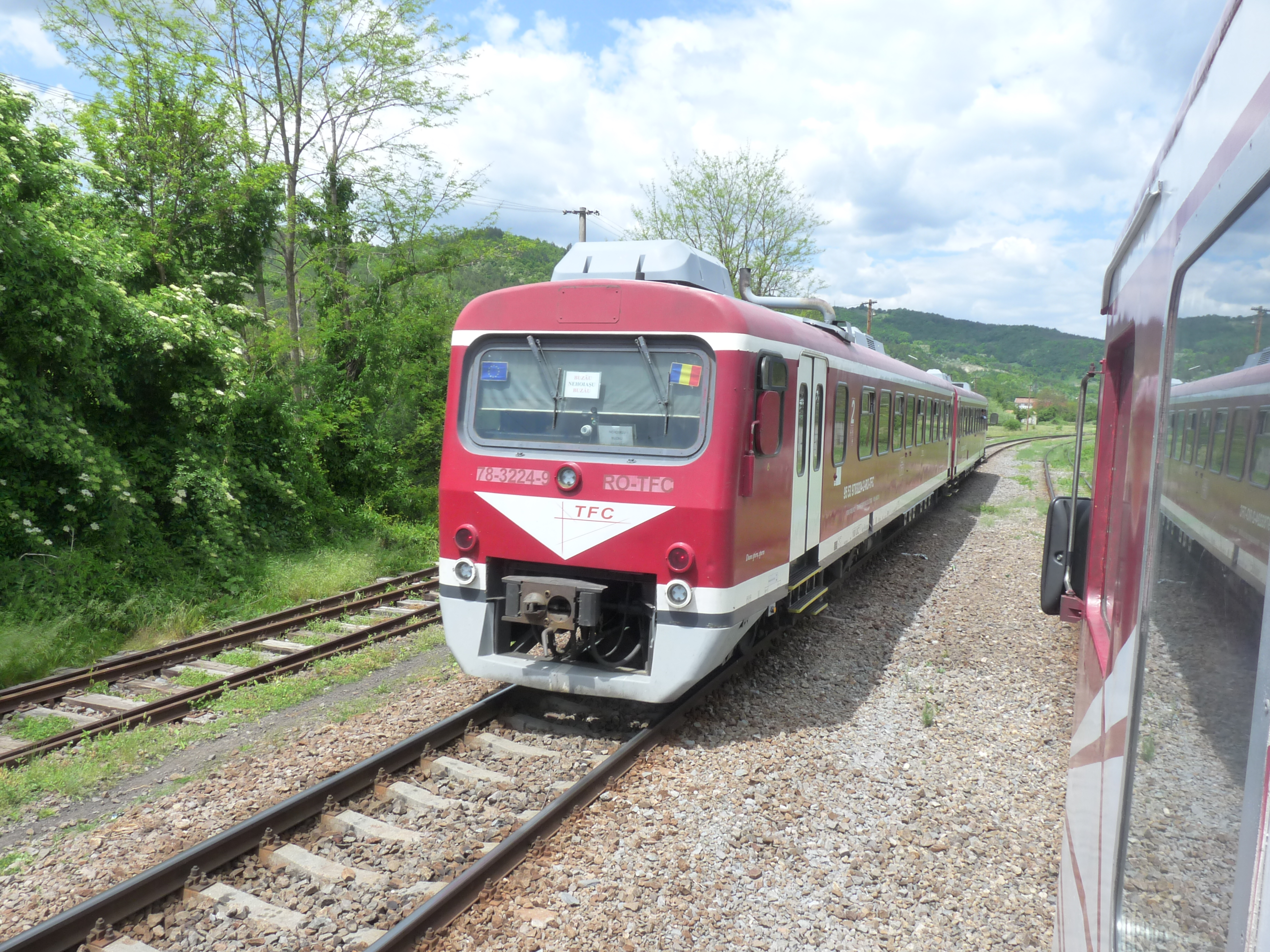
Wadloper/DH2 type DMU, Pătârlagele

Transferoviar Grup (TFG) is a private railway company in Romania, founded in 2003. Initially the company only operated freight trains but in 2010 it also started passenger services.

Besides freight hauling, it is the administrator of a few leased secondary lines, of which most are operated with passenger trains by its wholly owned subsidiary:

- Bucharest-Oltenița
- Buzău-Nehoiaşu
- Galați-Târgu Bujor-Bârlad
- Buda–Slănic
- Costești – Roșiori

== Passenger transportation ==
Passenger trains are run by TFG's subsidiary Transferoviar Călători using mainly former DB Class VT 24, VT 614, ex-NS DH2 and Bombardier Talent class 1000 Diesel multiple units.

It also operates several trains on the Bucharest-Buzău, Buzău-Galați and Cluj-Napoca mainlines.
