= SŽ series 711 =

SŽ class 711
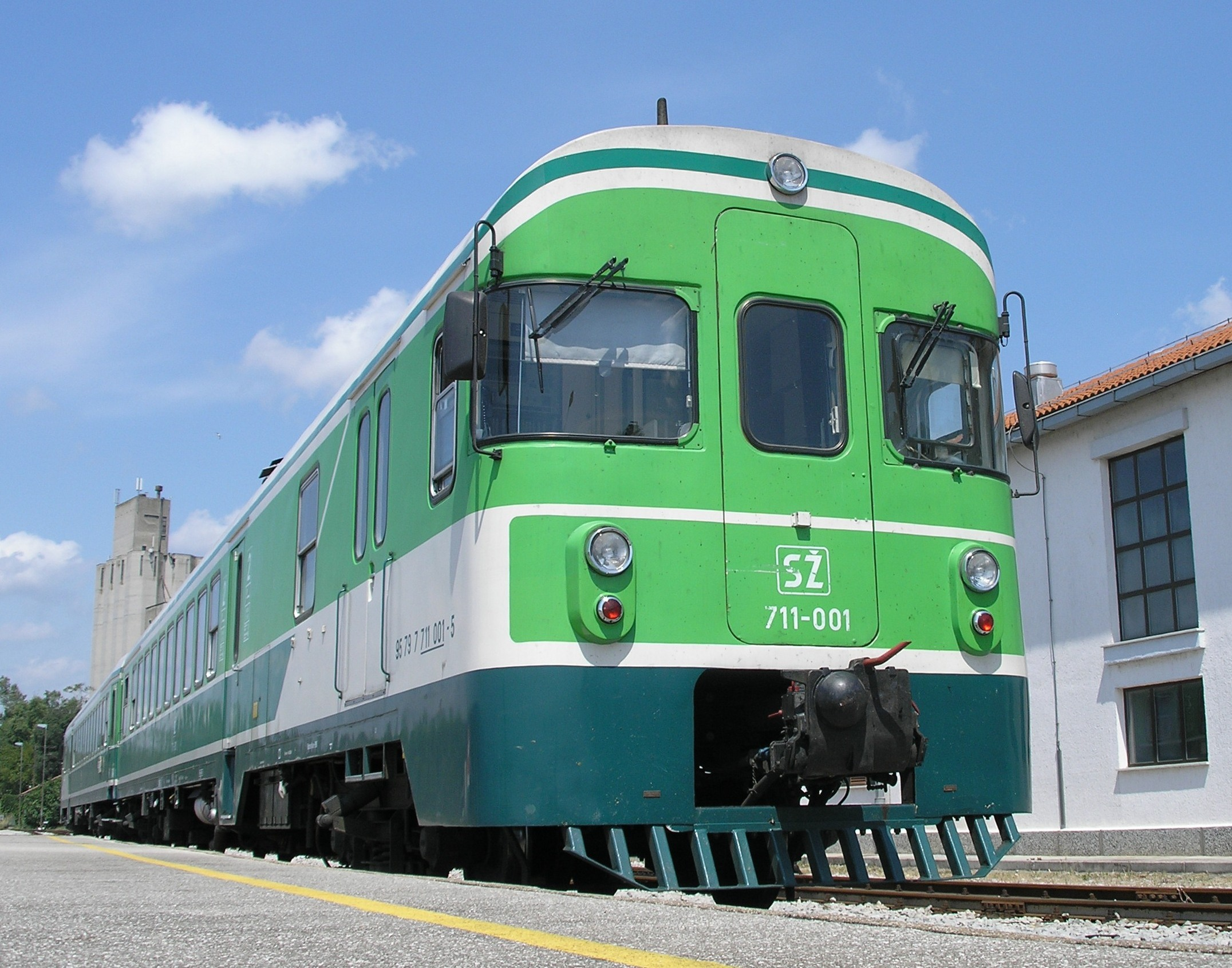
- Slovenian Railways 711-01/02 unit
Type and origin
- Power type: Diesel-hydraulic
- Builder: MBB Donauwörth
- Build date: 1970
Specifications
- Configuration
  - UIC: 2'B' + B'2'
- Gauge: 1,435 mm (4 ft 8 1/2 in) standard gauge
- Length: 28.5 m (93 ft 6 in)
- Loco weight: 89 tonnes (88 long tons; 98 short tons)
Performance figures
- Maximum speed: 120 km/h (75 mph)
- Power output: 530 kW (710 hp)
Career
- Nicknames: "green train"
- Locale: Slovenia

SŽ class 711 is a diesel multiple unit, produced by MBB Donauwörth in 1970 and currently operating in the Slovenian Railways (Slovene: Slovenske železnice, SŽ). The technical design is based on Germany's Deutsche Bahn class 624.
