= Băneasa (river) =

- Location within Romania

Location
- Country: Romania
- Counties: Galați County
- Villages: Băneasa

Physical characteristics
- Mouth: Chineja
  - location: Băneasa
  - coordinates: 45.9435°N 27.9370°E
- Length: 17 km (11 mi)
- Basin size: 27 km^{2} (10 sq mi)

Basin features
- Progression: Chineja→ Prut→ Danube→ Black Sea
- River code: XIII.1.27.1

The Băneasa is a right tributary of the river Chineja in Romania. It flows into the Chineja in the village Băneasa. Its length is 17 km (11 mi) and its basin size is 27 km^{2} (10 sq mi).
