= Covurlui =

Plain in Galați County, Romania

The Covurlui Plain is a plain located in Galați County, Romania, having an altitude varying between 60 and 200 metres. Its name is derived from the river Covurlui and has a Cuman origin. Before World War II, Covurlui was the name of a county, but it was merged with Tecuci County to form the current Galați County.
