= Covurlui (river) =

- Location within Romania

Location
- Country: Romania
- Counties: Galați County
- Villages: Rădești, Vârlezi, Viile

Physical characteristics
- Mouth: Chineja
  - coordinates: 45.8098°N 27.9515°E
- Length: 32 km (20 mi)
- Basin size: 115 km^{2} (44 sq mi)

Basin features
- Progression: Chineja→ Prut→ Danube→ Black Sea
- River code: XIII.1.27.4

The Covurlui is a right tributary of the river Chineja in Romania. It flows into the Chineja in Viile. Its length is 32 km (20 mi) and its basin size is 115 km^{2} (44 sq mi).
