= Fârțănești =

- Commune
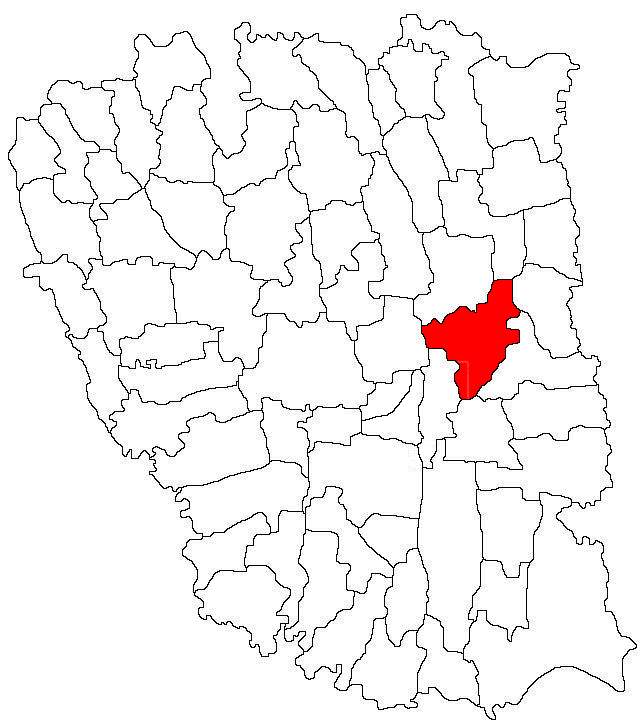
- Location in Galați County

- Location in Romania
- Coordinates: 45°49′N 27°59′E
- Country: Romania
- County: Galați
- Population (2021-12-01): 4,911
- Time zone: EET/EEST (UTC+2/+3)
- Vehicle reg.: GL

Fârțănești is a commune in Galați County, Western Moldavia, Romania with a population of 5,283 people. It is composed of two villages, Fârțănești and Viile.
