= Frumosu (disambiguation) =

Frumosu may refer to the following places in Romania:

- Frumosu, a commune in Suceava County
- Frumosu, a village in the commune Farcașa, Neamț County
- Frumosu, a tributary of the river Motru in Gorj County
- Frumosu River (Moldovița)
