= DB Class 614 =

DB Class 614/914
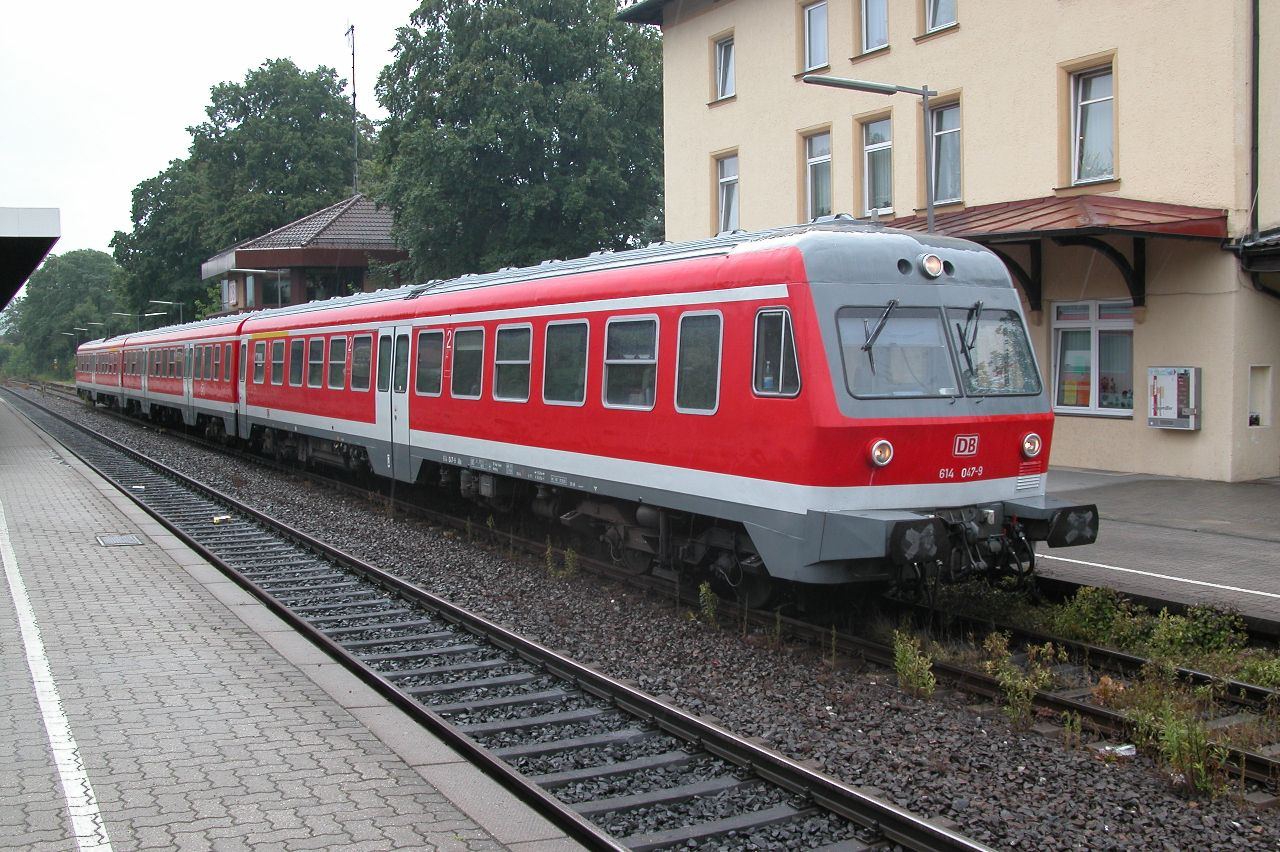
- Three-car 614+914+614 in Hersbruck, 28 July 2006
- Manufacturer: MAN; Uerdingen
- Constructed: Prototypes: 1971; Series production: 1972–1975
- Number built: 84 driving motor cars (614); 42 centre trailer cars (914)
- Fleet numbers: 614 001/002–083/084; 914 001–042

Specifications
- Train length: 3-car: 79,460 mm (260 ft 8 1/4 in)
- Maximum speed: 140 km/h (87 mph)
- Weight: 3-car: 141.8 tonnes (139.6 long tons; 156.3 short tons)
- Prime mover(s): MAN
- Engine type: Diesel
- Power output: 754 kW (1,025 PS; 1,011 hp)
- Transmission: Hydraulic
- UIC classification: 3-car: B′2′+2′2′+2′B′
- Braking system(s): KE-R-A
- Safety system(s): Sifa / PZB

The DB Class 614s are German diesel multiple units operated by the Deutsche Bundesbahn, comprising two Class 614 driving units and up to two Class 914 centre cars. On 1 January 1994 the ownership of these vehicles was transferred to the DB's legal successor Deutsche Bahn and its subsidiaries or business areas.

The Class 614 is a direct evolution of the Class 624 / 634 and only differs from them in a few points of detail. As a result, the technical section will only cover these differences.

== History ==
=== Prototypes ===
In 1971 the prototypes, 614 001 + 914 001 + 614 002 and 614 003 + 914 002 + 614 004, were delivered. Testing was carried out from Trier along the Moselle valley and into the Eifel. Unlike the production vehicles the prototypes had a tilting systems.

=== Production units ===
Full production by MAN SE and the Uerdingen Waggonfabrik began in 1973. The first series of 25 three-coach units was delivered at the time when so-called "pop liveries" were in vogue and so they were painted in stone-grey and orange. Immediately following the first batch were the 15 units of the second series delivered in 1975 and stabled at Brunswick locomotive depot. These were already painted in the new ocean blue and beige livery.

=== Operations ===
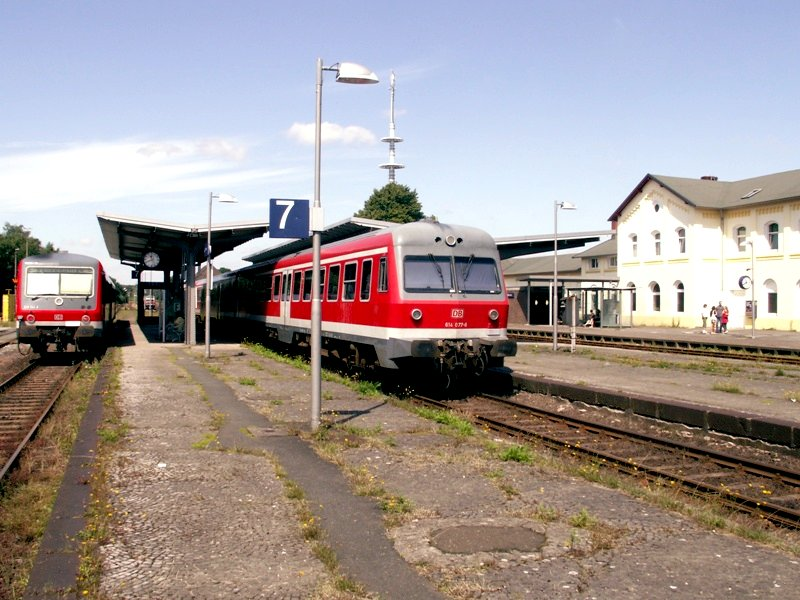
614 at Soltau station

There are a total of 42 Class 614 three-car units, which are stationed at Nuremberg and Brunswick. In the early years, Trier was also a base for these DMUs. The Brunswick 614's have mainly worked in the Harz and Weser Uplands since their introduction. In doing so they often ran on former East-West trunk lines, which lost their significance after the partition of Germany. The most important termini were Altenbeken, Bad Harzburg, Bad Lauterberg, Bielefeld, Brunswick, Bodenburg, Göttingen, Hamelin, Hildesheim, Kreiensen, Löhne, Northeim, Ottbergen, Paderborn, Salzgitter-Lebenstedt, and Walkenried. During some timetable periods they also called at Lemgo, Münster, Nordhausen, Osnabrück, Oldenburg, Rahden, Uelzen and Wilhelmshaven. Currently the units all operate in the standard configuration as three-car multiples, whereas in former years they were frequently run as just two-car units or sometimes in fours. Quite often they formed part of mixed multiples, for example: 614+914+934+634. Meanwhile, following the transfer of numerous lines to private firms as a result of competition, and the delivery of the Class 648.25 to DB Regio, the Brunswick DMUs have largely withdrawn from these classic routes. Instead they have been used on atypical routes, like e.g. Leer - Nieuweschans, Emden Hbf - Emden-Außenhafen, Minden - Rotenburg, Uelzen - Bremen and Hanover – Soltau - Buchholz, although currently only the last two routes are still worked by them. The Brunswick Class 628's freed up from other locations were expected to replace the remaining 614's during 2008. Several vehicles have already been set aside and scrapped, several were moved to Hamm Rbf and are hoping for a better future there.

The Nuremberg 614's are underway in the Upper Palatinate (Oberpfalz) and in Franconia (Franken), working such routes as Forchheim–Ebermannstadt, Fürth–Cadolzburg, Fürth–Markt Erlbach and Nuremberg–Simmelsdorf-Hüttenbach/Neuhaus an der Pegnitz. Here too only three-coach trains are used, whilst previously several 934's were stationed at Nuremberg in order to be able to form four-car multiples. These formations were not liked by drivers because the lack of engine power on the 614 was only too obvious on inclines. The use of the Nuremberg VT 614's is coming to an end, because in December 2008 new VT 648s were to be used on most of the routes in the Nuremberg diesel network.

A number of class 614 units have been sold on to CFR in Romania, where they form CFR Class 76.They have been also sold to Transferoviar Grup. Some have been partially rebuilt by Remarul 16 Februarie with new driver's cabs and MTU powerplants. A few have also been sold to SKPL of Poland, where they are reclassified as SN84.

== Differences from 624/634 ==
Even though their external appearance is somewhat different, the variations between Classes 614 and 624 are not that great. The following sections describe their main differences; in all other respects the classes are the same.

=== Running gear ===
The bogies were slightly changed. They are supported, as on the 634's, by air bags, but are controlled by 4 air suspension valves on each coach (apart from 614 001 to 004). The resulting four-point support changes over to a three-point support at speeds below 25 km/h using a pressure control on the wheelset bearing, which deactivates one of the valves.

Instead of the mechanical anti-skid system on the 624/634 the Class 614 has electronic anti-skid control.

=== Engine ===
The D 3650 HM 12 U diesel engine from MAN is largely the same as that on the 624/634, but is driven at a higher final speed of 2150 rpm and is rated at 370 kW/500 hp, but only set at 331 kW/450 hp (as is normal on the 624/634). The handpump fitted to many 624/634's for topping up the cooling water is not installed on the 614. The fan equipment for the coolant water system can be set to emergency operation by the driver should the fan valve fail, something which can only be done in a workshop on the 624/634.

26 coaches (13 sets) have been equipped with new Cummins diesel engines in recent years. These engines have the considerably higher power of 448 kW. However, this remotoring programme was stopped when the operational future of the Class 614 became markedly bleaker.

=== Heating ===
On modernisation all 614's, and even the 914 centre coaches, were given a timer that enables the time to be set for coaches to be preheated. In this way their preparation time can be shortened. At the same time standard thermostat valves from trade were installed in the 1st class compartments.

=== Door operation ===
The Class 614 has door control with selective door opening and door sensory systems. The doors, which on the 624/634 were not always easy to open, are assisted by compressed air. As part of modernisation in the mid-90s a warning tone device was retrofitted and - unlike the 624 - also an anti-jam system. Some of the vehicles also have warning lights in the area of the door. Shortly after the turn of the millennium several 614's were converted to TAV (technikbasierte Abfertigungsverfahren) automatic door operation. Door control computers were installed, door handles removed and replaced by door opening buttons and photoelectric beams. Because the new door control system was not very reliable and the vehicles were approaching the end of their service life the TAV installation programme was halted after a few years, even before the end of the remotoring programme.

=== Passenger information systems ===
Until their modernisation the 614's had the destination blinds familiar from the 624/634 series. These were later replaced by two electronic dot matrix displays on each VT coach. The control of all displays in the train was achieved by entering the destination code number into Brose entry devices that are installed on every driver's console. In addition several Nuremberg 614's were given early passenger information displays.

=== Passenger areas ===
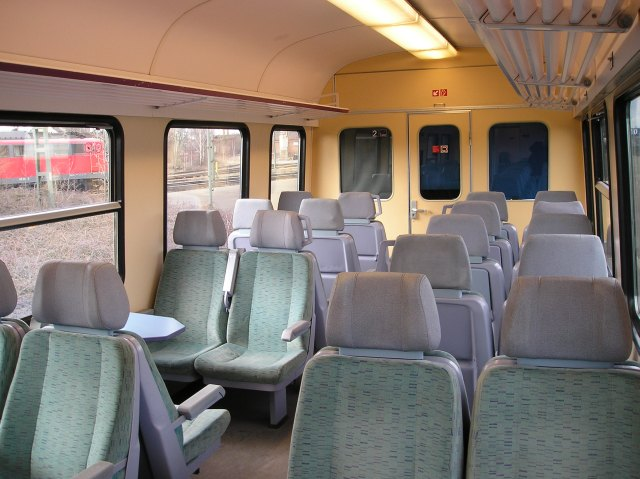
Interior of 614 002 after modernisation (31 March 2006)

The interior of the Class 614 always set it apart clearly from its older brethren. On delivery the coaches had adjustable seats with individual, fabric-covered cushions. The colour of the seat covers as well as the imitation leather arms and headrests varied, being either red-brown or green. The sides were screened with beige plastic. The 1st class compartment was largely the same as that on the 624/634. And whilst the interiors looked very smart, the colours were very much contemporary and were no longer up to date by the mid-1990s.

During the course of the modernisation programme the 614's were given the first double-decker coaches delivered to the old Federal states and the y-coaches of well-known design with beige wall coverings and light green fabric-covered individual seats, some arranged facing each other, others all facing in the same direction. One unique feature is the folding table at every seat, some of which are now missing as a result of vandalism. As on the 624/634 the luggage compartment behind the cab, together with its loading doors, was omitted. The 1st class compartments were given pink wall coverings, blue tables and blue, adjustable individual seats with red head cushions.

The last 914's to be modernised were each given two closed vacuum toilet systems, of which one is fitted for the disable. Later the remaining 914's were retrofitted with them.

=== Livery ===
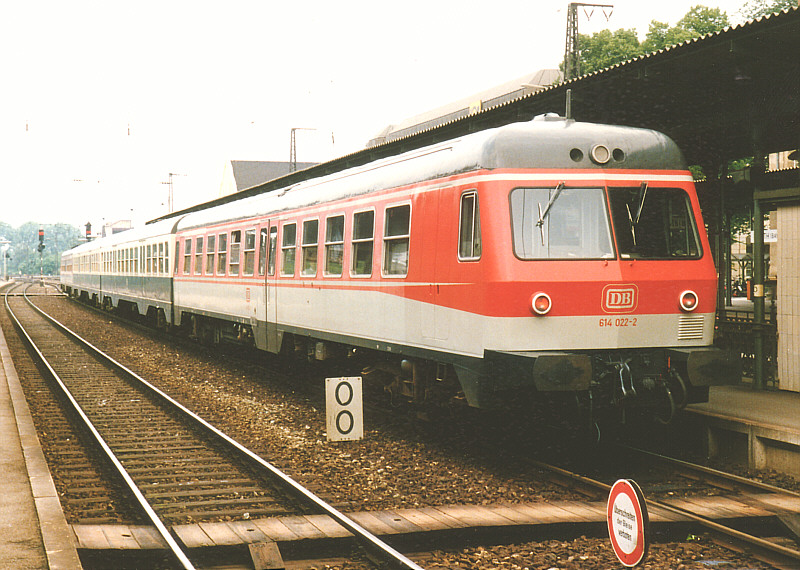
614 + 934 + 934 + 614 Fürth (Bay) Hbf, June 1987

The first series to be delivered, which went to Nuremberg depot, were painted in the contemporary 'pop' colour scheme. This was later changed on the 614 to a blood orange window stripe on a gravel grey background. This livery was retained until the coaches were modernised. The second series, delivered to Brunswick depot, was supplied in ocean-blue and beige. Unlike the 624/634 the 614 was given an additional thin blue decorative stripe above the line dividing the colours which lent the vehicles a more dynamic appearance. Almost all 614s were initially painted light grey and mint green for the redesign and, later on, traffic red and white. The only exception is unit 614 005 + 914 003 + 614 006 which was painted in gravel grey and orange on modernisation and preserved the 'pop' colour scheme into the new millennium. All other vehicles have since been repainted in the current scheme of traffic red and white.

== Citations ==
- Garvin, Brian (2013). German Railways: The Complete Guide to All Locomotives and Multiple Units of Deutsche Bahn – Part 1: Locomotives & Multiple Units of Deutsche Bahn (5 ed.). Sheffield, UK: Platform 5 Publishing. ISBN 978-1-9094-3103-4.
