= Măstăcani =

- Commune
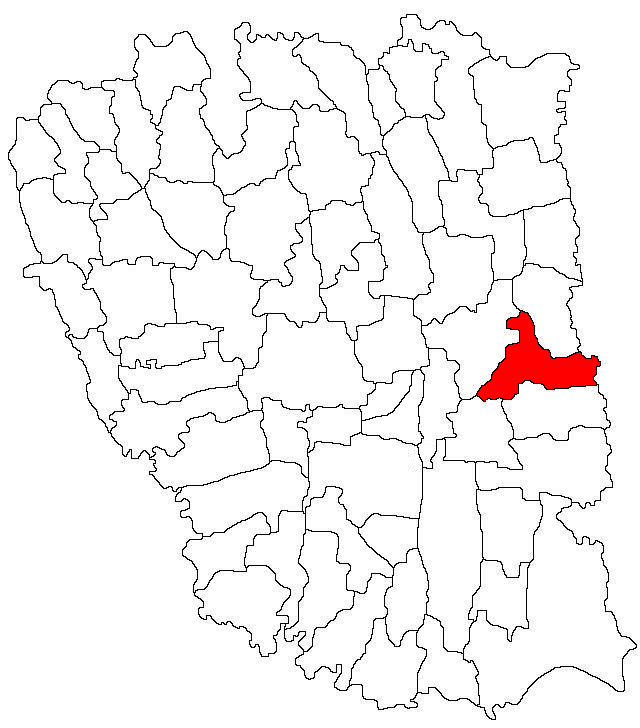
- Location in Galați County

- Location in Romania
- Coordinates: 45°47′N 28°2′E
- Country: Romania
- County: Galați
- Population (2021-12-01): 3,783
- Time zone: EET/EEST (UTC+2/+3)
- Vehicle reg.: GL

Măstăcani is a commune in Galați County, Western Moldavia, Romania with a population of 5,144 people. It is composed of two villages, Chiraftei and Măstăcani.
