= Jorăști =

- Commune
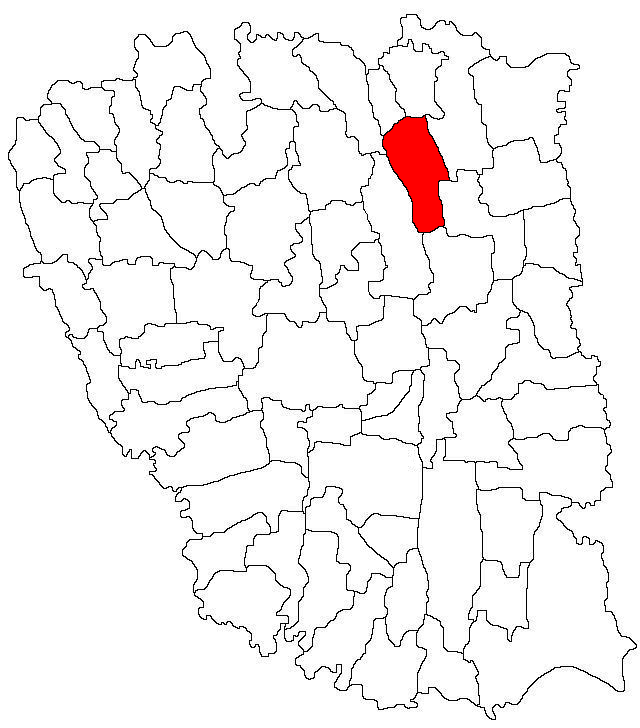
- Location in Galați County

- Location in Romania
- Coordinates: 45°59′N 27°52′E
- Country: Romania
- County: Galați

Government
  - Mayor (2020–2024): Dănuț Tofan (PSD)
- Area: 68.12 km^{2} (26.30 sq mi)
- Elevation: 105 m (344 ft)
- Population (2021-12-01): 1,616
  - Density: 24/km^{2} (61/sq mi)
- Time zone: EET/EEST (UTC+2/+3)
- Postal code: 807175
- Area code: +(40) 236
- Vehicle reg.: GL
- Website: www.primariajorasti.ro

Jorăști is a commune in Galați County, Western Moldavia, Romania with a population of 1,616 people as of 2021. It is composed of three villages: Lunca, Jorăști, and Zărnești.

The commune is situated in the southern part of the Moldavian Plateau, at an altitude of 105 m (344 ft), on the banks of the Bujorul stream. It is located in the northeastern part of Galați County, on county road DJ242H, about 70 km (43 mi) north of the county seat, Galați.

Historical population
Year	Pop.	±%
2002	1,945	—
2011	1,779	−8.5%
2021	1,616	−9.2%
Source: Census data

== Natives ==
- Sorin Frunză (born 1978), footballer
- Ioan Gheorghe Savin (1885–1973), theologian, academic, and writer
