= DB Class VT 24 =

DB class 624 / 634
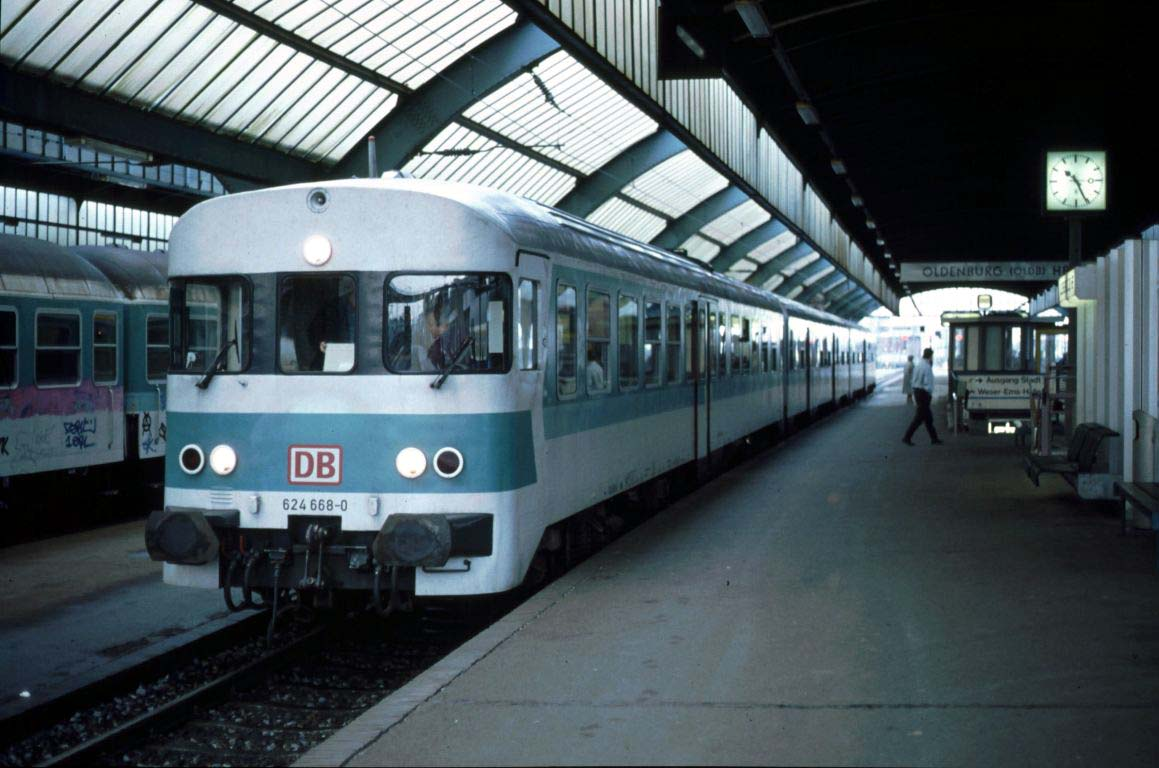
- A class 624 at Oldenburg main station
Type and origin
- Power type: Diesel-hydraulic
- Builder: MAN AG, Waggonfabrik Uerdingen
- Build date: 1961 (prototypes); 1964-1968 (regular)
Specifications
- Configuration
  - UIC: B'2' + 2'2' + 2'B' (standard configuration)
- Gauge: 1,435 mm (4 ft 8 1/2 in)
- Axle load: 12 t (12 long tons; 13 short tons)
- Prime mover: MAN
- Engine type: Diesel engine
Performance figures
- Maximum speed: 120 km/h (75 mph) (class 624); 140 km/h (87 mph) (class 634)
- Power output: 2x 331 kW (450 PS; 444 hp)
Career
- Operators: Deutsche Bahn, PKP, Transferoviar Calatori
- Locale: Germany; Poland Romania
- Retired: 2005

Class 624 and class 634 are types of diesel multiple unit, originally operated by Deutsche Bahn.

== Development ==
Whereas during the first years after World War II the focus of the Deutsche Bundesbahn was on repairs of rolling stock, lines and buildings, with the beginning of the 1950s attention shifted to renewal of the trains. For passenger services on not electrified lines, the first prototypes of main line diesel locomotives such as the class 220 were commissioned in 1953. Subsequently, DB ordered the rail industry to develop new DMUs in order to replace pre-war classes and steam traction.

In 1961 MAN and Waggonfabrik Uerdingen both delivered two prototypes each. Even though they were quite similar, they can be distinguished easily by the different front design. DB put the prototypes into service as class VT 23.5 (MAN) and class VT 24.5 (Uerdingen). After the new numbering scheme the prototypes were listed as class 624 together with the regular units. The prototypes underwent intensive tests, including comparison to conventional push/pull trains with DB Class V 100.

The regular trainsets were delivered from 1964 to 1968 and were produced jointly by both manufacturers. Only minor changes were made to the prototype design. A total of 80 front cars and 55 middle cars were delivered, allowing the use of 40 three-part or four-part trainsets. Starting in 1968, a number of units were equipped with pneumatic shock absorption and passive tilting systems. These units were listed as class 634 and approved for a higher speed of 140 km/h. As the tilting system turned out to be of limited use, clearance allowing only very limited tilting, in 1979 the tilting system was removed.

In 1970 a number of trainsets derived from class 624 were delivered to Yugoslavia (Slovenia) as SŽ series 711. They are still in use by Slovenian Railways.

== Service ==
Upon entering service the new class 624 units were often used for fast regional and express trains in various parts of Germany. This changed gradually and by 1980 nearly all of the units were based in Osnabrück and Braunschweig, employed on regional and local lines. Regional and local passenger traffic in the Harz region was carried out almost exclusively by these trainsets.

Whereas the successor class 614 units supplemented DB's DMU fleet, the class 628.2 regular types coming into service after 1986 began to displace class 624 into subordinate services. Retirement of class 624/634 trainsets started in 2003, when DB lost a couple of tender procedures to private companies and modern light-weight DMUs came into service in large numbers. The last class 624/634 units were retired in 2005.

Fourteen trainsets were sold to Poland's PKP as Class SA110 and had been in use in regional and local service.

In Romania, several class 624 units are operated by Transferoviar Grup.

== Technical information ==
Only the front cars were motorised, therefore the trainsets could be assembled either with or without up to two middle cars. Up to three trainsets (i.e. six engines) could be operated as multiple traction, connected by Scharfenberg couplers, which were also used to connect front and middle cars. Each front car was equipped with a 331 kW MAN diesel engine, the power being transferred hydro-dynamically to the front-end bogie.

The passenger compartment's layout was derived from the so-called Silberling (silverling) polished stainless steel short-line passenger coaches, with open-plan compartments. The trains had oil heating.

The Class 624/634 was compatible with its successor DB Class 614, so all units could be in mixed plans, including mixed use of middle cars.
