= Frumoasa =

Frumoasa may refer to several places in Romania:

- Frumoasa, Harghita, a commune in Harghita County
- Frumoasa, Teleorman, a commune in Teleorman County
- Frumoasa, a village in Balcani Commune, Bacău County
- Frumoasa, a village in Moara Commune, Suceava County
- Frumoasa Monastery
- Frumoasa, a tributary of the Valea Locii in Iași County
- Frumoasa (Olt), a tributary of the Racul in Harghita County
- Frumoasa, a tributary of the Șomuzul Mare in Suceava County
- Frumoasa, a tributary of the Tazlău in Bacău County
- Dolia Frumoasă, a tributary of the Rudăreasa in Vâlcea County
- Valea Frumoasă, a tributary of the Borumlaca in Bihor County

and one place in Moldova:

- Frumoasa, Călărași, a commune in Călărași District
