= Frumușița =

- Commune
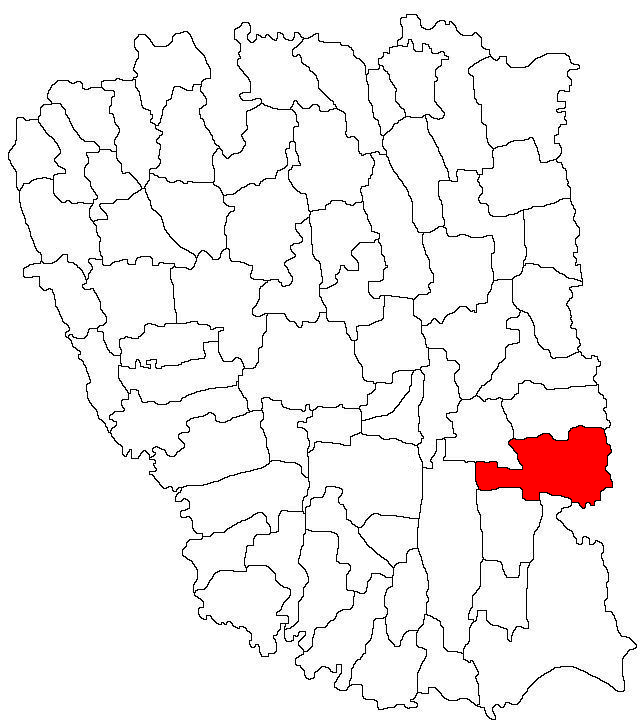
- Location in Galați County

- Location in Romania
- Coordinates: 45°40′N 28°4′E
- Country: Romania
- County: Galați
- Population (2021-12-01): 5,067
- Time zone: EET/EEST (UTC+2/+3)
- Vehicle reg.: GL

Frumușița is a commune in Galați County, Western Moldavia, Romania with a population of 5,165 people. It is composed of three villages: Frumușița, Ijdileni and Tămăoani.
