= Târgu Bujor =

- Town
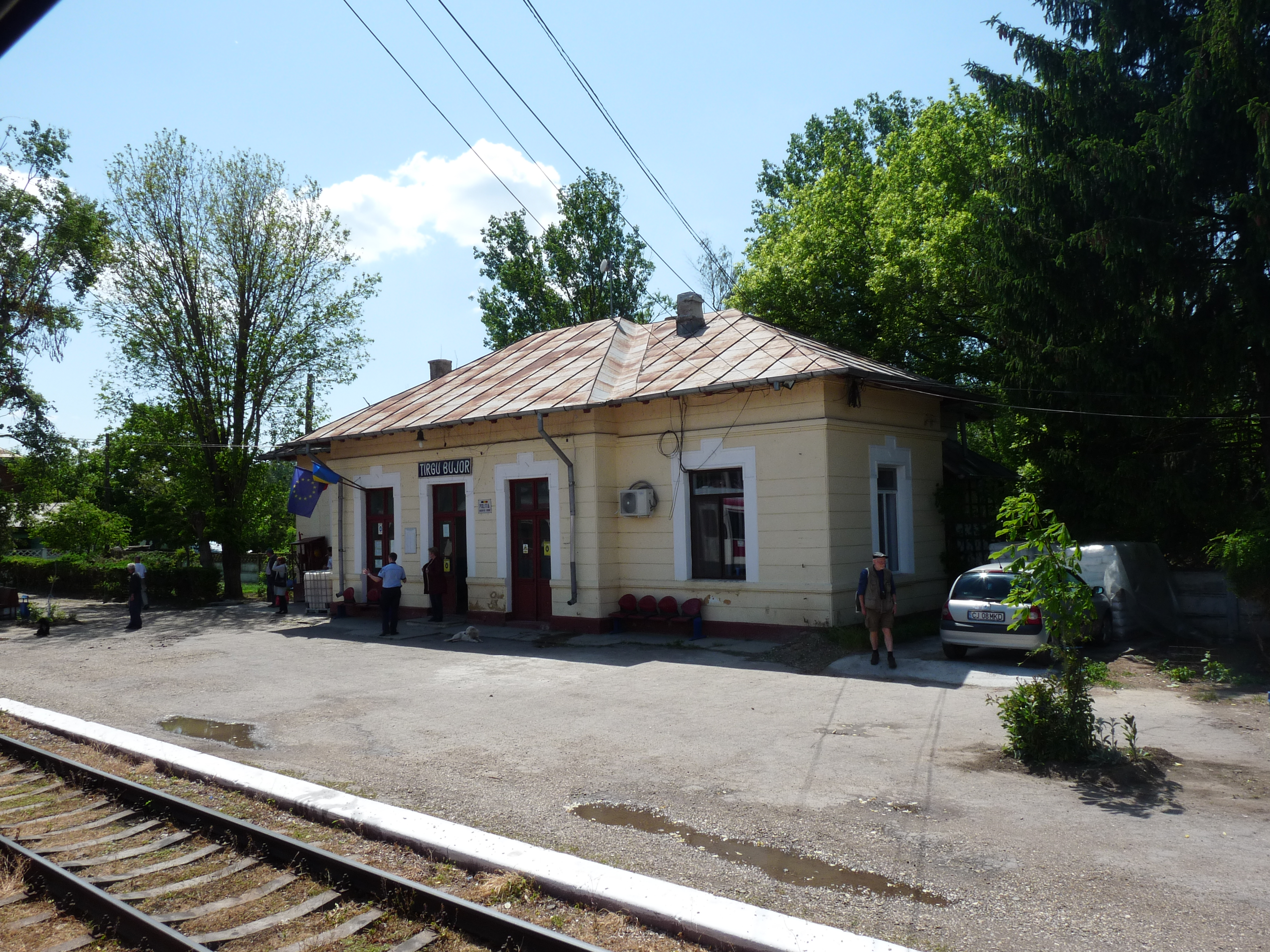
- Târgu Bujor train station

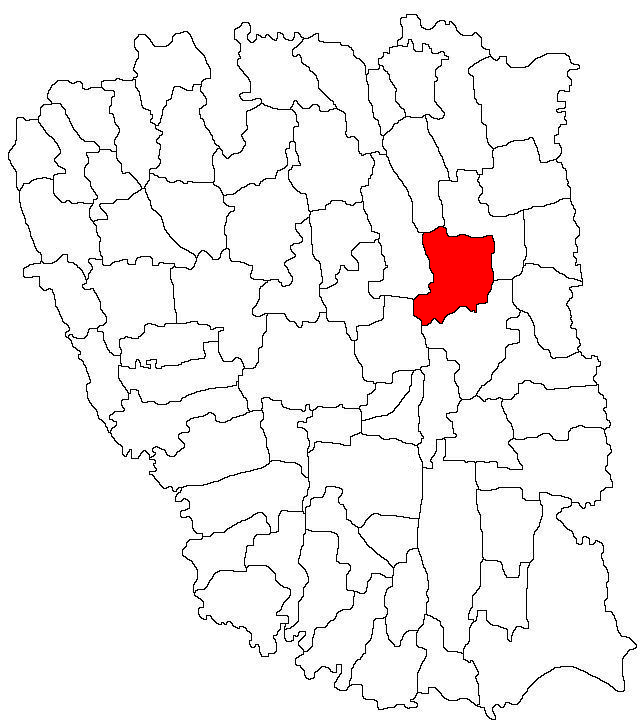
- Location in Galați County

- Location in Romania
- Coordinates: 45°52′N 27°54′E
- Country: Romania
- County: Galați

Government
  - Mayor (2024–2028): Ion Andone (PSD)
- Area: 81.23 km^{2} (31.36 sq mi)
- Elevation: 100 m (330 ft)
- Population (2021-12-01): 5,946
  - Density: 73.20/km^{2} (189.6/sq mi)
- Time zone: UTC+02:00 (EET)
  - Summer (DST): UTC+03:00 (EEST)
- Postal code: 805200
- Area code: (+40) 0236
- Vehicle reg.: GL
- Website: www.primariatgbujor.ro

Târgu Bujor is a town in Galați County, Romania. It administers two villages, Moscu and Umbrărești. It is situated in the historical region of Western Moldavia.

The town is located in the southern part of the Moldavian Plateau, at the confluence of the Bujorul stream and the Chineja river. It is located in the central part of Galați County, on the county road DJ242, some 8 east of the national road DN24D and 57 km (35 mi) north of the county seat, Galați.

== Natives ==
- Iulian-Gabriel Bîrsan (1956–2022), engineer and politician
- Eremia Grigorescu (1863–1919), general during World War I and Minister of War in 1918
- Grigore Hagiu (1933–1985), poet

Historical population
Year	Pop.	±%
1977	7,583	—
1992	7,965	+5.0%
2002	8,044	+1.0%
2011	6,148	−23.6%
2021	5,946	−3.3%
Source: Census data

== Climate ==
Târgu Bujor's climate is humid continental (Dfb).

Climate data for Târgu Bujor
Month	Jan	Feb	Mar	Apr	May	Jun	Jul	Aug	Sep	Oct	Nov	Dec	Year
Mean daily maximum °C (°F)	1.0 (33.8)	2.8 (37.0)	8.8 (47.8)	16.7 (62.1)	22.5 (72.5)	25.9 (78.6)	27.8 (82.0)	27.5 (81.5)	23.5 (74.3)	16.8 (62.2)	9.2 (48.6)	3.3 (37.9)	15.5 (59.9)
Daily mean °C (°F)	−2.3 (27.9)	−0.6 (30.9)	4.4 (39.9)	11.2 (52.2)	16.7 (62.1)	20.1 (68.2)	21.8 (71.2)	21.4 (70.5)	17.5 (63.5)	11.4 (52.5)	5.4 (41.7)	0.3 (32.5)	10.6 (51.1)
Mean daily minimum °C (°F)	−5.5 (22.1)	−3.9 (25.0)	0.0 (32.0)	5.7 (42.3)	11.0 (51.8)	14.4 (57.9)	15.9 (60.6)	15.4 (59.7)	11.5 (52.7)	6.1 (43.0)	1.7 (35.1)	−2.6 (27.3)	5.8 (42.5)
Average precipitation mm (inches)	28 (1.1)	31 (1.2)	27 (1.1)	40 (1.6)	54 (2.1)	70 (2.8)	55 (2.2)	46 (1.8)	44 (1.7)	27 (1.1)	34 (1.3)	32 (1.3)	488 (19.3)
Source: Climate-data.org
