= Băneasa, Galați =

Băneasa
- Commune
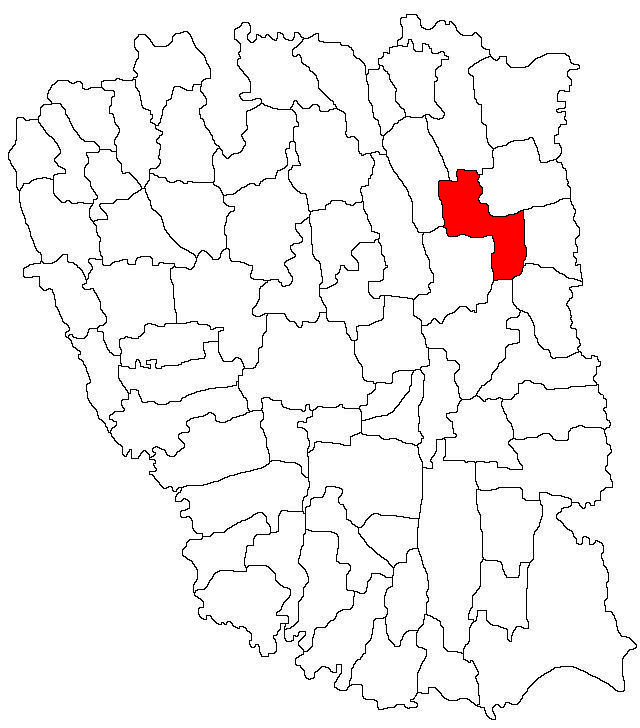
- Location in Galați County

- Location in Romania
- Coordinates: 45°56′53″N 27°56′01″E
- Country: Romania
- County: Galați

Government
  - Mayor (2024–2028): George Aurelian Gache (PSD)
- Area: 72.85 km^{2} (28.13 sq mi)
- Elevation: 77 m (253 ft)
- Population (2021-12-01): 1,992
  - Density: 27.34/km^{2} (70.82/sq mi)
- Time zone: UTC+02:00 (EET)
  - Summer (DST): UTC+03:00 (EEST)
- Postal code: 807030
- Area code: (+40) 0236
- Vehicle reg.: GL
- Website: www.primariacomuneibaneasa.ro

Băneasa is a commune in Galați County, Western Moldavia, Romania. It is composed of two villages, Băneasa and Roșcani.

Historical population
Year	Pop.	±%
2002	2,202	—
2011	1,825	−17.1%
2021	1,992	+9.2%
Source: Census data

At the 2021 census, the commune had a population of 1,992; of those, 91.92% were Romanians and 4.42% Roma.
