= Lower Danube metropolitan area =

Danube metropolitan area
- Metropolitan area
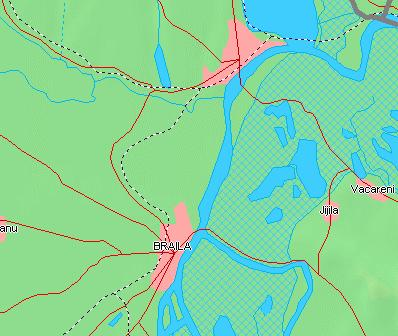
- Country: Romania
- County: Galați County; Brăila County; Tulcea County
- Central Municipalities: Galați, Brăila
- Functional: proposed

Area
  - Total: 1,702.17 km^{2} (657.21 sq mi)

Population (2021 census)
  - Total: 441,801
  - Density: 260/km^{2} (670/sq mi)
- Time zone: UTC+2 (EET)
  - Summer (DST): UTC+3 (EEST)
- Postal Code: ??wxyz^{1}
- Area code: + x??^{2}
- ^{1}w, x, y, and z are digits that indicate the street, part of the street, or even the building of the address^{2}x is a digit indicating the operator: 2 for the former national operator, Romtelecom, and 3 for the other ground telephone networks

The Danube metropolitan area or Galați–Brăila metropolitan area is a proposed metropolitan area project in Romania. It would be formed from the cities of Galați and Brăila, and 15 nearby communes from Galați, Brăila and Tulcea counties. Together they have a population of 441,801 people, of whom 372,537 live in the cities of Galați and Brăila (as of 2021).

As defined by Eurostat, as of 2015 the Galați functional urban area has a population of 322,501 residents, whilst the Brăila functional urban area has a population of 217,645 residents.

== Overview ==
If completed, it would represent one of the largest metropolitan areas in Romania. Several major infrastructure projects have been proposed, or are being actively built: the Brăila–Galați Expressway, a bridge (the Brăila Bridge) across the Danube connecting Brăila and Galați counties to Tulcea County, and a new airport in Braniștea-Schela area.

The metropolitan area has a border checkpoint to Moldova and Ukraine. Galați is located 10 km (6.2 mi) from Giurgiulești and 20 km (12 mi) from Reni.

== Demographics ==
Population census
Year	2011	2021
Pop.	496,844	441,801
±%	—	−11.1%

== Subdivisions ==
Name	County	Population (2011 census)	Population (2021 census)	Area (km^{2})
Galați	Galați	249,432	217,851	246.40
Braniștea	Galați	3,972	3,956	61.95
Foltești	Galați	3,057	3,262	69.00
Frumușița	Galați	4,800	5,067	101.00
Independența	Galați	4,375	4,371	67.45
Scânteiești	Galați	2,490	2,283	50.23
Schela	Galați	3,690	3,509	44.20
Smârdan	Galați	4,810	5,342	131.57
Șendreni	Galați	3,641	5,065	47.34
Tulucești	Galați	7,200	6,407	77.23
Vânători	Galați	4,864	6,926	44.93
Brăila	Brăila	180,302	154,686	77.9
Chiscani	Brăila	5,340	6,151	299.40
Vădeni	Brăila	4,127	3,700	160.44
Măcin	Tulcea	8,245	7,248	44
I. C. Brătianu	Tulcea	1,187	1,143	48.77
Jijila	Tulcea	5,312	4,834	130.36
Total	-	496,844	441,801	1702.17
