= Highways in Romania =

The current situation of motorways and expressways in Romania Completed motorways Completed expressways Under construction (including design-build contracts) Tendered Environmental permit issued Planned

Controlled-access highways in Romania are dual carriageways, grade separated with controlled-access, designed for high speeds. There are two types of highways, motorways (Romanian: Autostrăzi, sing. Autostradă) and expressways (Romanian: Drumuri expres, sing. Drum expres), with the main difference being that motorways have emergency lanes and slightly wider lanes. The maximum allowed speed limit for motorways is 130 km/h (81 mph), while for expressways the limit is 120 km/h (75 mph). There are no toll roads, but a road vignette(rovinietă) is required.

The first construction works began in 1967, and the first highway segment was opened in 1972. However, extension of the high-speed road network lagged behind until after EU accession in 2007, when improved utilization of the allocated EU funds enabled Romania to speed up the expansion of its highway network.

Only A2, A10 and DEx12 are completed, while A1 is mostly completed with all its remaining sections currently being built. A3 has five segments that are currently in use, with most of the remaining ones being in various stages of construction or tendering. A4, A6, A11 and DEx4 currently have only small segments in use. DEx12 was the first expressway to be opened in 2022. Construction contracts for part of A0, A7, A8, A9, A13, DEx6, DEx11 and DEx14 are in various stages of execution or tendering.

As of 4 November 2026, there are 1,486.545 km of highways in service (of which 1,348.789 km motorways and 137.756 km expressways – 4.11.2026), with another 956 km with signed contracts in various stages of execution, and another 348 km being tendered.

Romania Highways as of September 2026

== Legislation ==

In 2012, legislation amendments defined two types of highways: motorways (Romanian: Autostrăzi) and expressways (Romanian: Drumuri expres). Motorways are identified by A followed by a number while expressways are identified by DEx followed by a number.

There are almost no tolls for using roads in Romania, with exception of large bridges. There is one at the Giurgeni – Vadu Oii Bridge over the river Danube on highway DN2A/E60 at Vadu Oii and one at the Cernavodă Bridge, on the A2 motorway/E81. There is another bridge, the Brăila Bridge that crosses the Danube, on the highway DN2S/E87 into Tulcea County that is toll free from 2023 until 2028. Nevertheless, every owner of a car that uses a motorway (A), an expressway (DEx) or a national road (DN) in Romania must purchase a vignette (rovinietă) from any of the main petrol stations or at any post office throughout the country.

The main differences are that motorways have wide emergency lanes (3 m) and slightly wider traffic lanes (by 3.75 versus 3.5 m). Expressways only have a narrow 1.5 m gravel roadside on the right side, added to the 0.5 m asphalted road edges, and may not have acceleration and deceleration lanes in mountainous areas. The maximum allowed speed limit is 130 km/h (81 mph) (80 km/h (50 mph) during poor conditions), while expressways have a maximum speed limit of 120 km/h (75 mph). Generally, feasibility studies for motorways have a minimum projected speed of 100 km/h, while for expressways, it is reduced to 80 km/h.

== History ==
Controlled-access network size
Year	Opened (km)	Total (km)
1972	95.5	95.5
1987	17.6	113.1
2004	97.3	210.4
2007	50.2	260.6
2009	41.5	302
2010	27.8	329.8
2011	55.3	385.1
2012	139.5	524.6
2013	107.7	632.3
2014	50.9	683.1
2015	46	729.1
2017	15.4	744.6
2018	59.5	804.1
2019	43.3	847.4
2020	61.3	908.7
2021	30.3	938.9
2022	53	991.9
2023	80.5	1,072.4
2024	199.4	1,271.8
2025	144.6	1,416.4
2026	70.1	1,486.5

=== First projects ===
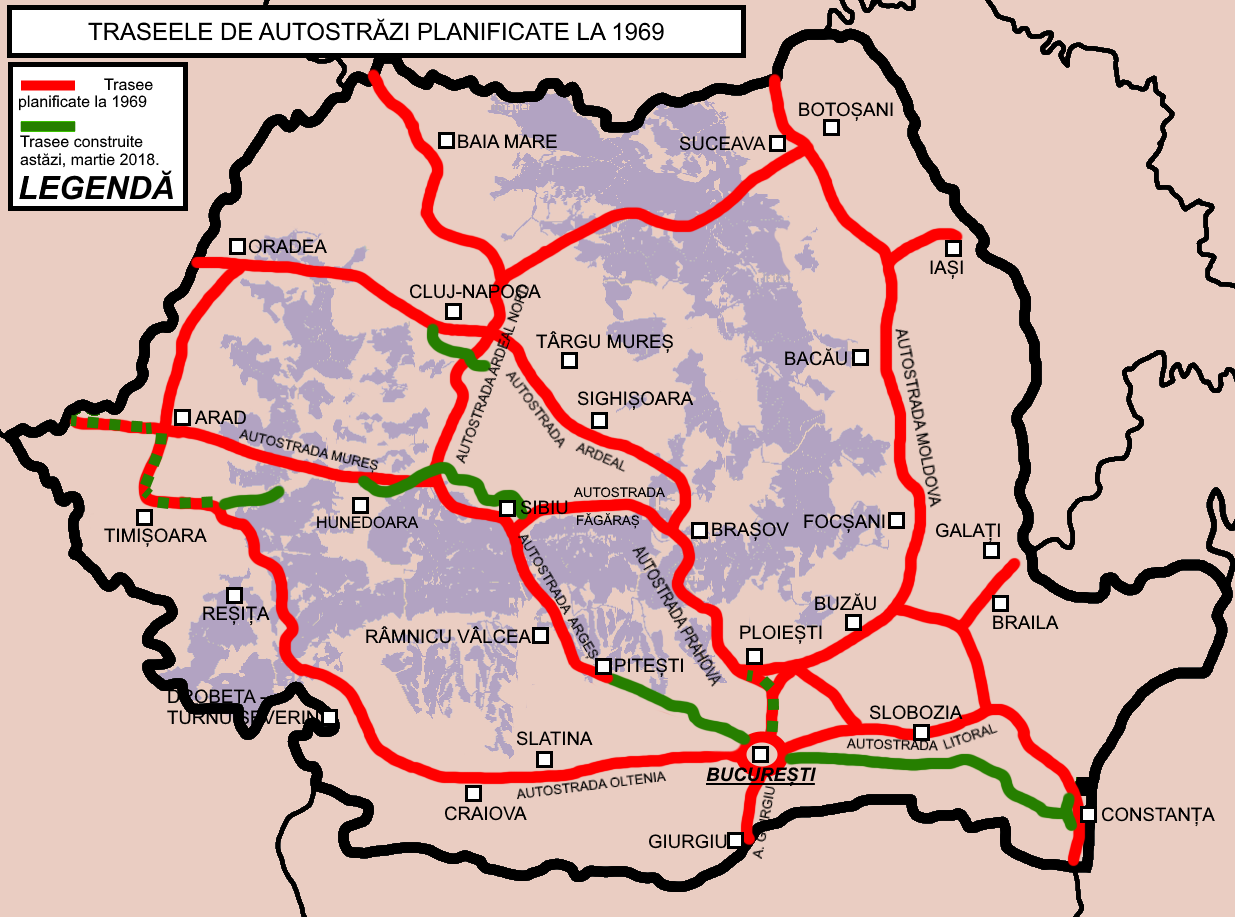
Motorway plan of 1969 (in red) and the motorways opened by 23 March 2018 (in green)

The construction of the first motorway in Romania began in 1967, and the first segment of the A1 motorway, from Pitești to the capital Bucharest was opened in 1972 with a total length of 96 km. During the building of this motorway, a general plan was released in 1969, detailing the building of motorways in the incoming years, however, due to low volumes of traffic, the communist regime focused on improving current roads instead. Until the collapse of the communist regime in 1989, the building of a second motorway between Bucharest and Constanța had been planned, but only an 18 km long segment of A2 from Fetești to Cernavodă opened in 1987.

In the 1990s, the transition from a centralized economy to a market economy severely limited investment into infrastructure projects, and the entire motorway network totaled 113 km for many years until the construction project of A2 was resumed in 1998. Actual construction began in 2001, and three segments were finally opened in 2004 (Bucharest – Fundulea – Lehliu – Drajna) and another in 2007 (Drajna – Fetești) totaling around 130 km. The A1 motorway was extended also in 2007 with the Pitești bypass. A large sector of A3, termed "Transylvania Motorway", was awarded controversially in 2004 without bidding to the American Bechtel Corporation. Large cost overruns and delays ensued for this project, and after political controversies, most of the contracts were cancelled, and only some 50 km of the Cluj bypass (Gilău – Turda – Câmpia Turzii) were opened between 2009 and 2010, at much larger costs than initially signed in the contract.

The highway network in 2010

=== Accessing EU funds ===
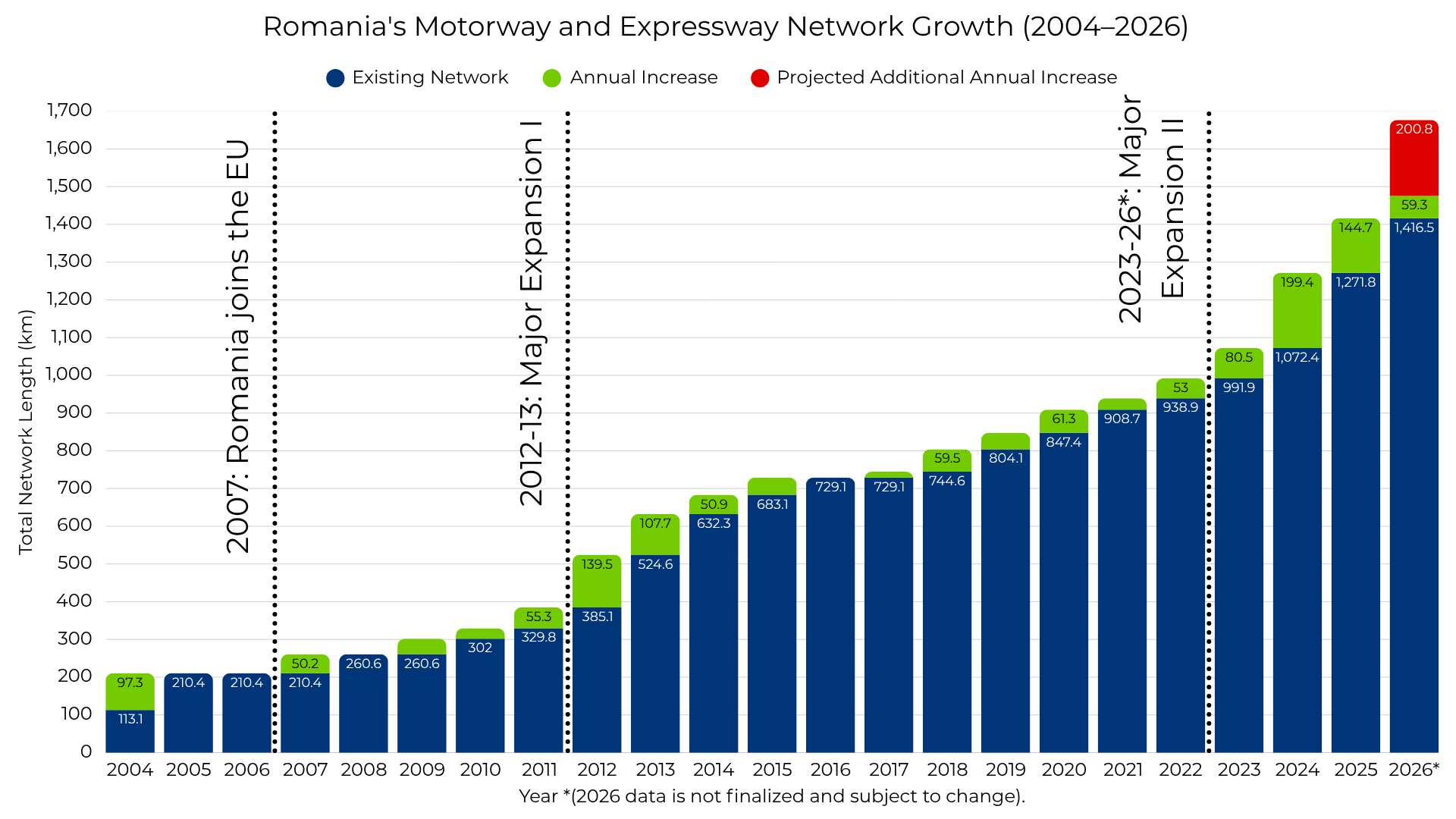
The development of Romania's motorway and expressway network from 2004 to 2026.

After joining the European Union in 2007, Romania was able to access funds for infrastructure development more easily, especially for those part of the Pan-European Corridor IV overlapping with A1 and A2 motorways. Many segments of the A1 motorway were started, and by the end of 2011 around 85 km were partially or fully opened: A1 segments Timișoara – Arad and Sibiu bypass; A2 segment Murfatlar – Constanța; A4 Constanța bypass and A11 Arad bypass. In 2012 more segments were opened on A1 (Deva – Simeria), A2 (Cernavodă – Murfatlar), A4, and the first A3 segment not built by Bechtel (Bucharest – Ploiești). More segments were opened over the next few years: on A1 (part of Lugoj – Deva, Sibiu – Orăștie – Simeria, Arad – Nădlac, Timișoara – Lugoj), A6 (Balinț – Lugoj), and A4. A total of 726.6 km of motorways were in use in Romania in December 2015.

Political debates and changes in priorities of left-leaning parties after 2014 greatly slowed down motorway projects. With no new openings in 2016, a small segment part of Lugoj – Deva opening in 2017, almost half of the A10 (Aiud – Turda), and part of A3 (Ungheni – Iernut, Gilău – Nădășelu, and the entrance into Bucharest) brought the total to over 800 km at the end of 2018. Two more segments of the A1 opened in 2019 (between Coșevița and Deva), providing an almost fully opened motorway (excluding a segment of 13.5 km) between the border with Hungary and Sibiu. In 2020, more segments were opened, on A3 (Biharia − Borș, Iernut − Chețani, Râșnov − Cristian), on A10 (Sebeș – Alba Iulia), and the first segment of A7 (Bacău bypass) bringing the total to over 900 km of highways. In 2021, A10 completely opened (Alba Iulia – Aiud) and a segment of A3 (Târgu Mureș – Ungheni) opened to traffic. In 2022 the first segment of an expressway-class road in Romania open for traffic, the DEx12 expressway: between Balș and Slatina (16.0 km), and Slatina bypass.

The highway network in 2020

=== Current projects ===
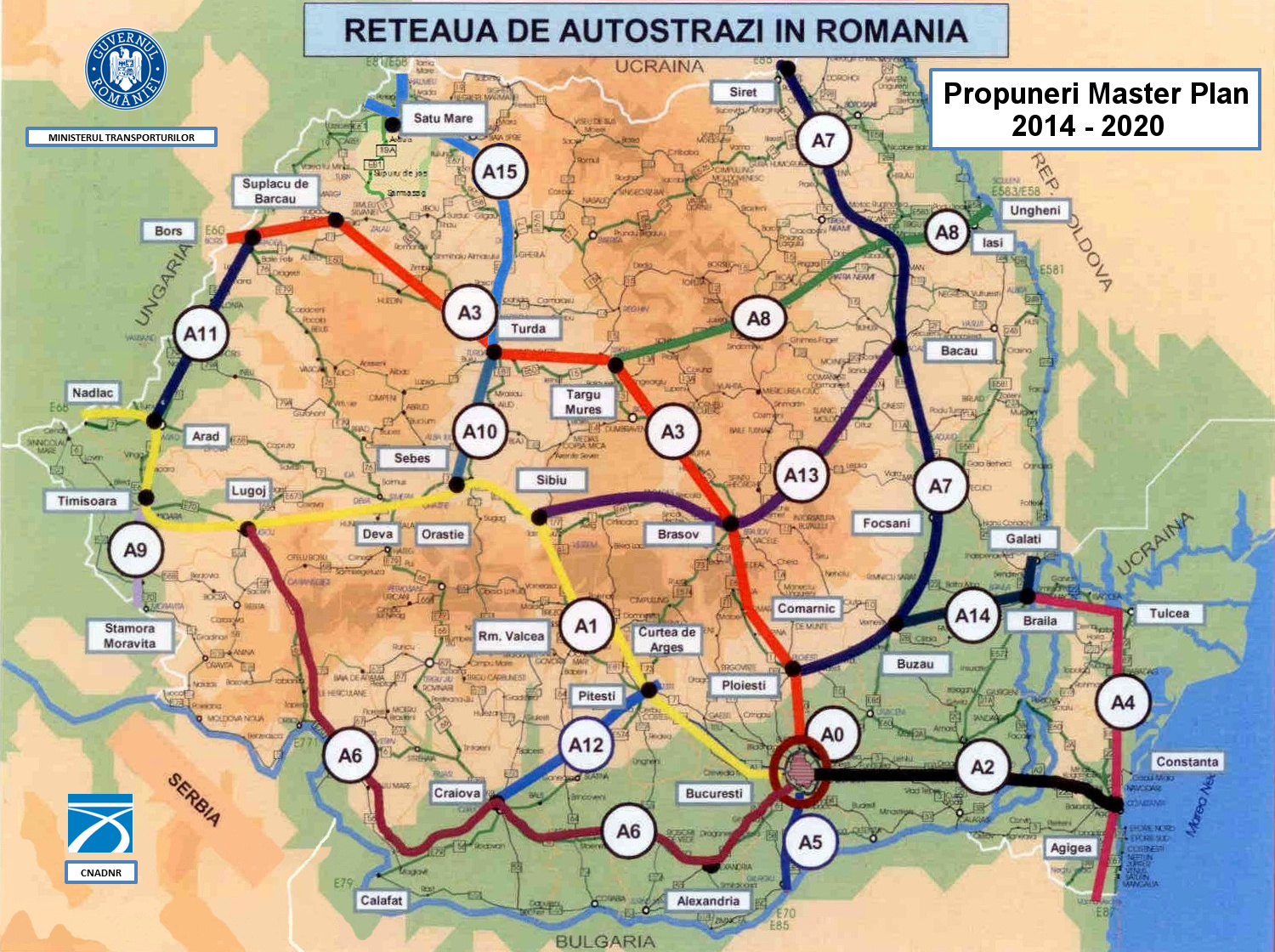
The official highway plan, proposed by the Ministry of Transport and CNADNR (CNAIR) in 2014.

As of December 2023, over 750 km of controlled-access roads have contracted for construction. These contracts include: part of the A3 (some 68.6 km), all segments of the A1 between Sibiu – Pitești (122.9 km), almost all of the Bucharest Ring Motorway (91.4 km), a section of the A8 (29.9 km), as well as most segments of the A7 (319 km).

Currently the only completed motorways are A2 and A10. The unfinished segments of A1 and A3 are in various stages of tendering and construction, with multiple segments likely to finish by 2024-2028.

A few more motorways have received active discussion, including the termed A0 Bucharest Motorway Ring Road as an outer ring to the Bucharest Ring Road, with construction contracts signed or tendered for all of its 100 km length. The A7 motorway, between Ploiești and the border with Ukraine, has been planned to be part of the Pan-European Corridor IX, but so far only the Bacău bypass has been built. However, PNRR funding is ensured for most of its segments, with tendering contracts existing for its first 320 km till Pașcani. Beyond Pașcani, the Corridor IX is envisioned to be covered by the A8 (the East–West Motorway, a link between Moldavia and Transylvania), with the first construction contract signed in 2023. Highways crossing the Carpathian Mountains have been delayed due to large costs, with debates on whether to build the A3 (through long-term concession contracts) or the A1 (EU funds would cover most of the cost). The A13 motorway is planned to serve as an alternative to link the A1 and the A3, then to the A7, with the first 68 km currently being under construction.

A9 is planned to link A1 to Serbia, with plans to sign the first construction contracts not earlier than 2023. Expressways extending the current A11 as well as the DEx6 linking Galați and Brăila are currently being constructed. Plans to extend the current network with expressways exist for A4, A5 (planned to link to Bulgaria), A6, and A14 corridors, as well as several other smaller ones.

=== Future timeline ===
Contracted segments with estimated openings:

2026

- Pitești - Sibiu, section 4 between Curtea de Argeș - Tigveni (9.861 km) (Q4)
- Bucharest North Ring, section 1 between Săbăreni (DN7) - Corbeanca (10.6 km) [+2.4 km A0-North 2] (Q4)
- Gilău - Borș, section 3C1 between Suplacu de Barcău - Chiribiș (20.25 km) (Q4)
- Gilău - Borș, sections 3A2 and 3B1 between Nădășelu - Zimbor (30.6 km) (Q4)
- Bacău - Pașcani, sections 1 and 2 between Bacău - Săbăoani (49.3 km) (Q4)

Total: 123.011 km

2027

- Gilău - Borș, section 3C2 between Chiribiș - Biharia (34.65 km) (Q1)
- Brăila - Galați (10.77 km) (Q2)
- Bucharest North Ring, section 1 between Bâcu (DJ601A) - Săbăreni (DN7) (6.9 km) [+2.5 km A0-South 3] (Q2)
- Bacău - Pașcani, section 3 between Săbăoani - Mogoșești Siret (9.88 km) (Q2)
- Târgu Mureș - Ditrău, section 1A between Gheorge Doja (A3) - Acățari (DN13) (12.51 km) (Q2)
- Târgu Mureș - Ditrău, section 1A between Acățari (DN13) - Miercurea Nirajului (DJ135) (11.88 km) (Q2/Q3)
- Deva - Lugoj, section 2E between Holdea - Margina (9.13 km) (Q3)
- Boița (A1) - Făgăraș, section 2 between Mârșa (DJ105G) - Arpașu de Jos (DN1) (19.922 km) (Q3)
- Bacău - Pașcani, section 3 between Mogoșești Siret - Pașcani (18.213 km) (Q3)
- Boița (A1) - Făgăraș, section 3 between Arpașu de Jos (DN1) - Sâmbăta de Sus (DJ105B) (17.61 km) (Q3/Q4)
- Boița (A1) - Făgăraș, section 4 between Sâmbăta de Sus (DJ105B) - Făgăraș (DC67) (16.265 km) (Q4)

Total: 170.23 km

2028

- Târgu Mureș - Ditrău, section 1B between Miercurea Nirajului (DJ135) - Sărățeni (DN13A) (23.4 km)
- Târgu Mureș - Ditrău, section 1D between Joseni (DN13B) - Ditrău (DN12) (14.4 km)
- Ditrău - Târgu Neamț, section 2D between Vânători-Neamț (DN15B) - Boureni (DN2) (29.912 km)
- Târgu Neamț - Iași - Ungheni, section 1 between Boureni (DN2) - Pașcani (5.50 km)
- Boița (A1) - Făgăraș, section 1 between Boița (A1) - Mârșa (DJ105G) (14.253 km)
- Arad - Oradea, section 1 between Oradea - Salonta (33.7 km)
- Arad - Oradea, section 2 between Salonta - Chișineu-Criș (39.7 km)
- Arad - Oradea, section 3 between Arad - Chișineu-Criș (47.07 km)
- Salonta - Újszalonta (HU) (10 km)
- Pucioasa - Fieni (12.68 km)

Total: 230.615 km

2029

- Pitești - Sibiu, section 2 between Copăceni - Boița (31.33 km)
- Pitești - Sibiu, section 3 Tigveni - Copăceni (37.4 km)
- Pașcani - Suceava, section 1 between Pașcani - Roșcani (33.00 km)
- Pașcani - Suceava, section 2 between Roșcani - Suceava (28.97 km)
- Ditrău - Târgu Neamț, section 2A between Ditrău (DN12) - Grințieș (DN15) (37.9 km)
- Ditrău - Târgu Neamț, section 2C between Pipirig (DN15B) - Vânători Neamț (DN15B) (19.3 km)
- Satu Mare - Oar (10.83 km)
- Focșani - Brăila (73.524 km)

Total: 272.254 km

2030

- Târgu Mureș - Ditrău, section 1C between Sărățeni (DN13A) - Joseni (DN13B) (32.4 km)
- Ditrău - Târgu Neamț, section 2B between Grințieș (DN15) - Pipirig (DN15B) (31.5 km)
- Târgu Neamț - Iași - Ungheni, section 1 between Pașcani - Târgu Frumos (DN28B) (21.5 km)
- Târgu Neamț - Iași - Ungheni, section 3 between Lețcani (DN28) - Vulturi (DN24) (17.7 km)
- Târgu Neamț - Iași - Ungheni, section 4 between Vulturi (DN24) - Ungheni (DN28G) (15.47 km)

Total: 118.57 km

2031

- Mihăiești - Suplacu de Barcău (3B), section 3B2 between Poarta Sălajului - Zalău (15.14 km)
- Mihăiești - Suplacu de Barcău (3B), section 3B3 between Zalău - Nușfalău (25.84 km)

Total: 40.98 km

In total, some 956 km of highways and expressways are currently contracted with builder after tenders and appeals, to be built by 2031.

== Motorways in Romania ==
Motorway (A)			Map	Route			Total length (km)	In service		Under construction (km)	Tendered (km)	Years of construction
Sign	E-roads	Name	Map	From	Via	To	Total length (km)	(km)	%	Under construction (km)	Tendered (km)	Years of construction
Bucharest Ring Motorway		Bucharest; Ring Road	A0 motorway	Bucharest	– – – –	Bucharest	100.765	78.935	78.33%	21.83	–	2020 -
A1 motorway (Romania)	European route E68 European route E81	Transcarpathian	A1 motorway	Bucharest	– – Pitești – – Sibiu – – Deva – – Lugoj – Timișoara – Arad –	Nădlac (Hungary)	581.04	486.66	83.75%	91.84	–	1967 -
A2 motorway (Romania)	European route E81	Sun	A2 motorway	Bucharest	Fetești – Cernavodă –	Constanța	202.75	202.75	100%	–	–	1983 - 2012
A3 motorway (Romania)	European route E81	Transilvania	A3 motorway map	Bucharest	– Ploiești – – Brașov – Sighișoara – – Târgu Mureș – – – Cluj-Napoca – Zalău – Oradea –	Borș (Hungary)	603	212.786	35.29%	125.96	–	2004 -
A4 motorway (Romania)	European route E81	Constanța; Bypass		Agigea	A2 motorway (Romania)	Ovidiu	21.8	21.8	100%	–	–	2009 - 2013
Bucharest–Giurgiu Motorway		Vlasia		Bucharest		Giurgiu (Bulgaria)	55 (version)	0	under feasibility studies			/
A6 motorway (Romania)		Lugoj		Balinț		Lugoj	10.518	10.518	100%	–	–	2011 - 2013
A7 motorway (Romania)		Moldova	A7 motorway map	Dumbrava	Buzău – Focșani – – Bacău – Roman – – Pașcani –	Suceava	397.225	257.861	64.92%	139.364	–	2022 -
East–West Motorway (Romania)		Union	A8 motorway map (Romania)	Târgu Mureș	Sovata – Ditrău – Târgu Neamț – – Pașcani – Iași	Podu Jijiei (Moldova)	304.507	0	–	273.382	35.695	2024 -
Timișoara–Moravița Motorway		Banat	A9 motorway	Izvin	Voiteg	Moravița (Serbia)	72.93	0	–	–	69.16	/
A10 motorway (Romania)	European route E81	Mihai Viteazu		Sebeș	Alba Iulia – Aiud	Turda	70.00	70.00	100%	–	–	2013 - 2021
A11 motorway (Romania)		Arad; Bypass		Arad		Arad	3.5	3.5	100%	–	–	2011 - 2011
Sibiu–Bacău Motorway		Alexandru Ioan Cuza		Boița	Făgăraș – Codlea – Brașov – Sfântu Gheorghe – Onești	Răcăciuni	280 (version)	0	–	68.05	–	2024 -
Suceava–Oar Motorway		Northern		Suceava	Vatra Dornei – Bistrița – Dej	Baia Mare	370 (version)	0	under feasibility studies			/
A-		Southern		Bucharest	Alexandria - Craiova	Calafat (Bulgaria)	293 (version)	0	under feasibility studies			/
A-		Jiu		Craiova		Filiași	51.503	0	–	–	51.503	/
A-		Coast		Constanța	23 August – Mangalia	Vama Veche (Bulgaria)	50 (version)	0	–	–	30.59	/
						Total	3467.538	1,344.81	38.78%	720.426	186.948	

== Expressways in Romania ==
Expressway (DEx)			Route			Total length (km)	In service		Under construction (km)	Tendered (km)	Years of construction
Sign	E-roads	Name	From	Via	To	Total length (km)	(km)	%	Under construction (km)	Tendered (km)	Years of construction
DEx1		Bessarabia	Mărășești	Bârlad – Vaslui	Albița (Moldova)	160	0	under planning			/
Sign of expressway DEx4 in Romania		Someș	Turda (Petreștii de Jos)	Cluj-Napoca – Gherla	Dej	75 (version)	4.957	6.60%	under planning		2023 - 2025
Galați–Brăila Expressway		Danube	Brăila		Galați (Smârdan)	19.205	0	–	12.28	6.925	2021 -
Sign of expressway DEx7 in Romania		Bukovina	Suceava		Siret (Ukraine)	55.7	0	–	–	55.7	/
Sign of expressway DEx8 in Romania		Dobruja	Ovidiu		Tulcea	112.5	0	under planning			/
Sign of expressway DEx11 in Romania		Crișana	Arad	Chisineu-Cris – Salonta → (Hungary)	Oradea	120.47 + 10	0	–	130.47	-	2025 -
DEx12 expressway		Oltenia	Oarja	Slatina – Balș –	Craiova	121.115	121.115	100%	–	–	2018 - 2025
		Horea, Cloșca and Crișan	Satu Mare		Oar (Hungary)	10.83	0	–	10.83	–	2025 -
Sign of expressway DEx16 in Romania		Oradea; Bypass	Biharia		Oradea	11.636	11.636	100%	–	–	2022 - 2024
		Danubius	Filiași	Drobeta-Turnu Severin – Domașnea – Caransebeș	Lugoj	224 (version)	0	under feasibility studies			/
		Ardeal	Târgu Secuiesc	Bixad – Odorheiu Secuiesc – Cristuru Secuiesc – Sighișoara – Dumbrăveni	Ungheni	203 (version)	0	under planning			/
		Muntenia	Buzău	Făurei	Brăila	111.661	0	under feasibility studies			/
		Milcovia	Focșani		Brăila	73.524	0	–	73.524	–	2025 -
		Severin	Caransebeș	Reșița – Bocșa	Voiteg	104 (version)	0	under feasibility studies			/
		Tulcea	Jijila		Cataloi	61.63	0	under planning			/
		Vlad Țepeș	Găești	Târgoviște	Ploiești	76	0	under feasibility studies			/
		Valahia	Bucharest Ring Road		Târgoviște	62.21	0	under feasibility studies			/
		Bistrița	Bacău		Piatra Neamț	52.12	0	–	–	52.12	/
		Avram Iancu	Românași		Jibou	20	0	under planning			/
		Jiu	Filiași		Târgu Jiu	58.597	0	–	–	58.597	/
		Maramureș	Baia Mare		Satu Mare (Bypass)	59.17	0	under planning			/
		Mihai Eminescu	Suceava		Botoșani	26	0	under planning			/
		Dacia	Pitești		Mioveni	10.3	0	under planning			/
			Pucioasa		Fieni	12.68	0	–	12.68	–	2025 -
					Total	1,851.348	137.751	7.44%	239.784	160.692	

== Gallery ==
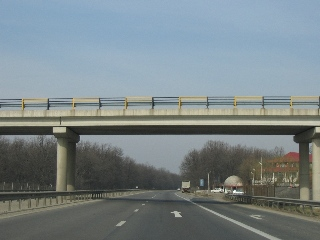
A1 motorway between Bucharest and Pitești, the first Romanian motorway

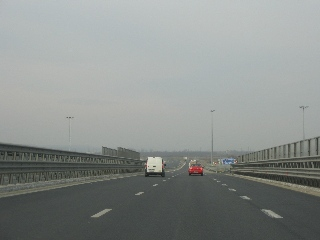
A1 motorway at Pitești bypass

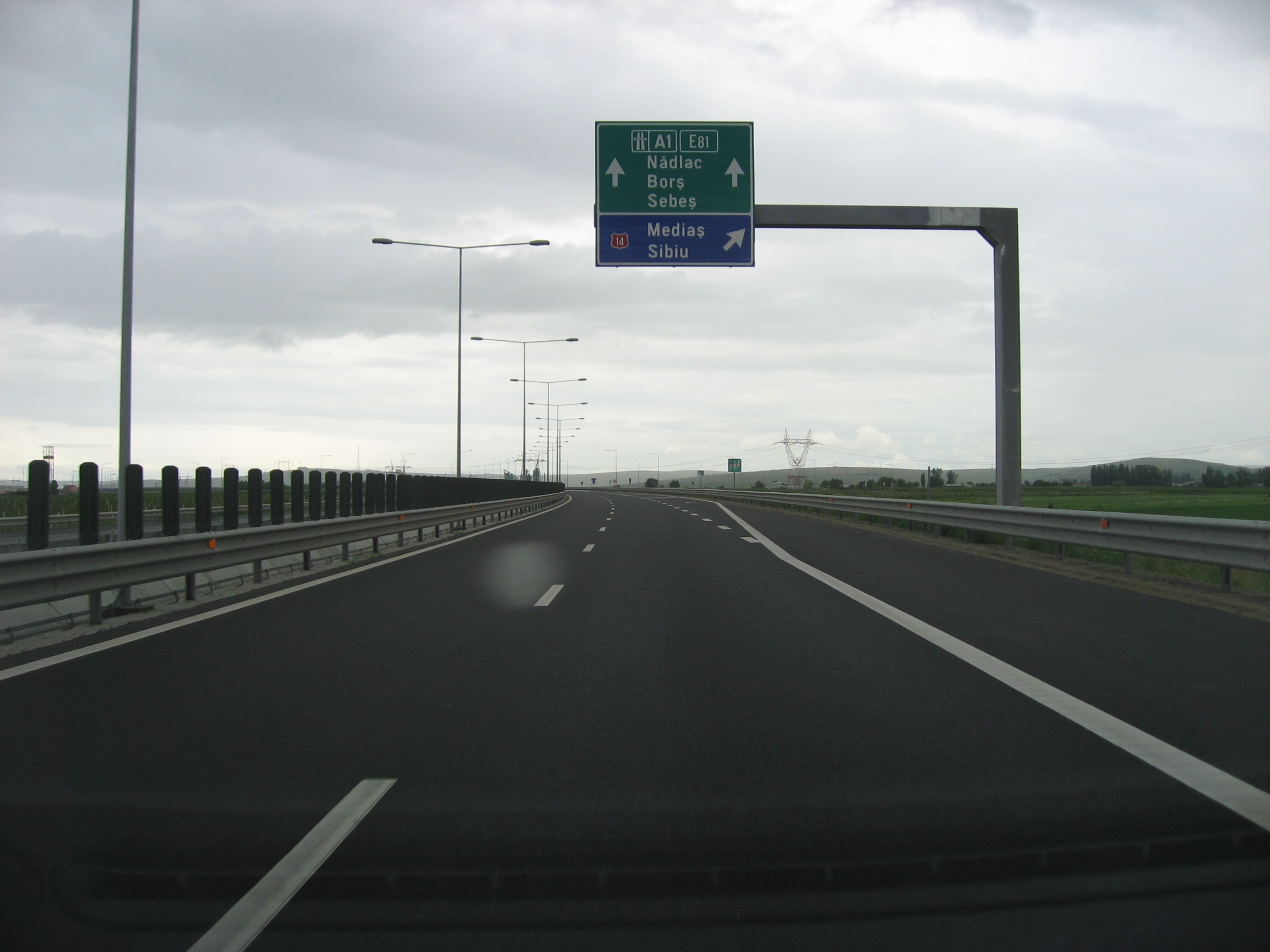
A1 motorway at Sibiu bypass, opened in 2010.

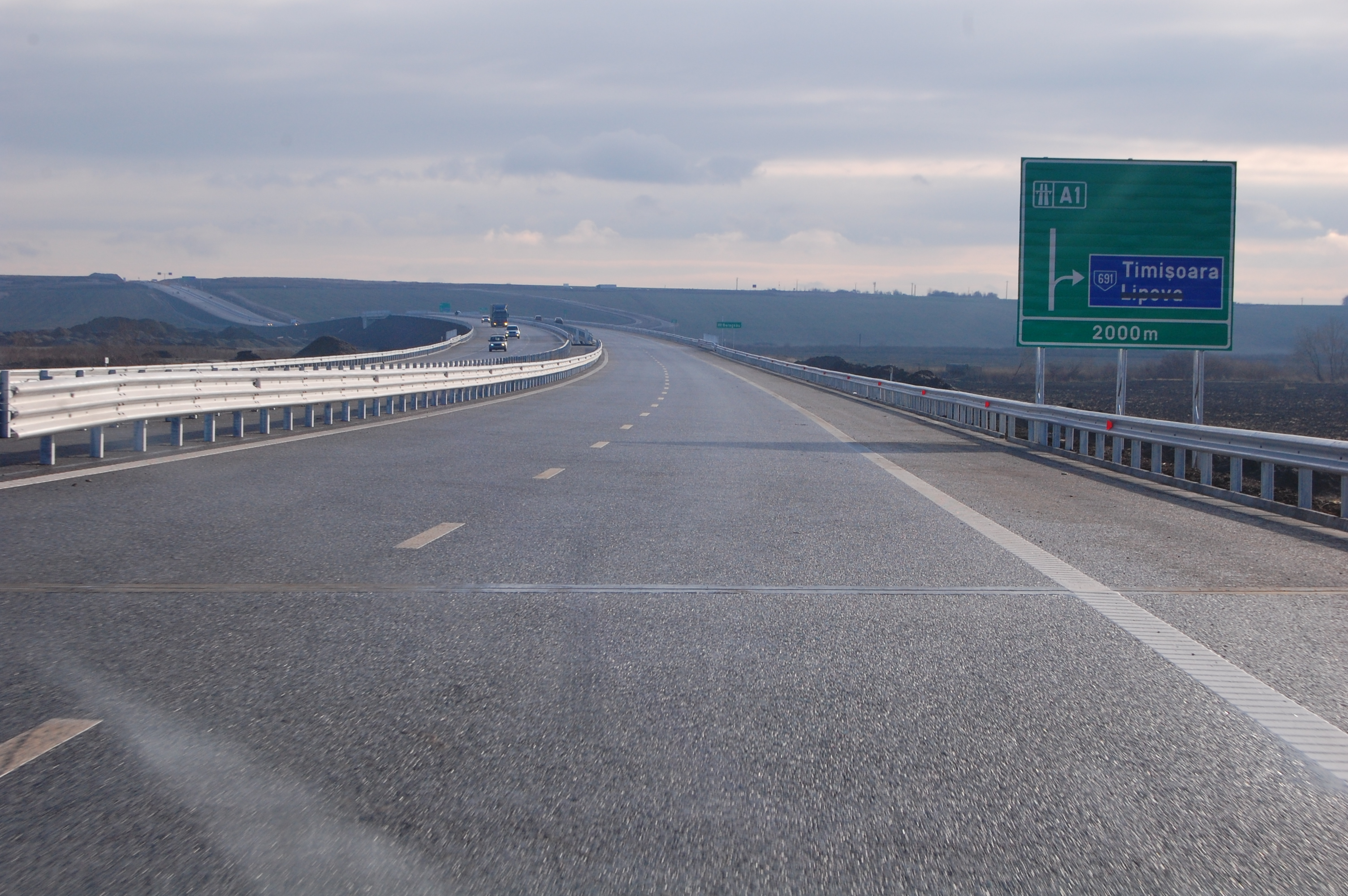
A1 motorway near Timișoara

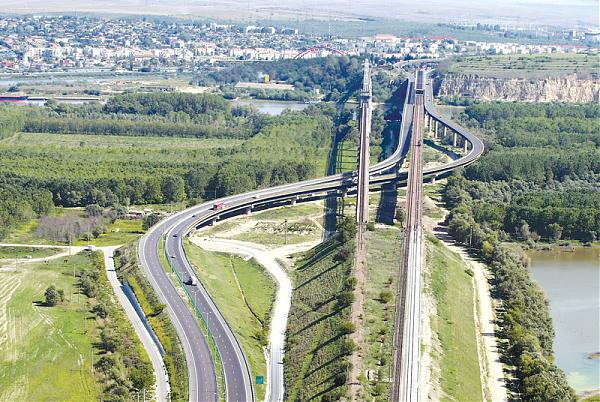
A2 motorway at Cernavodă, opened 1987

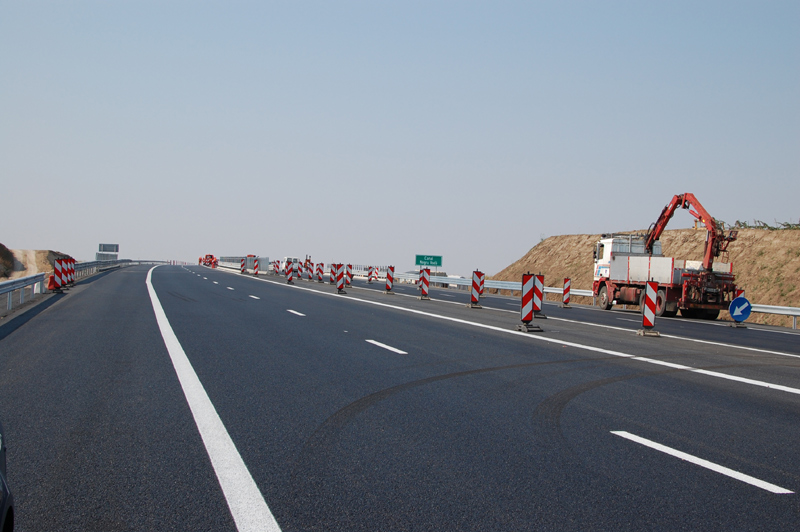
A2 motorway near Constanța at a junction with the A4 motorway

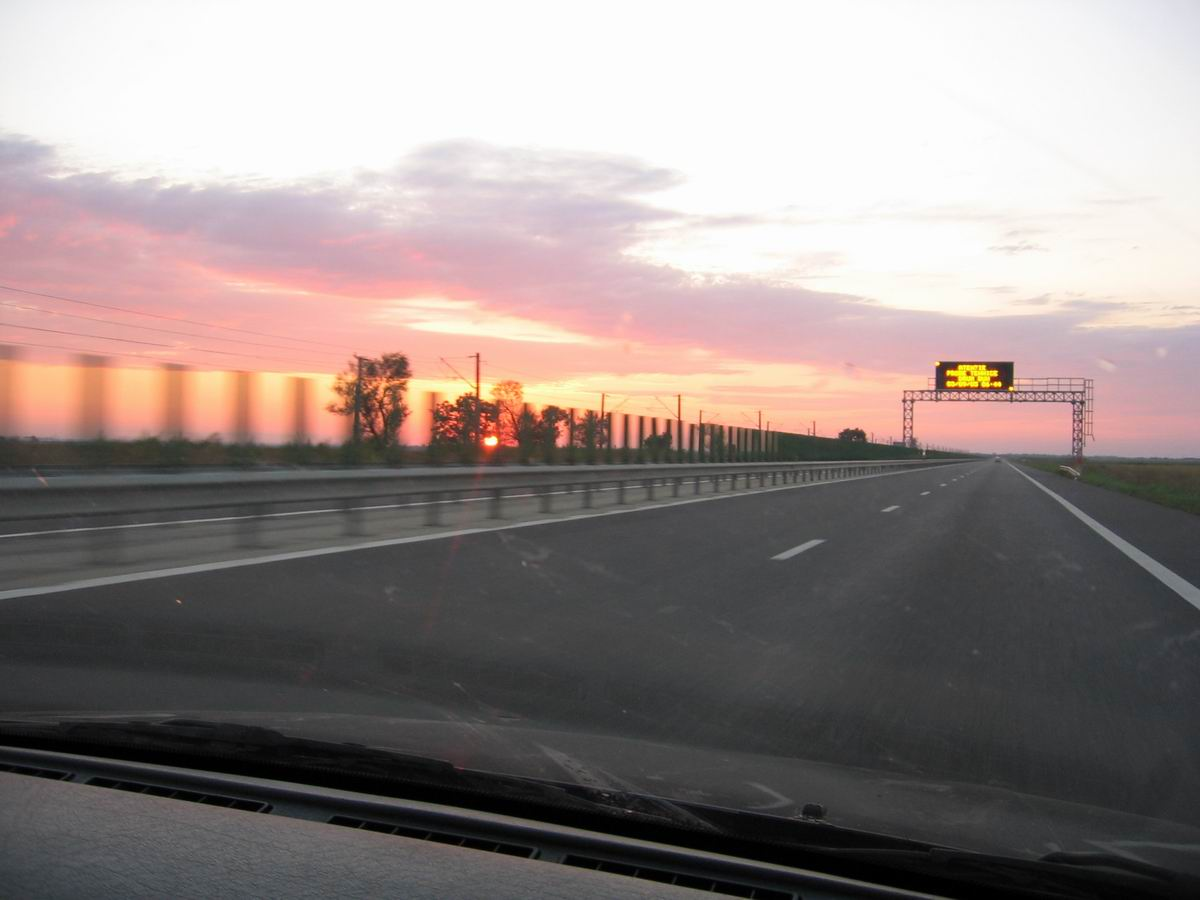
A2 motorway between Bucharest and Fetești

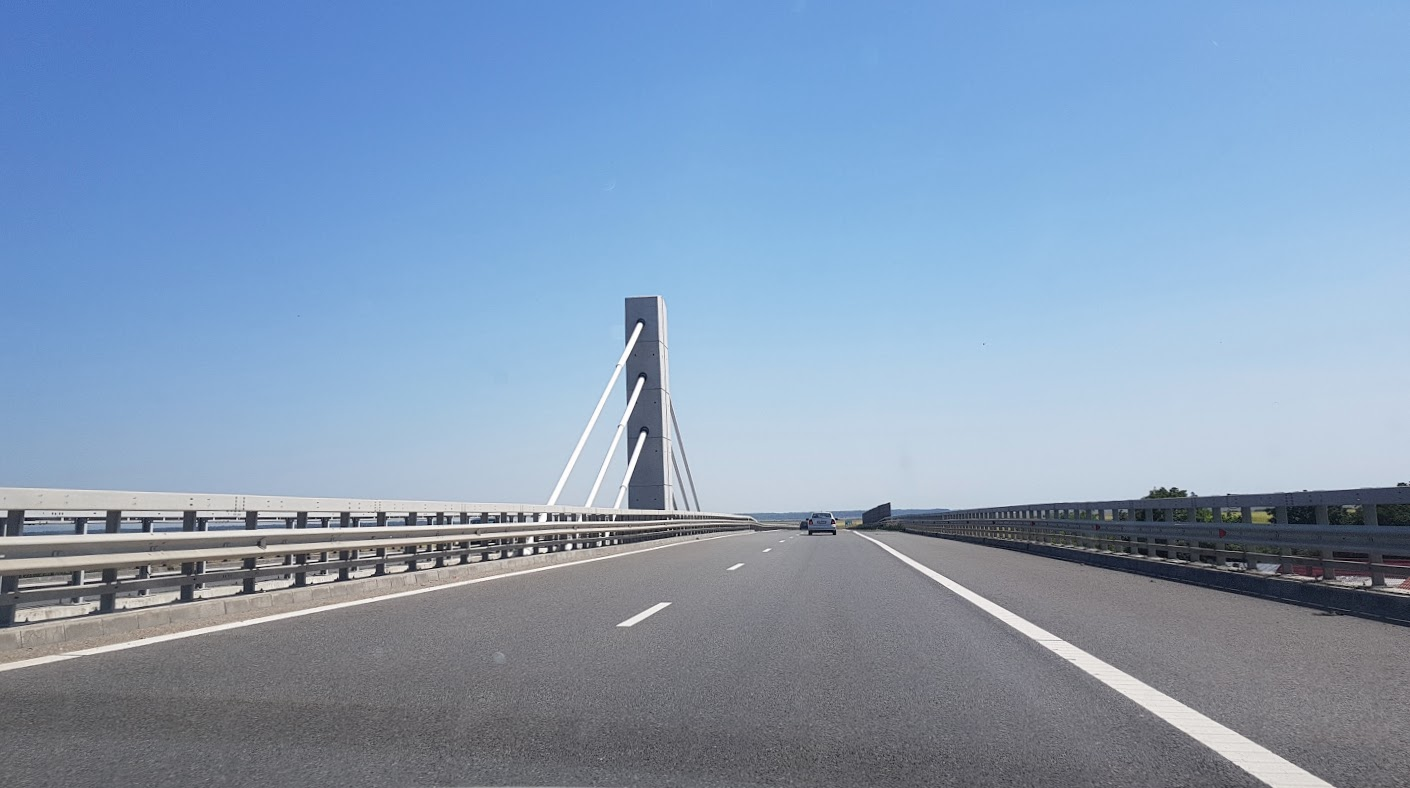
A3 motorway between Bucharest and Ploiești

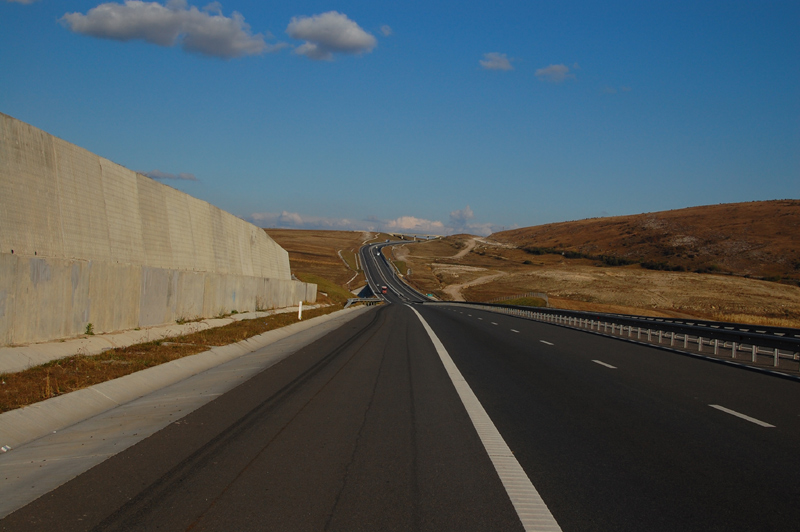
A3 motorway between Turda and Cluj

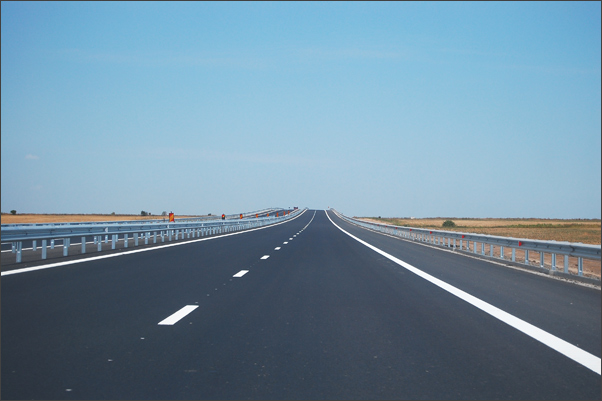
A4 motorway (Constanța bypass)

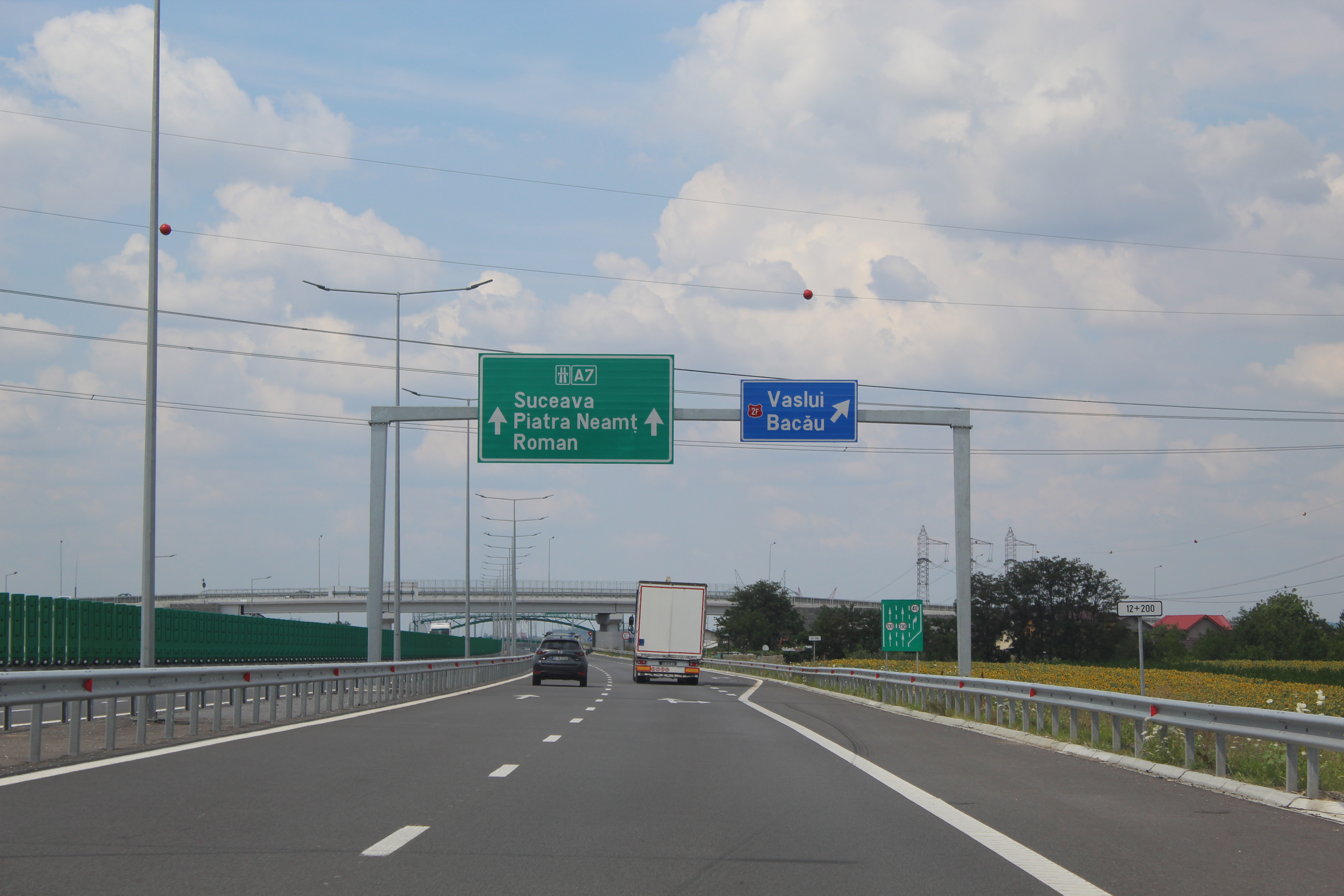
A7 motorway at Bacău bypass

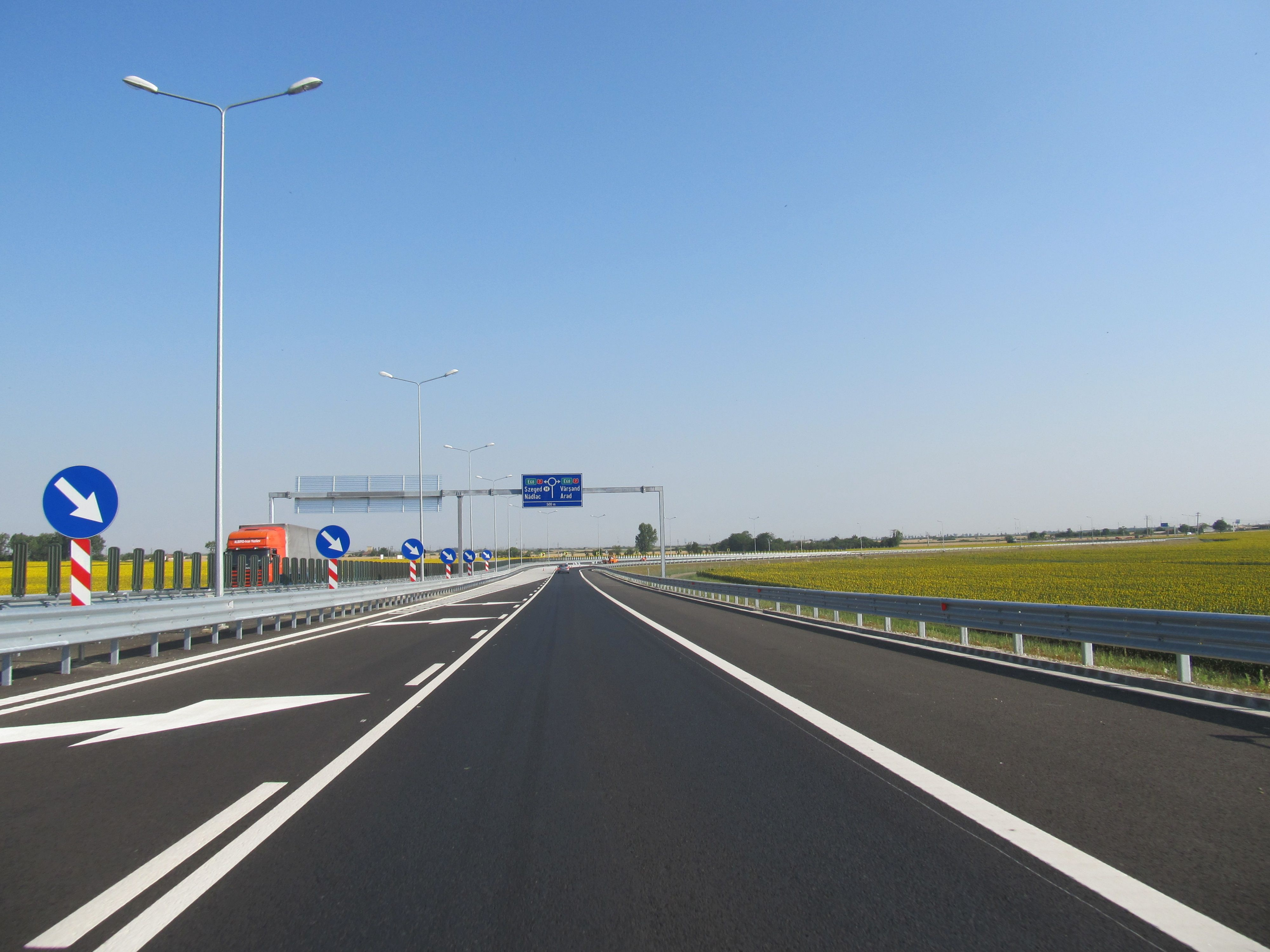
A11 motorway (Arad bypass)

== See also ==
- Transport in Romania
- Roads in Romania
- List of controlled-access highway systems
- Evolution of motorway construction in European nations
- European routes
