= Perișani (river) =

- Location within Romania

Location
- Country: Romania
- Counties: Galați County
- Villages: Smulți, Corni, Băleni

Physical characteristics
- Source
  - coordinates: 45°57′19″N 27°44′51″E
  - elevation: 237 m (778 ft)
- Mouth: Suhu
  - location: Băleni
  - coordinates: 45°48′54″N 27°48′49″E
  - elevation: 89 m (292 ft)
- Length: 16 km (9.9 mi)
- Basin size: 32 km^{2} (12 sq mi)

Basin features
- Progression: Suhu→ Geru→ Siret→ Danube→ Black Sea

The Perișani is a right tributary of the river Suhu in Romania. It flows into the Suhu near Băleni. The basin size of the 16 km (9.9 mi) long Perișani is 32 km^{2} (12 sq mi).
