= Suhu (river) =

Suhu Suhurlui
- Location within Romania

Location
- Country: Romania
- Counties: Galați County
- Villages: Corni, Băleni, Rediu, Pechea, Slobozia Conachi, Piscu

Physical characteristics
- Source
  - coordinates: 45°59′39″N 27°43′1″E
  - elevation: 216 m (709 ft)
- Mouth: Geru
  - location: Piscu
  - coordinates: 45°28′59″N 27°43′1″E
  - elevation: 10 m (33 ft)
- Length: 72 km (45 mi)
- Basin size: 373 km^{2} (144 sq mi)

Basin features
- Progression: Geru→ Siret→ Danube→ Black Sea
- River code: XII.1.81a.5

The Suhu is a left tributary of the river Geru in Romania. It flows into the Geru near Piscu. The basin size of the 72 km (45 mi) long Suhu is 373 km^{2} (144 sq mi). It is also known as Suhurlui, but the Suhurlui is also a right tributary of the Suhu. Before the regularization of the lower course of the Siret, it was a tributary of the Bârlădel, a branch of the Siret. After the embankment of the Siret plain, the upper course of the Bârladel became the lower reach of the Geru.

== Tributaries ==
The following rivers are tributaries to the river Suhu (from source to mouth):

- Left: Valea Vacii, Valea Satului
- Right: Suhurlui, Perișani, Valea Rea
