= Lozova (disambiguation) =

Lozova is a city in Kharkiv Oblast, Ukraine.

Lozova may also refer to:

- Lozova, Strășeni, a commune in Strășeni district, Moldova
- Lozova, a village in Braniștea Commune, Galați County, Romania
- Lozova (river), a river in Galați County, Romania
- Lozova, Ternopil Oblast, a village in western Ukraine
