= Negrea (Lozova) =

- Location within Romania

Location
- Country: Romania
- Counties: Galați County
- Villages: Negrea

Physical characteristics
- Mouth: Lozova
  - coordinates: 45.5162°N 27.8327°E
- Length: 17 km (11 mi)
- Basin size: 48 km^{2} (19 sq mi)

Basin features
- Progression: Lozova→ Bârlădel→ Siret→ Danube→ Black Sea
- River code: XII.1.83.4.1

The Negrea is a left tributary of the river Lozova in Romania. It flows into the Lozova in Schela. Its length is 17 km (11 mi) and its basin size is 48 km^{2} (19 sq mi).
