= Vameș =

Vameș may refer to:

- Vameș, a village in the Piscu commune of Romania
- Vameș, a tributary of the river Geru in Romania
