= Golog (disambiguation) =

Golog may refer to:

- Golog Tibetan Autonomous Prefecture in Qinghai Province
- Golog Maqin Airport
- Jigme Gyatso (AKA Golog Jigme), a Tibetan filmmaker
- GOLOG, a high-level logic programming language

== See also ==
- Gologan, a river in Romania
- Gologanu, a community in Romania
