= Bârlădel =

River in Romania

- Location within Romania

Location
- Country: Romania
- Counties: Galați County

Physical characteristics
- Mouth: Siret
  - coordinates: 45.4151°N 27.8726°E
  - elevation: 6 m (20 ft)
- Length: 17 km (11 mi)
- Basin size: 339 km^{2} (131 sq mi)

Basin features
- Progression: Siret→ Danube→ Black Sea
- Tributaries
  - left: Caina, Lozova, Valea lui Odobescu

The Bârlădel is a left tributary of the river Siret in Romania. It flows into the Siret near Șerbeștii Vechi. The basin size of the 17 km (11 mi) long Bârladel is 339 km^{2} (131 sq mi). Before the regularization of the lower course of the Siret, it was a branch of the Siret, collecting several left tributaries of the Siret, including the Geru and the Suhu. Since the regularization works, the Geru discharges directly into the Siret, and the remaining course of the Bârladel collects the left Siret tributaries to the east of the Geru and the Suhu. The Bârlădel flows through the villages Independența, Vasile Alecsandri, Braniștea and Traian.
