= Ciungi River =

Ciungi River may refer to:

- A tributary of the Trotuș in eastern Romania
- A tributary of the Gologan in Galați County, Romania

== See also ==
- Ciunga River, in Romania and Hungary
