= Lascăr Catargiu (disambiguation) =

Lascăr Catargiu may refer to:

- Lascăr Catargiu, Romanian politician
- Lascăr Catargiu, the former name of Schela, Galați, Romania
- Lascăr Catargiu, the former name of Plauru village, Ceatalchioi Commune, Tulcea County, Romania
- Lascăr Catargiu, the former name of Lunca Jiului village, later absorbed into Craiova, Dolj County, Romania
- Bulevardul Lascăr Catargiu, a street in Bucharest, Romania
