= Galați–Brăila Expressway =

Expressway under construction in Romania

Danube expressway DX6
- Drumul expres DX6

Route information
- Maintained by Compania Națională de Administrare a Infrastructurii Rutiere
- Length: 0 km (0 mi; 0 ft) 11 km planned

Major junctions
- From: Galați
- To: Brăila

Location
- Country: Romania

Highway system
- Roads in Romania; Highways

The Danube Expressway or Galați–Brăila Expressway (Romanian: Drumul expres Galați–Brăila) is an expressway under construction in the south-eastern part of Romania, that will probably be labelled as the DEx6. It will link the cities of Galați and Brăila, be 11 kilometres (6.8 mi) long and serve as an alternative to the existing two-lane DN22B (Romanian: Drumul Național 22B) road.

Under construction as of 2021, the expressway is being built by the Romanian company Spedition UMB with scheduled opening in 2026, costing 371 million lei. It is part of the series of major infrastructure projects planned within the proposed Danube metropolitan area, which includes a bridge over the Danube river in Brăila.

== Exit list ==
| County | Location | km | mi | Destinations | Notes |
|---|---|---|---|---|---|
| Galați | Galați | 0 | 0.0 | DN2B – Galați West, Șendreni | Northern terminus |
| Siret river | | 1 | 0.62 | Also spans over the Bărboși classification yard part of the CFR 704 line | |
Missing connection South towards Brăila
| Brăila | Vădeni | 11 | 6.8 | DN2S – Brăila North | Southern terminus |
1.000 mi = 1.609 km; 1.000 km = 0.621 mi: Unopened

== See also ==
- Roads in Romania
- Transport in Romania
