= Lozova (river) =

- Location within Romania

Location
- Country: Romania
- Counties: Galați County
- Villages: Schela, Braniștea

Physical characteristics
- Mouth: Bârlădel
  - coordinates: 45.4357°N 27.8274°E
- Length: 39 km (24 mi)
- Basin size: 233 km^{2} (90 sq mi)

Basin features
- Progression: Bârlădel→ Siret→ Danube→ Black Sea
- Tributaries
  - left: Negrea, Greaca
- River code: XII.1.83.4

The Lozova is a left tributary of the river Bârlădel in Romania. It flows into the Bârlădel in Braniștea. Its length is 39 km (24 mi) and its basin size is 233 km^{2} (90 sq mi).
