= Evolution of motorway construction in European Union member states =

Historical map of 1926 of the Autostrada dei Laghi ("Lakes Motorway"; now parts of the Autostrada A8 and the Autostrada A9) opened on 21 September 1924 in Italy, the first controlled-access highway ever built in the world.

The evolution of motorways construction in European Union member states by total number of kilometres existing in that year. This is a list of the total number of motorways by country, member of the European Union. It includes motorways (controlled-access highways), classified as such by the Eurostat.

== Members of the EU by total km of motorway built during the 20th century ==
Country	1921	1926	1935	1936	1937	1938	1939	1940	1941	1942	1943	1950	1952	1955	1956	1958	1960	1962	1965	1968	1970	1972	1975	1978	1980	1981	1983	1984	1985	1987	1990	1993	1994	1995	1998	1999	2000
Austria	0	0	0	0	0	0	0	0	16.8	16.8		0					0				0				0						1145						1633
Belgium	0	0	0	0	0	0	0	0	0	0	0	0	0	0	0	0	0	0	0	0	0	0	0	0	0			0	0	0	1666		0	0	0	0	1702
Bulgaria	0	0	0	0	0	0	0	0	0	0	0	0	0	0	0	0	0	0	0	0	0	0	0	10	10			120	152		273						324
Croatia	0	0	0	0	0	0	0	0	0	0	0	0	0	0	0	0	0	0	0	0	0	0	0	0	0	0		0	0	0	0	0	0	0	0	0	411
Czech Republic	0	0	0	0	0	0	0	0	0	20	0	0	0	0	0	0	0	0	0	0	0	0	0	0	0	0		0	0	0	357	0	0	0	0	0	499.4
Cyprus	0	0	0	0	0	0	0	0	0	20	0	0	0	0	0	0	0	0	0	0	0	0	0	0	0	0		0	0	0	0	154	0	0	0	0	240
Denmark	0	0	0	0	0	0	120			300	300	300	300	300	300	509			0												601						953
Estonia	0	0	0	0	0	0	0	0	0	0	0	0	0	0	0	0	0	0	0	0	0	0	0	0	0	0		0	0	0	41	0			93	93	96
Finland	0	0	0	0	0	0	0	0	0	0	0	0	0	0	0	0	0	0	0	0	0	0	0	0	0	0		0	0	0	225	0					549
France	0	0	0	0	0	0	0	0	0	0	0	0	0	0	0	0	0	0	0	0	0	0	0	0	0	0		0	0	0	6824	8500	0				9776
Germany	19	8.3	108	1086	1010	3046	3301	3737	3827	3861	3896	2128		2187		0		2551		3204	4110		5742		7292	0			8198	8822	10854			11143		11515	11712
Greece	0	0	0	0	0	0	0	0	0	0	0	0	0	0	0	0	0	0	0	0	0	0	0	0	0	0	0	0	0	0	190	0			346	416	553
Hungary	0	0	0	0	0	0	0	0	0	0	0	0	0	0	0	0	0	0	0	0	0	0	98		200	0					267	0			500		448
Ireland	0	0	0	0	0	0	0	0	0	0	0	0	0	0	0	0	0	0	0	0	0	0	0	0	0	0	8	8	8	8	26						103
Italy	0	58.2	58.2	58.2	58.2	58.2	400				0	0	0	0						0											6193					6478	6478
Lithuania	0	0	0	0	0	0	0	0	0	0	0	0	0	0	0	0	0	0	0	0	0	0	0	0	0	0	0	0	0	0	421						147
Luxembourg	0	0	0	0	0	0	0	0	0	0	0	0	0	0	0	0	0	0	0	0	0	0	0	0	0	0	0	0	0	0	78	0	114	115	126	146	147
Netherlands	0	0	0	0	0	0	0	0	0	0	0	0	0	0	0	0	0	0	0	0	0	0	0	0	0	0		0	0	0	2092					2265	2274
Poland	0	0	0	93	131	0	0	0	0	0	0	0	0	0	0	0	0	0	0	0	0	0	0	0	0	0	0	0	0	0	257	0	0	0	0	0	358
Portugal	0	0	0	0	0	0	0	0	0	0	0	0	0	0	0	0	0	0	0	0	0	0	0	0	0	0	0	0	0	0	316						1482
Romania	0	0	0	0	0	0	0	0	0	0	0	0	0	0	0	0	0	0	0	0	0	96	96	96	96	96	96	96	96	113	113	113	113	113	113	113	113
Slovakia	0	0	0	0	0	0	0	0	0	0	0	0	0	0	0	0	0	0	0	0	0	0	0	0	0	0	0	0	0	0	192						296
Slovenia	0	0	0	0	0	0	0	0	0	0	0	0	0	0	0	0	0	0	0	0	0	0	0	0	0	0	0	0	0	0	228						427
Spain	0	0	0	0	0	0	0	0	0	0	0	0	0	0	0	0	0	0	0	0	0	0	0	0	0	0	0	0	0	0	4693						9049
Sweden	0	0	0	0	0	0	0	0	0	0	0	0	0	0	0	0	0	0	0	0	0	0	0	0	0	721					939						1499
United Kingdom	0	0	0	0	0	0	0	0	0	0	0	0	0	0	0	13.28	0	0	0	311	0	0	0	0	0	0	0	0	0	0	0	0	0	0	0	0	0

- Note: The table above is missing these European countries due to the lack of kilometres built in the 20th century: Latvia and Malta.

== Members of the EU by total km of motorway built during the 21st century ==
Country	2001	2002	2003	2004	2005	2006	2007	2008	2009	2010	2011	2012	2013	2014	2015
Austria	1,645	1,645	1,670	1,677	1,678	1,696	1,696	1,696	1,719	1,719	1,719				
Belgium	1727	1729	1729	1747	1747	1763	1763	1763	1763	1763	1763	1763	1763		
Bulgaria	328	328	328	331	331	394	418	418	418	437	458	541	620	625	
Croatia	429	613	754	925	1,016	1,081	1,156	1,199	1,244	1,244	1,250.7	1254	1254	1270.2	
Cyprus	257	268	268	268	276	257	257	257	257	257	257	257			
Czech Republic	517.6	517.7	518	546	564	633	657	691	729	734	745	751	763	775	
Denmark	971	1010	1010	1010	1010	1071	1111	1128	1128	1128	1128	1241		1254	
Estonia	93	98	98	96	99	99	96	104	100	115	115	124	124	124	
Finland	591	603	653	653	693	700	700	739	765	779	780	780		863	
France	10,068	10,223	10,379	10,486	10,800	10,848	10,958	11,042	11,163	11,392	11,412	11,465		11,882	
Germany	11,786	12,037	12,044	12,174	12,363	12,531	12,594	12,645	12,813	12,819	12,845	12,845	12,879	12,879	
Greece	670	845	849	866	1062	1233	1364	1569	1744	1744			1879	2250	
Hungary	448	533	542	569	636	785	858	1,273.7	1,274	1,477	1,515.5	1,515.1			
Ireland	125	125	176.33	191.71	246.62	269.63	394	423	663	900.27	900	900	1015	1017	1052
Italy	6,478	6,487	6,487	6,532	6,542	6,554	6,588	6,629	6,661	6,668	6,668				
Lithuania	417	417.1	417	417	417	309	309	309	309	309	309			349	
Luxembourg	115	126	147	146	147	147	147	147	152						
Netherlands	2,499	2,516	2,542	2,585	2,600	2,604	2,582	2,637	2,631				2,758		
Poland	630	639	727	781	848	1,013	1,083	1,282	1,454	1,560	1,865	2,495	2,805	3,100	3,131
Portugal	1,659	1,835				2,545	2,613	2,673	2,705	2,737	2,737	2,988	3,080		
Romania	113	113	113	228	228	228	281	281	321	332	390	530	636	686	733
Slovakia	296.4	301.6	312.8	316.2	327.5	327.5	364.5	384	391	415.7	419.2	419.2		432	
Slovenia	435	456	477	483	569	579	579	696	747	771	768	769			
Spain	9,571	9,739	10,296	10,747	11,432	12,073	13,013	13,518	14,021	14,262	14,531	14,701	16024	16204	
Sweden	1,507	1,544	1,591	1,684	1,677	1,744	1,806	1,855	1,891				1,920		
United Kingdom	3,610	3,611	3,611	3,657	3,629	3,665	3,669	3,673	3,673.9	3,674	3,685.7				

- Note: Due to the new European standards in 2011 some European countries had their total number of motorways diminished, examples being Lithuania from 417 km to 309 km, or Estonia 115 km to 0. They became either dual carriageways or national highways.

== See also ==
- List of highest paved roads in Europe by country
  - List of highest paved roads in Switzerland
- Highway systems by country
- Principal passes of the Alps
- Transport in Europe
- List of highest railways in Europe
- List of countries by road network size
- History of roads in Ireland#Motorways in the Republic of Ireland

== See also ==
- Evolution of motorway construction in European nations
