= Smârdan, Galați =

Smârdan
- Commune
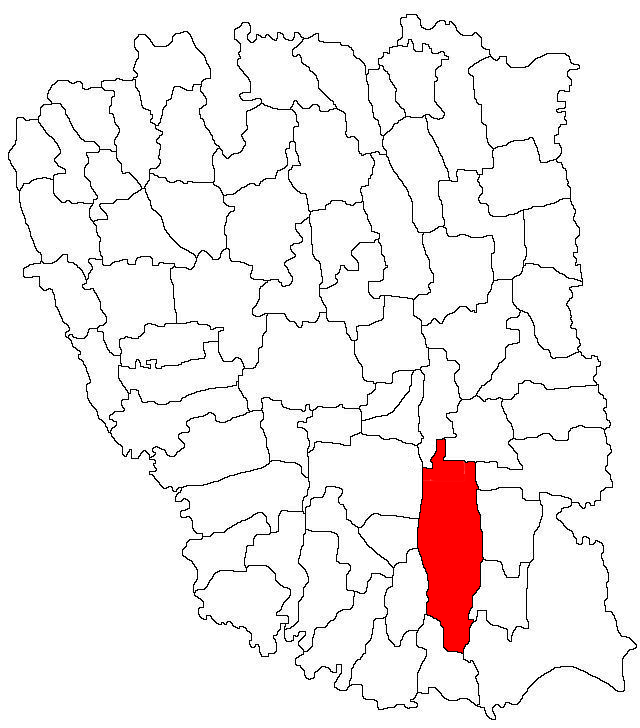
- Location in Galați County

- Location in Romania
- Coordinates: 45.5401°N 27.9204°E
- Country: Romania
- County: Galați

Government
  - Mayor (2020–2024): Silviu Zinica (USR)
- Area: 131.57 km^{2} (50.80 sq mi)
- Elevation: 16 m (52 ft)
- Population (2021-12-01): 5,342
  - Density: 41/km^{2} (110/sq mi)
- Time zone: EET/EEST (UTC+2/+3)
- Postal code: 807275
- Area code: +40 236
- Vehicle reg.: GL
- Website: www.primariasmardan.ro

Smârdan is a commune in Galați County, Western Moldavia, Romania with a population of 5,342 as of 2021. It is composed of three villages: Cișmele, Mihail Kogălniceanu, and Smârdan.

The commune is located in the southern part of the county, 8 km (5 mi) northeast of the county seat, Galați, and part of the proposed Lower Danube metropolitan area.

The Smârdan Training Area, covering an area of almost 10,000 ha (100 km^{2}; 39 sq mi), is located on the territory of the commune. Established in 1951 and modernized in recent year, the facility has become a strategic point for the training of NATO troops. The training area unit is subordinated to the Cincu Training Center located in Cincu.
