= Geru (river) =

River in Romania

- Location within Romania

Location
- Country: Romania
- Counties: Galați County

Physical characteristics
- Source: Brătulești Hill
  - coordinates: 45°56′4″N 27°45′41″E
  - elevation: 227 m (745 ft)
- Mouth: Siret
  - location: Independența
  - coordinates: 45.4484°N 27.7514°E
  - elevation: 6 m (20 ft)
- Length: 62 km (39 mi)
- Basin size: 755 km^{2} (292 sq mi)

Basin features
- Progression: Siret→ Danube→ Black Sea
- Tributaries
  - left: Gerusița, Gologan, Vameș, Suhu

The Geru (Romanian pronunciation: [ˈd͡ʒeru]) is a left tributary of the river Siret in Romania. It discharges into the Siret near Independența. Its length is 62 km (39 mi) and its basin size is 755 km^{2} (292 sq mi). Before the regularization of the lower course of the Siret, it was a tributary of the Bârlădel, a secondary branch of the Siret. Since the regularization works, the Geru discharges directly into the Siret, and the remaining course of the Bârladel collects the left Siret tributaries to the east of the Geru and the Suhu. The Geru flows through the villages Mândrești, Valea Mărului, Cudalbi, Costache Negri, Tudor Vladimirescu, Vameș, Piscu and Independența.
