= Speed limits in Romania =

Speed Limits in Romania

The speed limit in localities is set at 50 km/h, but the owner of the road (usually the state) can apply for permission from traffic police to raise it up to 80 km/h for automobiles and motorcycles or decrease it as low as 10 km/h for tramways and 30 km/h for automobiles. It is because of this that some city boulevards have a speed limit of 60 km/h, and some National Road stretches that pass through villages have a speed limit of 70 km/h.

Out of localities, the speed limits for categories A and B (motorcycles and automobiles) are: 130 km/h on motorways, 120 km/h on expressways, 100 km/h on national roads designated as European roads such as E60 (DN1), 90km/h on other roads. For categories C, D, and D1 (trucks and buses), the limits are: 110 km/h on motorways, 100 km/h on expressways, 90 km/h on national roads designated as European roads, 80km/h on other roads, and for categories A1, B1, and C1 (low weight/power motorcycles and automobiles) they are: 90 km/h on motorways, 85 km/h on expressways, 80 km/h on national roads designated as European roads, 70km/h on other roads. Tractors and mopeds have a maximum speed limit of 45 km/h both in and out of localities, and are not allowed on motorways or expressways. Any vehicle that can't reach a speed of 50 km/h can't use the motorways or expressways, including tractors.

Vehicles with trailers or semis must travel at 10 km/h less than the speed limit for their category, when out of localities (for example, a car with a trailer will have a speed limit 50 km/h in the localities, but only 80 km/h on regular roads, 90 km/h on European roads, 100 km/h on expressways and 120 km/h on a motorways). Overweight automobiles, trucks and buses or those transporting oversized or dangerous products (ADR) have a speed limit of 40 km/h in localities and 70 km/h out of localities, whereas vehicles towing a damaged vehicle are 30 and 50 respectively, except on motorways and expressways where the speed limit is 70 km/h. Also, drivers with less than one year of experience or learning how to drive must travel at 20 km/h less than the speed limit for their category, when out of localities.

No legal sanction is established for driving within 9 km/h over the speed limit.

As of February 2019, the fines for surpassing the speed limits are:

- Class I - 2 to 3 fine-points for 10–20 km/h over the limit
- Class II - 4 to 5 fine-points for 21–30 km/h over the limit
- Class III - 6 to 8 fine-points for 31–40 km/h over the limit
- Class IV - 9 to 20 fine-points for 41–50 km/h over the limit
- Class IV - 9 to 20 fine-points for more than 50 km/h over the limit. Also, in this case, the license is suspended for 90 days.
- Class IV - 9 to 20 fine-points for more than 70 km/h over the limit. Also, in this case, the license is suspended for 120 days.
- Class V - 21 to 100 fine-points is reserved only for legal persons. They apply for things like not properly signposting a road or railway crossing, instituting traffic restrictions without having the right to do so or failing to maintain a road during winter.

Where a fine-point is calculated as 10% of the minimum economy wage in Romania. In 2023, the fine-point was 145 RON.
