= Gologan =

- Location within Romania

Location
- Country: Romania
- Counties: Galați County
- Villages: Măcișeni, Costache Negri

Physical characteristics
- Source: near Măcișeni
  - coordinates: 45°53′54″N 27°45′05″E
  - elevation: 220 m (720 ft)
- Mouth: Geru
  - location: Costache Negri
  - coordinates: 45°41′33″N 27°41′55″E
  - elevation: 42 m (138 ft)
- Length: 28 km (17 mi)
- Basin size: 71 km^{2} (27 sq mi)

Basin features
- Progression: Geru→ Siret→ Danube→ Black Sea
- Tributaries
  - right: Ciungi
- River code: XII.1.81a.3

The Gologan is a left tributary of the river Geru in Romania. It flows into the Geru in Costache Negri. Its length is 28 km (17 mi) and its basin size is 71 km^{2} (27 sq mi).
