= Evolution of motorway construction in European nations =

Historical map of 1926 of the Autostrada dei Laghi ("Lakes Motorway"; now parts of the Autostrada A8 and the Autostrada A9) opened on 21 September 1924 in Italy, the first controlled-access highway ever built in the world.

The evolution of motorways construction in European countries by total number of kilometers existing in that year. This is a list of the total number of Motorways by country in Europe. It includes motorways (controlled-access highways), classified as such by the Eurostat and includes countries that are not members of the European Union but geographically are situated in Europe.

== Countries by motorways built before 1952 ==
Country	1924	1932	1935	1936	1937	1938	1939	1940	1941	1942	1943	1944	1945	1950	1952
Austria	0	0	0	0	0	0	0	0	16.8	16.8	16.8	16.8	16.8	-	16.8
Belgium	0	0	0	0	110	-	-	-	-	-	-	-	-	-	50
Czech Republic	0	0	0	0	0	0	0	0	0	20	-	-	-	-	0
Cyprus	0	0	0	0	0	0	0	0	0	20	-	-	-	-	
Denmark	0	0	0	0	0	0	120	-	-	300	300	300	300	300	300
Germany	0	18	108	1086	1010	3046	3301	3737	3827	3861	3896	-	-	2128	-
Italy	58.2	58.2	58.2	58.2	58.2	58.2	400	-	-	-	-	-	-	-	-
Poland	0	0	0	93	131	131	131	131	131	131	131	133	133	133	133
Portugal	0	0	0	0	0	0	0	0	0	0	0	8	8	8	8

== Countries by motorways built between 1955 and 1970 ==
Country	1955	1956	1958	1959	1960	1961	1962	1963	1964	1965	1966	1967	1968	1969	1970
Austria	16.8	16.8	16.8	16.8	16.8	16.8	16.8	16.8	16.8	16.8	16.8	16.8	16.8	16.8	16.8
Belgium	80	100	150	-	200	-	300	-	-	400	-	-	-	-	570
Denmark	300	300	509	-	-		-	-	-	-	-	-	-	-	-
France	0	14.2	70.4	106	-	168.5	-	218.3	-	-	246.4	-	-	-	
Germany	2187	-	-	-	2551	-	-	-	-	3204	-	-	-	-	4110
Hungary	0	0	0	0	0	0	0	0	0	0	7	-	-	-	-
Poland	133	133	133	133	133	133	133	133	133	133	133	133	133	133	133
Portugal	8	8	8	8	11.6	-	36.6	-	-	44	-	-	-	-	59.1
Russia	0	0	0	0	0	0	-	108.9	-	-	108.9	-	-	-	
Switzerland	0	0	0	0	0	0	-	8	-	-	-	-	-	-	-
United Kingdom	0	0	0	13	153	219	243	322	480	566	629	761	884	964	1057

== Countries by motorways built between 1971 and 1985 ==
Country	1971	1972	1973	1974	1975	1976	1977	1978	1979	1980	1981	1982	1983	1984	1985
Austria	-	292	-	-	-	-	-	-	-	-	-	-	-	-	-
Belgium	-	848	-	-	956	956	1130	1130	1137	1137	1152	-	-	1395	-
Bulgaria	0	0	0	0	0	10	10	-	-	120	152	-	-	-	-
Croatia	-	39.3	-	-	39.3	39.3	39.3	39.3	246	246	246	246	-	-	-
Czech Republic	21.3	29.1	48.6	48.6	64.7	81.7	135.4	166.5	194.4	257.7	257.7	270.6	281.1	305.3	314.8
Germany	-	-	-	-	5742	-	7292	-	-	-	-	-	-	-	-
Hungary	85	-	107	-	136	136	168	182	184	213	213	230	245	245	302
Ireland	0	0	0	0	0	0	0	0	0	0	0	0	10	10	15
Italy	-	-	-	-	-	-	-	-	-	-	-	-	-	-	-
North Macedonia	0	0	0	0	0	0	0	0	0	23	23	23	23	23	42
Poland	-	133	133	133	133	133	169	169	190	190	190	190	255	278	321
Portugal	59.1														
Romania	0	0	96	96	96	96	96	96	96	96	96	96	96	96	96
Russia	108.9	180.9	108.9	108.9	108.9	108.9	108.9	108.9	108.9	108.9	108.9	108.9	108.9	108.9	108.9
Serbia	0	0	0	0	0	0	355	355	355	355	355	355	355	355	355
Slovakia	0	0	29.3	29.3	46.1	53.3	67.6	115.6	115.6	115.6	115.6	142.7	150.1	150.1	165.2
Slovenia	0	32	32	32	32	0	0	0	0	0	0	0	-	-	-
Spain	-	-	-	-	-	-	-	-	-	-	-	-	-	-	-
Sweden	-	-	-	-	-	-	-	721	-	-	-	-	-	-	-
Switzerland	-	-	-	-	-	-	-	-	-	-	-	-	-	-	-
United Kingdom	1270	1669	1730	1869	1975	2155	2237	2394	2455	2556	2647	2692	2741	2786	2813

== Countries by motorways built between 1986 and 2000 ==
Country	1986	1987	1988	1989	1990	1991	1992	1993	1994	1995	1996	1997	1998	1999	2000
Austria	-	-	-	-	1145	-	-	-	-	-	-	-	-	-	1633
Belgium	-	-	-	1613	1666	-	-	-	-	-	-	-	-	-	1702
Bulgaria	-	-		-	273	-	-	-	-	-	-	-	-	-	324
Croatia	-	-	-	-	-	-	-	-	-	-	-	-	-	-	411
Czech Republic	317.4	317.4	326.4	335.4	355.7	365.1	368.7	391.5	392.3	416.7	425.6	488.2	500.9	500.9	500.9
Cyprus	0	0	0	0	-	154	-	-	-	-	-	-	-	-	240
Denmark	-	-	-	-	601	-	-	-	-	-	-	-	-	-	953
Estonia	-	-	-	-	41	-	-	-	-	-	-	-	93	93	96
Finland	0	0	0		225	-	-	-	-	-	-	-	-	-	549
France	-	-	-	-	6824	8500	-	-	-	-	-	-	-	-	9776
Germany	-	-	8198	8822	10854	-	-	-	-	-	-	11143	-	11515	11712
Greece	0	0	0	0	190	-	-	-	-	-	-	-	346	416	553
Hungary	310	310	316	346	361	361	361	361	398	398	440	456	533	571	571
Ireland	-	-	-	-	26	-	-	-	-	-	-	-	-	-	103
Italy	-	-	-	-	6193	-	-	-	-	-	-	-	-	6478	6478
Lithuania	-	-	-	-	421	-	-	-	-	-	-	-	-	-	147
Luxembourg	0	0	0	0	78	-	-	-	-	-	114	115	126	146	147
Netherlands	-	-	-	-	2092	-	-	-	-	-	-	-	-	2265	2274
North Macedonia	42	70	70	70	70	90	90	90	90	105	105	120	120	145	145
Norway	0	0	0	0	0	0	0	0	0	0	0	0	0	0	143
Poland	327	327	348	366	381	399	399	403	405	440	453	456	490	502	592
Portugal	-	-	-	-	316	-	-	-	-	-	-	-	-	-	1482
Romania	96	113	113	113	113	113	113	113	113	113	113	113	113	113	113
Russia	108.9	108.9	108.9	108.9	108.9	108.9	108.9	108.9	108.9	108.9	108.9	108.9	108.9	108.9	-
Serbia	355	355	355	355		355	355	355	355	355	355	355	355	355	33
Slovakia	173.1	173.1	191.9	191.9	195.4	197.4	197.4	197.4	197.4	197.4	216.1	219.2	288.6	290.6	290.6
Slovenia	-	-	-	-	228	-	-	-	-	-	-	-	-	-	427
Spain	0	0	0	0	4693	-	-	-	-	-	-	-	-	-	9049
Sweden	-	-	-	-	939	-	-	-	-	-	-	-	-	-	1499
Switzerland	-	-	-	-	-	-	-	-	-	-	-	-	-	-	1270
Turkey	-	-	-	-	-	-	-	-	-	-	-	-	-	-	1674
United Kingdom	2920	2975	2992	2995	3070	3102	3133	3211	3242	3269	3298	3378	3421	3449	3467

== Countries by motorways built between 2001 and 2015 ==
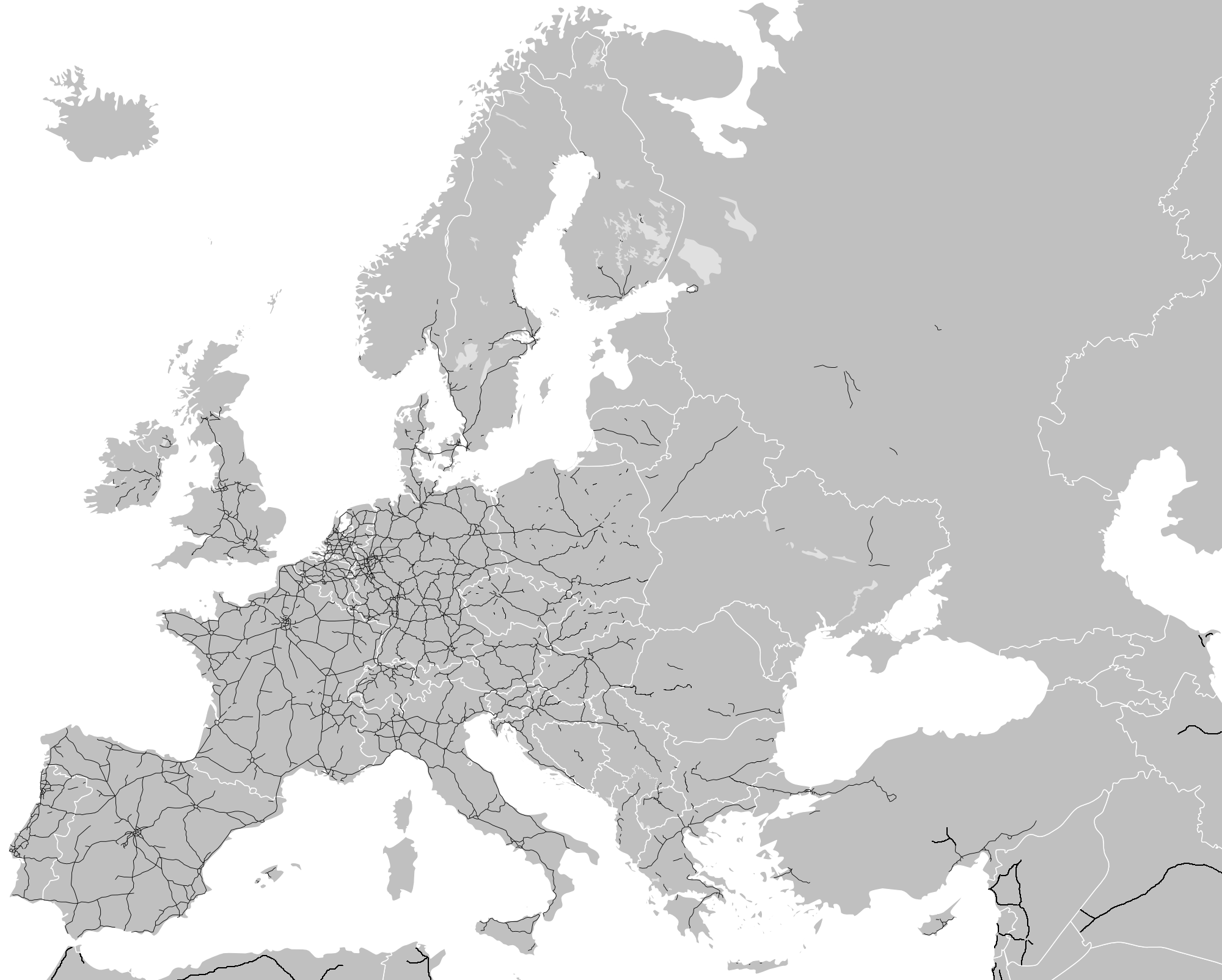
Motorway construction in European nations by 2012

Rank	Country	2001	2002	2003	2004	2005	2006	2007	2008	2009	2010	2011	2012	2013	2014	2015
1	Spain	9,571	9,739	10,296	10,747	11,432	12,073	13,013	13,518	14,021	14,262	14,531	14,701	14,981	15,049	15,336
2	Germany	11,786	12,037	12,044	12,174	12,363	12,531	12,594	12,645	12,813	12,819	12,845	12,879	12,917	12,949	12,993
3	France	10,068	10,223	10,379	10,486	10,800	10,848	10,958	11,042	11,163	11,392	11,413	11,413	11,552	11,560	11,599
4	Italy	6,478	6,487	6,487	6,532	6,542	6,554	6,588	6,629	6,661	6,668	6,668	6,726	6,751	6,844	-
5	United Kingdom	3,519	3,610	3,611	3,657	3,629	3,665	3,669	3,673	3,673	3,673	3,685.7	3,732.5	3,756	3,759.6	3,768.4
6	Poland	630	639	727	781	848	1,013	1,083	1,282	1,454	1,560	1,865	2,495	2,805	3,100	3,131
7	Turkey	1,696	1,714	1,753	1,862	1,867	1,908	1,908	1,922	2,036	2,080	2,119	2,127	2,244	2,278	2,282
8	Portugal	1,659	1,835	-	-	-	2,545	2,613	2,673	2,705	2,737	2,737	2,988	3,035	3,065	3,080
9	Netherlands	2,499	2,516	2,542	2,585	2,600	2,604	2,582	2,637	2,631	2,631	2,631	2,658	2,666	2,678	2,730
10	Greece	670	845	849	866	1,062	1,233	1,364	1,569	1,744	1,744	1,744	1,744	1,879	2,250	-
11	Sweden	1,507	1,544	1,591	1,684	1,677	1,744	1,836	1,857	1,923	1,971	1,957	2,004	2,044	2,088	2,119
12	Belgium	1,727	1,729	1,729	1,747	1,747	1,763	1,763	1,763	1,763	1,763	1,763	1,763	1,763	-	-
13	Austria	1,645	1,645	1,670	1,677	1,677	1,678	1,696	1,696	1,696	1,719	1,719	1,719	1,719	1,719	1,719
14	Hungary	571	638	667	717	803	967	1,037	1,113	1,118	1,290	1,321	1,321	1,361	1,382.1	1,447.3
15	Russia	132.9	-	-	-	-	-	-	-	-	-	1,000	1,060.5	1,060.5	1,060.5	-
16	Switzerland	1,305	1,341	1,341	1,341	1,358	1,361	1,383	1,383	1406	1,406	1,415	1,419	1,429	-	-
17	Denmark	971	1,010	1,010	1,010	1,010	1,071	1,111	1,128	1,143				1,216	1,232	1,237
18	Croatia	429	613	754	925	1,016	1,081	1,156	1,199	1,244	1,244	1,254	1254	1,289	1,290	1,310
19	Czech Republic	518.1	518.1	526.4	541.5	558.5	627.2	657	691	729	734	745	751	776	776	776
20	Belarus	-	-	-	-	-	-	-	-	-	-	-	845	845	903	1021
21	Romania	113	113	113	228	228	228	281	281	321	332	350	550	644	683	733
22	Finland	591	603	653	653	693	700	700	739	765	779	790	780	810	881	881
23	Serbia	55.5	88.7	108.7	113.3	-	201.3	207.3	207.3	236.3	628	633	498	498	-	-
24	Ireland	125	125	177	192	247	270	270	423	663	900	900	900	897	897	916
25	Bulgaria	328	328	328	331	331	394	418	418	418	437	458	541	605	610	-
26	Slovenia	435	456	477	483	569	579	579	696	747	768	768	769	769	770	773
27	Norway	143	173	-	193	264	271	239	253	344	381	393	393	407	514	-
28	Slovakia	290.6	297.1	307.8	314.6	326.5	326.5	363.7	381.6	389.6	414.8	417.8	417.8	417.8	417.8	463
29	Lithuania	309	309	309	309	309	309	309	309	309	309	309	309	309	309	309
30	Ukraine	0	0	0	0	0	0	0	0	0	0	17	200	280	317	-
31	North Macedonia	145	208	208	208	216	216	221	237	242	251	251	251	251	251	251
32	Cyprus	257	257	257	257	257	257	257	257	257	257	257	257	257	257	257
33	Bosnia and Herzegovina	0	0	11.5	11.5	11.5	20	27.6	27.6	37	42.7	69.2	80.6	81.8	126.1	129.6
34	Luxembourg	115	126	147	147	147	147	147	147	152	152	152	152	152	152	157
35	Estonia	93	96	98	99	100	104	115	124	-	-	-	-	-	-	-
36	Albania	-	-	-	-	-	-	-	-	25	86.5	86.5	86.5	86.5	86.5	152.5
37	Azerbaijan	-	-	-	-	-	-	-	-	-	-	-	-	-	-	148
38	Kosovo	0	0	0	0	0	0	0	0	0	0	0	0	36	76	80
39	Georgia	0	0	0	0	0	0	0	0	0	13	69	69	75	75	90
40	Armenia	0	0	0	0	0	0	0	0	0	0	0	-	-	-	88
41	Iceland	11	11	11	11	11	8	8	8	0	0	0	0	0	0	0
42	Andorra	0	0	0	0	0	0	0	0	0	0	0	0	0	0	0
43	Latvia	0	0	0	0	0	0	0	0	0	0	0	0	0	0	0
44	Liechtenstein	0	0	0	0	0	0	0	0	0	0	0	0	0	0	0
45	Malta	0	0	0	0	0	0	0	0	0	0	0	0	0	0	0
46	Moldova	0	0	0	0	0	0	0	0	0	0	0	0	0	0	0
47	Monaco	0	0	0	0	0	0	0	0	0	0	0	0	0	0	0
48	Montenegro	0	0	0	0	0	0	0	0	0	0	0	0	0	0	0
49	San Marino	0	0	0	0	0	0	0	0	0	0	0	0	0	0	0
50	Vatican City	0	0	0	0	0	0	0	0	0	0	0	0	0	0	0

* Note: Due to the new European standards in 2011 some European countries had their total number of motorways diminished. Examples being Iceland form 11 to 0, or Estonia 115 to 0, they became either expressways or national highways.
** Note: This table includes countries that are geographically situated in Asia but are integrated into the European Road System (example E80 in Turkey): Armenia, Azerbaijan, Georgia and Turkey.

== Countries by motorways built between 2016 and 2026 ==
Rank	Country	2016	2017	2018	2019	2020	2021	2022	2023	2024	2025	2026
1	Spain	-	15,523	15,585	17,228	17,228	17,228	17,228	17,228	17,228	17,228	17,228
2	Germany	-	13,009	13,141	13,141	13,141	13,183	13,183	13,183	13,183	13,183	13,183
3	France	-	11,618	11,671	11,671	11,671	11,671	11,671	11,671	11,671	11,671	11,671
4	Italy	-	6,943	-	6,943	6,943	6,943	6,943	6,943	6,943	6,943	6,943
5	Poland	3,252	3,510	3,811	4,214	4,340	4,690	4,935	5,075	5,206	5,465	5,585
6	United Kingdom	3,764	3,803	3,838	3,838	3,838	3,838	3,838	3,838	3,838	3,838	3,838
7	Turkey	-	2,657	2,842	3,060	3,523	3,532	3,633	3,726	3,796	3,796	3,796
8	Portugal	-	3,065	3,065	3,065	3,065	3,065	3,065	3,065	3,065	3,065	3,065
9	Netherlands	2,758	2,758	2,756	2,756	2,756	2,756	2,756	2,756	2,756	2,756	2,756
10	Greece	-	2,503	2,503	2,503	2,503	2,503	2,503	2,503	2,503	2,503	2,503
11	Sweden	2,118	2,132	2,132	2,132	2,132	2,132	2,132	2,132	2,132	2,132	2,132
12	Hungary	1,432	1,442	1,479	1,593	1,745	1,845	1,875	1,875	1,897	1,938	1,973
13	Belgium	1,763	1,763	1,763	1,763	1,763	1,763	1,763	1,763	1,763	1,763	1,763
14	Austria	1,719	1,743	1,743	1,743	1,743	1,743	1,743	1,743	1,743	1,743	1,743
15	Denmark	1,255	1,308	1,329	1,329	1,329	1,329	1,329	1,609	1,660	1,660	1,660
16	Russia	1,442	1,442	1,442	1,442	1,638	1,638	1,638	1,638	1,638	1,638	1,638
17	Czech Republic	1,223	1,240	1,252	1,306	1,306	1,349	1,349	1,349	1,487	1,556	1,556
18	Switzerland	1,458	1,458	1,462	1,462	1,462	1,462	1,462	1,462	1,549	1,549	1,549
19	Romania	733	763	823	850	910	940	995	1,074	1,276	1,418	1,487
20	Croatia	1,310	1,310	1,310	1,310	1,310	1,310	1,341	1,341	1,341	1,341	1,341
21	Serbia	-	-	-	-	924	933	961	996	996	1,048	1,048
22	Belarus	1,021	1,021	1,021	1,021	1,021	1,021	1,021	1,021	1,021	1,021	1,021
23	Ireland	916	916	916	916	916	916	916	916	995	995	995
24	Finland	890	893	926	926	926	926	926	926	926	926	926
25	Bulgaria	-	734	757	812	831	831	845	879	879	906	911
26	Slovakia	463	482	482	498	498	498	854	854	854	854	976
27	Norway	-	523	599	599	599	599	770	770	770	770	770
28	Slovenia	-	618	623	623	623	623	625	639	639	639	639
29	Lithuania	314	324	324	324	324	324	431	431	431	431	431
30	North Macedonia	-	259	287	317	317	317	335	335	335	335	335
31	Ukraine	-	-	-	-	-	317	317	317	317	317	317
32	Bosnia and Herzegovina	166	188	215	-	222	231	243	243	254	263	283
33	Cyprus	257	257	257	257	257	257	257	257	257	257	257
34	Kosovo	76	80	80	109	119	140	189	237	237	237	237
35	Estonia	154	154	154	154	154	154	154	154	226	226	226
36	Albania	86	152	152	152	152	152	191	191	191	191	191
37	Luxembourg	152	157	-	165	165	165	165	165	165	165	165
38	Azerbaijan	-	-	148	148	148	148	148	148	148	148	148
39	Georgia	75	75	90	90	90	90	90	90	90	90	90
40	Armenia	88	88	88	88	88	88	88	88	88	88	88
41	Latvia	0	0	0	0	0	0	0	11	66	66	66
42	Montenegro	0	0	0	0	0	0	41	41	41	41	41
43	Iceland	0	0	0	0	0	0	0	0	0	0	0
44	Andorra	0	0	0	0	0	0	0	0	0	0	0
45	Liechtenstein	0	0	0	0	0	0	0	0	0	0	0
46	Malta	0	0	0	0	0	0	0	0	0	0	0
47	Moldova	0	0	0	0	0	0	0	0	0	0	0
48	Monaco	0	0	0	0	0	0	0	0	0	0	0
49	San Marino	0	0	0	0	0	0	0	0	0	0	0
50	Vatican City	0	0	0	0	0	0	0	0	0	0	0

== See also ==
- Evolution of motorway construction in European Union member states
- Highway systems by country
- List of controlled-access highway systems
- Transport in Europe
