= Lower Danube (Euroregion) =

Region in Romania, Moldova and Ukraine

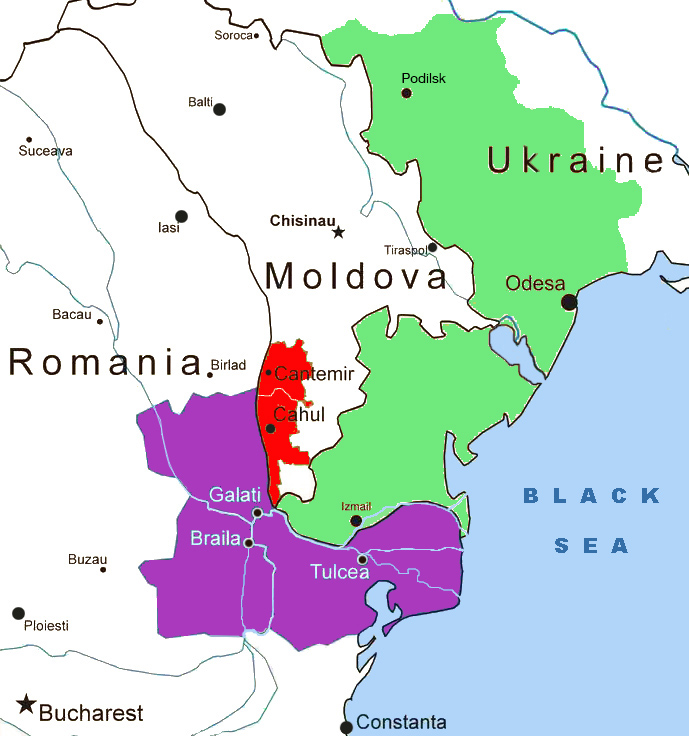

Lower Danube Euroregion is a Euroregion located in Romania, Republic of Moldova and Ukraine. The administrative center is Galați. In 2009 the Association for Cross-Border Cooperation "Lower Danube Euroregion" was created, having its headquarters in Galați. In December 2009, the Presidency of this Euroregion was transferred to Galați County for the next period. Since December 2012, the Euroregion Presidency is assumed by Tulcea County Council.

Lower Danube Euroregion is formed by Galați County, Brăila County, Tulcea County in Romania, Cantemir District and Cahul District in Republic of Moldova and Odesa Oblast (Izmail portion) in Ukraine.

== Largest cities ==
- Romania : Galați (295,000) and Brăila (219,496), both with a metro of 600,000, Tulcea (91,875), Tecuci (53,000)
- Republic of Moldova : Cahul (35,481) and Cantemir (12,734)
- Ukraine : Izmail (69,182)
