= Brăila Bridge =

Danube bridge in Romania

Brăila Bridge Podul peste Dunăre de la Brăila
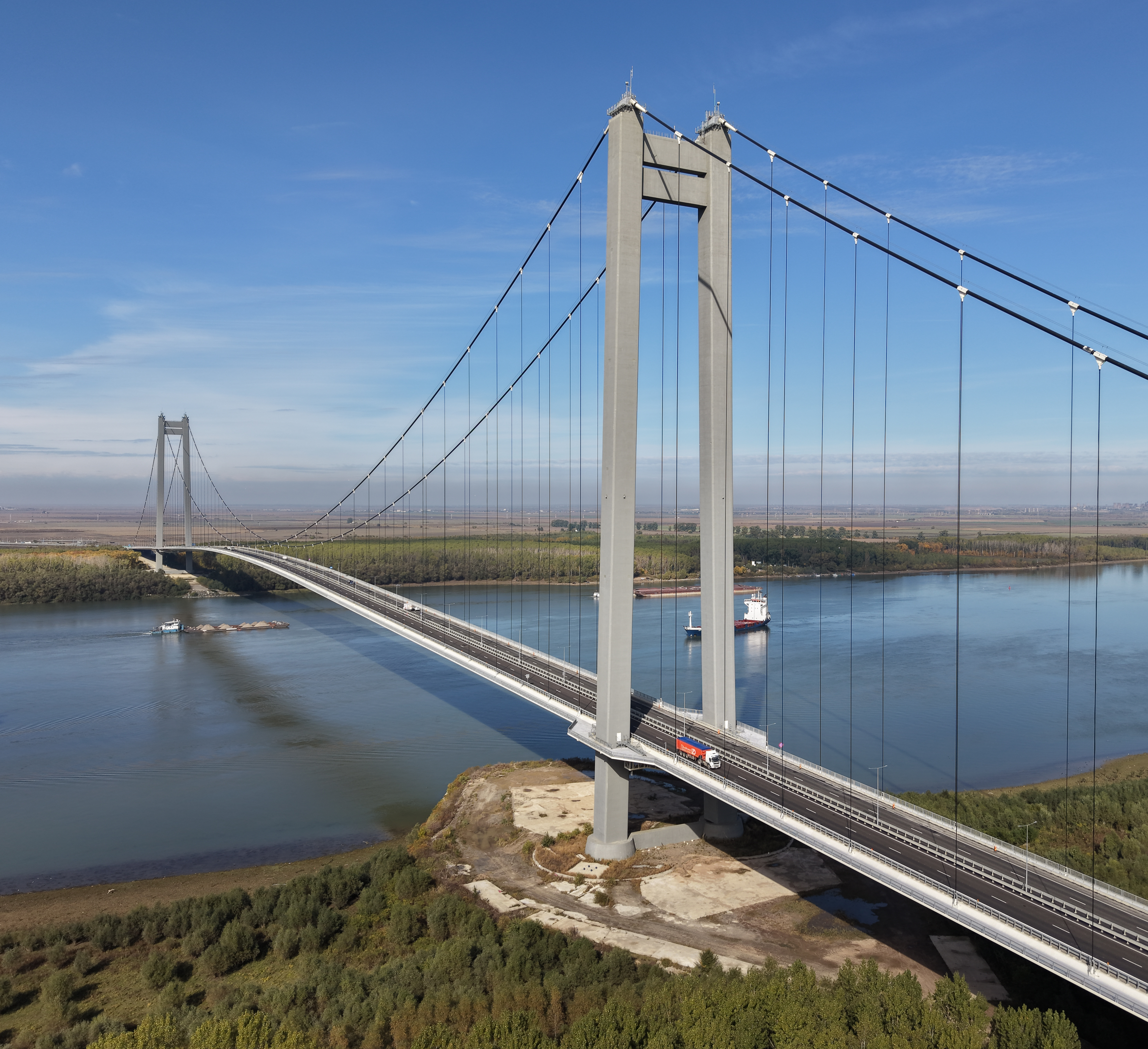
- Bridge photographed in October 2025
- Coordinates: 45°18′52″N 28°00′12″E
- Carries: Four lanes of the DN2S national road, two sidewalks (intended for maintenance works only)
- Crosses: Danube
- Locale: Between Brăila, Brăila County and Smârdan, Tulcea County
- Official name: Suspended Bridge over the Danube in Brăila Area
- Maintained by: Romanian National Company for Road Infrastructure Administration (C.N.A.I.R. S.A.)

Characteristics
- Design: Suspension bridge
- Total length: 2,194.3 m (7,199 ft)
- Width: 31.7 m (104 ft)
- Height: 192.64 m (632.0 ft) (towers)
- Longest span: 1,120 m (3,670 ft)
- Clearance below: 38 metres (125 ft)
- Design life: 120 years

History
- Designer: Astaldi S.p.A. and IHI Infrastructure Systems Co., Ltd.
- Constructed by: Webuild S.p.A. and IHI Infrastructure Systems Co., Ltd.
- Construction start: 19 December 2018
- Construction end: 2023
- Construction cost: €500 million
- Opened: 6 July 2023

Location
- Interactive map of Brăila Bridge

The Brăila Bridge (Romanian: Podul peste Dunăre de la Brăila) is a road suspension bridge in Romania over the Danube river, between Brăila, a major city in eastern Romania, and the opposite bank of the river in Tulcea County, on the DN2S national road and European route E87. It is the first and only bridge over the maritime Danube sector, and the fourth bridge over the Romanian section of the river. At nearly 2 km in length, it is the largest bridge over the Danube, and the third longest suspension bridge in the European Union. The bridge improves road traffic accessibility of the Galați-Brăila area to Constanța and Tulcea, and connections of the Moldavia and Muntenia regions with Dobruja. The European Union co-funded the project with €363 million from Cohesion Policy funds.

== Construction ==
First studies for a bridge in the Lower Danube region were done in 1986, but the first prefeasibility study was conducted in 1996. The final feasibility study was finished in 2016 by ISPCF and Pegaso Ingegneria.

In 2017, the bridge project was awarded to the Astaldi (now Webuild) and IHI Infrastructure Systems association for an estimated cost of €434 million, and the construction works started in December 2018.

In May 2021, the construction of the two main pillars had finished, and preparations had been started to deploy the first cables across the bridge. On 20 August 2021, it was reported that the construction of the bridge is on schedule and that half of the bridge was already done.

The first of the 86 suspended segments of the roadway were installed in spring 2022, with the last one on 28 June 2022. The bridge was opened on 6 July 2023.

== Specifications ==
The project consists of the construction of a suspension bridge of 1,974.30 m (6,477.4 ft) length with a 1,120 m (3,670 ft) main span, and two side spans of 489.65 m (1,606.5 ft) long on the Brăila bank of the river and 364.65 m (1,196.4 ft) long on the Tulcea bank of the river, two access viaducts of 110 m (360 ft) length on both sides (which bring the total length of the bridge to 2,194.3 m (7,199 ft)), and a connecting road with a total length of approximately 23 km (14 mi).

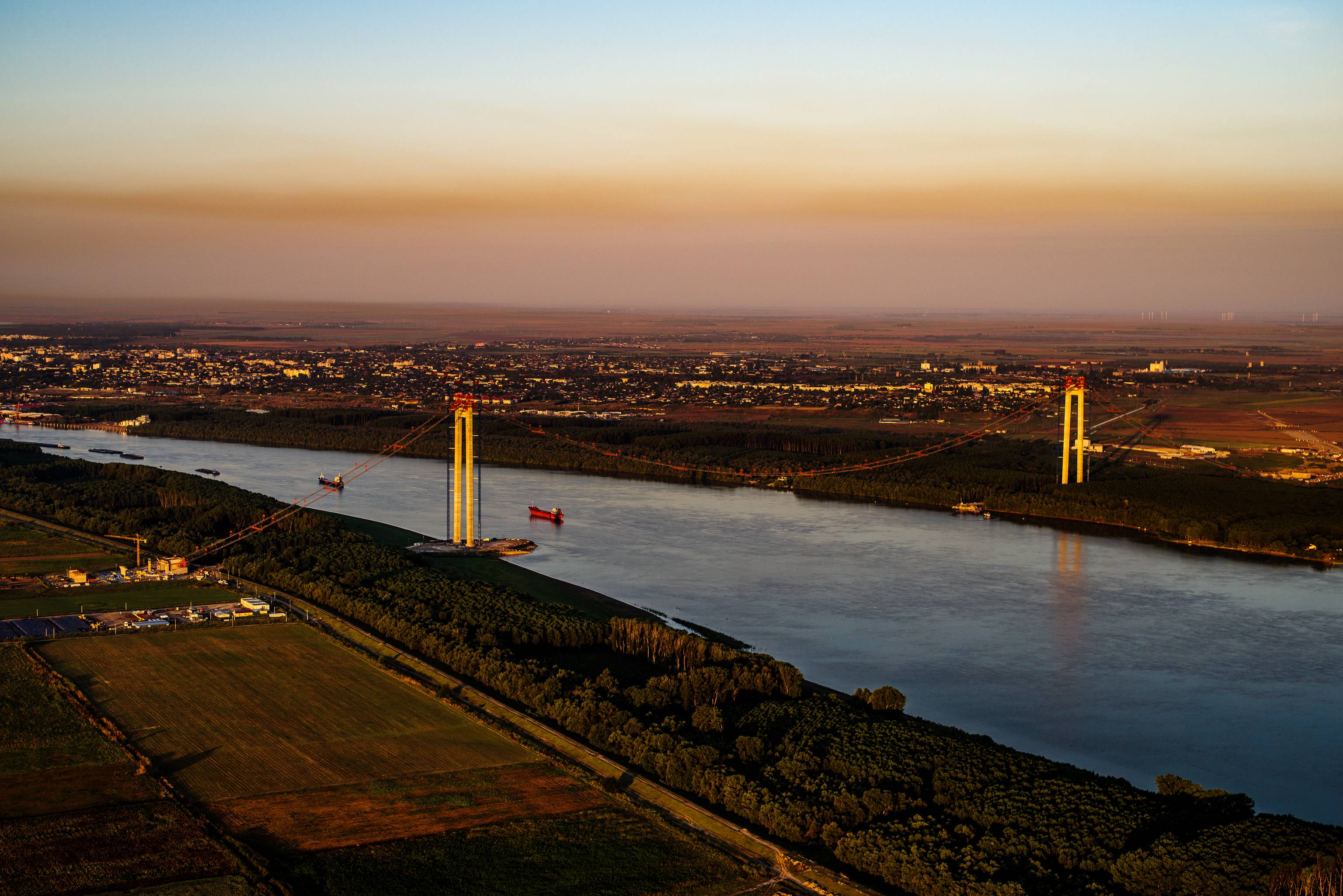
The Brăila Bridge under construction, August 2021

The Brăila suspension bridge and the connecting road project

== See also ==
- Roads in Romania
- List of bridges in Romania
- List of longest suspension bridge spans
