= Costache Negri, Galați =

Costache Negri
- Commune
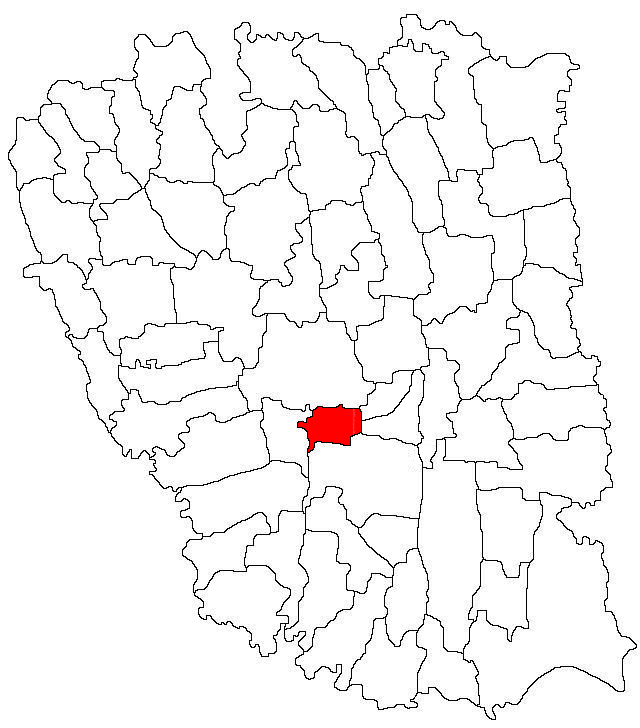
- Location in Galați County

- Location in Romania
- Coordinates: 45°42′N 27°43′E
- Country: Romania
- County: Galați

Government
  - Mayor (2020–2024): Luca Ștefan (PSD)
- Area: 26.8 km^{2} (10.3 sq mi)
- Elevation: 49 m (161 ft)
- Population (2021-12-01): 2,078
  - Density: 77.5/km^{2} (201/sq mi)
- Time zone: UTC+02:00 (EET)
  - Summer (DST): UTC+03:00 (EEST)
- Postal code: 807095
- Area code: (+40) 0236
- Vehicle reg.: GL
- Website: www.primariacostachenegri.ro

Costache Negri is a commune in Galați County, Western Moldavia, Romania. It is composed of a single village, Costache Negri, and is named after Costache Negri, an 1848 revolutionary, who had an estate in the village, which was previously named Mânjina.

The commune lies on the banks of the river Geru, at the southern edge of the Moldavian Plateau. It is located in the central part of the county, on county road DJ251, at a distance of 35 km (22 mi) from Tecuci and 45 km (28 mi) from the county seat, Galați.

Historical population
Year	Pop.	±%
2002	2,619	—
2011	2,287	−12.7%
2021	2,078	−9.1%
Source: Census data

At the 2021 census, Costache Negri had a population of 2,078; of those, 90% were Romanians.
