= Jijila =

- Commune
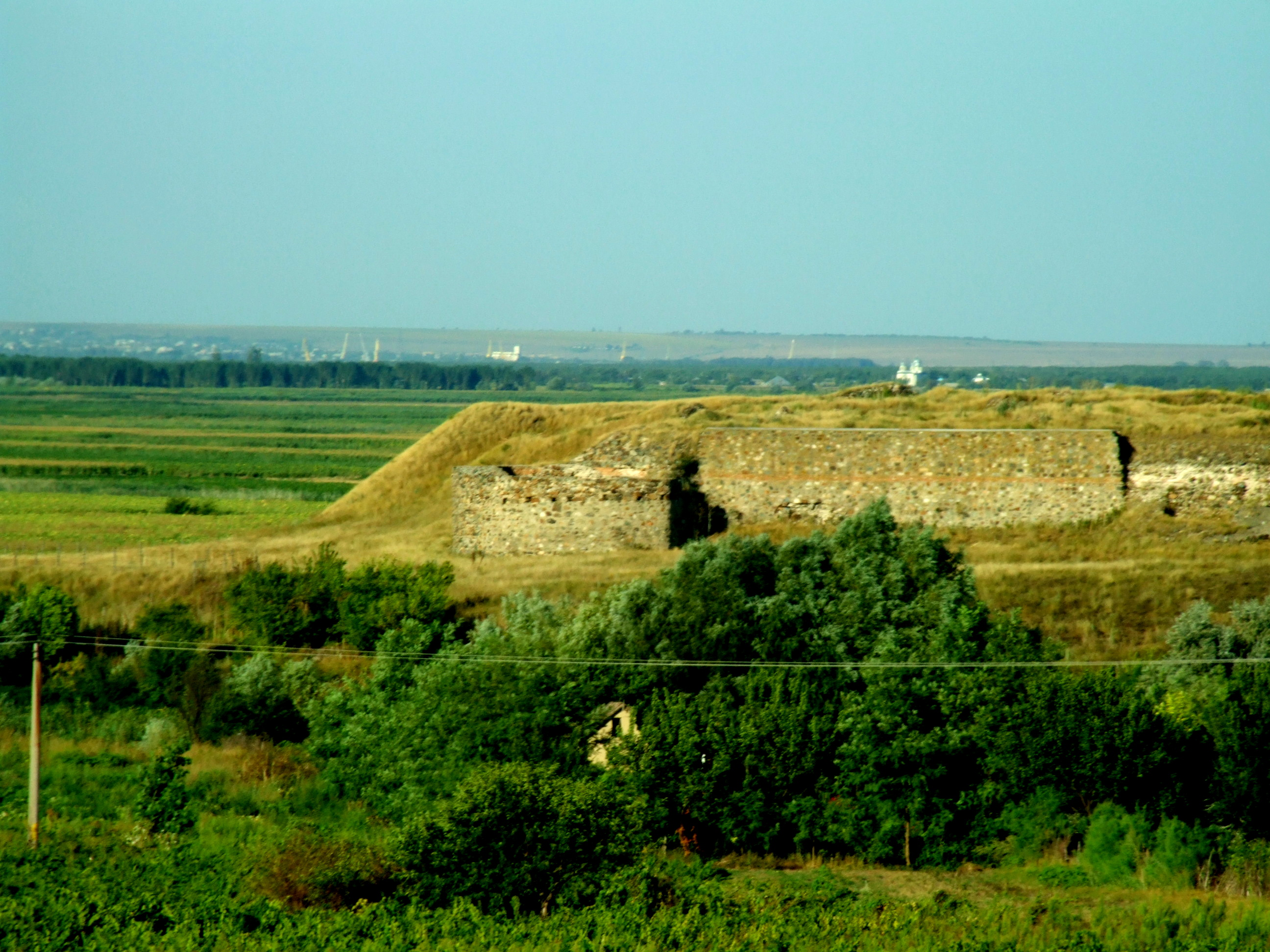

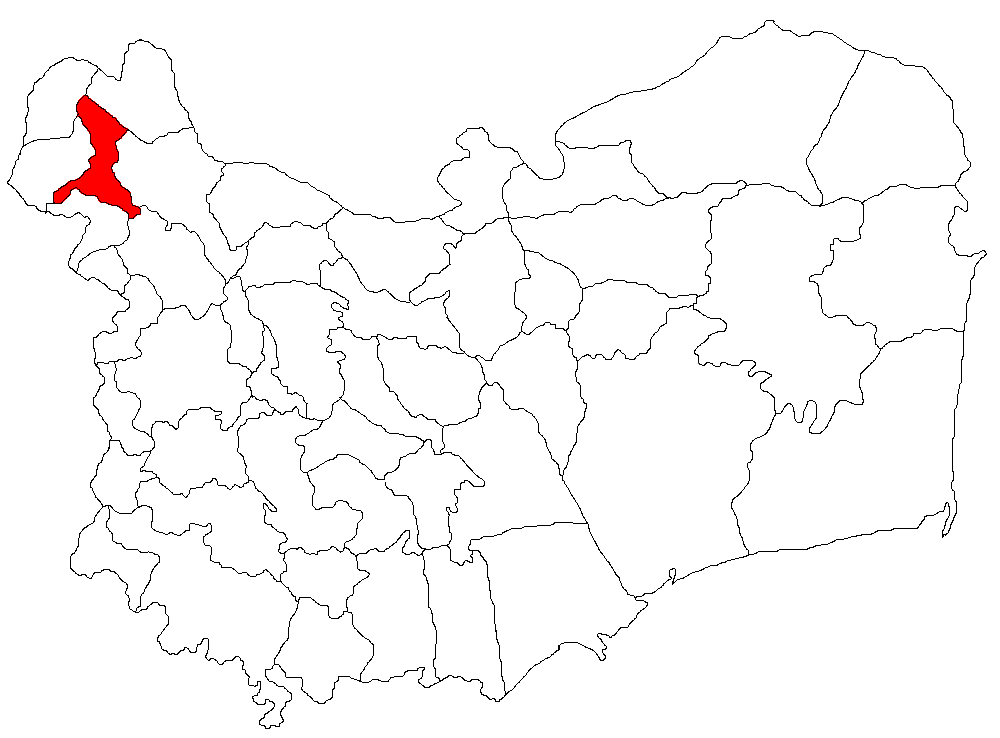
- Location in Tulcea County

- Location in Romania
- Coordinates: 45°18′N 28°09′E
- Country: Romania
- County: Tulcea
- Subdivisions: Garvăn, Jijila

Government
  - Mayor (2020–2024): Costică Deacu (PNL)
- Area: 130.36 km^{2} (50.33 sq mi)
- Elevation: 34 m (112 ft)
- Population (2021-12-01): 4,834
  - Density: 37.08/km^{2} (96.04/sq mi)
- Time zone: UTC+02:00 (EET)
  - Summer (DST): UTC+03:00 (EEST)
- Postal code: 827110
- Vehicle reg.: TL
- Website: comunajijila.ro

Jijila is a commune in Tulcea County, Northern Dobruja, Romania. It is composed of two villages, Garvăn and Jijila.
