= Băleni, Galați =

Băleni
- Commune
- Băleni
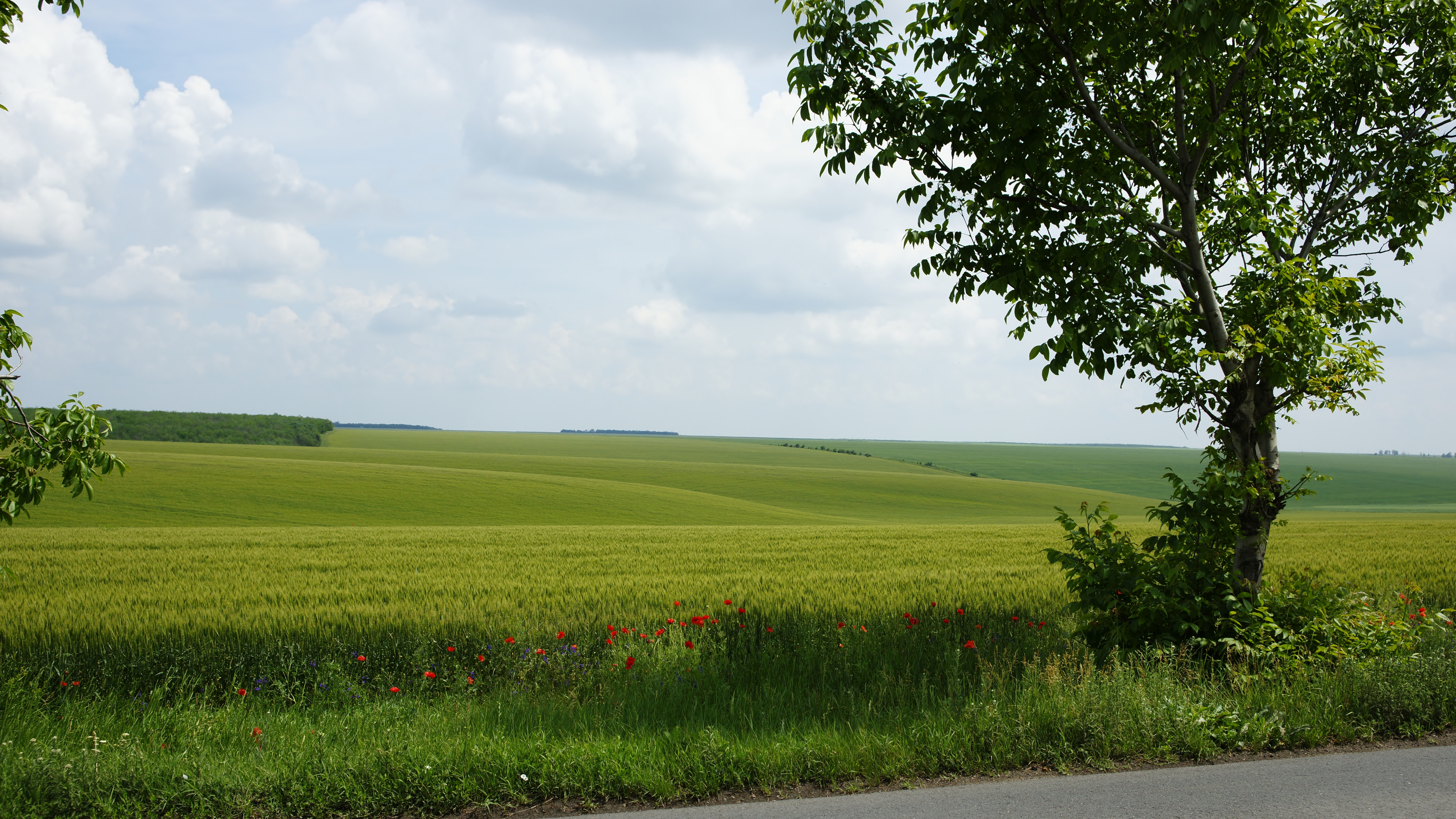

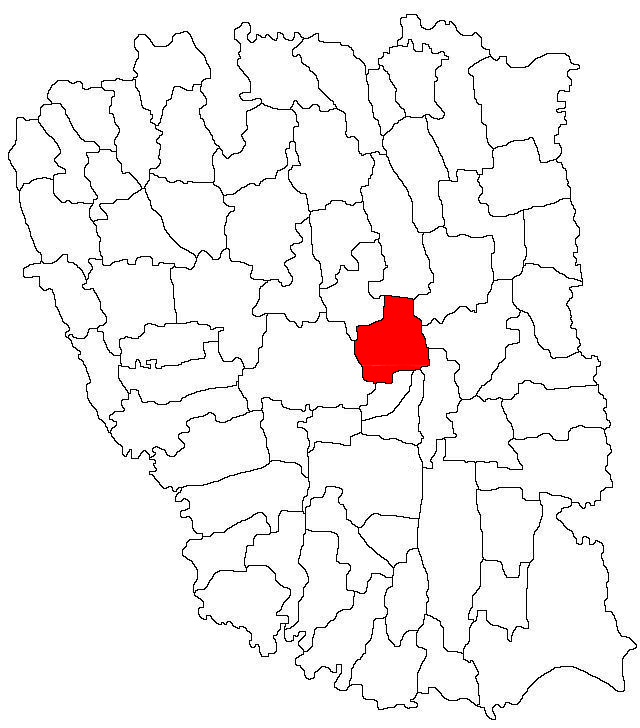
- Location in Galați County

- Location in Romania
- Coordinates: 45°49′N 27°51′E
- Country: Romania
- County: Galați

Government
  - Mayor (2024–2028): Ionel Popa (PSD)
- Area: 67.55 km^{2} (26.08 sq mi)
- Elevation: 188 m (617 ft)
- Population (2021-12-01): 1,882
  - Density: 27.86/km^{2} (72.16/sq mi)
- Time zone: UTC+02:00 (EET)
  - Summer (DST): UTC+03:00 (EEST)
- Postal code: 807025
- Area code: (+40) 0236
- Vehicle reg.: GL
- Website: www.comunabaleni.ro

Băleni is a commune in Galați County, Western Moldavia, Romania. It is composed of a single village, Băleni.

Historical population
| Year | Pop. | ±% |
|---|---|---|
| 2002 | 2,686 | — |
| 2011 | 2,332 | −13.2% |
| 2021 | 1,882 | −19.3% |
Source: Census data

At the 2021 census, the commune had a population of 1,882, of which 93.46% were Romanians.

== International relations ==
=== Twin towns – Sister cities ===
Băleni is twinned with:

- Amboise, France
