= Independența, Galați =

Independența
- Commune
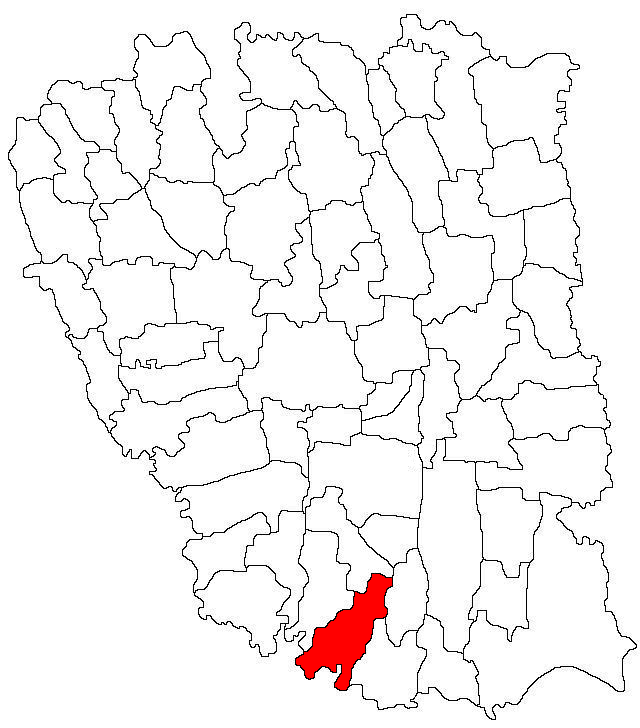
- Location in Galați County

- Location in Romania
- Coordinates: 45.4650°N 27.7418°E
- Country: Romania
- County: Galați
- Population (2021-12-01): 4,371
- Time zone: UTC+02:00 (EET)
  - Summer (DST): UTC+03:00 (EEST)
- Vehicle reg.: GL

Independența (Romanian pronunciation: [indepenˈdent͡sa]) is a commune in Galați County, Western Moldavia, Romania with a population of 4,930 people. It is composed of a single village, Independența.
