= Corni, Galați =

Corni
- Commune
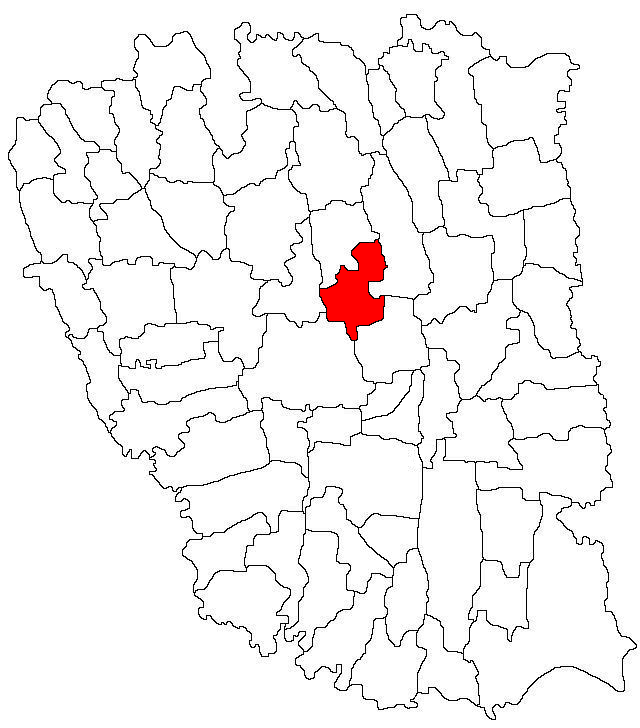
- Location in Galați County

- Location in Romania
- Coordinates: 45°51′27″N 27°46′58″E
- Country: Romania
- County: Galați

Government
  - Mayor (2024–2028): Petrișor-Lică Mohoria (PSD)
- Area: 50.08 km^{2} (19.34 sq mi)
- Elevation: 128 m (420 ft)
- Population (2021-12-01): 1,814
  - Density: 36.22/km^{2} (93.81/sq mi)
- Time zone: UTC+02:00 (EET)
  - Summer (DST): UTC+03:00 (EEST)
- Postal code: 807075
- Area code: (+40) 0236
- Vehicle reg.: GL
- Website: www.comunacorni.ro

Corni is a commune in Galați County, Western Moldavia, Romania. It is composed of three villages: Corni, Măcișeni, and Urlești.

Historical population
Year	Pop.	±%
2002	2,495	—
2011	2,066	−17.2%
2021	1,814	−12.2%
Source: Census data

At the 2021 census, the commune had a population of 1,814; of those, 95.2% were Romanians.
