= Piscu =

- Commune
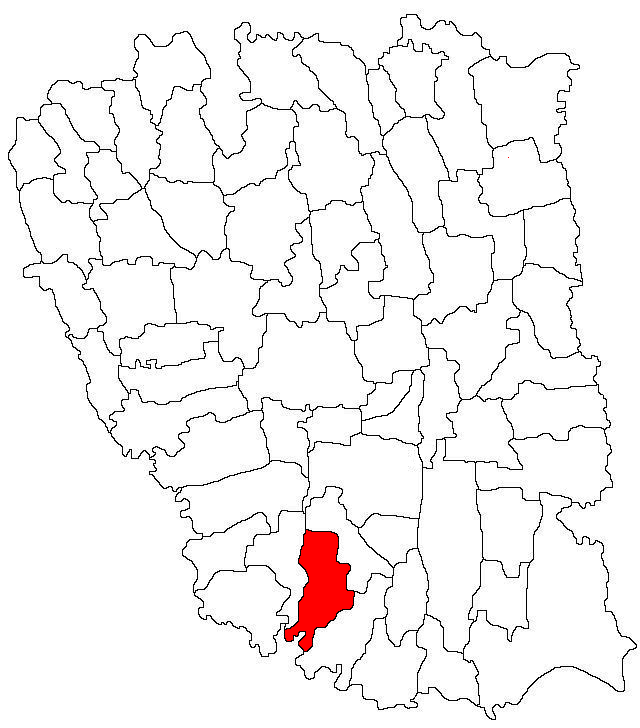
- Location in Galați County

- Location in Romania
- Coordinates: 45°30′N 27°44′E
- Country: Romania
- County: Galați
- Population (2021-12-01): 4,127
- Time zone: UTC+02:00 (EET)
  - Summer (DST): UTC+03:00 (EEST)
- Vehicle reg.: GL

Piscu is a commune in Galați County, Western Moldavia, Romania. It is composed of two villages, Piscu and Vameș.
