= Schela, Galați =

Schela
- Commune
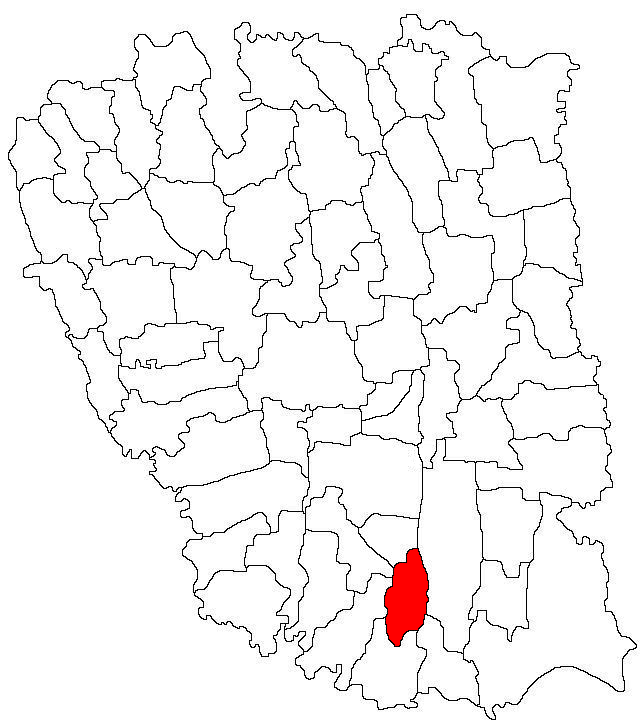
- Location in Galați County

- Location in Romania
- Coordinates: 45.5007°N 27.8299°E
- Country: Romania
- County: Galați
- Population (2021-12-01): 3,509
- Time zone: EET/EEST (UTC+2/+3)
- Vehicle reg.: GL

Schela is a commune in Galați County, Western Moldavia, Romania with a population of 3,521 people. It is composed of two villages, Negrea and Schela.
