= Braniștea, Galați =

Braniștea
- Commune
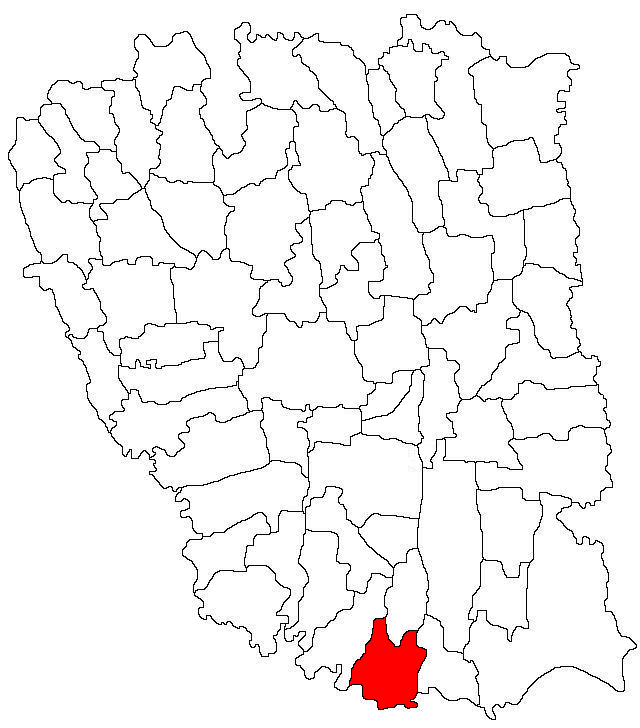
- Location in Galați County

- Location in Romania
- Coordinates: 45°26′13″N 27°50′24″E
- Country: Romania
- County: Galați

Government
  - Mayor (2024–2028): Grigore Iulian Dumbravă (PSD)
- Area: 61.95 km^{2} (23.92 sq mi)
- Elevation: 11 m (36 ft)
- Population (2021-12-01): 3,956
  - Density: 63.86/km^{2} (165.4/sq mi)
- Time zone: UTC+02:00 (EET)
  - Summer (DST): UTC+03:00 (EEST)
- Postal code: 807050
- Area code: (+40) 0236
- Vehicle reg.: GL
- Website: www.primariabranistea.ro

Braniștea is a commune in Galați County, Western Moldavia, Romania. It is composed of four villages, Braniștea, Lozova, Traian, and Vasile Alecsandri.

Historical population
Year	Pop.	±%
2002	4,097	—
2011	3,972	−3.1%
2021	3,956	−0.4%
Source: Census data

At the 2021 census, the commune had a population of 3,956, of which 92.44% were Romanians.
