= Tomești, Timiș =

Tomești
- Commune
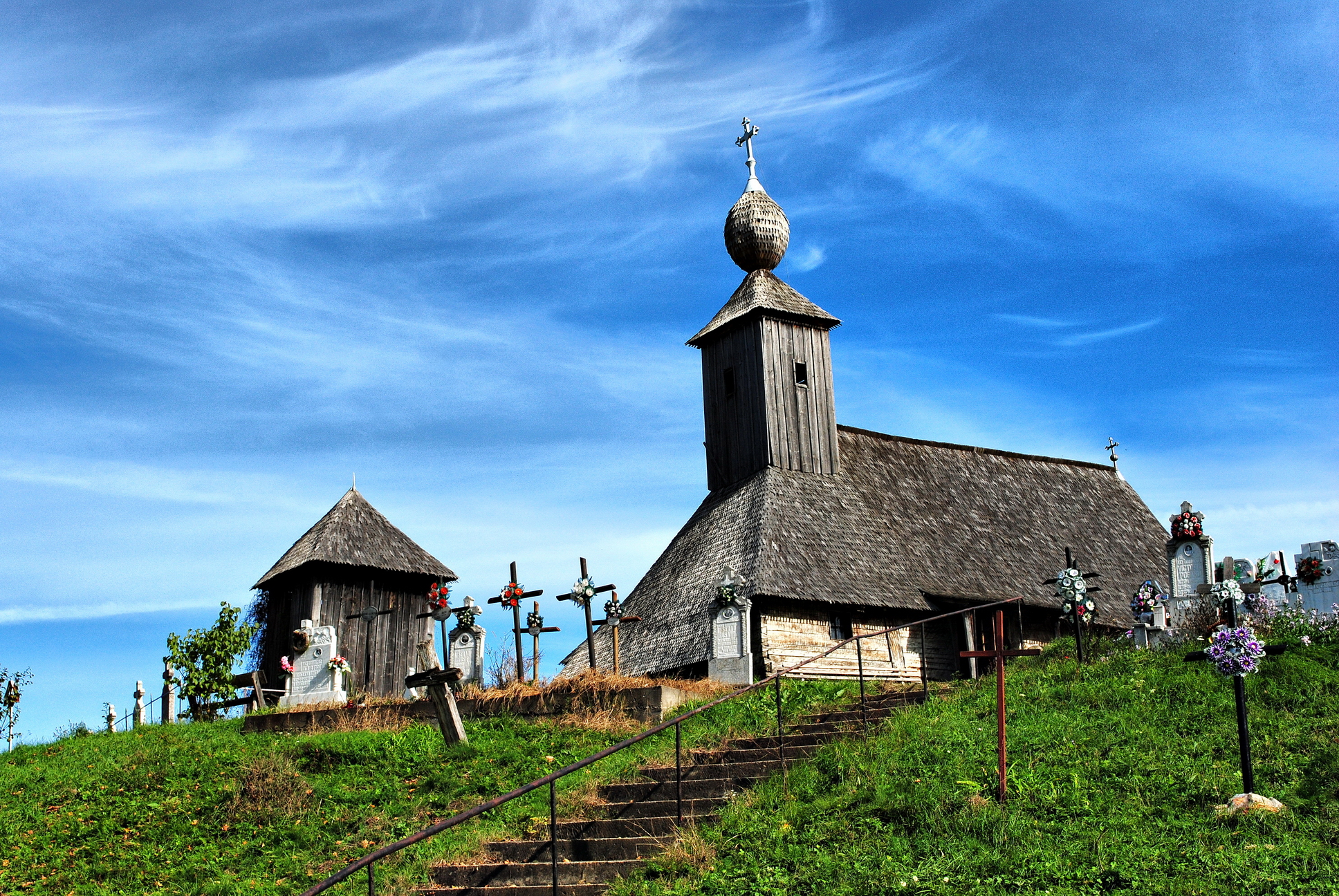
- The wooden church in Românești

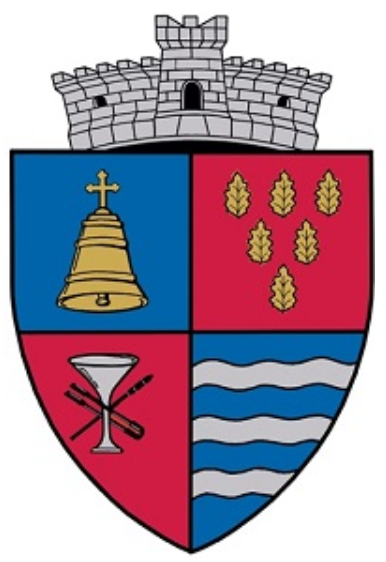
- Coat of arms

- Location in Timiș County

- Location in Romania
- Coordinates: 45°47′N 22°18′E
- Country: Romania
- County: Timiș

Government
  - Mayor (2012–): Costel Medelean (PNL)
- Area: 140.94 km^{2} (54.42 sq mi)
- Elevation: 877 m (2,877 ft)
- Population (2021-12-01): 1,879
  - Density: 13.33/km^{2} (34.53/sq mi)
- Time zone: UTC+02:00 (EET)
  - Summer (DST): UTC+03:00 (EEST)
- Postal code: 307410–307414
- Vehicle reg.: TM
- Website: tomesti.ro

Tomești (Hungarian: Tamásd; German: Tomsdorf) is a commune in Timiș County, Romania. It is composed of six villages: Baloșești, Colonia Fabricii, Luncanii de Jos, Luncanii de Sus, Românești and Tomești (commune seat).

== Geography ==
Tomești, with an area of 140.94 km^{2} (54.42 mi^{2}), is located in the east of Timiș County, on the northern slope of the Poiana Ruscă Mountains, on the upper course of the Bega River until its confluence with Șasa (Bega Poieni). The relief gradually descends from altitudes of over 1,300 m (4,300 ft) in the south of the commune to below 300 m (980 ft) in the north. The commune borders Curtea to the north, Pietroasa to the east, Hunedoara County to the southeast, Caraș-Severin County to the south, Nădrag to the southwest and Fârdea and Făget to the west.

=== Climate ===
Tomești commune is located in an area of complex morphoclimatic interference (mountain, piedmont and meadow) where the solar energy is distributed differently, and the circulation of western and northwestern air masses gives it certain peculiarities that can be grouped allover from south (mountainous area) to north (meadow area). The climate of the southern area falls within the climatic zone of the medium mountains with a longer duration and frequency of meteorological phenomena and with a transition to a hilly climate in the central and northern part. An important role is played by the forest vegetation with effects on the frequency and intensity of the wind, the precipitation regime, the relative humidity, the cloudiness and the duration of the sunshine, as well as the Bega River, which contributes to the production or amplification of the fog.

The average annual temperature records different values, in relation to the altitude, the exposure to the solar radiation and to the general circulation of the air masses. The annual thermal differences between sunny and sheltered slopes and those shaded and exposed to wind exceed 1–2 °C (1.8–3.6 °F). Tomești commune can be divided into distinct zones depending on the temperature:

- northern area (Tomești–Românești), average annual temperatures between 9.08 and 10.33 °C (48.34 and 50.59 °F);
- central area (Luncani), average annual temperatures between 7.83 and 8.58 °C (46.09 and 47.44 °F);
- southern area, average annual temperatures between 5 and 6 °C (41 and 43 °F).

In terms of rainfall, Tomești commune falls between the average annual isochetes of 750–1,100 mm (30–43 in), characteristic of high hills and medium mountains. Locally, in the highest areas, the average annual rainfall reaches totals of over 1,200 mm (47 in), around the Padeș and Rusca peaks. In the low areas in the north of the commune, average annual totals of 700–730 mm (28–29 in) are recorded.

The wind regime is dominated by winds from the northwest and west, followed by those from the southeast. The Lugoj–Făget–Margina–Bega Valley corridors allow a varied circulation of air masses. The presence of the Coșava–Curtea–Românești depression favors the channeling of some air currents in this direction, in the lower part of the atmosphere.

=== Flora ===
The zonal distribution of the vegetation of Tomești commune is determined by the thermal and humidity regime, the altitude and the soil constitution. The increase of the altitude from north to south causes a gradual decrease of the air temperature and an increase of the atmospheric precipitations in the southern part of the commune, leading to a zoning of the vegetation in altitude. In addition to this clear zoning, on smaller areas where specific microclimatic conditions are met, on different valleys, streams and springs, screes and meadow swamps, an intrazonal and azonal vegetation has formed.

Plain meadows are found in the low meadow area of the Bega River and its tributaries. Due to the humidity, the vegetation is represented by coppices of softwood trees: alder (Alnus glutinosa), white willow (Salix alba), crack willow (Salix × fragilis) and hydrophilic herbaceous species: dwarf sedge (Carex humilis), club-rush (Scirpus spp.), celery-leaved buttercup (Ranunculus sceleratus), horsetail (Equisetum arvense), etc. A large part of the meadows of the Bega River is occupied by agricultural lands, but there are also different places in the piedmont and low mountainous area, around the hearths of the villages and the plowed fields and hayfields, where bushes of dog rose (Rosa canina) and dewberry (Rubus caesius), as well as woody species such as elderberry (Sambucus nigra), hazel (Corylus avellana), blackthorn (Prunus spinosa), small-leaved linden (Tilia cordata), black locust (Robinia pseudoacacia), etc. are found.

From the hills to the highlands, the forests are predominantly deciduous, especially oak and beech. The subshrub species are represented by hazel (Corylus avellana), dog rose (Rosa canina), privet (Ligustrum vulgare), wild strawberry (Fragaria vesca) found at the edge of forests and in glades, raspberry (Rubus idaeus) which is spreading more and more as a result of deforestation.

=== Fauna ===
Deciduous forests are populated with different species of mammals (wolf, red fox, badger, wild boar, brown hare, wildcat, roe deer, garden dormouse), birds (turtle dove, great spotted woodpecker, green woodpecker, blackbird, great tit, barn swallow, cuckoo, hoopoe, tawny owl, eagle-owl, house sparrow, hooded crow) and invertebrates (fruit lecanium, chestnut tortrix, beech gall midge). The undergrowth of coniferous and beech forests, which grow in the high area of the commune, on the upper course of the Bega River and its tributaries, is populated by brown bear, red deer, lynx and some rodents (rat, wood mouse, bank vole). The fauna of the flowing waters is represented by species of fishing interest: river trout, barbel and chub.

== History ==
Tomești is first mentioned in the Turkish period, in a Turkish defter from 1597 in which it is shown that it was part of Hunyad County. After 1724, many of the inhabitants worked at the mines in Luncani, and from the 19th century at the glass factory in Colonia Fabricii. In the interwar period it was part of Plasa Margina, Severin County. At the same time, the Germans formed a large community, accounting for about a third of the total population. After 1990, the village felt strongly the fall of the glass industry, unemployment becoming the main problem.

== Demographics ==
Ethnic composition (2021)
1. Romanians (94.7%)
2. Roma (1.06%)
3. Unknown (2.87%)
4. Others (1.34%)
Religious composition (2021)
1. Orthodox (85.7%)
2. Pentecostals (6.43%)
3. Baptists (1.80%)
4. Roman Catholics (1.75%)
5. Unknown (3.19%)
6. Others (1.10%)

Tomești had a population of 1,879 inhabitants at the 2021 census, down 10.23% from the 2011 census. Most inhabitants are Romanians (94.73%), with a minority of Roma (1.06%). For 2.87% of the population, ethnicity is unknown. By religion, most inhabitants are Orthodox (85.73%), but there are also minorities of Pentecostals (6.43%), Baptists (1.8%) and Roman Catholics (1.75%). For 3.19% of the population, religious affiliation is unknown.

Census		Ethnic composition
Year	Population	Romanians	Hungarians	Germans	Roma	Slovaks
1880	2,362	1,975	30	274	–	35
1890	2,233	1,929	38	227	–	8
1900	2,411	2,117	76	158	–	37
1910	2,455	2,152	84	183	–	17
1920	2,339	2,113	30	196	–	–
1930	2,671	2,293	51	276	14	35
1941	2,345	2,222	14	87	–	–
1956	2,517	2,360	65	59	–	7
1966	3,327	3,126	81	74	12	5
1977	3,201	3,000	97	75	10	6
1992	2,888	2,734	71	61	5	–
2002	2,261	2,197	37	22	–	–
2011	2,093	1,984	17	8	40	–
2021	1,879	1,780	14	8	20	–

== Politics and administration ==
The commune of Tomești is administered by a mayor and a local council composed of 11 councilors. The mayor, Costel Medelean, from the National Liberal Party, has been in office since 2012. As from the 2024 local elections, the local council has the following composition by political parties:

Party	Seats	Composition
Social Democratic Party–National Liberal Party	6	
Alliance for the Union of Romanians	2	
Social Liberal Humanist Party	2	
Ind.	1	

== Notable people ==
- Oscar Szuhanek (1887–1972), painter
