= Bega Poienilor =

Bega Poienilor Bega Mică
- Location within Romania

Location
- Country: Romania
- Counties: Timiș County
- Villages: Poieni, Crivina de Sus, Pietroasa

Physical characteristics
- Source: Poiana Ruscă Mountains
- Mouth: Bega
  - location: Curtea
  - coordinates: 45.8274°N 22.3146°E
- Length: 35 km (22 mi)
- Basin size: 173 km^{2} (67 sq mi)

Basin features
- Progression: Bega→ Tisza→ Danube→ Black Sea
- Tributaries
  - left: Pustiu
  - right: Izvorașu, Valea Mare

The Bega Poienilor (also: Bega Mică, in its upper course: Șasa) is the right headwater of the river Bega in Romania. At its confluence with the Bega Luncanilor in Curtea, the Bega is formed. Its length is 35 km (22 mi) and its basin size is 173 km^{2} (67 sq mi).
