= Cladova =

Cladova may refer to several places in Romania:

- Cladova, a village in Păuliș Commune, Arad County
- Cladova, a village in Bethausen Commune, Timiș County
- Cladova (Bega), a tributary of the Bega River in Timiș County
- Cladova (Mureș), tributary of the Mureș River in Arad County

== See also ==
- Kladovo (Romanian: Cladova), a town and municipality in Bor District, eastern Serbia
