= Bega Luncanilor =

Bega Luncanilor Bega Mare
- Location within Romania

Location
- Country: Romania
- Counties: Timiș County
- Villages: Luncanii de Jos, Tomeşti, Românești, Curtea

Physical characteristics
- Mouth: Bega
  - location: Curtea
  - coordinates: 45.8274°N 22.3146°E
- Length: 28 km (17 mi)
- Basin size: 123 km^{2} (47 sq mi)

Basin features
- Progression: Bega→ Tisza→ Danube→ Black Sea

The Bega Luncanilor (also: Bega Mare) is the left headwater of the river Bega in Romania. It is also considered the upper course of the Bega. At its confluence with the Bega Poienilor in Curtea, the Bega is formed. Its length is 28 km (17 mi) and its basin size is 123 km^{2} (47 sq mi).

== Tributaries ==
The following rivers are tributaries to the river Bega Luncanilor (in downstream order):

- Left: Valea Tăieturii, Pârâul Mare
- Right: Stâlpu, Valea lui Liman, Druia, Cornetu
