= Nieregiș =

- Location within Romania

Location
- Country: Romania
- Counties: Timiș County
- Villages: Dobrești, Lăpușnic

Physical characteristics
- Mouth: Bega
  - location: Upstream of Bodo
  - coordinates: 45.8172°N 21.9011°E

Basin features
- Progression: Bega→ Tisza→ Danube→ Black Sea

The Nieregiș is a right tributary of the river Bega in Romania. It flows into the Bega near Cutina. Its length is 14 km (8.7 mi) and its basin size is 38 km^{2} (15 sq mi).
