= Năndreasca =

- Location within Romania

Location
- Country: Romania
- Counties: Timiș County
- Villages: Coșava

Physical characteristics
- Mouth: Bega
  - location: Coșava
  - coordinates: 45.8433°N 22.2941°E
- Length: 9 km (5.6 mi)
- Basin size: 29 km^{2} (11 sq mi)

Basin features
- Progression: Bega→ Tisza→ Danube→ Black Sea
- Tributaries
  - left: Homojdia

The Năndreasca is a right tributary of the river Bega in Romania. It flows into the Bega near Coșava. Its length is 9 km (5.6 mi) and its basin size is 29 km^{2} (11 sq mi).
