= Recaș (disambiguation) =

Recaş may refer to:

- Recaș, town in Timiș County, Banat, Romania
- Recaș River, tributary of the Valea Cărăşiţa River in Romania
- ACS Recaș, Romanian professional football club from Recaş, Timiș County

== Recas ==
- Recas, municipality located in the province of Toledo, Castile-La Mancha, Spain

== See also ==
- Reca (disambiguation)
