= Lipari (disambiguation) =

Lipari is a town in Sicily.

Lipari may refer to:

- Mike Lipari (1932–2012), Canadian weightlifter
- Mirco Lipari (born 2002), Italian footballer
- Lipari river, a tributary of Mociur river, Romania
