= Kosso (disambiguation) =

Kosso is the common name of the east African tree Hagenia abyssinica.

Kosso may also refer to:

- Coşava, a Romanian village, Kossó in Hungarian
- Pterocarpus erinaceus, a west African tree
