= Repas =

Repas may refer to:

== Toponyms ==
- Repaš, a village in Croatia
- Repaș River, a tributary in Romania
- Répás, a village in Romania

== People ==
- Jan Repas (born 1997), Slovenian footballer
- Žiga Repas (born 2001), Slovenian footballer
