= Fădimac =

- Location within Romania

Location
- Country: Romania
- Counties: Timiș County
- Villages: Bara, Fădimac, Târgoviște

Physical characteristics
- Mouth: Bega
  - coordinates: 45.7993°N 21.8206°E
- Length: 14 km (8.7 mi)
- Basin size: 172 km^{2} (66 sq mi)

Basin features
- Progression: Bega→ Tisza→ Danube→ Black Sea

The Fădimac is a right tributary of the river Bega in Romania. It flows into the Bega near Balinț. Its length is 14 km (8.7 mi) and its basin size is 172 km^{2} (66 sq mi).
