= Rădmănești fossil site =

- IUCN category IV (habitat/species management area)
- Location within Romania
- Location: Rădmănești (Bara), Timiș County, Romania
- Coordinates: 45°57′33″N 21°52′39″E
- Area: 4 ha (9.9 acres)
- Established: 1995, 2000

The Rădmănești fossil site is a nationally protected area classified under IUCN Category IV (paleontological nature reserve). It is located in Timiș County (Romania), within the administrative boundaries of Bara commune. The site was discovered in 1870 by geologist and paleontologist Theodor Fuchs, who identified 52 mollusk species within the deposit. Several of these species were found to be extremely rare or even unique, leading to the site's recognition as one of the most significant paleontological deposits in the Pontic Basin.

== Location ==
The nature reserve, covering an area of 4 ha, is situated at the northern edge of Timiș County, along the border with Arad County. It lies within the administrative boundaries of Bara commune, in a location known as Piatra Rea. The nearest town is Lugoj, located 10 km from the site.

== Description ==
The nature reserve was designated as a protected area under Law No. 5 of March 6, 2000. It encompasses a section of the Miniș Valley meadow characterized by landslides and geological outcrops, where sedimentary rock layers contain significant deposits of fossil mollusk fauna attributed to the Tertiary period. These deposits are comparable to those found at the Zăbalț fossil site in neighboring Arad County. A total of 121 fossil species, including both bivalves (lamellibranchs) and gastropods, have been documented within the site.

== See also ==
- List of fossiliferous stratigraphic units in Romania
