= Zopana =

- Location within Romania

Location
- Country: Romania
- Counties: Timiș County
- Villages: Begheiu Mic, Dumbrava

Physical characteristics
- Source: Poiana Ruscă Mountains
- Mouth: Bega
  - location: Răchita
  - coordinates: 45.8394°N 22.1060°E
- Length: 10 km (6.2 mi)
- Basin size: 47 km^{2} (18 sq mi)

Basin features
- Progression: Bega→ Tisza→ Danube→ Black Sea
- Tributaries
  - left: Bălășina

The Zopana is a left tributary of the river Bega in Romania. It flows into the Bega in Răchita. Its length is 10 km (6.2 mi), and its basin size is 47 km^{2} (18 sq mi).
