= Vădana =

- Location within Romania

Location
- Country: Romania
- Counties: Timiș County
- Villages: Brănești, Bătești

Physical characteristics
- Source: Poiana Ruscă Mountains
- Mouth: Bega
  - location: Făget
  - coordinates: 45.8572°N 22.1855°E
- Length: 16 km (9.9 mi)
- Basin size: 35 km^{2} (14 sq mi)

Basin features
- Progression: Bega→ Tisza→ Danube→ Black Sea

The Vădana is a left tributary of the river Bega in Romania. It discharges into the Bega in Făget. Its length is 16 km (9.9 mi) and its basin size is 35 km^{2} (14 sq mi).
