= Cladova (Bega) =

- Location within Romania

Location
- Country: Romania
- Counties: Timiș County
- Villages: Ohaba Lungă, Cladova, Bethausen

Physical characteristics
- Mouth: Bega
  - location: Bethausen
  - coordinates: 45.8283°N 21.9375°E
- Length: 19 km (12 mi)
- Basin size: 61 km^{2} (24 sq mi)

Basin features
- Progression: Bega→ Tisza→ Danube→ Black Sea

The Cladova is a right tributary of the river Bega in Romania. It discharges into the Bega in Bethausen. Its length is 19 km (12 mi) and its basin size is 61 km^{2} (24 sq mi).
