= Valea Țiganului =

- Location within Romania

Location
- Country: Romania
- Counties: Timiș County

Physical characteristics
- Mouth: Bega
  - location: Izvin
  - coordinates: 45.7771°N 21.4788°E
- Length: 9 km (5.6 mi)
- Basin size: 37 km^{2} (14 sq mi)

Basin features
- Progression: Bega→ Tisza→ Danube→ Black Sea
- Tributaries
  - left: Curașița

The Valea Țiganului is a right tributary of the river Bega in Romania. It discharges into the Bega in Izvin. Its length is 9 km (5.6 mi) and its basin size is 37 km^{2} (14 sq mi).
