= Icui =

- Location within Romania

Location
- Country: Romania
- Counties: Timiș County
- Villages: Coșteiu de Sus, Nemeșești, Margina

Physical characteristics
- Mouth: Bega
  - location: Margina
  - coordinates: 45.8614°N 22.2672°E
- Length: 16 km (9.9 mi)
- Basin size: 53 km^{2} (20 sq mi)

Basin features
- Progression: Bega→ Tisza→ Danube→ Black Sea

The Icui is a right tributary of the river Bega in Romania. It discharges into the Bega in Margina. Its length is 16 km (9.9 mi) and its basin size is 53 km^{2} (20 sq mi).
