= Reca (disambiguation) =

Reca or RECA can be:

- Reca, village and municipality in western Slovakia in Senec District in the Bratislava Region
- RecA, protein essential for the repair and maintenance of DNA
- Radiation Exposure Compensation Act (RECA)
- Damian Reca (1894–1937), Argentine chess master
- Sofía Reca (born 1984), Argentine actress
- Arkadiusz Reca (born 1995), Polish footballer

== See also ==
- Recaş (disambiguation)
