= Pietroasa, Timiș =

Pietroasa
- Commune
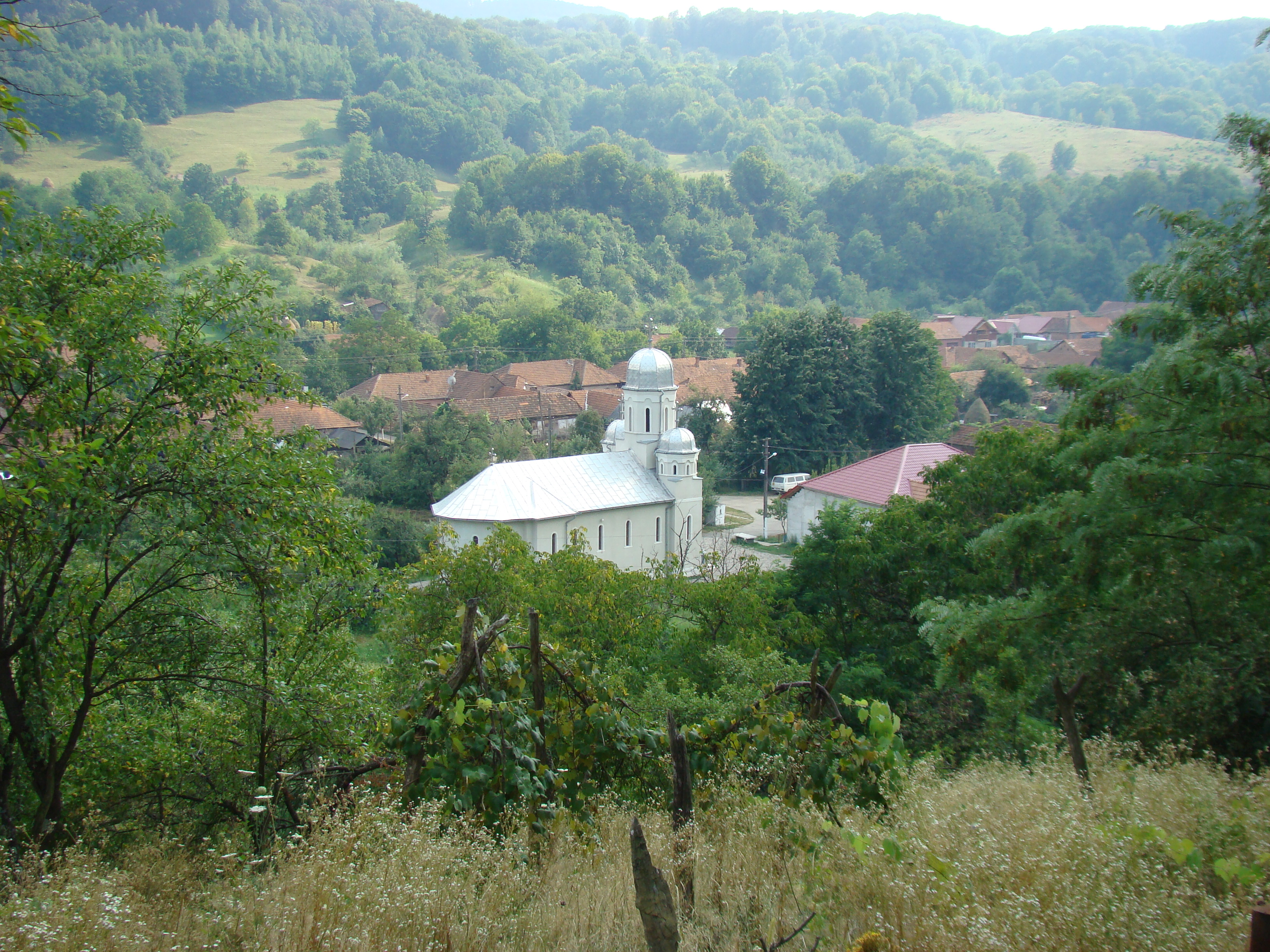
- The Lower Orthodox Church in Pietroasa

- Location in Timiș County

- Location in Romania
- Coordinates: 45°50′N 22°24′E
- Country: Romania
- County: Timiș

Government
  - Mayor (2020–): Virgiliu-Victor Ciocea (PSD)
- Area: 156.46 km^{2} (60.41 sq mi)
- Population (2021-12-01): 1,012
  - Density: 6.468/km^{2} (16.75/sq mi)
- Time zone: UTC+02:00 (EET)
  - Summer (DST): UTC+03:00 (EEST)
- Postal code: 307320–307323
- Vehicle reg.: TM
- Website: www.primariapietroasa.ro

Pietroasa (Hungarian: Kőfalu; German: Steindorf) is a commune in Timiș County, Romania. It is composed of four villages: Crivina de Sus, Fărășești, Pietroasa (commune seat) and Poieni.

== Geography ==
Pietroasa is located at the foot of the Poiana Ruscă Mountains, on the Bega River. It is the easternmost commune of Timiș County, bordering Hunedoara County. The nearest town is Făget, 26 km (16 mi) away. It is also one of the largest communes of Timiș County, stretching over 156.46 ha (386.6 acres) of land. Being located in an area of high hills and mountains, the forests occupy 129.06 ha (318.9 acres).

== History ==
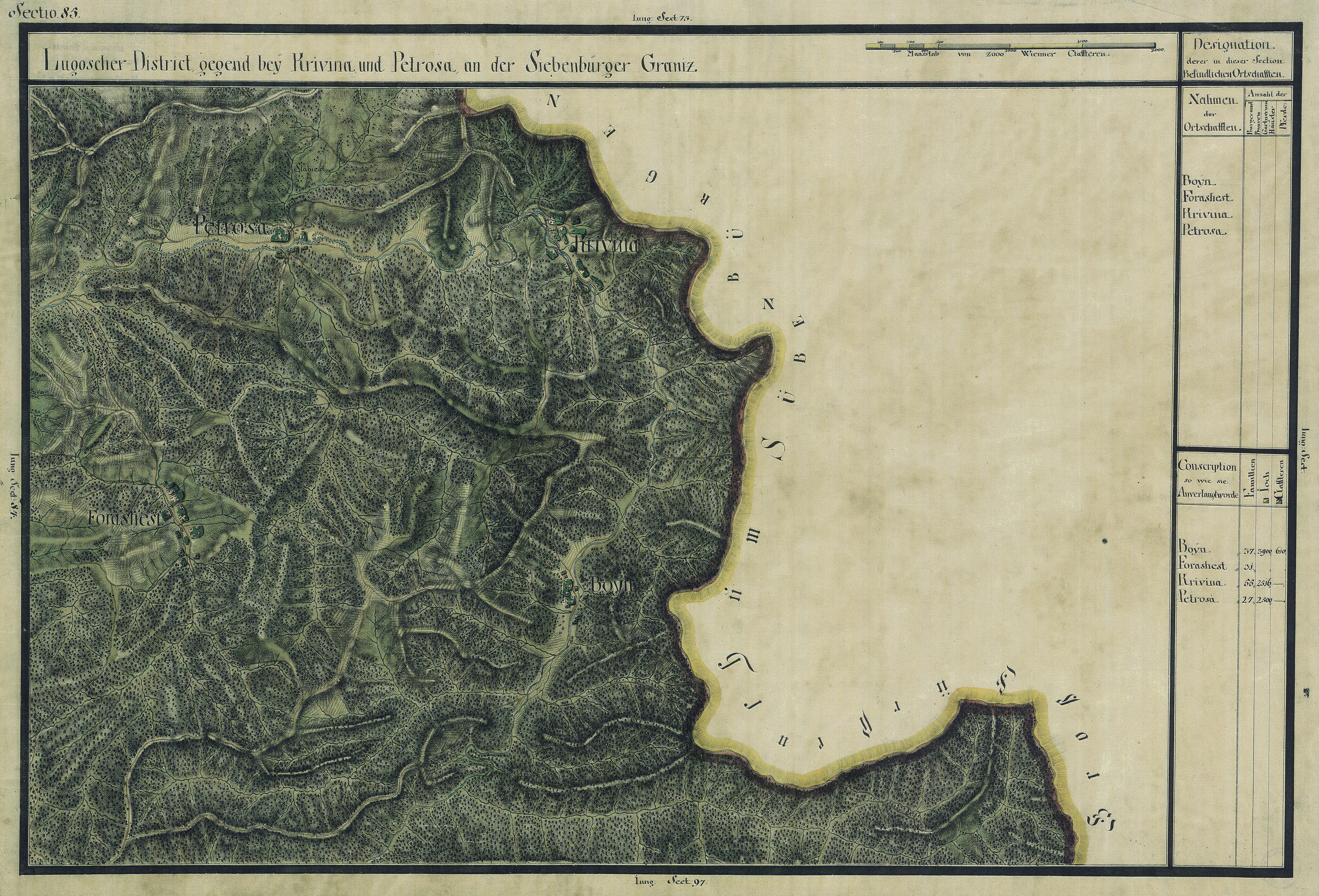
The four villages of the commune on the Josephinische Landesaufnahme of 1769–1772

The first recorded mention of Pietroasa dates from 1514, when it was owned by George of Brandenburg-Ansbach and had 15 serfs. At that time, Pietroasa was part of Marzsina District, which belonged to Hunyad County. In 1597, Sigismund Báthory donated Petroza to Stephen Török, who in 1612 pawned it to Gabriel Bethlen. In 1620, Gabriel Bethlen donated it to Stephen Bethlen Jr. During this period, the locality belonged sometimes to Hunyad County, sometimes to Temes County. The locality appears in the conscription of 1717 under the name of Petrovaz, having 15 houses and being part of Facsád District. After the Treaty of Passarowitz (1718), when Banat came under Habsburg rule, Pietroasa was part, at first, of Facsád District, being mentioned as Petrossa. In 1819 it was donated to Matthew Trattner's family, after which it became the property of the Cika family. In 1890 it received the status of commune seat.

Poieni is located 10 km (6.2 mi) from Pietroasa and is first mentioned in 1514–1516 under the name of Pleyen, when it was owned by George of Brandenburg-Ansbach and had seven serfs.

Crivina de sus, located 4 km (2.5 mi) from Pietroasa, is first mentioned in 1514–1516 and, along with Pietroasa and Poieni, was part of the properties of George of Brandenburg-Ansbach.

Fărășești is first mentioned in 1548 under the name of Forrásfalva, as the property of the nobleman John of Bozwar.

== Demographics ==
Ethnic composition (2021)
1. Romanians (90.9%)
2. Unknown (9.10%)
Religious composition (2021)
1. Orthodox (64.3%)
2. Pentecostals (20.8%)
3. Baptists (4.84%)
4. Unknown (10.1%)

Pietroasa had a population of 1,012 inhabitants at the 2021 census, down 9.64% from the 2011 census. Most inhabitants are Romanians (90.9%). For 9.1% of the population, ethnicity is unknown. By religion, most inhabitants are Orthodox (64.32%), but there are also minorities of Pentecostals (20.75%) and Baptists (4.84%). For 10.09% of the population, religious affiliation is unknown.

Census		Ethnic composition
Year	Population	Romanians	Hungarians	Germans	Ukrainians
1880	1,817	1,737	30	39	–
1890	2,032	2,008	3	17	–
1900	2,138	2,033	49	34	–
1910	2,208	2,083	65	16	35
1920	1,919	1,905	12	1	–
1930	1,942	1,920	8	11	–
1941	1,760	1,752	1	6	–
1956	1,578	1,577	1	–	–
1966	1,691	1,664	20	–	2
1977	1,412	1,411	–	–	–
1992	1,166	1,162	1	–	1
2002	1,174	1,173	–	–	1
2011	1,120	1,093	–	–	–
2021	1,012	920	–	–	–

== Politics and administration ==
The commune of Pietroasa is administered by a mayor and a local council composed of 9 councilors. The mayor, Virgiliu-Victor Ciocea, from the Social Democratic Party, has been in office since 2020. As from the 2024 local elections, the local council has the following composition by political parties:

Party	Seats	Composition
Social Democratic Party–National Liberal Party	7	
Alliance for the Union of Romanians	1	
People's Movement Party	1	

== Economy ==
The main source of income for the inhabitants is agriculture, especially animal husbandry. The agricultural lands located on high hills are still worked with animals (horses and oxen), the vegetal production being small but ecological. The threshing of wheat in the villages of Pietroasa and Fărășești is still done with threshers built in the 19th century. In the villages of Crivina de Sus and Poieni, water mills are still used for grinding wheat and corn. The pastures, of low quality and used for raising animals, are extensive but infested with ferns.

== Points of interest ==
- Crivina de Sus wooden church (1676)
- Pietroasa wooden church (1779)
- Poieni wooden church (1759)
- 370-meter-long (1,210 ft) Blue Cave, known as such due to a chromatic dominance ("Pietroasa blue")
- former millstone quarries on Dealul Pietrii (18th century)
- Șopot Waterfall
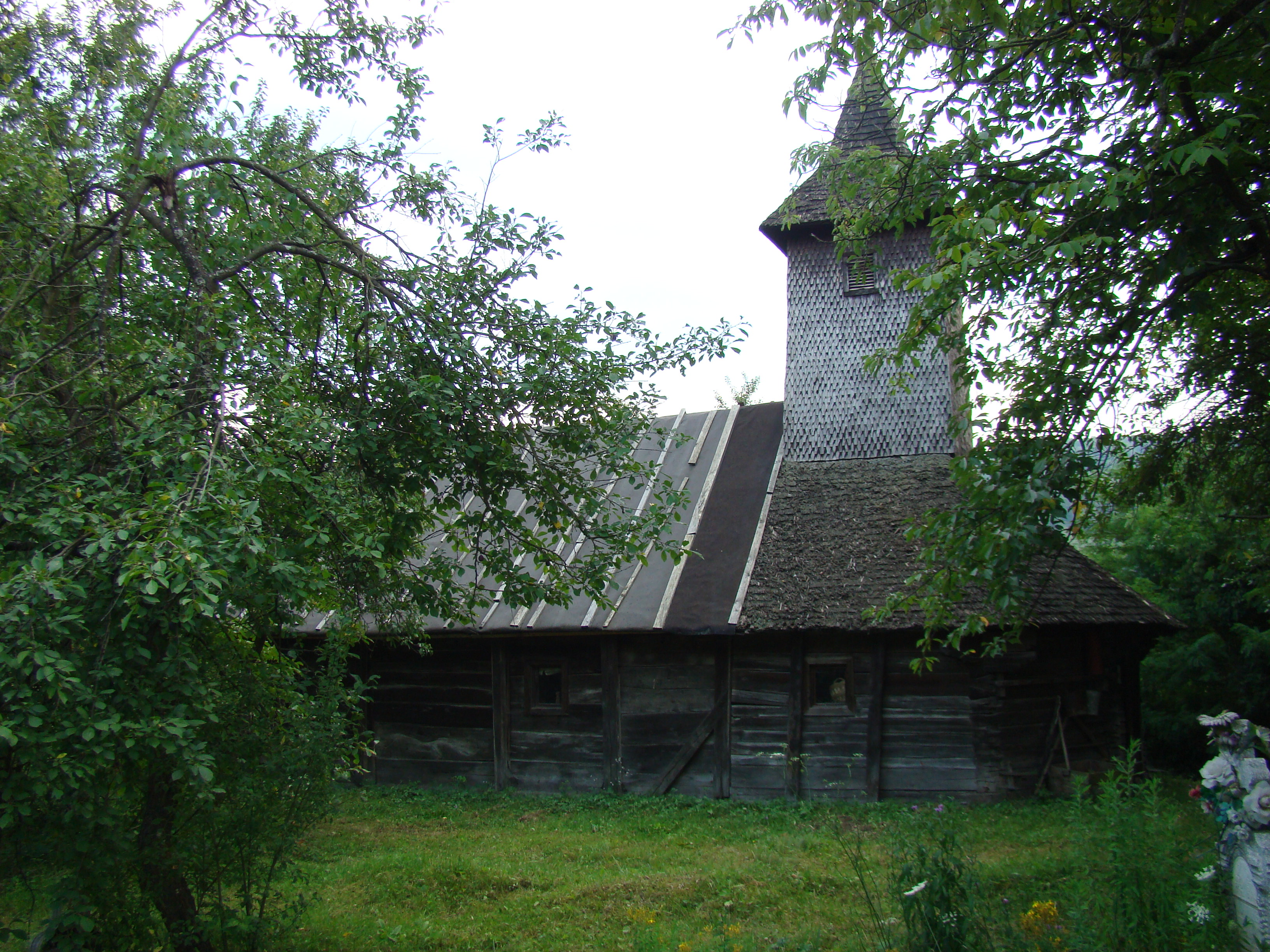
Crivina de Sus wooden church

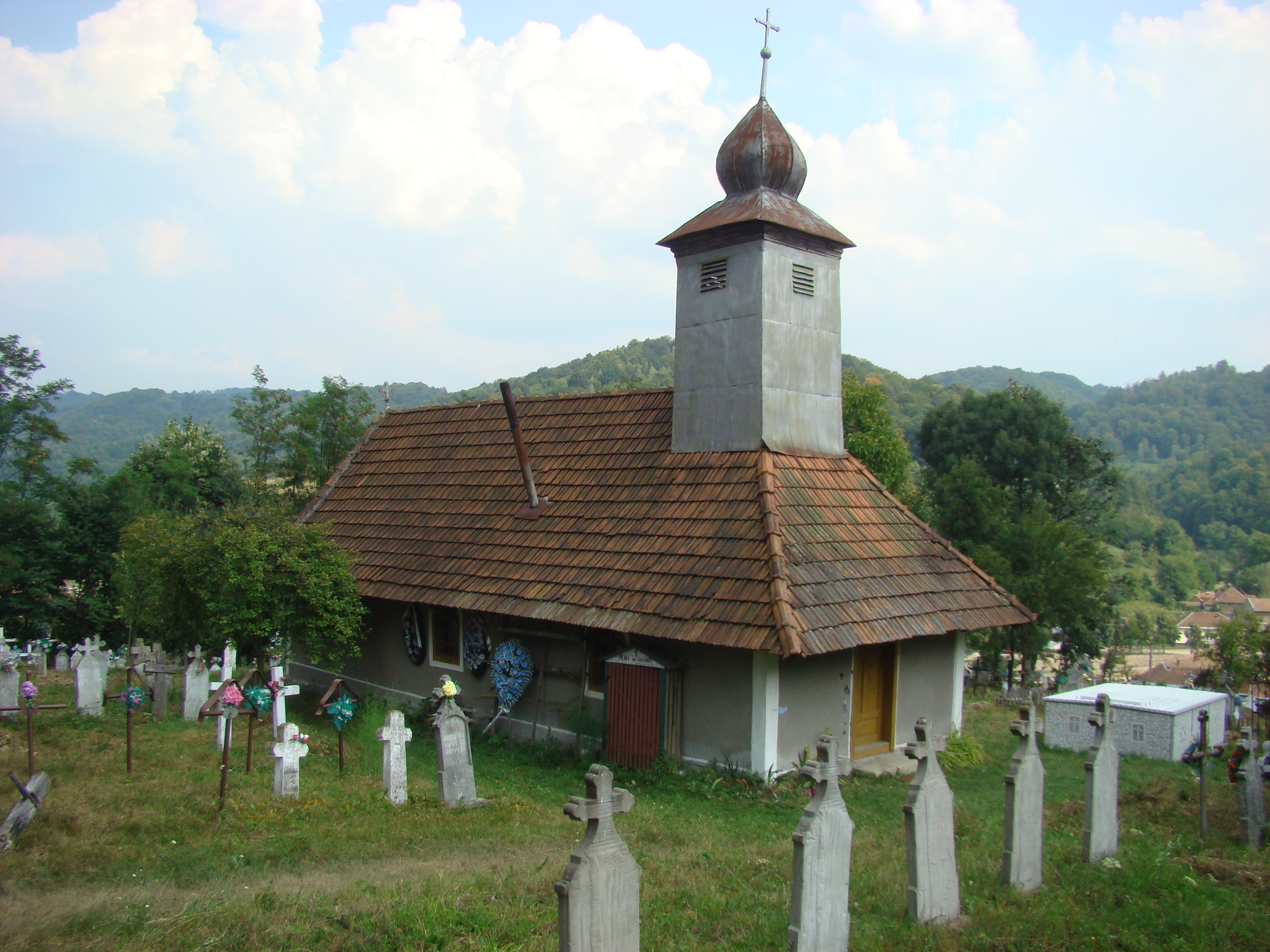
Pietroasa wooden church

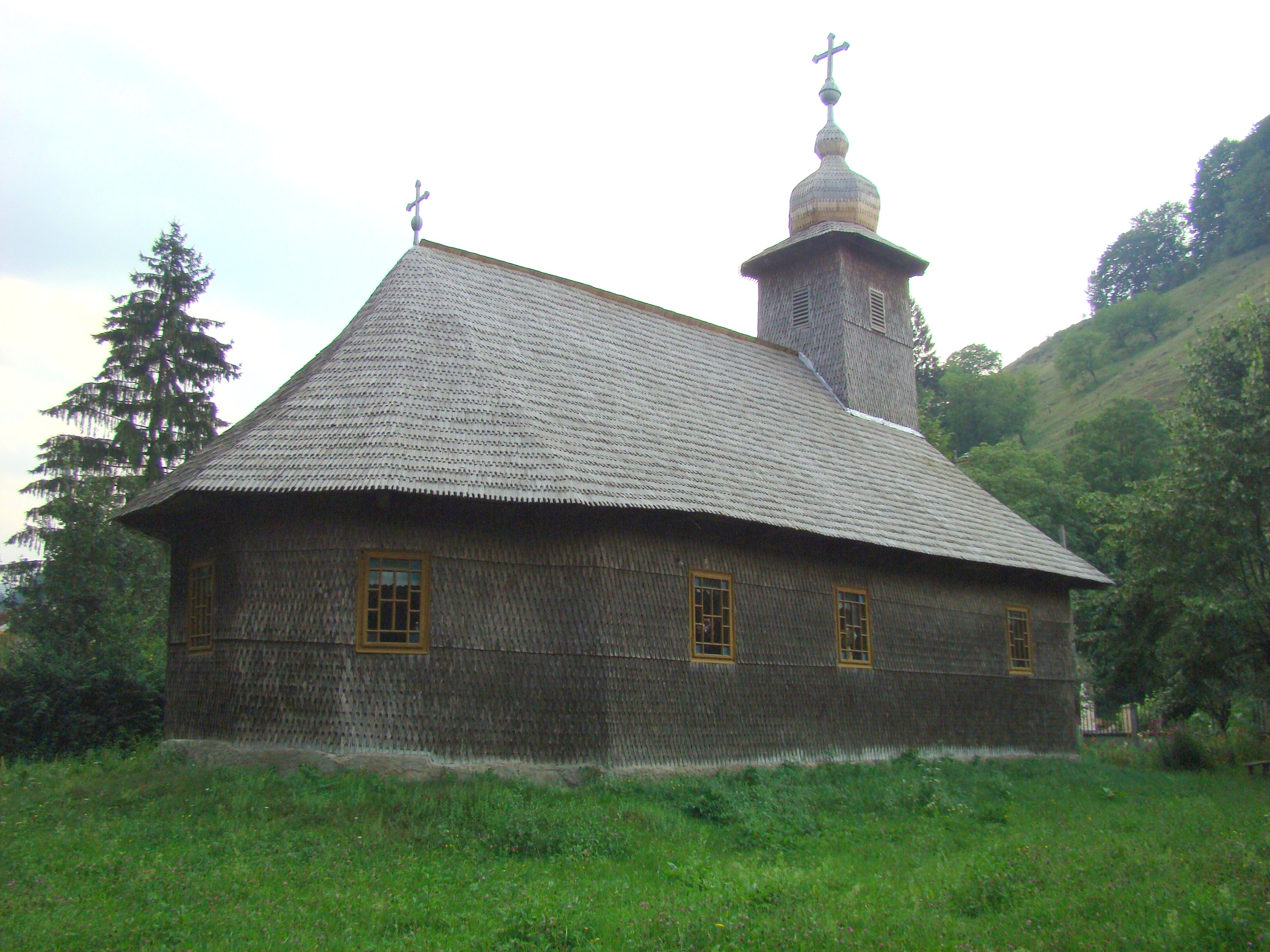
Poieni wooden church
