= Mociur =

- Location within Romania

Location
- Country: Romania
- Counties: Timiș County
- Villages: Cralovăț, Topolovățu Mare, Șuștra

Physical characteristics
- Mouth: Bega
  - location: near Șuștra
  - coordinates: 45.7688°N 21.5622°E
- Length: 16 km (9.9 mi)
- Basin size: 60 km^{2} (23 sq mi)

Basin features
- Progression: Bega→ Tisza→ Danube→ Black Sea
- Tributaries
  - right: Lipari

The Mociur is a right tributary of the river Bega in Romania. It flows into the Bega near Șuștra. Its length is 16 km (9.9 mi) and its basin size is 60 km^{2} (23 sq mi).
