= Gherteamoș =

- Location within Romania

Location
- Country: Romania
- Counties: Timiș County
- Villages: Stanciova, Herneacova, Ianova

Physical characteristics
- Mouth: Bega
  - location: Downstream of Izvin
  - coordinates: 45.7767°N 21.4237°E
- Length: 29 km (18 mi)
- Basin size: 111 km^{2} (43 sq mi)

Basin features
- Progression: Bega→ Tisza→ Danube→ Black Sea

The Gherteamoș is a right tributary of the river Bega in Romania. It discharges into the Bega near Remetea Mare. Its length is 29 km (18 mi) and its basin size is 111 km^{2} (43 sq mi).
