= Curașița =

- Location within Romania

Location
- Country: Romania
- Counties: Timiș County

Physical characteristics
- Mouth: Valea Țiganului
  - location: Recaș
  - coordinates: 45.7845°N 21.4817°E
- Length: 10 km (6.2 mi)
- Basin size: 25 km^{2} (9.7 sq mi)

Basin features
- Progression: Valea Țiganului→ Bega→ Tisza→ Danube→ Black Sea

The Curașița is a left tributary of the river Valea Țiganului in Romania. It discharges into the Valea Țiganului near Recaș. Its length is 10 km (6.2 mi) and its basin size is 25 km^{2} (9.7 sq mi).
