= Chizdia =

- Location within Romania

Location
- Country: Romania
- Counties: Arad, Timiș
- Villages: Labașinț, Coșarii, Brestovăț, Ghizela, Șanovița

Physical characteristics
- Mouth: Bega
  - location: Șanovița
  - coordinates: 45.7789°N 21.7459°E
- Length: 34 km (21 mi)
- Basin size: 233 km^{2} (90 sq mi)

Basin features
- Progression: Bega→ Tisza→ Danube→ Black Sea
- Tributaries
  - left: Hisiaș
  - right: Repaș, Hodoș

The Chizdia is a right tributary of the river Bega in Romania. It discharges into the Bega near Șanovița. Its length is 34 km (21 mi) and its basin size is 233 km^{2} (90 sq mi).
