= Ohaba Lungă =

- Commune
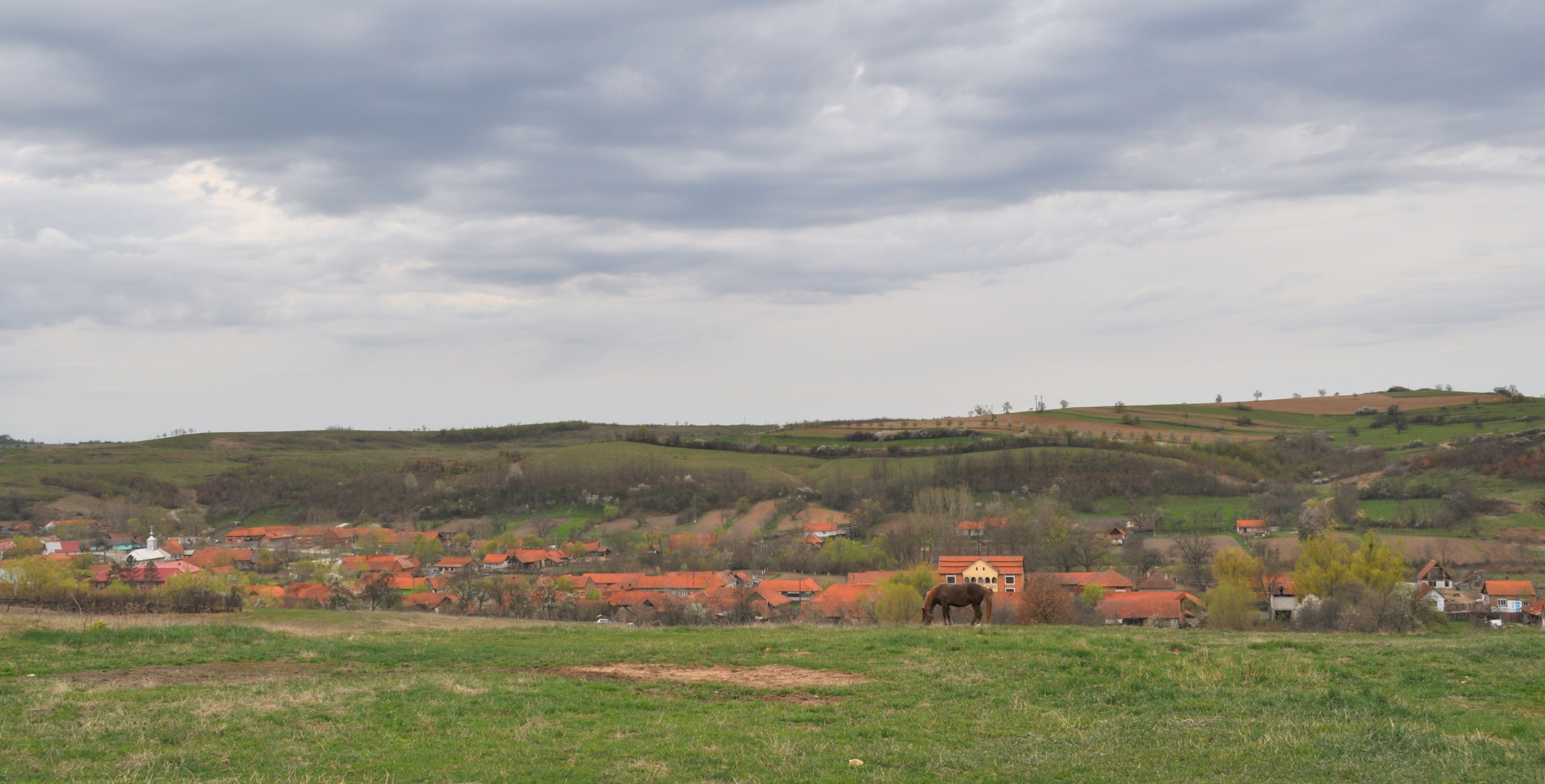
- Overview of Ohaba Lungă

- Location in Timiș County

- Location in Romania
- Coordinates: 45°54′N 21°58′E
- Country: Romania
- County: Timiș

Government
  - Mayor (2020–): Gigi Murărescu (PSD)
- Area: 104.79 km^{2} (40.46 sq mi)
- Population (2021-12-01): 904
  - Density: 8.63/km^{2} (22.3/sq mi)
- Time zone: UTC+02:00 (EET)
  - Summer (DST): UTC+03:00 (EEST)
- Postal code: 307300–307303
- Vehicle reg.: TM

Ohaba Lungă (formerly Ohaba Românească; Hungarian: Hosszúszabadi; German: Langenau) is a commune in Timiș County, Romania. It is composed of four villages: Dubești, Ierșnic, Ohaba Lungă (the commune seat), and Ohaba Română.

Ohaba Lungă is among the poorest and least populated communes in Timiș County.

== History ==
The first recorded mention of Ohaba Lungă dates from 1440. In 1447, it belonged to Arad County and was the property of Miklós Bánffy. Between 1597 and 1620, the commune passed into the successive possession of several noblemen through royal donations, including István Török and István Bethlen.

In the Ottoman defters from the late 16th and early 17th centuries, the settlement is recorded as Oláh-Ohaba (“Romanian Ohaba”), indicating the continuity of its Romanian character. By 1890, it belonged to Bálinc District and had 357 inhabitants.

== Demographics ==
Ethnic composition (2021)
1. Romanians (87.8%)
2. Roma (4.64%)
3. Others (7.53%)
Religious composition (2021)
1. Orthodox (76.9%)
2. Pentecostals (12.9%)
3. Baptists (2.32%)
4. Unknown (6.63%)
5. Others (1.23%)

According to the 2021 census, Ohaba Lungă had a population of 904 inhabitants, a decrease of 16.6% compared to the 2011 census. Most residents identified as Romanians (87.83%), with a minority of Roma (4.64%).

By religion, the majority declared themselves Orthodox (76.88%), while other significant groups included Pentecostals (12.94%) and Baptists (2.32%). For 6.63% of the population, religious affiliation was not recorded.

Census		Ethnic composition
Year	Population	Romanians	Hungarians	Germans	Roma	Ukrainians
1880	2,492	2,456	12	21	–	–
1890	2,714	2,660	29	22	–	–
1900	2,822	2,751	44	19	–	–
1910	3,167	2,971	44	121	–	–
1920	2,855	2,807	10	34	–	–
1930	3,048	2,873	5	60	103	–
1941	3,130	2,970	2	30	–
1956	2,744	2,646	8	3	87	–
1966	2,221	2,193	6	5	–	–
1977	1,681	1,647	2	1	24	7
1992	1,347	1,279	2	1	8	57
2002	1,225	1,168	10	–	35	12
2011	1,084	1,007	3	–	12	25
2021	904	794	–	–	42	9

== Politics and administration ==
The commune of Ohaba Lungă is administered by a mayor and a local council composed of 9 councilors. The mayor, Gigi Murărescu, from the Social Democratic Party, has been in office since 2020. As from the 2024 local elections, the local council has the following composition by political parties:

Party	Seats	Composition
Social Democratic Party	4	
Save Romania Union–People's Movement Party–Force of the Right	3	
Alliance for the Union of Romanians	1	
Union of the Ukrainians of Romania	1	

== Gallery ==
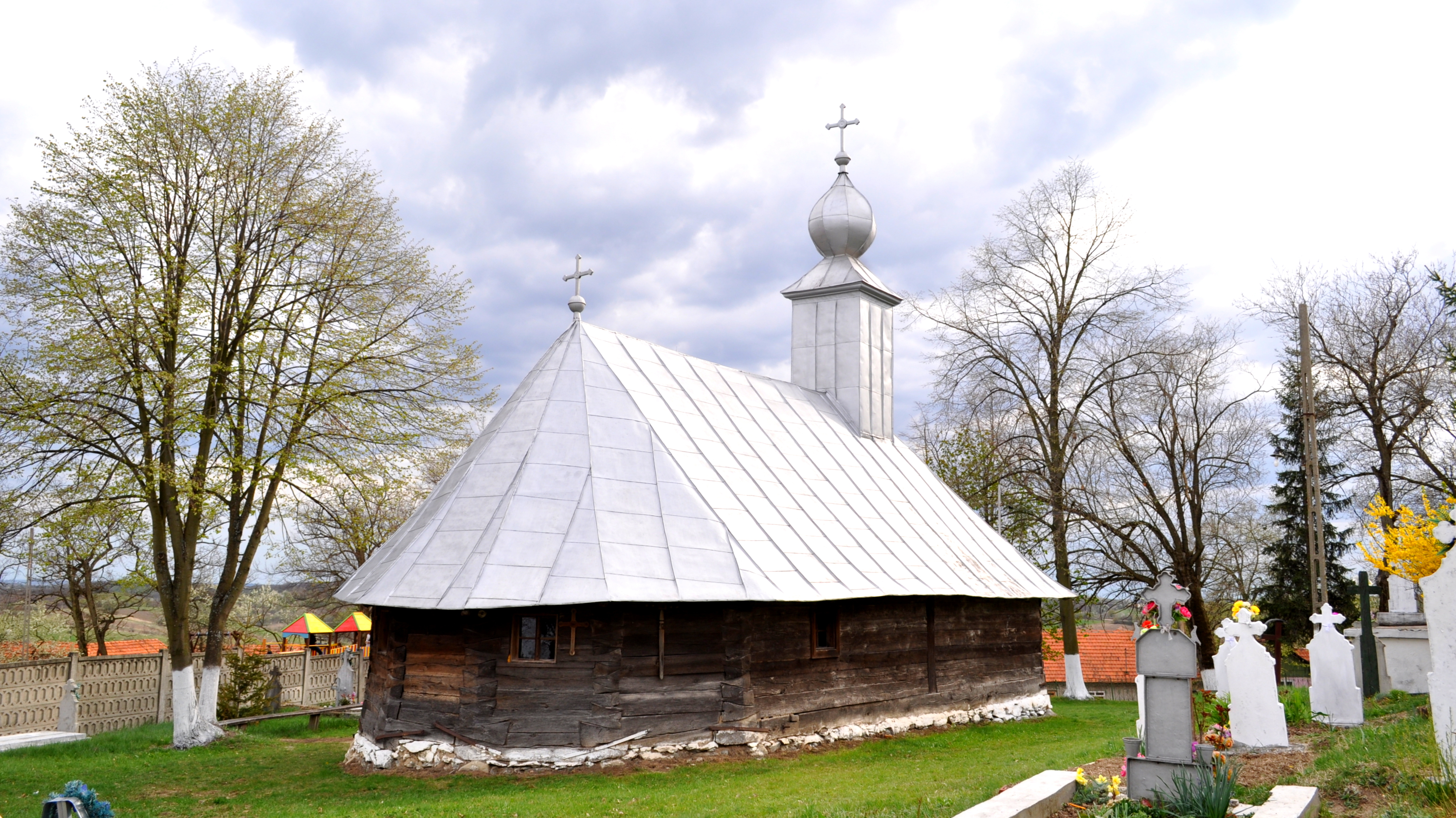
Wooden church in Dubești

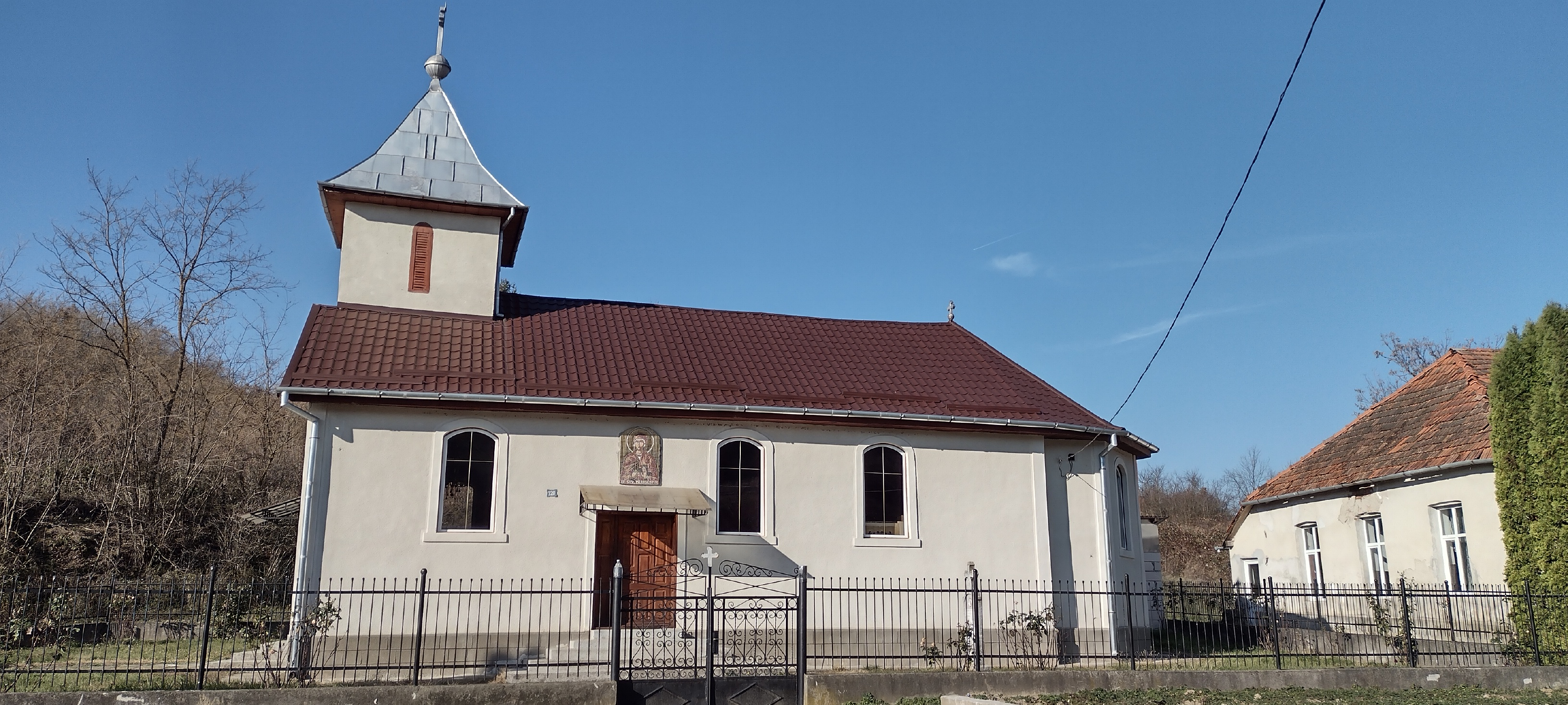
St. Paraskeva Orthodox church in Ierșnic

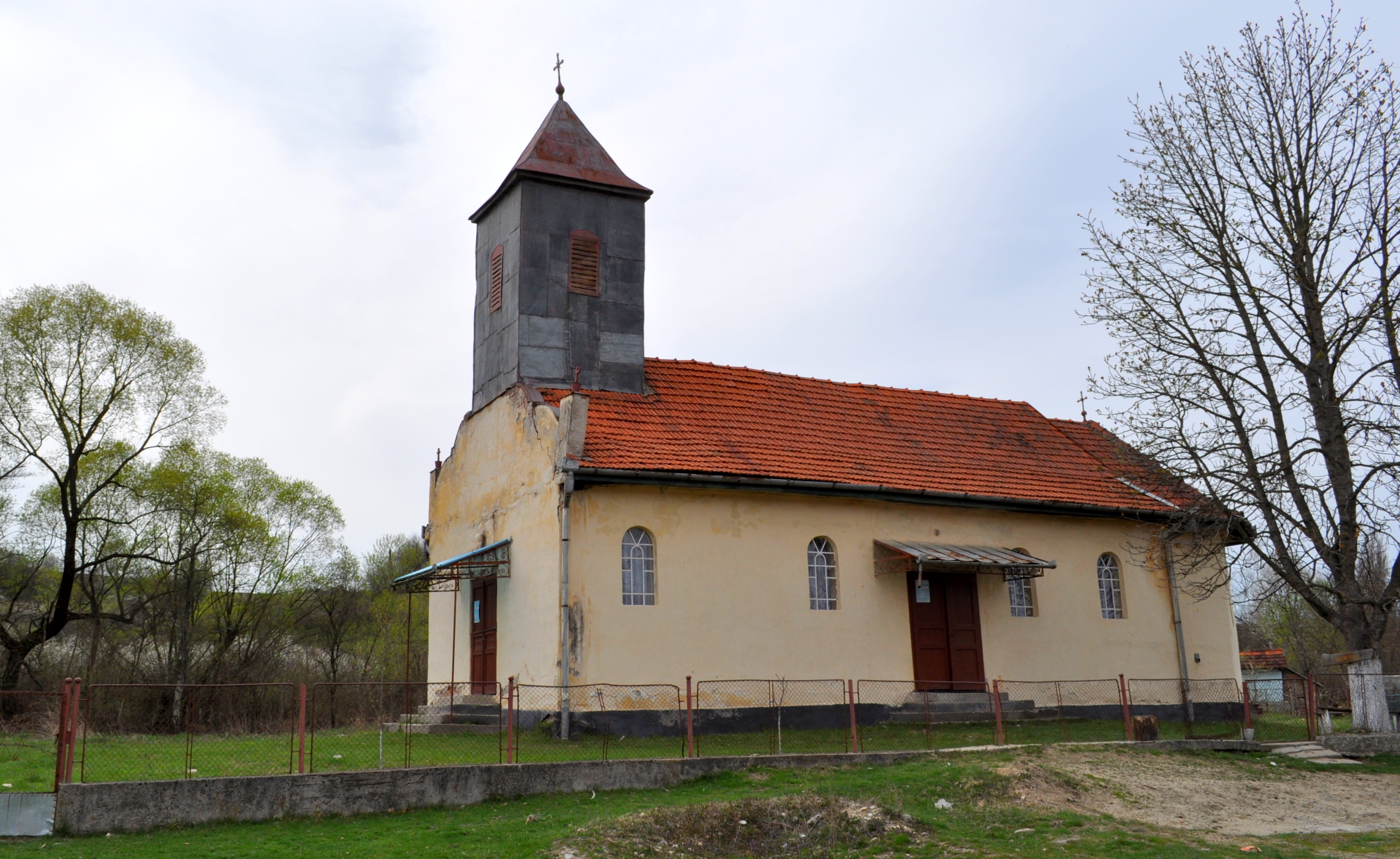
Church in Ohaba Română
