= Topolovățu Mare =

- Commune
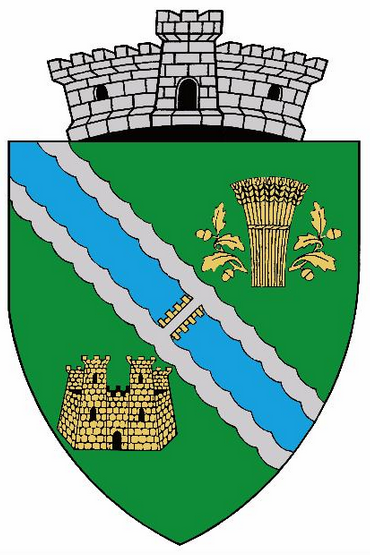
- Coat of arms

- Location in Timiș County

- Location in Romania
- Coordinates: 45°46′N 21°37′E
- Country: Romania
- County: Timiș

Government
  - Mayor (2016–): Ovidiu-Petru Doța (PNL)
- Area: 99.88 km^{2} (38.56 sq mi)
- Population (2021-12-01): 2,576
  - Density: 26/km^{2} (67/sq mi)
- Time zone: EET/EEST (UTC+2/+3)
- Postal code: 307420–307426
- Vehicle reg.: TM
- Website: www.primariatopolovatumare.ro

Topolovățu Mare (Hungarian: Nagytopoly; German: Großtoplowetz; Serbian: Велики Тополовац, romanized: Veliki Topolovac; Slovak: Veľký Topolovac) is a commune in Timiș County, Romania. It is composed of six villages: Cralovăț, Ictar-Budinț, Iosifalău, Șuștra, Topolovățu Mare (commune seat), and Topolovățu Mic.

== Etymology ==
Topolovățu Mare originates from the Slavic noun topolu, meaning "poplar tree," combined with the Romanian adjective mare, meaning "great" or "big."

== History ==
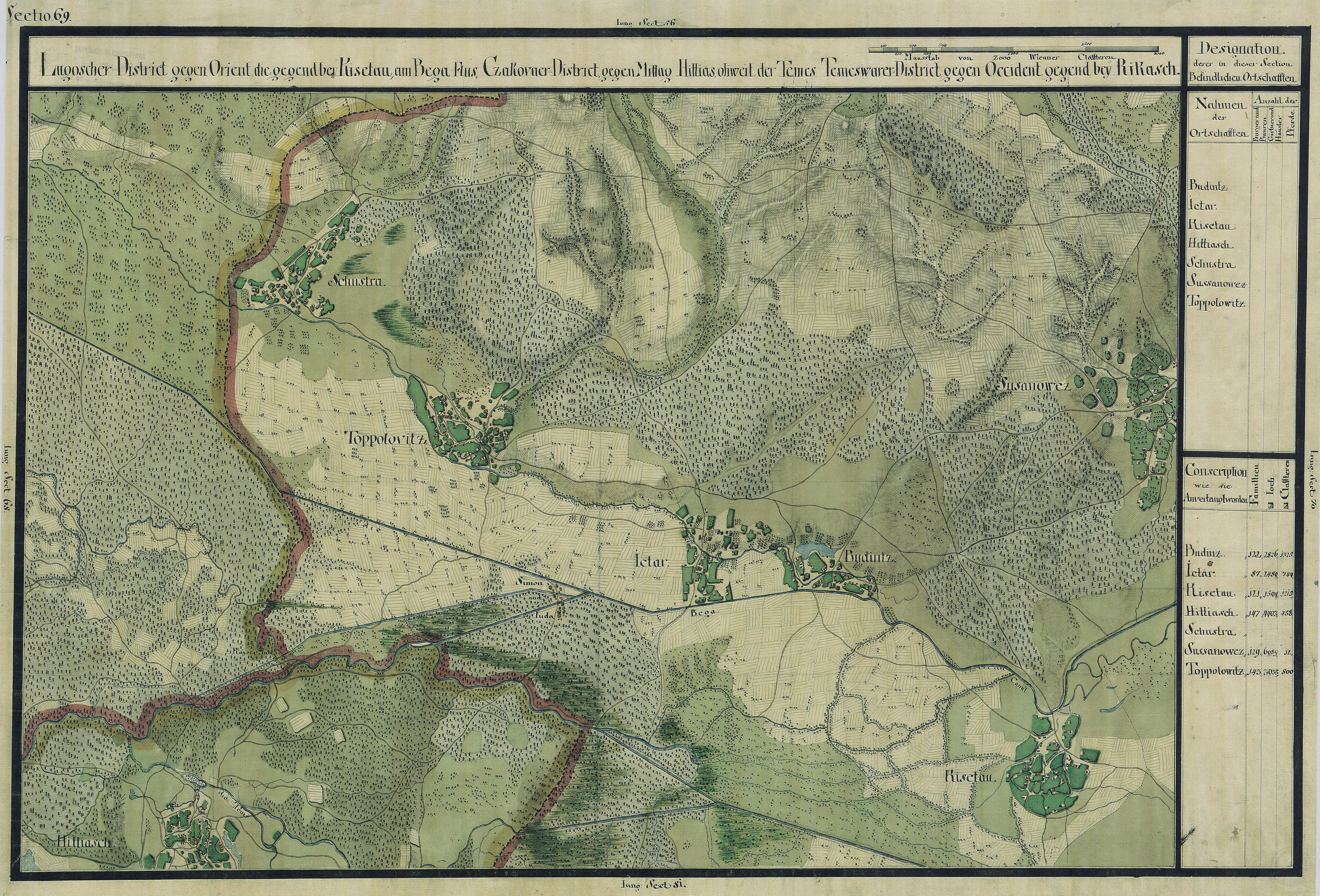
Topolovăț (Toppolovitz) on the Josephinische Landesaufnahme of 1769–1772

Until recently, the first recorded mention of Topolovățu Mare was considered to date from 1717, with the mention that it was most likely established during the Turkish occupation. More recent research, published in the Monograph of Topolovăț commune, published under the coordination of Viorel Boldureanu, shows that the locality is mentioned in a Turkish defter from 1554, with the name Topolovăț. The same source supports the hypothesis that the village moved to the nearby hill and took the name Kustelek (the toponym still exists today), which appears in a deed of donation of Sigismund Báthory in 1597.

After the expulsion of the Turks from Banat, the Austrians found the village of Topolovac with 40 houses on the current site. In the meantime, the village had descended to the roads in the valley and stabilized as a settlement at the crossroads between the Timișoara–Lugoj road and the old road leading from Buziaș to Lipova. From the time of the Turks, there would have been a stop for stagecoaches here and it is known that in 1767 there was a post office here. At the same time, there was a tax office here, which indicates the importance of the locality.

Started in 1728, the works on the Bega Canal advanced in time upstream of Timișoara. When it was found that navigation on the canal was negatively affected by the oscillation of water flow, Dutch engineer Maximilian Emmanuel Fremaut, who designed the Bega Canal, proposed the construction of technical nodes to be located at Topolovăț and Coștei, in order to connect Timiș and Bega and to allow the transfer of water between the two rivers. At the same time, the nodes would have improved the land and prevented flooding. Therefore, the construction of the hydrotechnical node at Topolovăț began in 1758 and was completed in 1760, in a record time. The node is a unique engineering monument for that period and has functioned to this day. In order to ensure the labor force, the labor colonies from Coșteiu Mic (for the node at Coștei) and Topolovățu Mic (for the note at Topolovăț) were established then. The colony was located on the left bank of the Bega and is attested as a village in 1783. In fact, its inhabitants were also Romanians from Topolovățu Mare, as evidenced by ethnographic research, by the very close family ties that exist today and the cultural similarities.

In 1828, Topolovățu Mare was officially separated from Topolovățu Mic as two separate entities. In the local language, the mononym Topolovăț for Topolovățu Mare has been kept, while Topolovățu Mic is called Sămăiuda. Until 1848 Topolovățu Mare was a property of the Aerarium. It has developed as a stopping point on the road that connected Timișoara with Lugoj, especially after the construction of the railway.

== Demographics ==
Ethnic composition (2021)
1. Romanians (81.4%)
2. Serbs (3.02%)
3. Roma (2.91%)
4. Slovaks (1.97%)
5. Others (10.7%)
Religious composition (2021)
1. Orthodox (75.3%)
2. Pentecostals (8.26%)
3. Roman Catholics (4.27%)
4. Unknown (9.89%)
5. Others (2.24%)

Topolovățu Mare had a population of 2,576 inhabitants at the 2021 census, up 0.07% from the 2011 census. Most inhabitants are Romanians (81.4%), larger minorities being represented by Serbs (3.02%), Roma (2.91%) and Slovaks (1.97%). By religion, most inhabitants are Orthodox (75.34%), but there are also minorities of Pentecostals (8.26%) and Roman Catholics (4.27%). For 9.89% of the population, religious affiliation is unknown.

Census		Ethnic composition
Year	Population	Romanians	Hungarians	Germans	Roma	Serbs	Slovaks
1880	5,277	4,182	107	139	–	769	8
1890	6,344	4,109	89	1,317	–	781	6
1900	6,528	4,052	164	1,440	–	813	8
1910	6,244	3,899	299	1,171	–	786	–
1920	5,553	3,612	168	978	–	–	–
1930	5,247	3,393	150	827	147	702	8
1941	5,191	3,221	117	825	–	–	–
1956	4,642	3,102	100	612	182	626	18
1966	4,455	3,144	99	523	56	616	13
1977	4,140	3,100	90	336	25	537	46
1992	3,150	2,587	71	30	27	292	107
2002	2,971	2,510	62	28	37	220	91
2011	2,574	2,177	30	13	51	140	64
2021	2,576	2,097	18	4	75	78	51

== Politics and administration ==
The commune of Topolovățu Mare is administered by a mayor and a local council composed of 11 councilors. The mayor, Ovidiu-Petru Doța, from the National Liberal Party, has been in office since 2016. As from the 2024 local elections, the local council has the following composition by political parties:

Party	Seats	Composition
National Liberal Party	3	
Alliance for the Union of Romanians	3	
Force of the Right	3	
Social Democratic Party	1	
Save Romania Union	1	

== Notable people ==
- Lucian Georgevici (1875–1940), lawyer and politician
- Dorina Emilia Carbune (b. 1985), handballer
