= Bethausen =

- Commune
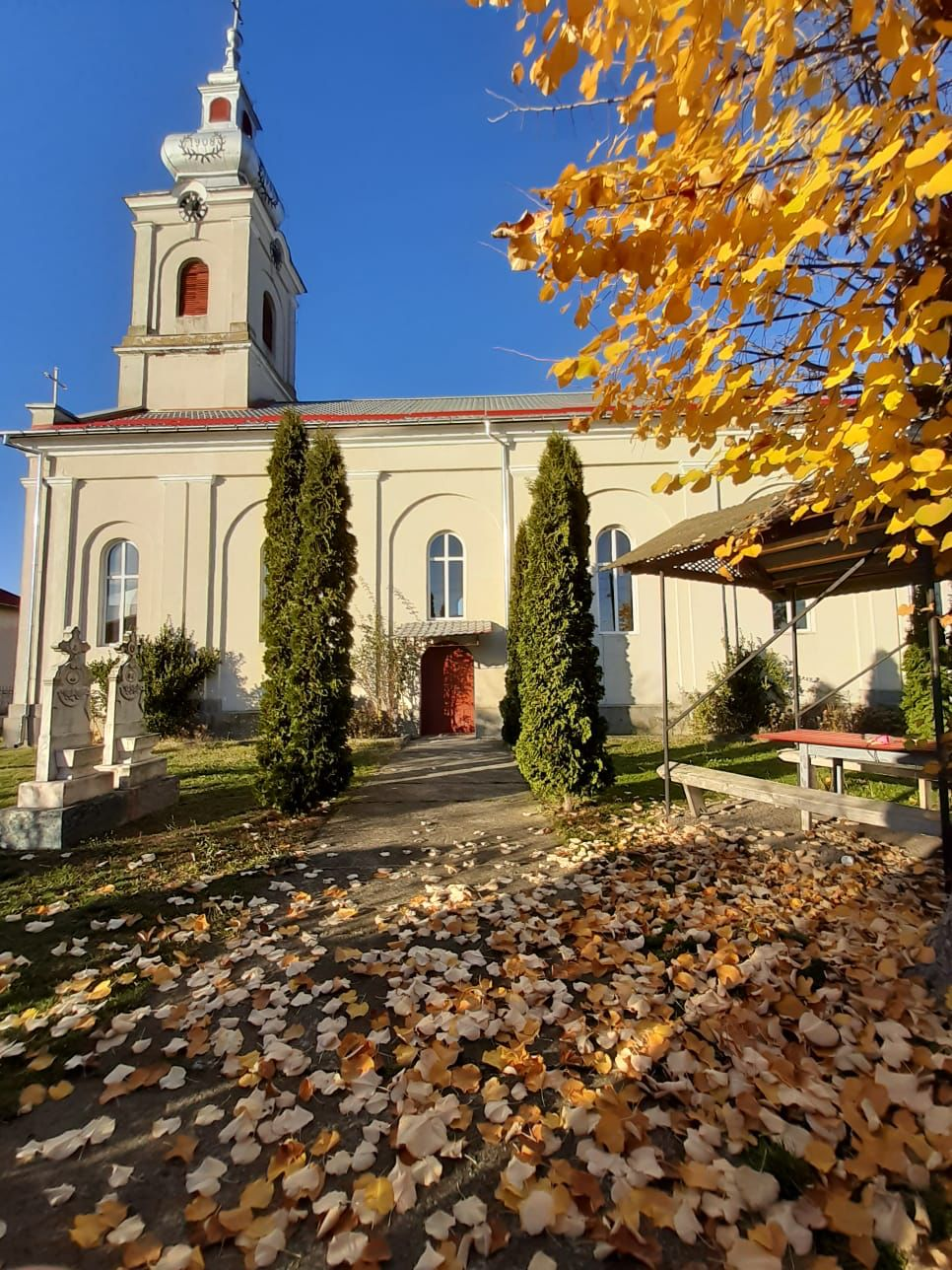
- The church in Cliciova

- Location in Timiș County

- Location in Romania
- Coordinates: 45°50′N 21°57′E
- Country: Romania
- County: Timiș

Government
  - Mayor (2008–): Ioan Lihoni (PNL)
- Area: 90.27 km^{2} (34.85 sq mi)
- Population (2021-12-01): 2,908
  - Density: 32.21/km^{2} (83.44/sq mi)
- Time zone: UTC+02:00 (EET)
  - Summer (DST): UTC+03:00 (EEST)
- Postal code: 307050–307053
- Vehicle reg.: TM
- Website: www.primariabethausen.ro

Bethausen (Hungarian: Bethlenháza; German: Bethausen; Banat Swabian: Pettlenhaas; formerly Romanianized as Becliza) is a commune in Timiș County, Romania. It is composed of six villages: Bethausen (commune seat), Cladova, Cliciova, Cutina, Leucușești and Nevrincea.

== Geography ==
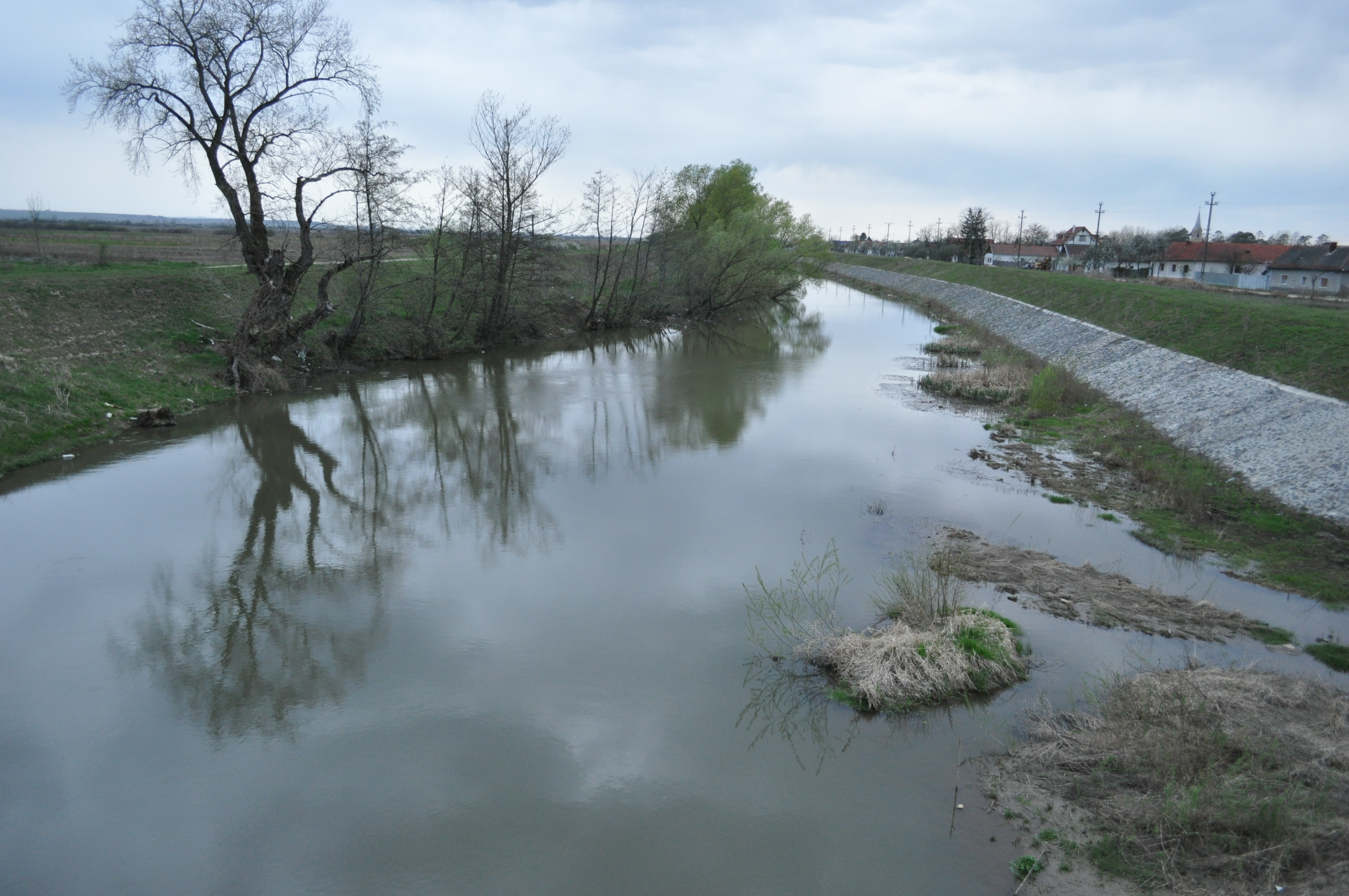
Bega River in Bethausen

Bethausen is located in the northeast of Timiș County, on the right bank of Bega River, 26 km (16 mi) from Lugoj and 20 km (12 mi) from Făget.

The relief is characterized by the predominance of the smooth surfaces of the Banat Plain, which extends as a gulf into the hills on Bega Valley. In the north, the commune's territory includes the last extensions of the Lipova Piedmont, and in the southeast the Făget Hills, located at the foot of the Poiana Ruscă Massif, from which they are separated by a chain of contact micro-depressions.

The climate has a temperate character, with warm summers, not-too-cold winters, quite early springs and sometimes very long autumns.

The vegetation is rich in species. The plains and the meadows are used for various crops: wheat, barley, oat, maize, cabbage, melons, potatoes, orchards, etc. The commune's territory is part of the vegetation area of deciduous forests (Turkey oak, Hungarian oak, sessile oak, field maple, ash, black locust, etc.).

== History ==
=== Bethausen ===
Bethausen is one of the youngest villages in Banat. It was founded in 1883 by colonization with Germans coming from Zichandorf, on the hearth of the former Romanian village Becliza or Betlinești. Germans gave it the name Bethausen, after the old name Betlinești; Hungarians called it Bethlenháza ("Bethlen's house"), and Romanians Becliza. In 1884 they built a Roman Catholic church here. By 1890 the commune was part of the district of Belinț. Until 1990 it was a predominantly German locality, but after the Germans' exodus to Germany, the Romanians became the majority.

=== Cladova ===
The earliest documented mention of the village dates back to 1308, when it was recorded under the name Kaladwa. Although historical information is limited, available evidence suggests that the settlement has been continuously inhabited by a Romanian population and persisted through the period of Ottoman rule. A 1501 Turkish defter refers to a settlement named Kalothoa, likely a mistranscription of the original name. After 1700, it became known as Kladova, and in 1921, following the unification of Banat with Romania, the village adopted its current name.

=== Cliciova ===
The village is first mentioned in 1454, when John Hunyadi received ownership as a donation from King Ladislaus V. During the medieval period, the settlement frequently changed hands among members of the nobility, as recorded in various property and donation documents. By 1596, it appears under the name Klachova and is listed as part of Hunedoara County. That same year, Sigismund Báthory granted the village, along with other estates, to István Jósika. In addition to these noble proprietors, several serfs are also mentioned in the records, including Lupșa Vițan, Iancu Goda, and Nicolae Zenta. Further documents reveal that during the Ottoman occupation of Banat, the village was successively granted to Voivode Sigismund Báthory, then to György Szentmiklóssy and János Apponyi.

According to the census conducted between 1690 and 1700, near the end of Ottoman rule, the village was part of the Făget district. Following the Austrian conquest of Banat in 1717, it appears under the name Klisko, with a recorded total of 30 households. The local church was constructed later, in 1899.

During the interwar period, the village was administratively part of Severin County, within the Belinț area. At that time, it had an active male choir, a national cultural center, a school library, and a dedicated public library. The latter was established through the generous donation of university professor Iosif Popovici, a native of Cliciova, who contributed 1,200 valuable volumes from his personal collection.

Throughout all historical periods, the population has consistently been Romanian.

=== Cutina ===
The village of Cutina is first documented in 1440, under the names Gwthonia or Bwthonia. Throughout the Middle Ages, its name appears repeatedly in various forms, gradually evolving into its present version. When the Austrians took control of Banat in 1717, Cutina was still inhabited, with 20 houses recorded—unlike many other settlements that had been abandoned either due to conflict or over time. A particularly unusual event is noted by historian Ioan Lotreanu in his Monograph of Banat, who writes that in 1780, "for more than a year, the land here burned for no one knows why, until it was extinguished by some heavy rains."

Between 1898 and 1900, the present-day church was constructed on the site of an earlier wooden church, whose age remains unknown. In 1913, during Hungarian administration, the village was known as Gutonya. It was only after the unification of Banat with Romania that it adopted its Romanian name. During the communist era, the village experienced a gradual decline, primarily due to a decreasing population.

=== Leucușești ===
The earliest documented reference to Leucușești dates back to 1440, during the Middle Ages, when King Vladislav I granted the village, along with the Șoimoș Fortress to which it was affiliated, to Ioan and Mihai Orszag. At that time, the village was known by its Hungarian name, Lekesfalva, meaning "Lekes's village." It is subsequently mentioned in various property records from 1514–1516 and again in 1612, reflecting its transfer among noble families. Between 1690 and 1700, it appears under the name Leoculestj and was part of the Făget district. By the 1727 census, the village had 30 houses and was recorded as Legutschesche.

The village shifted its location several times throughout its history. It is certain that the old wooden church was relocated at least twice, likely along with the village itself. Initially, it stood in an area known as "La vale de biserică," then it was moved to a spot called "La dud." Finally, around 1810, it was relocated to the site where the current church stands. The old wooden church was demolished in 1880, and in its place, a new brick church was constructed between 1880 and 1881. The new church retained the same patron saint as the original: The Assumption of the Virgin Mary.

=== Nevrincea ===
The earliest recorded mention of the locality dates back to 1371, when it was known as Neuinche. Its existence is confirmed by several medieval documents, including one from 1480, which mentions a certain Ștefan Cherbyk de Newrynche participating in the formal acquisition of an estate in the Lugoj district. Additionally, it is known that during the Middle Ages, there was a nearby village named Csura or Chure, which has since disappeared.

== Demographics ==
Ethnic composition (2021)
1. Romanians (87.9%)
2. Ukrainians (5.67%)
3. Hungarians (1.20%)
4. Unknown (4.16%)
5. Others (1.05%)
Religious composition (2021)
1. Orthodox (76.8%)
2. Pentecostals (13.8%)
3. Adventists (1.71%)
4. Roman Catholics (1.71%)
5. Unknown (4.67%)
6. Others (1.35%)

Bethausen had a population of 2,908 inhabitants at the 2021 census, down 4.87% from the 2011 census. Most inhabitants are Romanians (87.92%), larger minorities being represented by Ukrainians (5.67%) and Hungarians (1.2%). For 4.16% of the population, ethnicity is unknown. By religion, most inhabitants are Orthodox (76.78%), but there are also minorities of Pentecostals (13.78%), Adventists (1.71%) and Roman Catholics (1.71%). For 4.67% of the population, religious affiliation is unknown.

Census		Ethnic composition
Year	Population	Romanians	Hungarians	Germans	Ukrainians
1880	3,288	3,155	17	46	–
1890	4,112	3,459	108	452	–
1900	4,877	3,730	280	701	–
1910	5,448	3,954	764	638	–
1920	5,244	3,866	764	588	–
1930	4,954	3,693	569	584	–
1941	4,863	3,729	560	479	–
1956	4,430	3,508	489	345	2
1966	4,014	3,481	275	253	–
1977	3,474	3,094	136	201	21
1992	2,909	2,743	71	51	36
2002	3,033	2,796	62	18	152
2011	3,057	2,781	38	14	148
2021	2,908	2,557	35	8	165

== Politics and administration ==
The commune of Bethausen is administered by a mayor and a local council composed of 10 councilors. The mayor, Ioan Lihoni, from the National Liberal Party, has been in office since 2008. As from the 2024 local elections, the local council has the following composition by political parties:

Party	Seats	Composition
National Liberal Party	2	
Force of the Right	2	
Social Liberal Humanist Party	1	
Alliance for the Union of Romanians	1	
Romanian National Conservative Party	1	
People's Movement Party	1	
Social Democratic Party	1	
Save Romania Union	1	

== Notable people ==
- Dumitru Neda (1893–1956), theologian, professor and journalist
- Elena Sintescu (b. 1948), Banat folk music performer

== Gallery ==
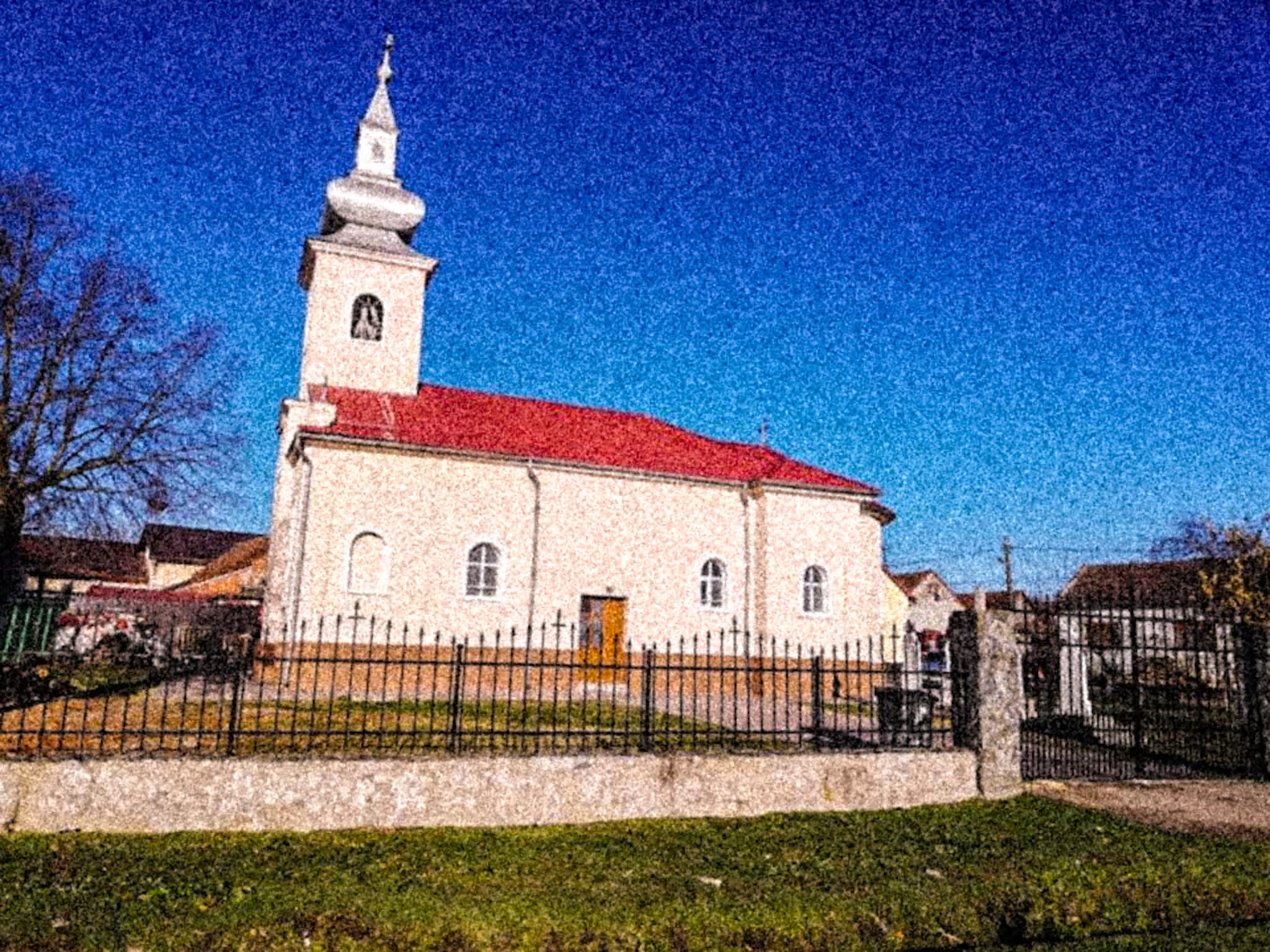
Orthodox Church in Cladova

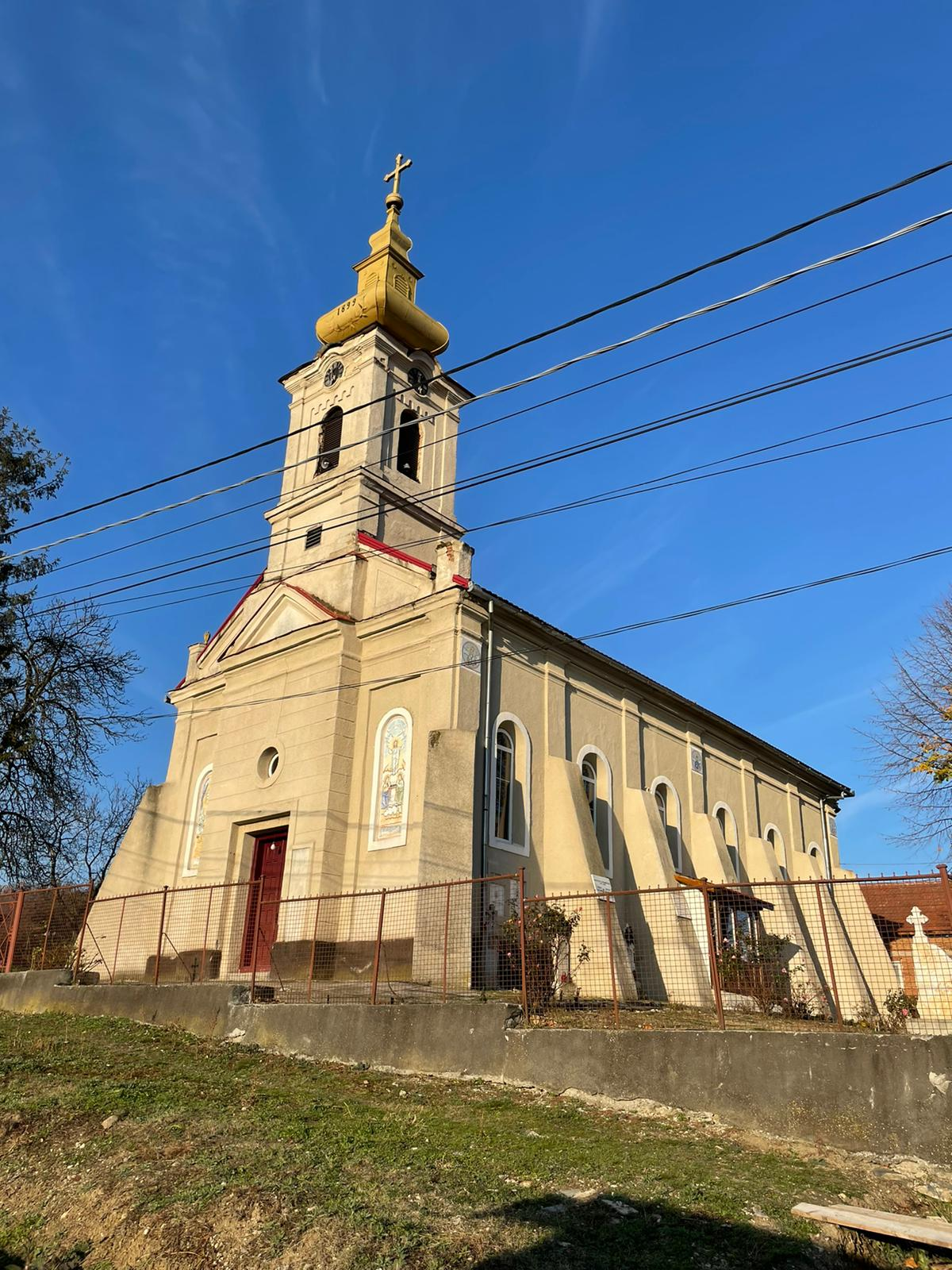
Orthodox Church in Cutina

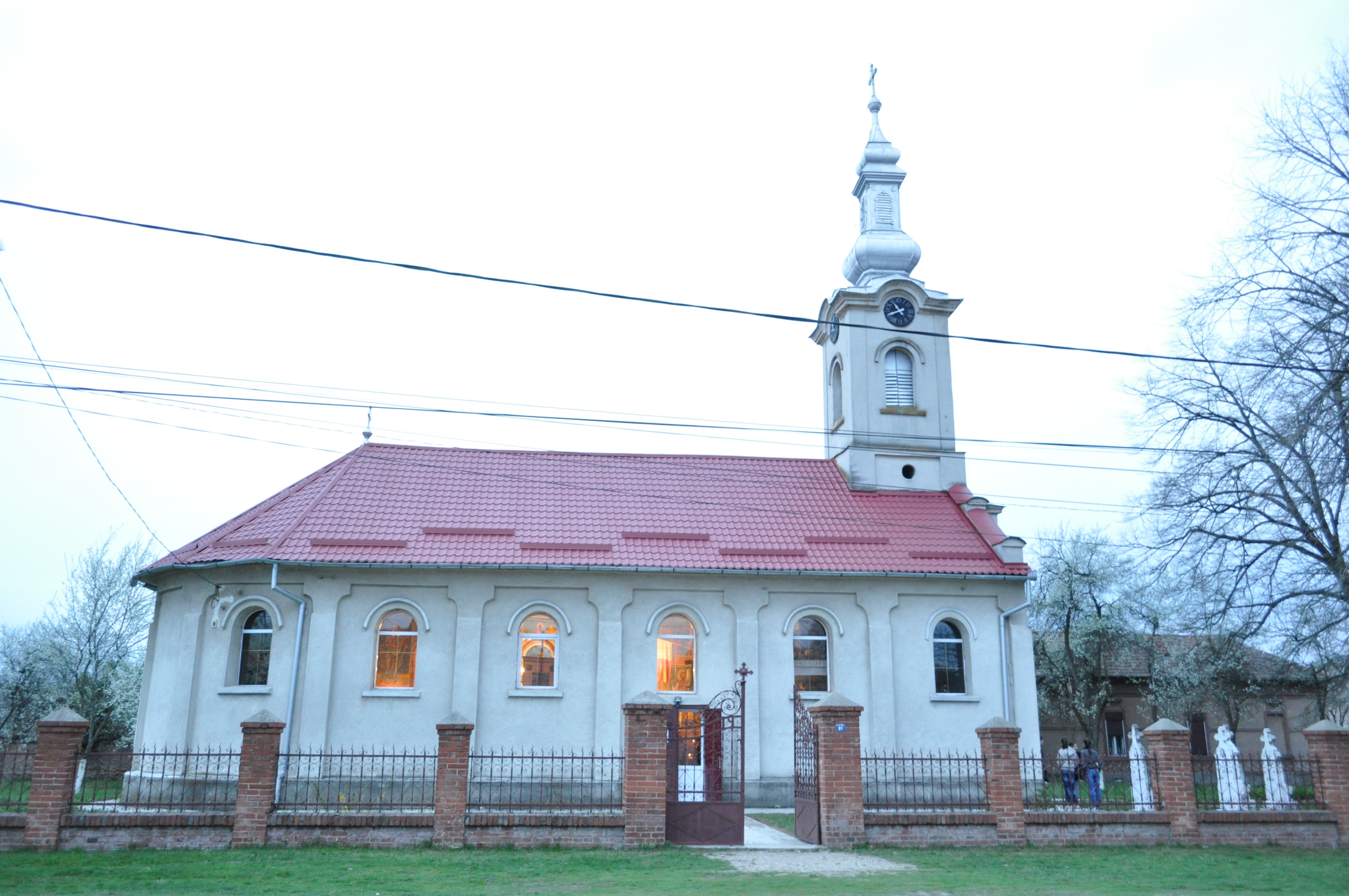
Orthodox Church in Leucușești

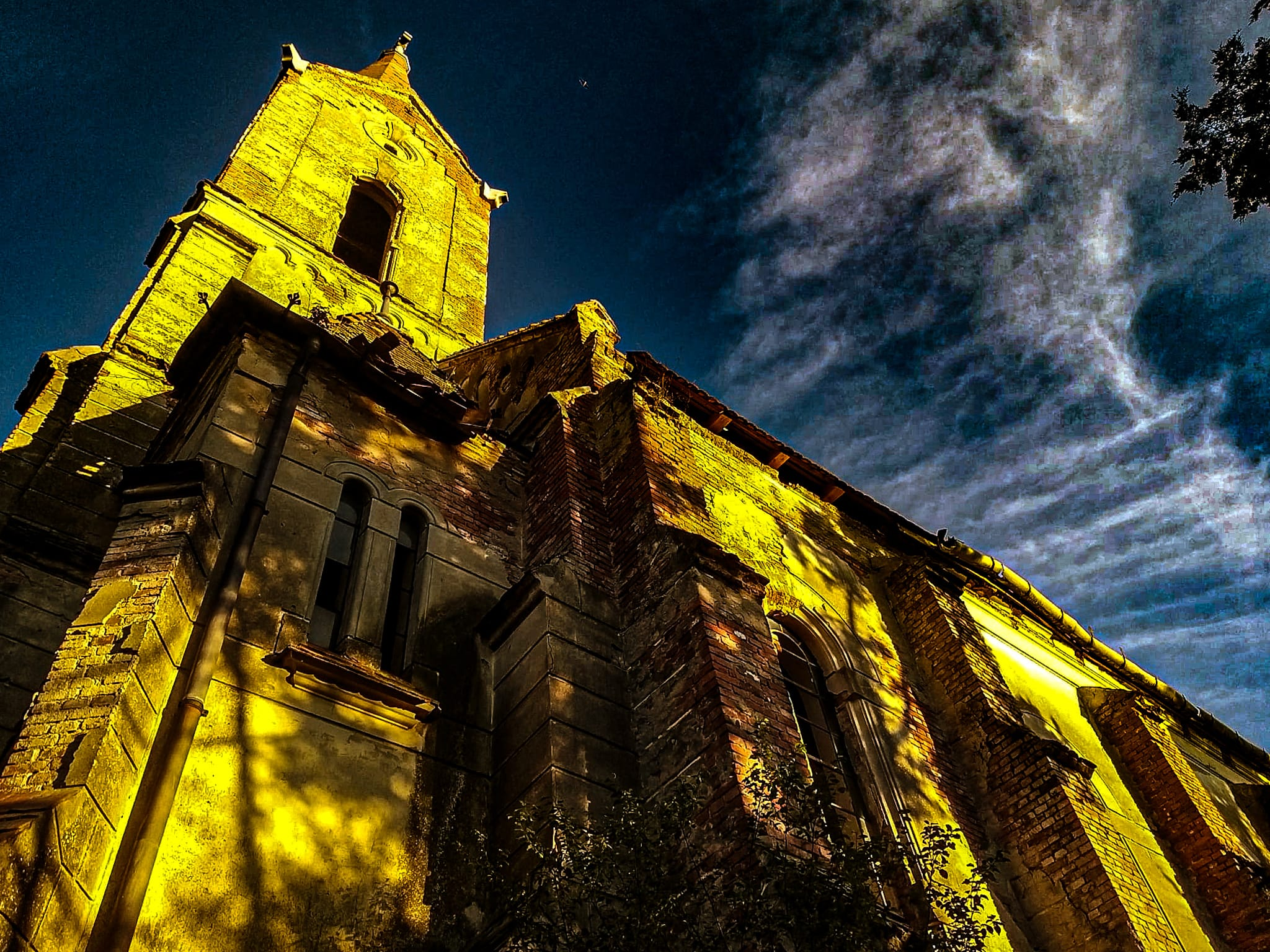
Roman Catholic Church in Nevrincea
