= Bega (Tisza) =

Bega Begej
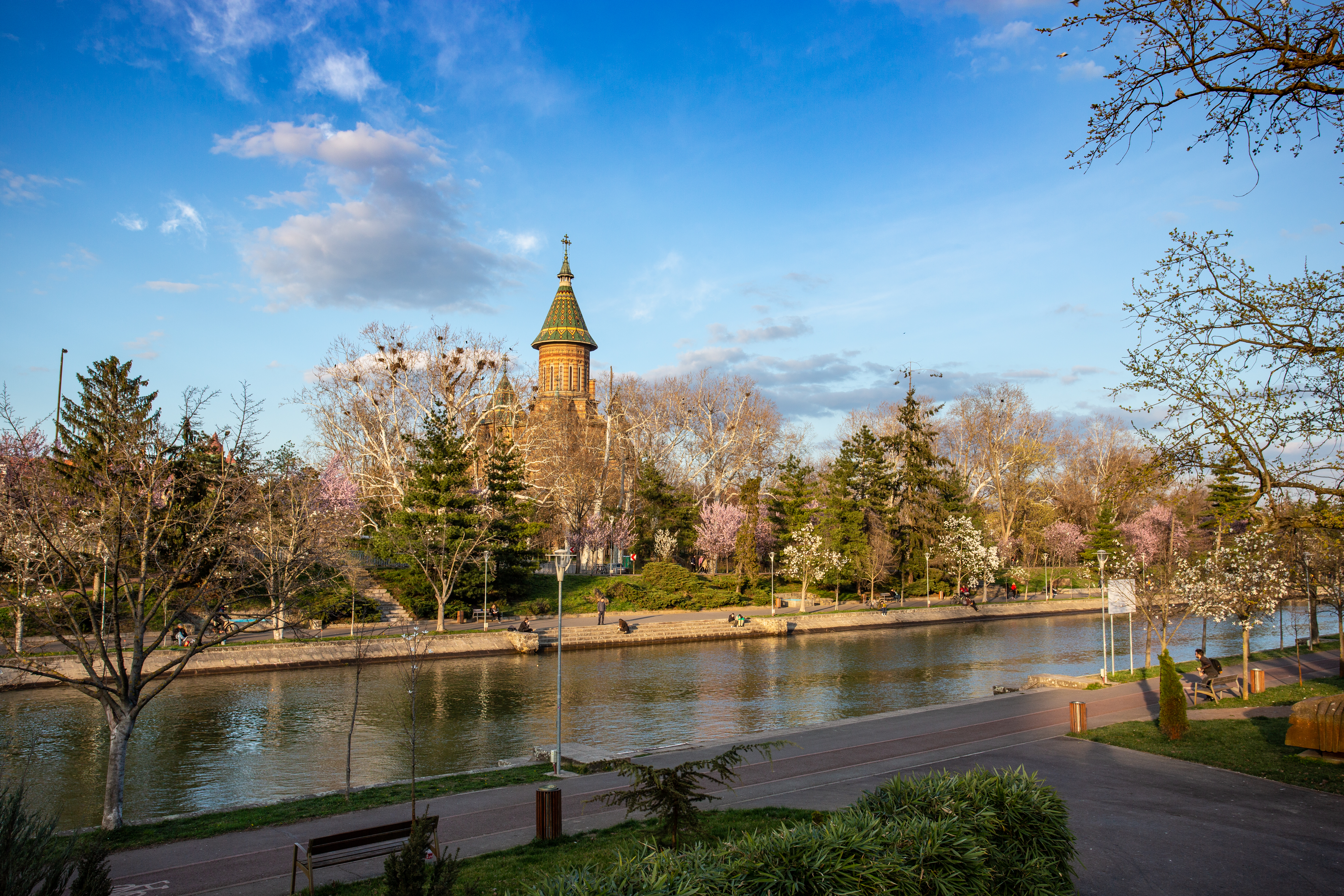
- Bega River in Timișoara

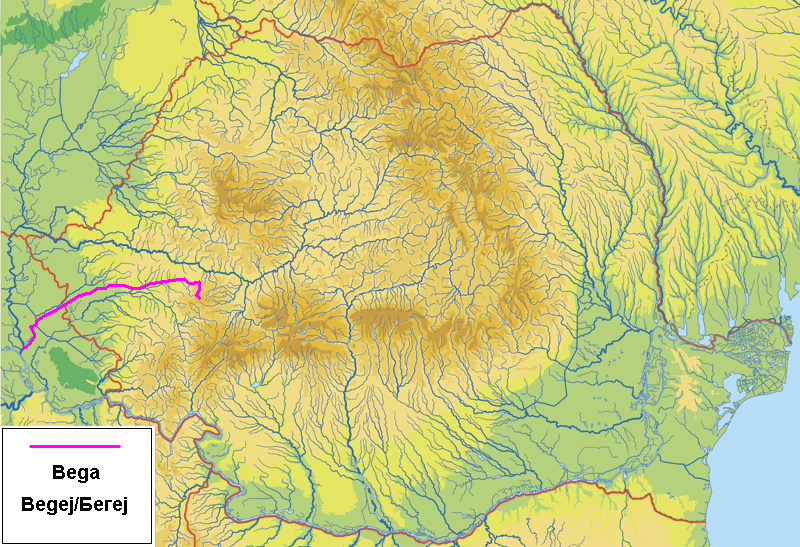
- Native name: Bega (Romanian); Бегеј / Begej (Serbian)

Location
- Countries: Romania; Serbia
- Towns: Romania: Făget; Recaș; Timișoara; Serbia: Zrenjanin; Ečka

Physical characteristics
- Source: Confluence of headwaters Bega Luncanilor and Bega Poienilor
  - location: Poiana Ruscă Mountains, Romania
- Mouth: Tisa river near Titel, Serbia
  - coordinates: 45°12′30″N 20°18′55″E
- Length: 244 km (152 mi)
- Basin size: 4,458 km^{2} (1,721 sq mi) 6,249.6 km^{2} (2,413.0 mi^{2})
- Discharge
  - location: Titel, Serbia (near mouth)
  - average: 22 m^{3}/s (780 cu ft/s) 18.869 m^{3}/s (666.4 cu ft/s)

Basin features
- Progression: Tisza→ Danube→ Black Sea
- Tributaries
  - left: Bega Luncanilor; Gladna; Bega Veche
  - right: Bega Poienilor; Chizdia

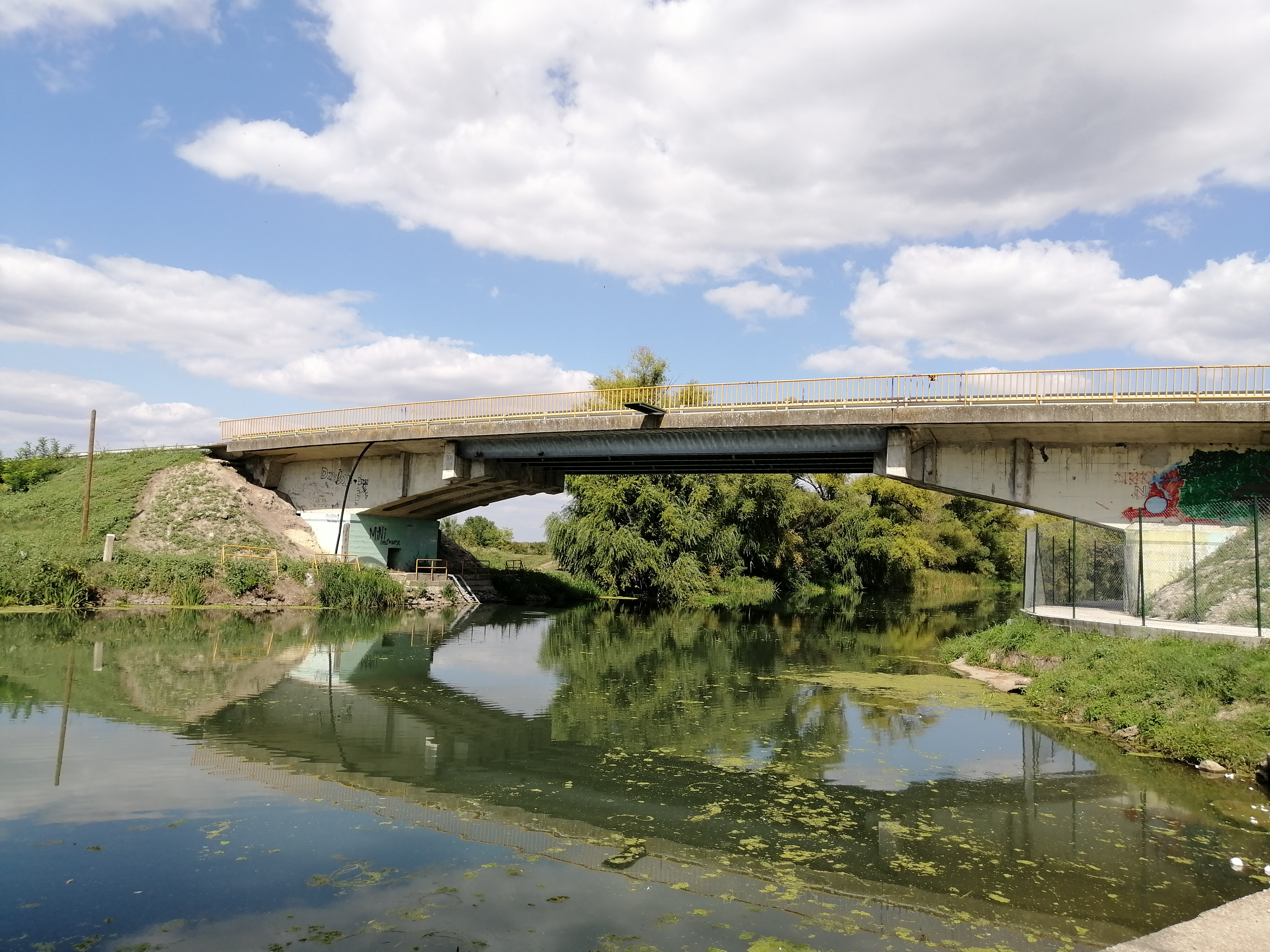
Bridge over Bega (Begej) river near Žitište

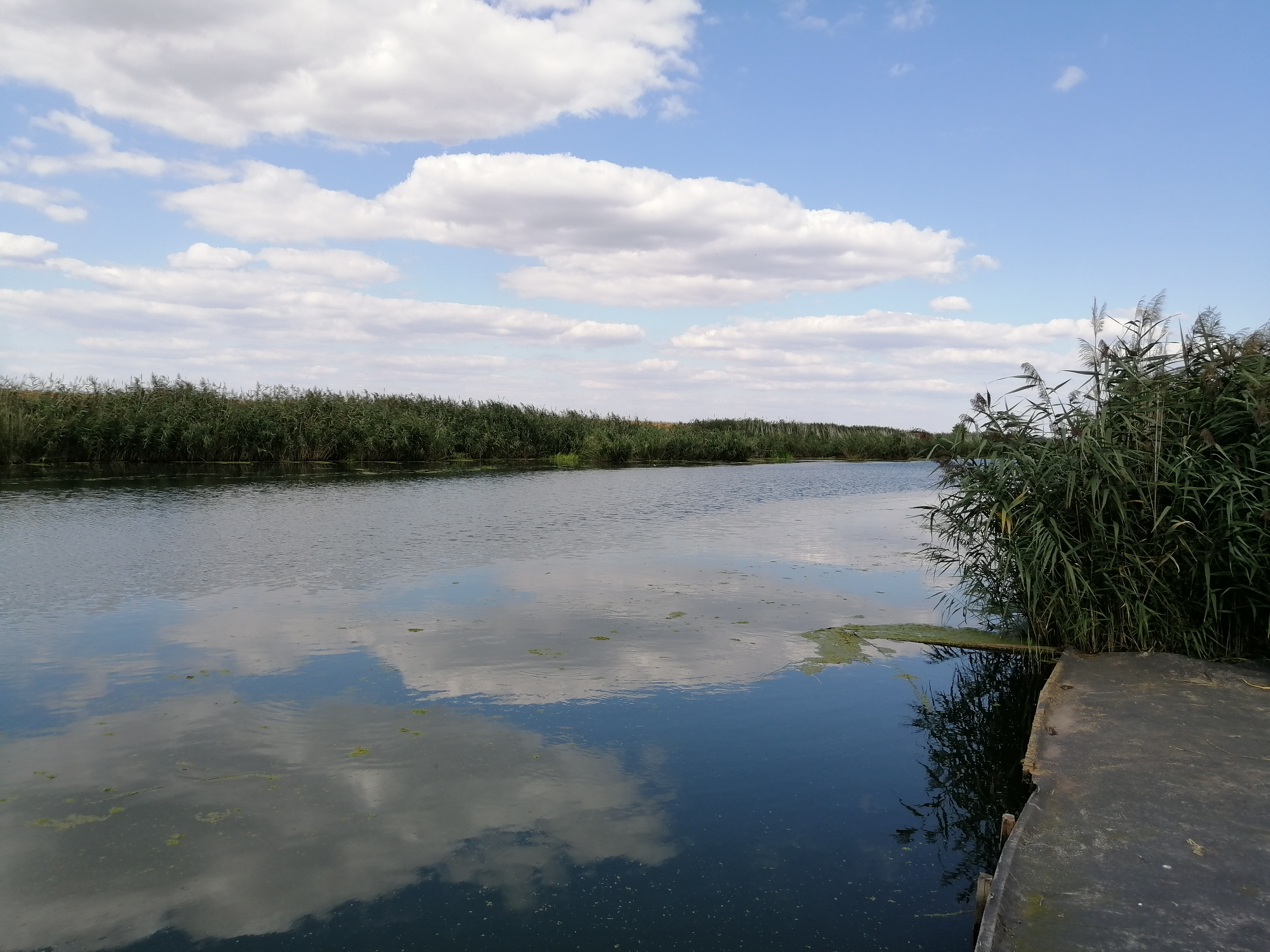
Bega (Begej) between Klek, Zrenjanin and Žitište in Serbia

The Bega or Begej (Romanian: Bega; Serbian: Бегеј / Begej; German: Bega; Hungarian: Béga, formerly Kistemes), is a 244 km (152 mile) long river in Romania (169 km; 105 mi.) and Serbia (75 km; 47 mi.). It rises in the Poiana Ruscă Mountains in Romania, part of the Carpathian Mountains, and it flows into the Tisa river near Titel, Vojvodina, Serbia. Its drainage basin covers an area of 4,458 km^{2} (1,721 sq mi), of which 2,362 km^{2} (912 sq mi) is in Romania.

== Course ==
=== Romania ===
The river starts at the confluence of its headwaters, Bega Luncanilor and Bega Poienilor. After flowing north, the river bends to the west at Curtea, passing through Făget, Balinț, and Topolovățu Mare, where it enters the low Banat plains. There, it begins to spill over, so the Bega Canal was constructed tracking Bega Veche, which is also channelled for 97 km (60 mi), as a parallel waterway for 114 km (71 mi), before the two rejoin northeast of Zrenjanin, Serbia. The Bega Canal runs through Timișoara and continues to the southwest, enters Serbia near the village of Srpski Itebej.

=== Serbia ===
Near Klek and Novi Itebej, the Begej becomes part of the large Danube–Tisa–Danube Canal (DTD) and turns south, receiving waters from the Stari Begej. There it is separated from DTD route turning west and reaching Zrenjanin. From there it continues to the south, using the old river bed of the Tisa, passing through Ečka, Stajićevo, and Perlez. In this part, it flows through marshlands, some of which are transformed into the Ečka fish pond, the largest one in Serbia with an area of 25 km^{2} (9.7 sq mi). The remaining parts of wetland make the largest swamp in Serbia, Carska Bara (11 km^{2}; 4¼ sq. mi.), after which Begej empties into the Tisa.

== Characteristics ==
Through the Tisa and Danube rivers, it belongs to the Black Sea catchment basin. Its own catchment area is 2,878 km^{2} (1,111 sq mi).

In the 17th century, the river was used for the transportation of wood and for the draining of the surrounding marshy lands. After the 1718 Treaty of Passarowitz when the Habsburg monarchy acquired the Banat area, new Austrian authorities began concurrent construction of two parallel channeled flows. One included the channeling of the Bega Veche or Stari Begej. Originally 120 km (75 mi) long, today it is a bit shorter and is actually a tributary to the Bega. It is mostly used for draining.

The second channel is the modern Bega flow, previously known as the Navigable Begej. It included the 70 km (43 mi) long section between Timișoara (now in Romania) and Klek (now in Serbia). The river was previously used for dumping of the wastewater. Four complexes of locks-sluices were built from 1910 to 1912 which allowed for constant navigation, regardless of the periods of low water levels. Today two are in Romania (Sânmihaiu Român, Sânmartinu Maghiar) and two are in Serbia (Itebej, Klek). It was navigable for ships up to 500 tons. Also, floods were regulated, too. Due to the lack of proper maintenance, the Serbian section of the channel stopped being navigable in 1958. Due to the deteriorating state of the locks, even the recreational sailing was banned so the water was used only for irrigation and for supplying the fishponds.

In August 2018 the project of a massive revitalization of the river was announced as a joint venture of Serbia, Romania, and the European Union. The project will include the transformation of the river into a navigable one again, all the way to the Romanian border. It also includes dredging of the river, reconstruction of the locks at Srpski Itebej and Klek (and additional two in Romania), revitalization of a port and an anchorage in Zrenjanin and a bicycle path along the river, from Zrenjanin to the Romanian border. It is planned that the entire project will be finished in 4 years, by 2022.

Works on the marina and an anchorage in Zrenjanin began in the summer of 2019, concurrently with the construction of the bicycle path to the Romanian border. As the works began in 2019, the deadline was moved to 2023, but the anchorage should be finished by 2022. Additional works includes the cleaning and revitalization of the river itself. By 2019, Romanian part of the river was completely cleaned, as the problems with the pollution were solved, partially due to the shut down of the dirt industries and partially because of the implemented treatment of the waste. On Serbian side, nothing has been on the pollution prevention and the major sources of pollution are the town of Zrenjanin itself and the Ečka fishponds, which also polluted the nearby Carska Bara nature reserve.

Settlements on Begej include the villages of Srpski Itebej (with a huge fishpond), Novi Itebej, Torak (formerly Begejci) and Žitište.

== Tributaries ==
The following rivers are tributaries to the river Bega (in downstream order):

- Left: Bega Luncanilor, Carpen, Șopot, Vădana, Zopana, Gladna, Glavița
- Right: Bega Poienilor, Năndreasca, Icui, Coștei, Bunea, Cladova, Nieregiș, Fădimac, Miniș, Chizdia, Iosifalău, Mociur, Valea Țiganului, Gherteamoș, Remetea, Behela, Bega Veche

Part of the water from the river Timiș is diverted towards the Bega by the Coșteiu–Chizătău Canal.

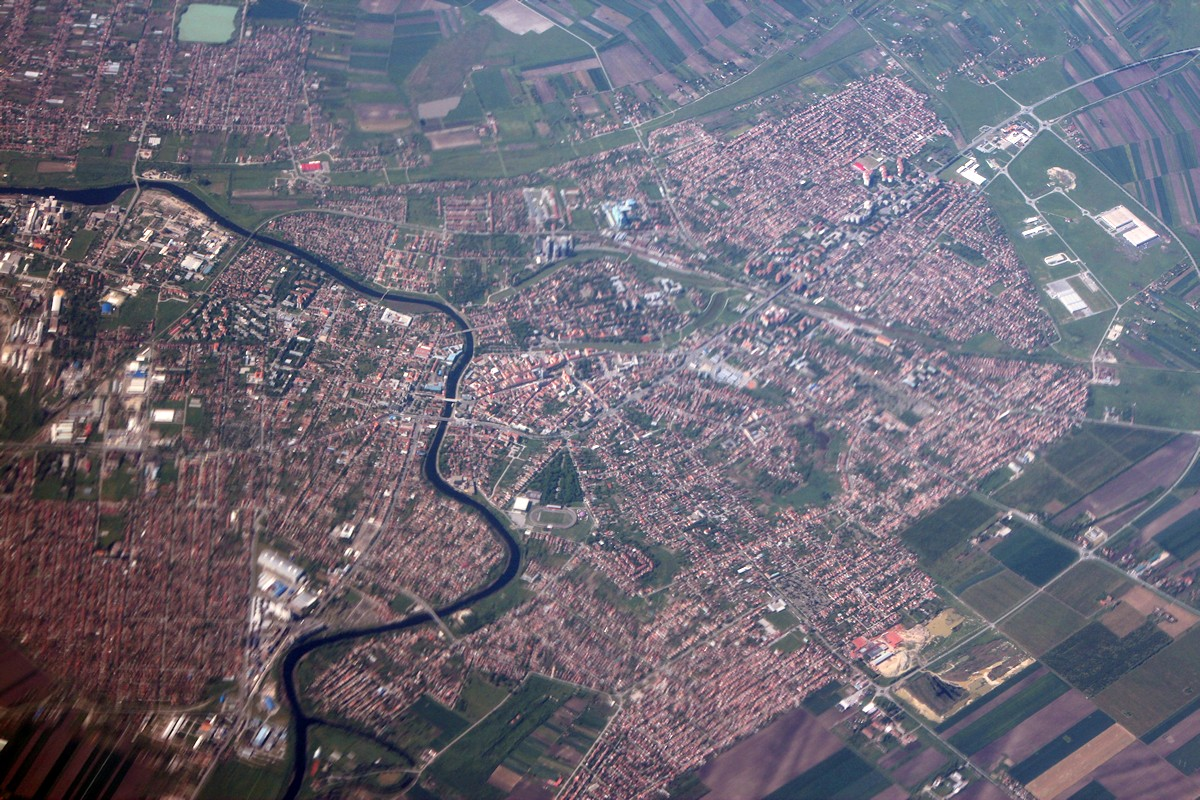
Bega in Zrenjanin

== Settlements ==
=== Romania ===
In downstream order: Margina, Făget, Răchita, Mănăștiur, Leucușești, Bethausen, Cutina, Bodo, Balinț, Chizătău, Ictar-Budinț, Topolovățu Mic, Recaș, Remetea Mare, Ghiroda, Timișoara, Utvin, Sânmihaiu Român, Uivar, Otelec

=== Serbia ===
In downstream order: Srpski Itebej, Novi Itebej, Torak, Žitište, Klek, Zrenjanin, Ečka, Lukino Selo, Stajićevo, Perlez, Titel

== See also ==
- Ečka fish pond

== Sources ==
- Mala Prosvetina Enciklopedija, Third edition (1985); Prosveta; ISBN 86-07-00001-2
- Jovan Đ. Marković (1990): Enciklopedijski geografski leksikon Jugoslavije; Svjetlost-Sarajevo; ISBN 86-01-02651-6

== Images ==
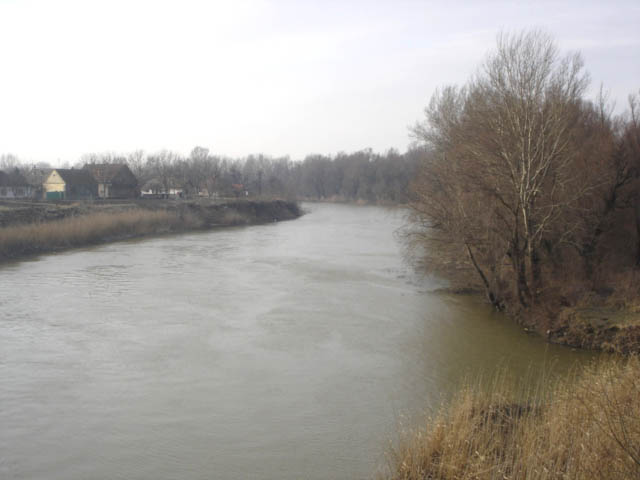
The Bega near Ečka

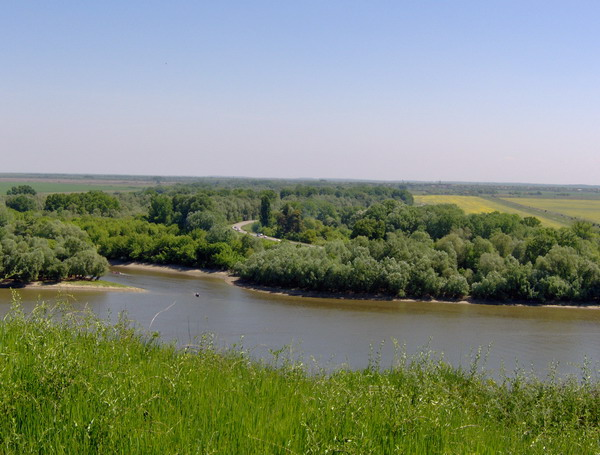
The mouth of the Bega into the Tisa, across Titel
