= Bara, Timiș =

Bara
- Commune
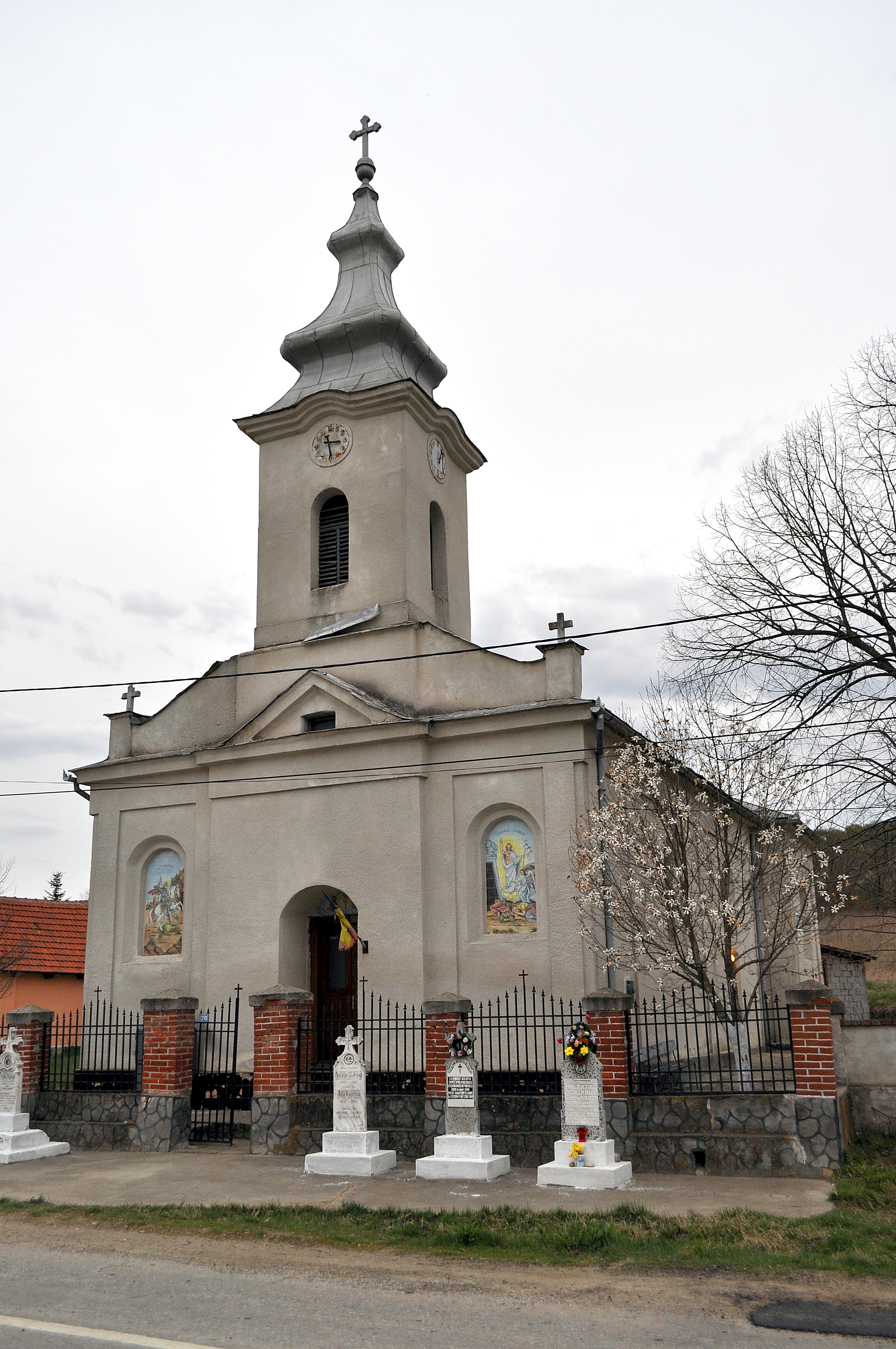
- St. George Orthodox church in Bara

- Location in Timiș County

- Location in Romania
- Coordinates: 45.8931°N 21.8806°E
- Country: Romania
- County: Timiș

Government
  - Mayor (2020–): Daniel-Casian Ursu (PSD)
- Area: 70.4 km^{2} (27.2 sq mi)
- Population (2021-12-01): 299
  - Density: 4.25/km^{2} (11.0/sq mi)
- Time zone: UTC+02:00 (EET)
  - Summer (DST): UTC+03:00 (EEST)
- Postal code: 307020–307024
- Vehicle reg.: TM
- Website: www.comunabara.ro

Bara (Hungarian: Barafalva; German: Barr; Serbian: Бара, romanized: Bara) is a commune in Timiș County, Romania. It is composed of five villages: Bara (commune seat), Dobrești, Lăpușnic, Rădmănești and Spata. Bara is located in the northeast of Timiș County, in a hilly area, 70 km (43 mi) from Timișoara and 30 km (19 mi) from Lugoj. It is the least populated of the communes of Timiș County and the 6th commune with the smallest population in Romania.

== History ==
The first recorded mention of Bara dates from 1367. The name Bara is of Slavic origin and, in medieval documents, is associated with the description "terra acquosa", meaning a marshy land. In 1440 Bara is taken from the prefect of Timiș by King Vladislav I and given to the Șoimoș Fortress. By 1477 it was the property of the prefect of Pozsony, Miklós Bánffy. Under the Turks it was destroyed and re-established in 1690–1700. In 1879 Bara was bought by Pavel Teodorescu and Constantin Florea. The village was Romanian and remained mostly Romanian during the Austro-Hungarian rule.

All the villages in the commune were massively depopulated after World War II. Spata, for instance, became a ghost village in 1997 with the death of the last native. However, the settlement was repopulated by several families of Transylvanian shepherds.

== Demographics ==
Ethnic composition (2021)
1. Romanians (94.0%)
2. Others (6.03%)
Religious composition (2021)
1. Orthodox (92.0%)
2. Unknown (6.02%)
3. Others (2.01%)

Bara had a population of 299 inhabitants at the 2021 census, down 22.94% from the 2011 census. Most inhabitants are Romanians (93.97%). By religion, most inhabitants are Orthodox (91.97%). For 6.02% of the population, religious affiliation is unknown.

Census		Ethnic composition
Year	Population	Romanians	Hungarians	Germans
1880	2,980	2,890	15	52
1890	2,857	2,809	36	11
1900	3,378	3,283	56	36
1910	3,381	3,289	37	37
1920	3,190	3,164	8	9
1930	3,105	3,066	9	25
1941	2,927	2,904	6	15
1956	2,633	2,620	8	–
1966	1,885	1,881	1	1
1977	816	811	–	–
1992	427	417	9	–
2002	378	367	8	–
2011	388	380	–	–
2021	299	281	–	–

== Politics and administration ==
The commune of Bara is administered by a mayor and a local council composed of 9 councilors. The mayor, Daniel-Casian Ursu, from the Social Democratic Party, has been in office since 2020. As from the 2024 local elections, the local council has the following composition by political parties:

Party	Seats	Composition
Save Romania Union–People's Movement Party–Force of the Right	4	
Social Democratic Party	3	
Union of the Ukrainians of Romania	1	
S.O.S. Romania	1	

== Notable people ==
- Emilian Micu (1865–1909), theologian, librarian and bibliophile
- Daniel Ciobotea (b. 1951), Patriarch of the Romanian Orthodox Church (2007–present)
- Ioan Peia (b. 1952), poet in Banat dialect
