= Curtea =

- Commune
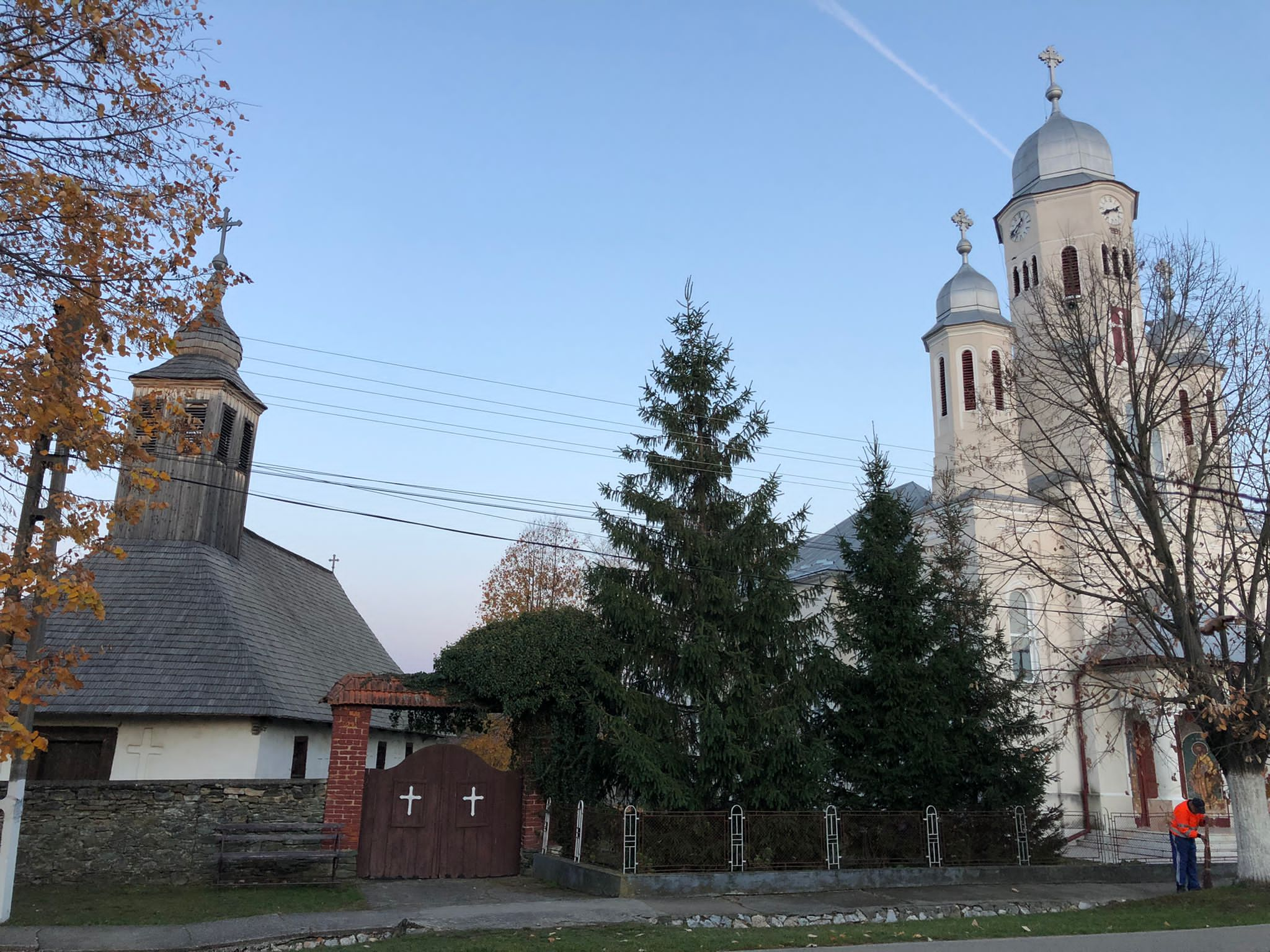
- The old and new churches in Curtea

- Location in Timiș County

- Location in Romania
- Coordinates: 45.829°N 22.308°E
- Country: Romania
- County: Timiș

Government
  - Mayor (2020–): Marinel-Ovidiu Crăciunescu (PSD)
- Area: 44.38 km^{2} (17.14 sq mi)
- Population (2021-12-01): 1,228
  - Density: 27.67/km^{2} (71.67/sq mi)
- Time zone: UTC+02:00 (EET)
  - Summer (DST): UTC+03:00 (EEST)
- Postal code: 307135–307137
- Vehicle reg.: TM
- Website: www.primariacurtea.ro

Curtea (Hungarian: Kurtya; German: Kurtaa; Serbian: Куртје, romanized: Kurtje) is a commune in Timiș County, Romania. It is composed of three villages: Coșava, Curtea (commune seat) and Homojdia.

== Geography ==
Curtea is located in the northeast of Timiș County, close to the border of Hunedoara County, 110 km (68 mi) from Timișoara, 45 km (28 mi) from Lugoj and 12 km (7.5 mi) from Făget, the nearest town. Curtea lies at the foothills of Poiana Ruscă Mountains, at the confluence of Valea Izvorașului with Valea Stâlpului, which, in fact, form the upper course of Bega River.

== History ==
The first recorded mention of Curtea dates from 1597 (Kurthe), when it belonged to Marzsina District, Hunyad County. Legend has it that Curtea was once the summer residence of Romanian duke Glad, and Curtea took this name because Glad kept his entire court here (in Romanian curte means "court"). A Turkish possession by 1658, Curtea was a place of refuge for Transylvanian nemes (small and medium nobles) in conflict with the Hungarian royal house. In Marsigli's notes from 1690–1700 it was called Kortya and belonged to Facset District, and in the 1717 census it appears as inhabited, with 50 houses. The first Romanian school was established here in 1776. The wooden church, which can still be seen today, dates from 1794.

== Demographics ==
Ethnic composition (2021)
1. Romanians (91.4%)
2. Roma (2.28%)
3. Unknown (5.86%)
4. Others (0.42%)
Religious composition (2021)
1. Orthodox (73.8%)
2. Pentecostals (16.5%)
3. Baptists (1.54%)
4. Unknown (6.51%)
5. Others (1.65%)

Curtea had a population of 1,228 inhabitants at the 2021 census, up 2.93% from the 2011 census. Most inhabitants are Romanians (91.44%), with a minority of Roma (2.28%). For 5.86% of the population, ethnicity is unknown. By religion, most inhabitants are Orthodox (73.77%), but there are also minorities of Pentecostals (16.53%) and Baptists (1.54%). For 6.51% of the population, religious affiliation is unknown.

Census		Ethnic composition
Year	Population	Romanians	Hungarians	Germans	Roma
1880	2,109	2,048	23	36	–
1890	2,158	2,088	41	15	–
1900	2,266	2,117	41	33	–
1910	2,399	2,290	65	17	–
1920	2,275	2,232	37	1	–
1930	2,215	2,106	20	9	73
1941	2,071	1,996	12	16	–
1956	1,927	1,911	5	6	–
1966	1,731	1,684	8	1	29
1977	1,656	1,593	4	–	57
1992	1,459	1,429	3	2	23
2002	1,323	1,275	7	2	36
2011	1,193	1,122	9	–	25
2021	1,228	1,123	–	–	28

== Politics and administration ==
The commune of Curtea is administered by a mayor and a local council composed of 9 councilors. The mayor, Marinel-Ovidiu Crăciunescu, from the Social Democratic Party, has been in office since 2020. As from the 2024 local elections, the local council has the following composition by political parties:

Party	Seats	Composition
Social Democratic Party	6	
Save Romania Union–People's Movement Party–Force of the Right	2	
Alliance for the Union of Romanians	1	
