= Poiana Ruscă Mountains =

Mountain range in Romania

Coordinates: 45°40′N 22°20′E

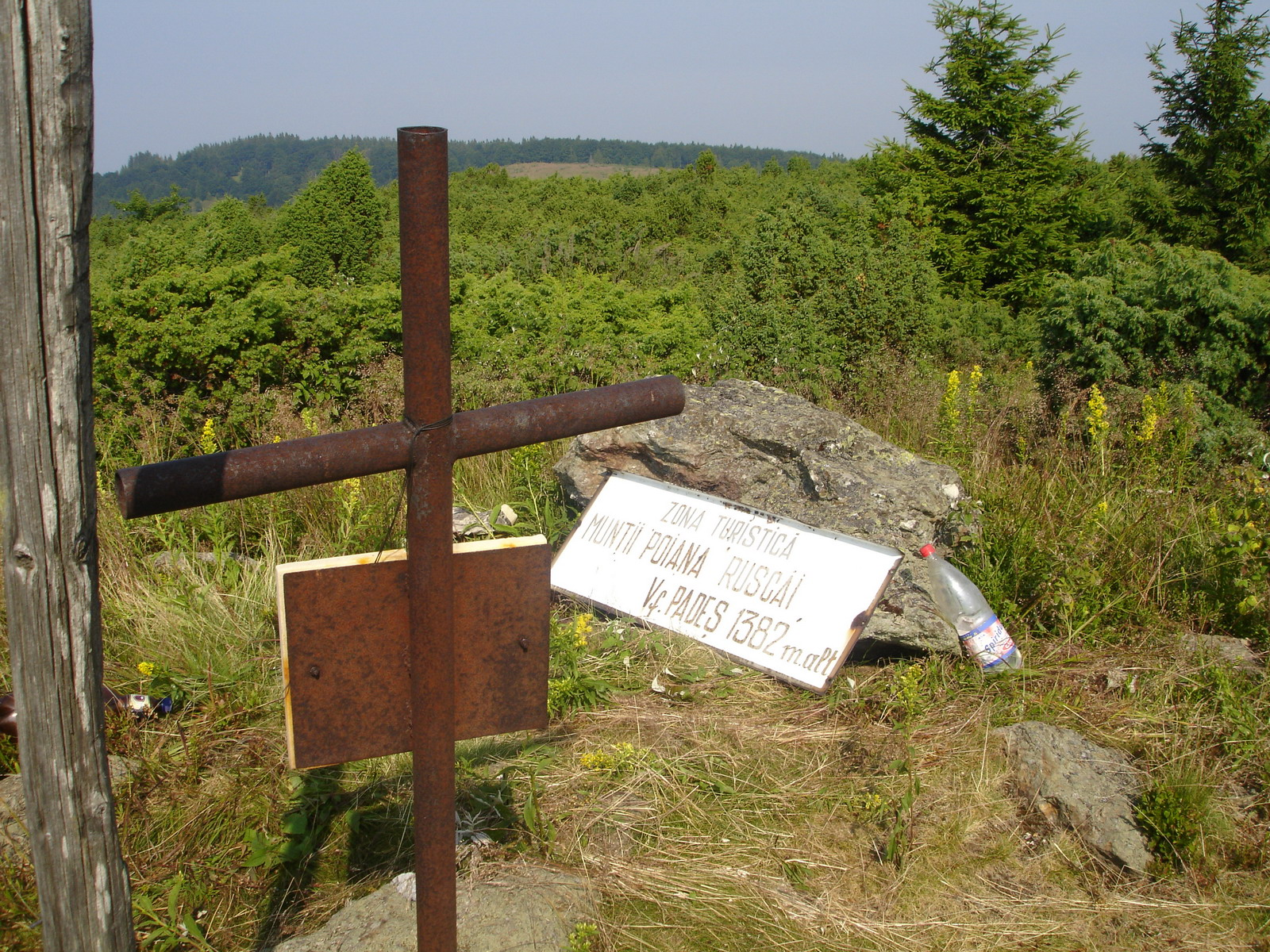
On top of Padeș Peak

The Poiana Ruscă Mountains (part of the Western Carpathians) are a Carpathian mountain range in western Romania. The mountains are situated roughly south of the Mureș River, northeast of the Timiș River, and west of the Strei River. The Bega River emerges from these mountains. The nearest large towns are Lugoj, Hunedoara, and Caransebeș.

The Poiana Ruscă Mountains cover an area of about 2,640 square kilometres (1,020 sq mi), having mean altitudes from 700 to 1,000 metres (2,300 to 3,300 ft). The highest summit is the Padeș Peak, at 1,382 metres (4,534 ft).

== Mining ==
The mountains contain resources such as magnetite, iron, thorium and lead, and as such are the site of many mines. In the nineteenth century, the mountains were also centers of gold, silver, and salt mining and production. However, after 1990 some mines were closed and others abandoned, leaving waste ore and radioactive mines still unprotected in the mountain range.

== Divisions of the mountains ==
- Poiana Ruscă (literally: Ruscă Meadows)
- Lipova Plateau (Podișul Lipovei)
- Bega-Timiș Groove (Culoarul Bega-Timiș)
- Orăștie Groove (Culoarul Orăștiei), including the Hațeg Depression (Depresiunea Hațegului)
