= Bârna =

Bârna Брна
- Commune
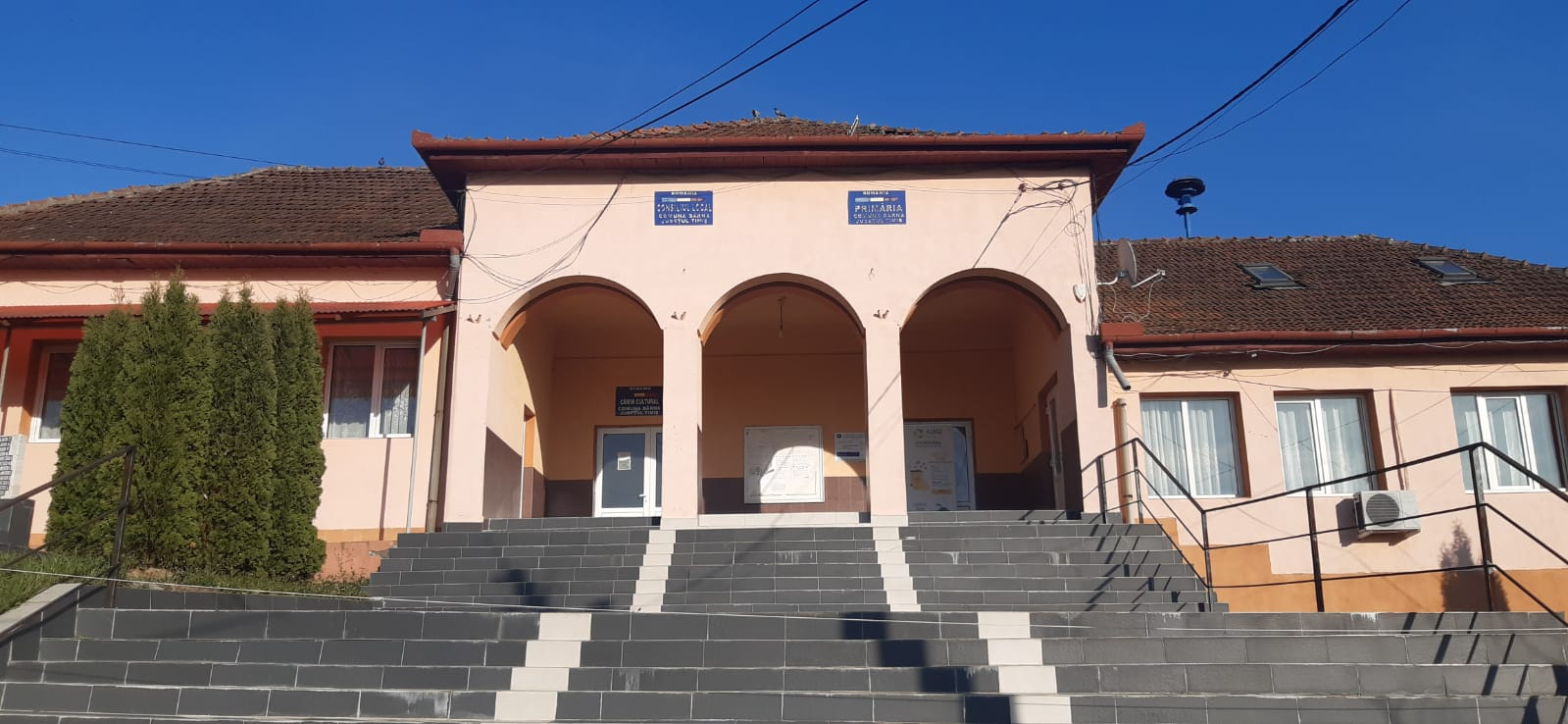
- The mayor's office

- Location in Timiș County

- Location in Romania
- Coordinates: 45.72°N 22.055°E
- Country: Romania
- County: Timiș

Government
  - Mayor (2024–): Ovidiu-Nicolae Ignatoni (PNL)
- Area: 78.62 km^{2} (30.36 sq mi)
- Population (2021-12-01): 1,473
  - Density: 18.74/km^{2} (48.53/sq mi)
- Time zone: UTC+02:00 (EET)
  - Summer (DST): UTC+03:00 (EEST)
- Postal code: 307025–307032
- Vehicle reg.: TM
- Website: www.primariabirna.ro

Bârna (Hungarian: Barnafalva; German: Birnau; Serbian: Брна, romanized: Brna; Ukrainian: Брна) is a commune in Timiș County, Romania. It is composed of seven villages: Bârna (commune seat), Botești, Botinești, Drinova, Jurești, Pogănești and Sărăzani.

== Geography ==
Located in the Săraz Valley, surrounded by forests, with villages located some on hills, others along the water, Bârna is one of the communes in the east of Timiș County and borders Fârdea to the east, Lugoj to the west, Traian Vuia to the north and Criciova and Nădrag to the south.

Bârna is crossed by several streams, the most important being Săraz, Verdea, Finodia and Scăioasa.

== History ==
=== Bârna ===
The first recorded mention of Bârna dates from 1514, when it belonged to the family of George of Brandenburg-Ansbach, heir of the Hunyadis. Most likely, Bârna was also owned by the Hunyadi family, as well as the other villages in the district of Bujor, as it was called then. The village was part of Timiș County, sometimes of Hunedoara County, and from the Middle Ages it was permanently inhabited. In 1771 Bârna is mentioned as belonging to the district of Făget, with 90 houses. The population was predominantly Romanian. In the hearth of the village there was also the settlement of Peperig, also mentioned in 1514.

During 1970–1980, in Bârna and in the neighboring villages (Pogănești, Știuca, etc.), Ukrainians who came to work in forest exploitation and wood processing began to settle here.

=== Botești ===
Botești (Hungarian: Borzasfalva; German: Bottest) was first mentioned in 1414 as Begyesth, a name reconfirmed in 1464. Over time it belonged sometimes to Timiș County, sometimes to Hunedoara County. After the conquest of Banat by the Austrians, in the 1717 census, it appears as inhabited, having 20 houses and bearing the name Boteschel. Later it will become the property of the tax authorities. In the interwar period, it had 35 houses, all located along a single street. After World War II, the locality began to gradually lose its inhabitants, becoming one of the smallest in Timiş County.

=== Botinești ===
Like Bârna, Botinești (Hungarian: Bottyánfalva; German: Bottinest) is first mentioned in 1514. It seems that it was part of the Hunyadi properties, because in 1514 it was owned by George Brandenburg. In medieval documents, there are different names associated with the locality: Andrei Stancu of Botinești in 1599 and also then the Romanians George Tripa and Ștefan Tripa.

After the conquest of Banat by the Austrians, in 1717 the first census took place, in which Botineşti was found to have 15 houses, so it had well passed the period of Ottoman occupation and was still inhabited. After the re-establishment of Krassó County in 1779, the locality passed to this county, Kápolnás District. Before 1848, it was in the possession of the knight Nicolae Malenița, whose descendants owned the village until 1880, when it became the property of George Klein. During all this time, the locality was purely Romanian.

=== Drinova ===
As in the case of Botinești, Drinova (Hungarian: Derenyő; German: Drinau) was owned by George Brandenburg in 1514. In 1596, Sigismund Báthory donated Drinova, together with other properties, to István Jósika. By 1601, a certain Ioan Vlad of Lugoj was put in possession of Drinova. At the 1717 census, it had 20 houses and belonged to the Karánsebes District.

=== Jurești ===
The first recorded mention of Jurești (Hungarian: Györösd; German: Schürest) dates from 1569, when it belonged to Hunedoara County. In the Austrian census of 1717, the locality had 18 houses and was part of the Facsád District. The Austrian authorities at that time called it Schuresche, and later it was called Zsurest and Györösd, to imitate the Romanian Giurești. The Orthodox church was built in 1889. In the interwar period, it was part of the Lugoj District, Severin County.

Over time it was inhabited by Romanians, not being touched by the colonization that took place in other areas of the Banat. In the 1980s, Ukrainians settled here, who today form a community of over 30 people (15%).

=== Pogănești ===
The first recorded mention of Pogănești (Hungarian: Pogányfalva; German: Poganest; Ukrainian: Поганешт) dates from 1453, from a Hungarian diploma by which King Ladislaus V donated several localities to John Hunyadi, including Poganfalva – as the village was called in Hungarian. Located in a safer area, it continued to be inhabited during the Turkish period, as attested by Marsigli's writings from 1690–1700 and the Austrian census of 1717. The church was built in 1889. In the interwar period, it was part of Lugoj District, Severin County.

Until the 1970s it was a purely Romanian locality, not being affected by the large colonizations of Banat. In the 1970s, Ukrainians from the north of Bukovina and Maramureș began to settle here to work in wood. Against the background of the decrease of the Romanian population, the Ukrainians soon became the majority, and today they form the absolute majority of the inhabitants.

=== Sărăzani ===
Sărăzani (Hungarian: Szárazány; German: Sarassing) first appears in written records in 1514, but the locality is older and most likely was in the possession of John Hunyadi. The name of the locality comes from sarazini, which in the old Romanian language denoted the people who built and defended the wooden gates of the medieval fortresses. In the Austrian census of 1717 it had 20 houses. The Orthodox church was built in 1878. In the interwar period, it was part of Lugoj District, Severin County.

It has always been inhabited by Romanians. In the 1990s, Ukrainians began to settle here, and today they currently form a significant community.

== Demographics ==
Ethnic composition (2021)
1. Romanians (69.3%)
2. Ukrainians (24.8%)
3. Unknown (5.36%)
4. Others (0.49%)
Religious composition (2021)
1. Orthodox (78.4%)
2. Adventists (8.41%)
3. Pentecostals (4.41%)
4. Baptists (1.15%)
5. Unknown (6.31%)
6. Others (1.31%)

Bârna had a population of 1,473 inhabitants at the 2021 census, down 10.18% from the 2011 census. Most inhabitants are Romanians (69.31%), with a minority of Ukrainians (24.84%). For 5.36% of the population, ethnicity is unknown. By religion, most inhabitants are Orthodox (78.41%), but there are also minorities of Adventists (8.41%), Pentecostals (4.41%) and Baptists (1.15%). For 6.31% of the population, religious affiliation is unknown.

Census		Ethnic composition
Year	Population	Romanians	Ukrainians
1880	2,310	2,271	–
1890	2,476	2,453	–
1900	2,862	2,763	–
1910	2,959	2,899	–
1920	2,644	2,621	–
1930	2,608	2,568	1
1941	2,521	2,485	–
1956	2,188	2,172	–
1966	1,882	1,871	–
1977	1,803	1,601	196
1992	1,691	1,186	504
2002	1,573	1,036	534
2011	1,640	1,138	448
2021	1,473	1,021	366

== Politics and administration ==
The commune of Bârna is administered by a mayor and a local council composed of 8 councilors. The mayor, Ovidiu-Nicolae Ignatoni, from the National Liberal Party, has been in office since 2024. As from the 2024 local elections, the local council has the following composition by political parties:

Party	Seats	Composition
National Liberal Party	4	
Social Democratic Party	3	
Alliance for the Union of Romanians	1	

== Notable people ==
- Ioan Fărcaș (b. 1929), poet, epigrammatist and prose writer
