= Gladna =

Gladna Râul
- Location within Romania

Location
- Country: Romania
- Counties: Timiș County
- Villages: Gladna Română, Gladna Montană, Fârdea, Surducu Mic, Traian Vuia

Physical characteristics
- Mouth: Bega
  - location: Leucușești
  - coordinates: 45°49′53″N 22°0′38″E
- Length: 34 km (21 mi)
- Basin size: 173 km^{2} (67 sq mi)

Basin features
- Progression: Bega→ Tisza→ Danube→ Black Sea
- Tributaries
  - left: Rozalia, Valea Moașei, Hăuzeasca
  - right: Zoldiana, Munișel, Timișel

The Gladna or Râul is a left tributary of the river Bega in Romania. It discharges into the Bega in Leucușești. Its length is 34 km (21 mi) and its basin size is 173 km^{2} (67 sq mi). The Surduc Dam in the northwestern part of Poiana Ruscă Mountains is built on the Gladna.
