= Pogăniș River =

Pogăniș River may refer to:

- Pogăniș, a river in western Romania, tributary of the Timiș
- Pogăniș River (Bega), a small river in western Romania, tributary of the Săraz (Bega basin)
