= Glavița =

- Location within Romania

Location
- Country: Romania
- Counties: Timiș County
- Villages: Jupani, Susani, Cliciova, Nevrincea, Păru

Physical characteristics
- Mouth: Coșteiu-Chizătău Canal
  - coordinates: 45.7692°N 21.7898°E
- Length: 31 km (19 mi)
- Basin size: 275 km^{2} (106 sq mi)

Basin features
- Progression: Bega→ Tisza→ Danube→ Black Sea
- Tributaries
  - left: Biniș
  - right: Săraz

The Glavița is a left tributary of the river Bega in Romania. It discharges into the Bega near Chizătău. Its lower course is part of the Coșteiu-Chizătău Canal between the Timiș and the Bega. Its length is 31 km (19 mi) and its basin size is 275 km^{2} (106 sq mi).
