= Hăuzeasca =

- Location within Romania

Location
- Country: Romania
- Counties: Timiș County
- Villages: Hăuzești, Fârdea

Physical characteristics
- Mouth: Gladna
  - location: Fârdea
  - coordinates: 45.7449°N 22.1673°E
- Length: 9 km (5.6 mi)
- Basin size: 30 km^{2} (12 sq mi)

Basin features
- Progression: Gladna→ Bega→ Tisza→ Danube→ Black Sea

The Hăuzeasca is a left tributary of the river Gladna in Romania. It flows into the Gladna in Fârdea. Its length is 9 km (5.6 mi) and its basin size is 30 km^{2} (12 sq mi).
