= Valea Carierei River =

Valea Carierei River may refer to:

- Valea Carierei, a tributary of the Nădrag in Timiș County, Romania
- Valea Carierei, a tributary of the Timiș in Brașov County, Romania
