= Mâtnicu =

Mâtnicu may refer to several places in Romania:

- Mâtnicu Mare, a village in Constantin Daicoviciu Commune, Caraş-Severin County
- Mâtnicu Mic, a village in Fârdea Commune, Timiș County
