= Timișel =

- Location within Romania

Location
- Country: Romania
- Counties: Timiș County
- Villages: Mănăștiur

Physical characteristics
- Mouth: Gladna
  - coordinates: 45.8239°N 22.0177°E
- Length: 11 km (6.8 mi)
- Basin size: 22 km^{2} (8.5 sq mi)

Basin features
- Progression: Gladna→ Bega→ Tisza→ Danube→ Black Sea

The Timișel is a right tributary of the river Gladna in Romania. It flows into the Gladna near Jupani. In Mănăștiur part of its flow is redirected towards the Bega. Its length is 11 km (6.8 mi) and its basin size is 22 km^{2} (8.5 sq mi).
