= Săraz =

- Location within Romania

Location
- Country: Romania
- Counties: Timiș County
- Villages: Drinova, Jurești, Bârna, Sărăzani, Săceni

Physical characteristics
- Mouth: Glavița
  - coordinates: 45.8655°N 21.8154°E
- Length: 26 km (16 mi)
- Basin size: 85 km^{2} (33 sq mi)

Basin features
- Progression: Glavița→ Bega→ Tisza→ Danube→ Black Sea
- Tributaries
  - left: Pogănești
  - right: Verdea

The Săraz is a right tributary of the river Glavița in Romania. It flows into the Glavița near Jupani. Part of its flow is redirected towards the Gladna. Its length is 26 km (16 mi) and its basin size is 85 km^{2} (33 sq mi).
