= Lake Surduc =

- Lacul Surduc (Romanian)
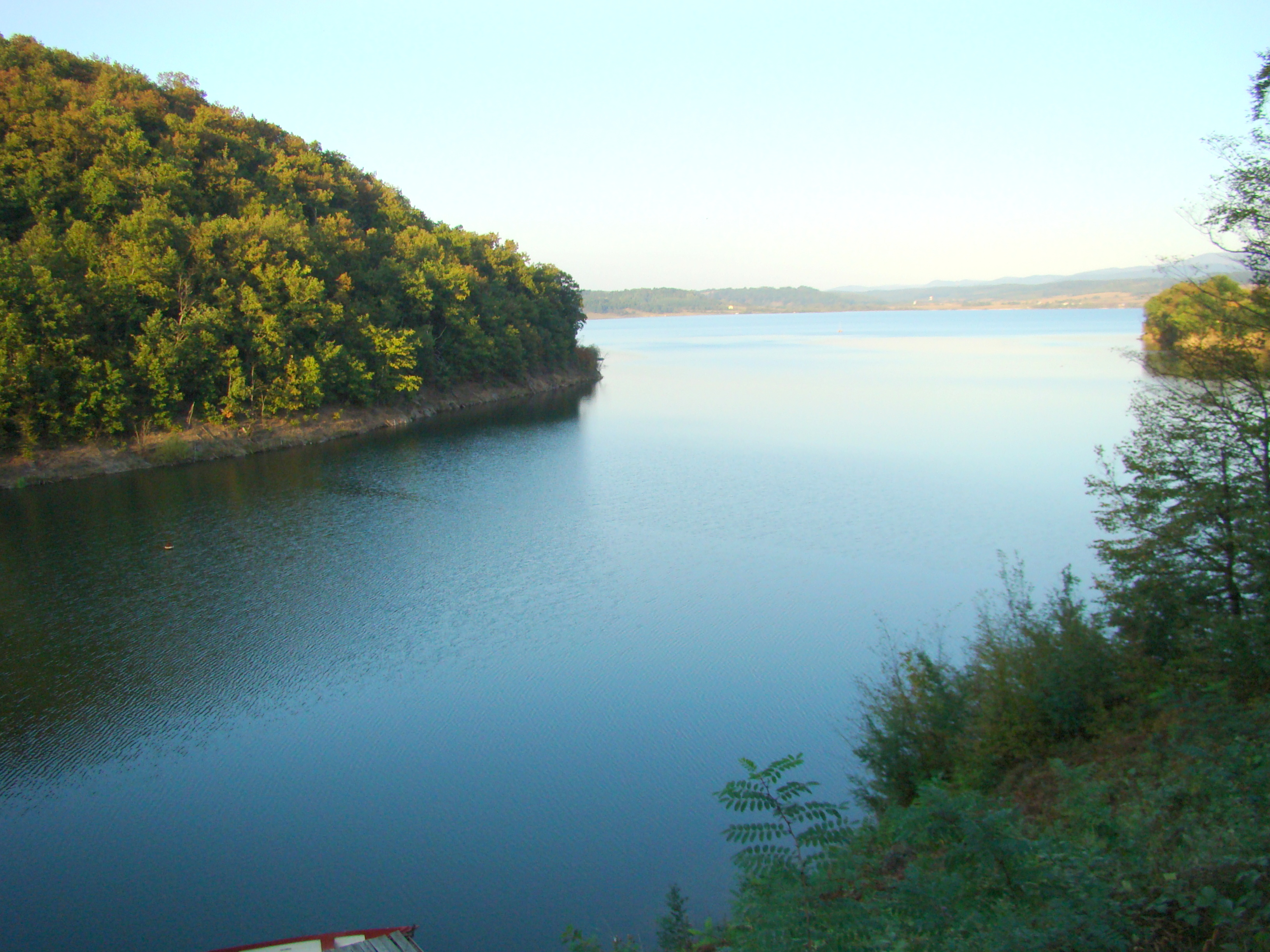

- Location within Romania
- Location: Fârdea, Timiș, Romania
- Coordinates: 45°45′28″N 22°8′45″E
- Type: Reservoir
- Etymology: Surducu Mic
- River sources: Gladna
- Managing agency: Banat Water Basin Administration
- Built: 1972
- First flooded: 1976
- Max. length: 4 km (2.5 mi)
- Max. width: 3 km (1.9 mi)
- Surface area: 357 ha (880 acres)
- Max. depth: 17.2 m (680 in)
- Water volume: 24,225,000 m^{3} (855,500,000 ft^{3})
- Residence time: 0.67 years

Lake Surduc (Romanian: Lacul Surduc) is a dammed reservoir in the northwestern part of Poiana Ruscă Mountains. It is located in Timiș County, on the administrative territory of Fârdea. It got its name from the nearby village of Surducu Mic. The lake largely ensures the drinking water supply of Timișoara and the surrounding area and protects it from flooding. As the water of the lake does not freeze, thousands of waterfowl take shelter here during the winter, the lake being a recreation area for fishermen, hunters and tourists. Lake Surduc has been an IUCN Category IV protected area since 2000.

== Description ==
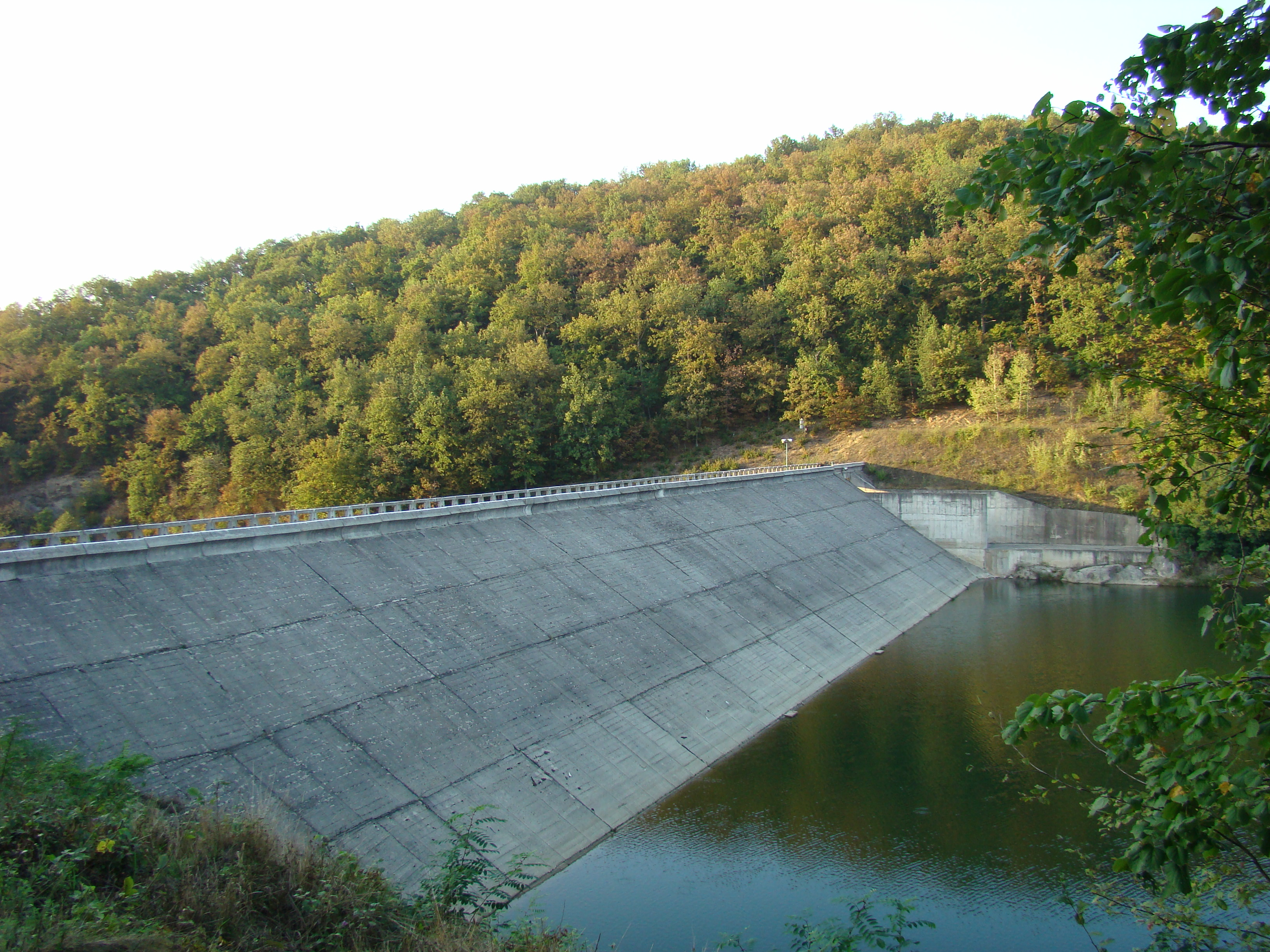
Surduc Dam

The construction of the dam began in 1972, and the accumulation of water in 1976. In 1977 it reached almost 25 million m^{3} of water. The second stage began in 1981, being designed for the accumulation of a water volume of 51.08 million m^{3}. The dam was built on the Gladna river, a left tributary of the upper Bega river, about 4 km upstream from the village of Surducu Mic. The dike is built of ripraps with a concrete mask. The ripraps and the several thousand cubic meters of concrete support 417 m^{3} of water/m^{3} of ripraps. The dam has a height of 36 m, with an opening at the crown of 130 m, the length of the lake being 4 km, the width 3 km, and the maximum depth 17.2 m. It is the narrowest dam in Romania, relative to the volume of water held. Lake Surduc supplies drinking and industrial water to Timișoara and can set in motion the turbines of a 2 MW micro-hydropower system.

== Protected area ==
Lake Surduc, in accordance with Timiș County Council Decision no. 19/1995 and Law no. 5/2000, was declared a protected natural area of national interest for the protection and conservation of ichthyofauna and avifauna. The identified natural habitats are: freshwater habitats, wetlands, grasslands and scrublands, and forest habitats. Faunal elements include: aquatic invertebrates, amphibians (Bombina bombina, Hyla arborea, Salamandra salamandra), reptiles (Emys orbicularis, Natrix tessellata), fish (carp, bream, zander, wels, pike, chub, perch, rudd, goby), aquatic avifauna, especially wintering species and populations (Gavia stellata, Ardea alba, Ciconia ciconia, Tachybaptus ruficollis, Aythya ferina, Aythya fuligula, Aythya nyroca, Anas platyrhynchos, Fulica atra), birds of prey (Buteo buteo, Falco tinnunculus, Falco peregrinus, Accipiter gentilis, Circus aeruginosus, Strix uralensis, Athene noctua), as well as passage species (Coracias garrulus).
