= Nădrag (river) =

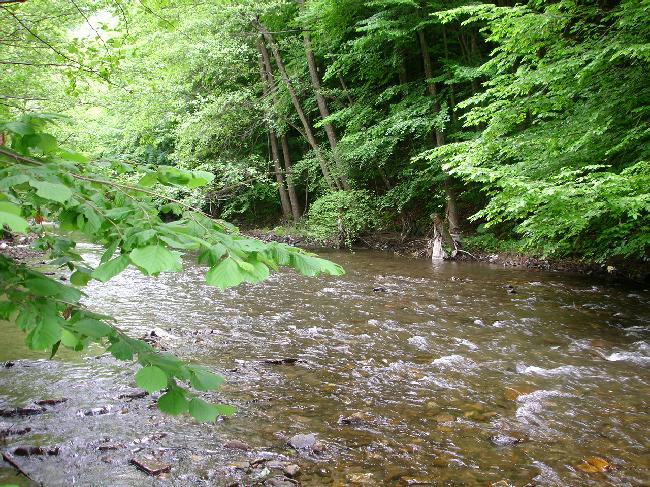

- Location within Romania

Location
- Country: Romania
- Counties: Timiș County
- Villages: Nădrag, Crivina, Jdioara

Physical characteristics
- Source: Poiana Ruscă Mountains
- Mouth: Timiș
  - location: Jdioara
  - coordinates: 45.6123°N 22.0688°E
- Length: 29 km (18 mi)
- Basin size: 135 km^{2} (52 sq mi)

Basin features
- Progression: Timiș→ Danube→ Black Sea
- Tributaries
  - left: Gosta, Gârlențiu, Cornet, Izvodia, Valea Carierei
  - right: Sălășele, Nădrăgel

The Nădrag (in its upper course also: Padeș) is a right tributary of the river Timiș in Romania. It discharges into the Timiș in Jdioara. Its source is in the Poiana Ruscă Mountains. Its length is 29 km (18 mi) and its basin size is 135 km^{2} (52 sq mi).
