= Coșteiu–Chizătău Canal =

Canal in Romania

- Interactive map of Coșteiu–Chizătău Canal

History
- Date completed: 1758

Geography
- Start point: Timiș at Coșteiu, Romania
- End point: Bega near Chizătău, Romania
- Beginning coordinates: 45.7363°N 21.8538°E
- Ending coordinates: 45.7793°N 21.7517°E

The Coșteiu–Chizătău Canal is a canal in Timiș County, western Romania. It diverts water from the river Timiș to the Bega. It is also fed by the small rivers Biniș and Glavița. It was constructed in 1757–1758.
