= Biniș =

- Location within Romania

Location
- Country: Romania
- Counties: Timiș County
- Villages: Valea Lungă Română

Physical characteristics
- Mouth: Glavița
  - location: Belinț
  - coordinates: 45.7692°N 21.7899°E
- Length: 20 km (12 mi)
- Basin size: 78 km^{2} (30 sq mi)

Basin features
- Progression: Glavița→ Bega→ Tisza→ Danube→ Black Sea
- Tributaries
  - left: Hezeriș
- River code: V.1.15.2

The Biniș is a left tributary of the Glavița in Romania. It discharges into the Glavița near Belinț. Its lower course is part of the Coșteiu-Chizătău Canal between the Timiș and the Bega. Its length is 20 km (12 mi) and its basin size is 78 km^{2} (30 sq mi).
