= Nădrag =

- Commune
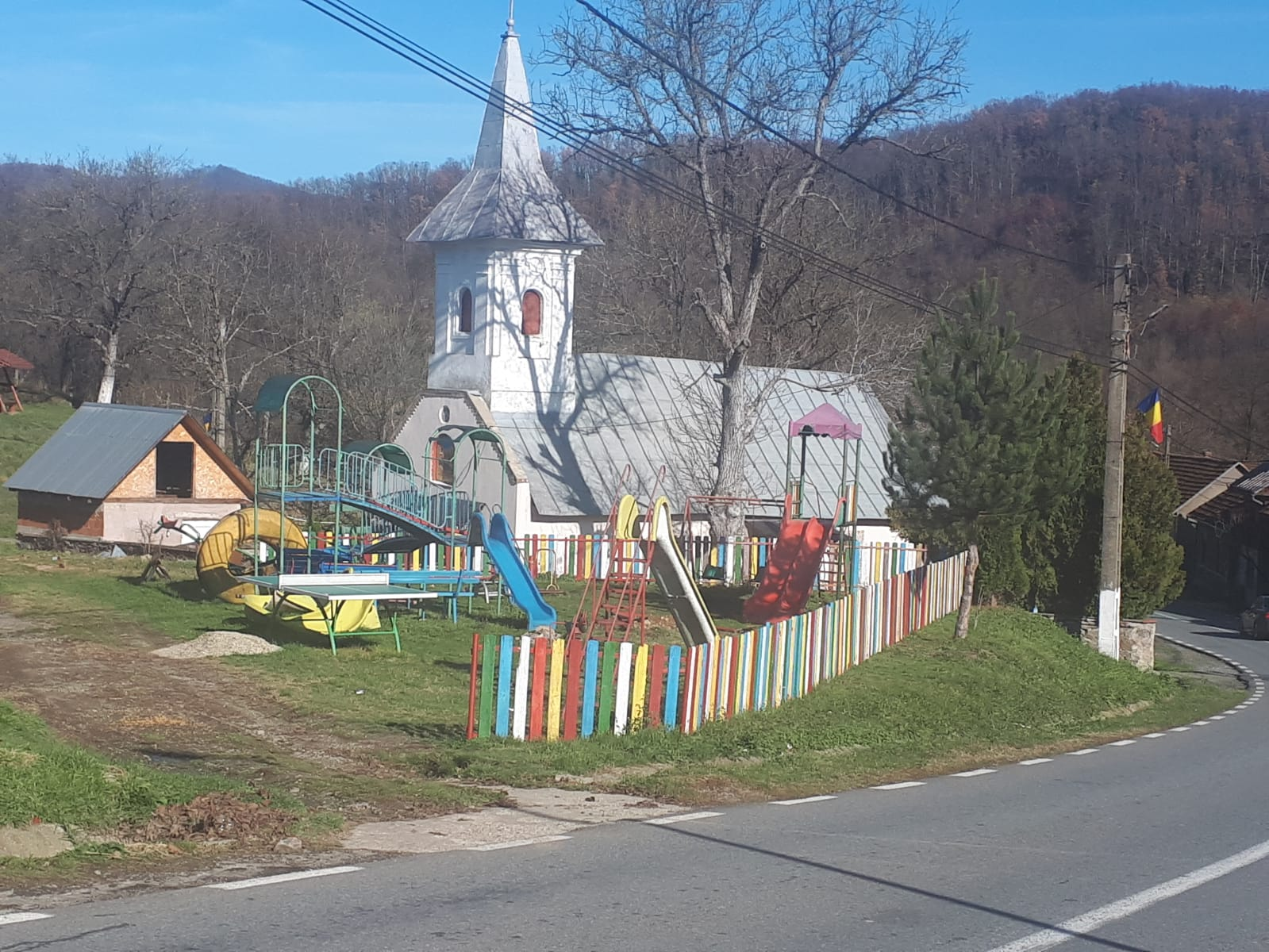
- The church in Crivina

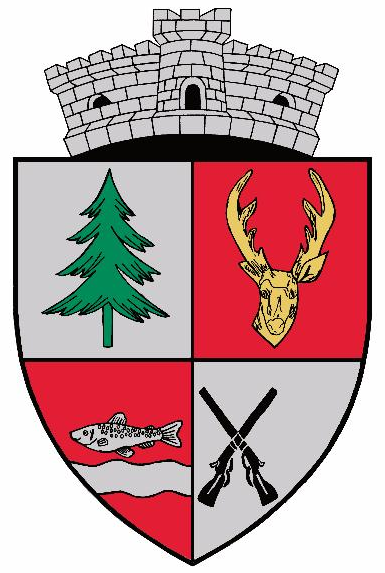
- Coat of arms

- Location in Timiș County

- Location in Romania
- Coordinates: 45°39′N 22°11′E
- Country: Romania
- County: Timiș

Government
  - Mayor (2004–): Liviu Muntean (PSD)
- Area: 132.5 km^{2} (51.2 sq mi)
- Population (2021-12-01): 2,371
  - Density: 17.89/km^{2} (46.35/sq mi)
- Time zone: UTC+02:00 (EET)
  - Summer (DST): UTC+03:00 (EEST)
- Postal code: 307290–307291
- Vehicle reg.: TM
- Website: primarianadrag.ro

Nădrag (Hungarian: Nadrág; German: Steinacker) is a commune in Timiș County, Romania. It is composed of two villages, Crivina and Nădrag.

== Geography ==
Nădrag is located in the northeastern part of Timiș County, at the foot of the 1,380-meter-high (4,530 ft) Padeș Peak in the Poiana Ruscă Mountains. Nădrag has a generally hilly relief, with mostly steeper slopes. It covers an area of 13,250 ha (32,700 acres), of which 623 ha (1,540 acres) represent agricultural land; 247 ha (610 acres), in turn, are arable.

=== Hydrography ===
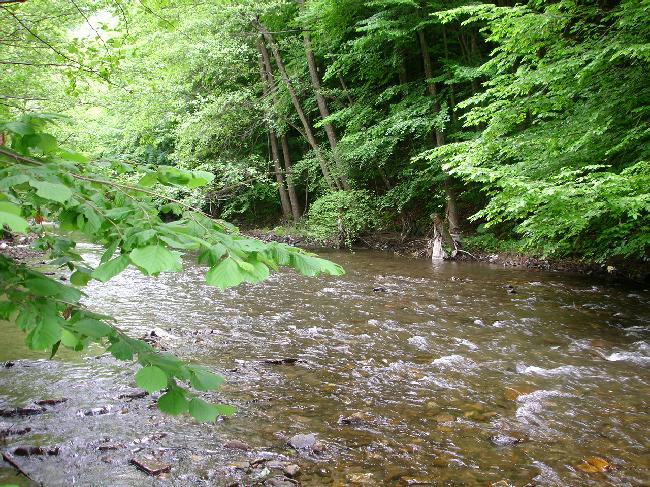
Nădrag River

Nădrag is crossed by the Padeș stream, which receives as tributaries several small streams: Cornet (near the center of the village), Izvodea (right in the center of the village), Haiduca (about 500 m or 1,600 ft downstream) and Nădrăgel (at the exit to Crivina). Padeș springs right near the peak of the same name, in the place called "Seven Springs" (Romanian: Șapte Izvoare). Its length, calculated from springs, is about 34 km (21 mi), including the part from the confluence with Cornet to Jdioara and Criciova, where it flows into Timiș River as Nădrag stream.

=== Climate ===
Although situated between hills and valleys, the influence of cyclones in the Mediterranean is felt quite strongly in Nădrag, bringing warm autumns and early thaws along the valleys. The average annual temperature is 9.8 °C (49.6 °F). The coldest month of the year is January when average temperatures of −2.8 °C (27.0 °F) are recorded, and the warmest is July when the average temperature reaches around 21 °C (70 °F). The average annual rainfall is about 924 mm (36.4 in). The lowest amounts of monthly precipitation fall in February, March, August, September and October, and the highest in June and July. During the winter the precipitations fall predominantly in the form of snow in amounts that vary between 5–25 cm (2.0–9.8 in), rarely exceeding 50–75 cm (20–30 in).

=== Flora and fauna ===
The spontaneous vegetation of the Poiana Ruscă Mountains presents elements belonging to various floristic domains: elements specific to Central Europe (beech forests), to Eastern Europe (steppes with grasses), to the Mediterranean (edible chestnut, wild lilac), elements from the sub-Carpathian lands (conifers, especially spruce), as well as elements from the Balkan lands (several species of oak, including Quercus cerris and Q. frainetto).

The beech and oak forests are populated with a series of animal species such as: fox, wolf, wild boar, squirrel, wildcat, deer, marten, etc. Birds found here include: woodpecker, cuckoo, jay, tit, eagle, capercaillie, black grouse, etc. In the forests of Nădrag, in the vicinity of the forests of Rușchița and Obreja, several families of red deer have been reported, and in Padeș some specimens of bears, passed in these territories from the forests of Hațeg and Hunedoara. Indigenous trout and rainbow trout are present on the watercourses, especially the Padeș and Cornet streams. Downstream of Nădrag, other fish species appear: chub, barbel, pike and perch, especially in the Crivina area towards Jdioara.

== History ==
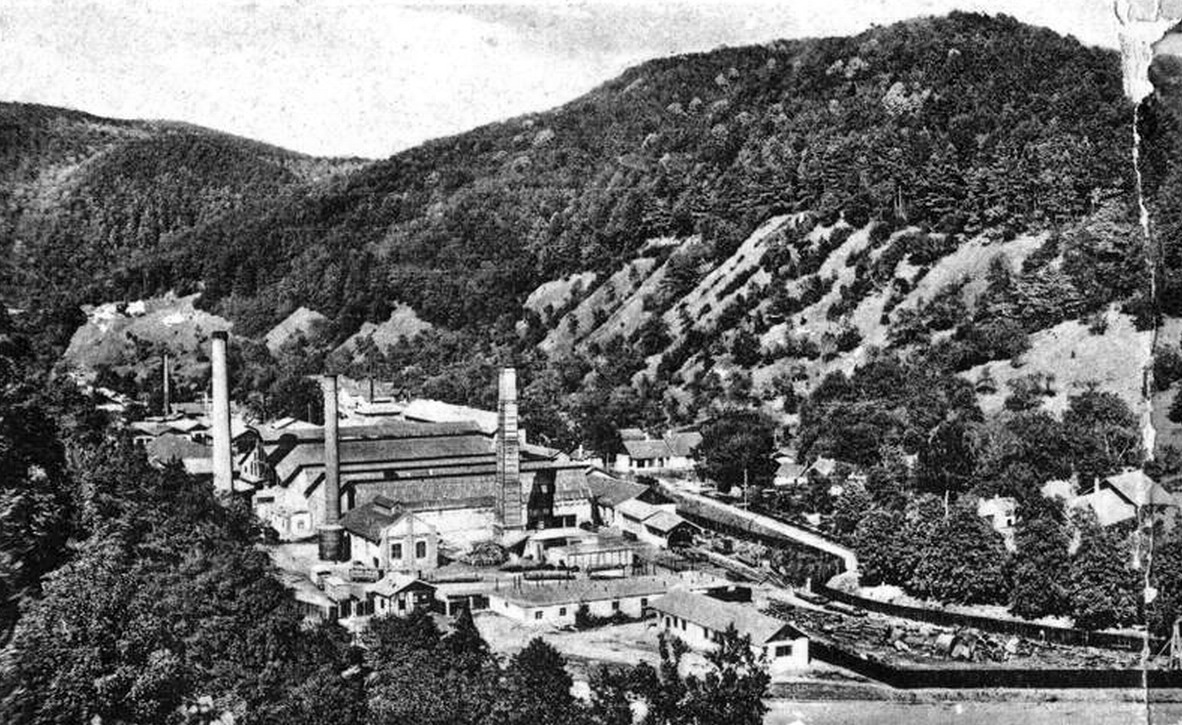
The former iron foundries and steel mills in Nădrag

The first recorded mention of Nădrag dates from 1364, in a report of the chapter from Arad, when Nodrag was a Hungarian royal property. Another mention from the Middle Ages is from 1548, when Queen Isabella Jagiellon made several donations to the prefect of Temes Petru Petrovici in Szörény County. There was also a fortress here that was destroyed in the Turkish era.

The existing ores in the area have been mined since ancient times. But modern mining in the area began only in 1845, when a Viennese company built the Zsidóvári vasgyár ironworks with its headquarters in Nădrag. The locality was developed on account of this industrial activity and was re-established on the place of the older hearth of the village. At first the factory hired German settlers sent to Banat by the Viennese company, but later Slovaks, Hungarians, Romanians and even Roma arrived, each group forming its own colony. However, most workers and miners remained German.

In 1865, for unknown reasons, locals burned over 800 ha of forest between Nădrag and Crivina, thus reducing the forested area that then covered most of the commune. In 1879 the mining company became the Nădrag Iron Industrial Company and continued its development. Thus, between 1880–1923, blast furnaces, steelworks, a foundry, a rolling mill, a machine factory and an agricultural machinery factory are built. After the union of Banat with Romania, the factory was reorganized and became part of Titan–Nădrag–Călan company. In 1938, this company had almost 5,000 employees, a large part of them in Nădrag. During the interwar period, the steel-making sections developed and more and more Romanians settled in Nădrag, who came to hold the relative majority in the 1940s.

After World War II, Nădrag and its factory will be developed within the country's industrialization plan according to the principles of the centralized economy. The Ciocanul factory becomes the most important in the area and attracts more and more inhabitants. Over the span of two decades, the population of Nădrag almost doubles, and the locality begins to have the features of a small industrial town. In addition, surveys have highlighted reserves of useful minerals in the area: gold, silver, cobalt, chromium, uranium, in addition to those of iron, lead and zinc mined earlier. The apogee of industrial development took place in the 1980s, and after the Revolution of 1989, the factory was closed, followed by an explosion of unemployment and implicitly by the exodus of the inhabitants to other localities.

== Demographics ==
Ethnic composition (2021)
1. Romanians (90.6%)
2. Hungarians (1.72%)
3. Unknown (6.87%)
4. Others (0.82%)
Religious composition (2021)
1. Orthodox (75.1%)
2. Roman Catholics (10.1%)
3. Baptists (2.91%)
4. Plymouth Brethren (1.85%)
5. Pentecostals (1.30%)
6. Unknown (7.33%)
7. Others (1.42%)

Nădrag had a population of 2,371 inhabitants at the 2021 census, down 16.4% from the 2011 census. Most inhabitants are Romanians (90.59%), with a minority of Hungarians (1.72%). For 6.87% of the population, ethnicity is unknown. By religion, most inhabitants are Orthodox (75.11%), but there are also minorities of Roman Catholics (10.08%), Baptists (2.91%), Plymouth Brethren (1.85%) and Pentecostals (1.3%). For 7.33% of the population, religious affiliation is unknown.

Census		Ethnic composition
Year	Population	Romanians	Hungarians	Germans	Ukrainians	Czechs	Slovaks
1880	1,952	823	63	610	–	–	302
1890	2,177	891	94	801	–	–	213
1900	2,659	1,234	78	1,071	2	–	149
1910	2,423	1,053	149	974	–	–	156
1920	2,127	960	65	1,016	–	–	–
1930	1,982	1,016	135	602	–	–	164
1941	1,909	1,017	123	415	–	–	–
1956	2,524	1,763	143	318	6	30	195
1966	3,647	2,730	233	412	41	35	128
1977	3,598	2,801	214	424	40	21	51
1992	3,634	3,036	155	353	46	1	19
2002	2,928	2,540	122	220	28	–	6
2011	2,836	2,547	74	94	27	–	–
2021	2,371	2,148	41	16	–	–	–

== Politics and administration ==
The commune of Nădrag is administered by a mayor and a local council composed of 10 councilors. The mayor, Liviu Muntean, from the Social Democratic Party, has been in office since 2004. As from the 2024 local elections, the local council has the following composition by political parties:

Party	Seats	Composition
Social Democratic Party	7	
Save Romania Union–People's Movement Party–Force of the Right	2	
National Liberal Party	1	
