= Traian Vuia =

Romanian inventor and aviation pioneer (1872–1950)

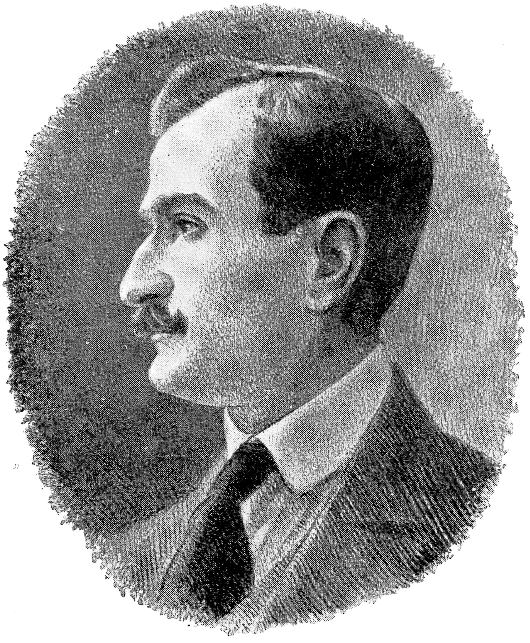
- Vuia, c. 1920
- Born: 17 August 1872; Bujor, Austria-Hungary
- Died: 3 September 1950 (aged 78); Bucharest, Romania
- Resting place: Bellu Cemetery, Bucharest; 44°24′21″N 26°05′59″E
- Occupation: Inventor
- Known for: Early flying machine

Traian Vuia or Trajan Vuia (Romanian pronunciation: [traˈjan ˈvuja]; 17 August 1872 – 3 September 1950) was a Romanian inventor and aviation pioneer who designed, built, and tested the first tractor monoplane. He was the first to demonstrate that a flying machine could rise into the air by running on wheels on an ordinary road. He is credited with a powered hop of 11 m (36 ft) made on 18 March 1906, and he later claimed a powered hop of 24 m (79 ft). Though unsuccessful in sustained flight, Vuia's invention influenced Louis Blériot in designing monoplanes. Later, Vuia also designed helicopters.

A French citizen from 1918, Vuia led the Romanians (especially Transylvanians) of France in the Resistance during World War II. He returned to Romania just before his death in 1950.

== Education and early career ==
Vuia was born to Romanian parents—Simion Popescu, a priest, and his second wife, Ana Vuia—living in Surducul Mic and/or Bujor, where he attended the local primary school, and Făget, a village in the Banat region, Austro-Hungarian Empire, (modern-day Romania); the place is now called Traian Vuia.

From 1884, he attended the Roman Catholic high school in Lugoj and graduated in 1892. He then enrolled in the School of Mechanics at the Polytechnic University of Budapest where he received his engineering diploma. He then joined the Faculty of Law in Budapest, Hungary, where he earned a PhD in law in May 1901 with the thesis "Military and Industry, State and Contract Regime."

He returned to Lugoj, where he studied the problem of human flight and designed his first flying machine, which he called the "airplane-car". He attempted to build the machine, but due to financial constraints decided to go to Paris in July 1902, hoping to find someone interested in financing his project, possibly balloon enthusiasts. He met with considerable skepticism from people who believed that a heavier-than-air machine could not fly. He then visited Victor Tatin, the well-known theoretician and experimenter who had built an aircraft model which flew in 1879. Tatin was interested in the project, but doubted that Vuia had a suitable engine or that his aircraft would be stable. Vuia then presented his plan to the Académie des Sciences in Paris on 16 February 1903, but was rejected with the comment "The problem of flight with a machine which weighs more than air can not be solved and it is only a dream."

Undeterred, Vuia applied for a French patent on 15 May 1903, and obtained patent No. 332106 for his design. He began to build his first flying machine in 1902–1903. Overcoming more financial difficulties, he also started construction of an engine of his own design for which he was granted various patents, the first in 1904.

== Flying experiments ==
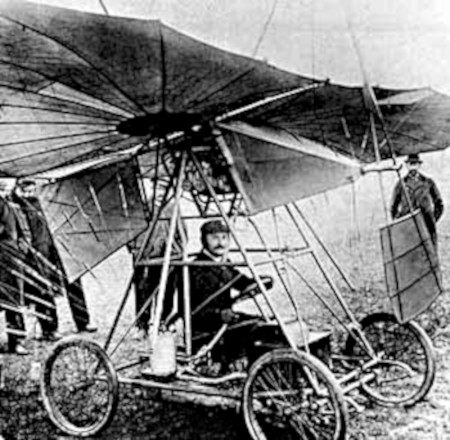
Traian Vuia in his Vuia I flying machine in 1906

By December 1905, Vuia had finished construction of his first airplane, the "Vuia I". It was a high-wing monoplane constructed entirely of steel tubing. The basic framework consisted of a pair of triangular frames, the lower members forming the sides of the rectangular chassis which bore four pneumatic-tyred wheels, the front pair steerable. The wing was mounted on the apices of these frames and resembled those of Otto Lilienthal's gliders, with curved steel tubes radiating outwards from centres at the apex of each of the side frames, braced by wires attached to a pair of kingposts, and covered in varnished linen. Pitch control was achieved by varying the angle of attack of the wing. A trapezoidal rudder was mounted behind and below the wing. It was powered by a carbonic acid gas engine driving a single tractor propeller. The 19 kW (25 hp) engine had to be adapted by Vuia as a suitable engine was not available. Liquid carbon dioxide was vaporized in a Serpollet boiler and fed to a Serpollet engine. The fuel supply was enough for a running time of about five minutes at full power. The aircraft was constructed for Vuia by the Parisian engineering company of Hockenjos and Schmitt.

Vuia chose a site in Montesson, near Paris, for testing. At first, he used the machine without the wings mounted so he could gather experience controlling it on the ground. The wings were put on in March and on 18 March 1906, it lifted off briefly. After accelerating for about 50 m (160 ft), the aircraft left the ground and traveled through the air at a height of about 1 m (3 ft 3 in) for a distance of about 12 m (39 ft), but then the engine cut out and it came down. Caught by the wind, it was blown against a tree and damaged. On 19 August a longer hop of 24 m (79 ft) at a height of about 2.5 m (8 ft) was made, ending in a heavy landing which damaged the propeller.

In August 1906, he modified the aircraft, reducing the camber of the wing and adding an elevator. In this form, it is sometimes called the Vuia I-bis. The British aviation historian Charles Harvard Gibbs-Smith described this aircraft as "the first man-carrying monoplane of basically modern configuration", yet "unsuccessful" because it was incapable of sustained flight.

The French journal L'Aérophile emphasized that Vuia's machine had the capability to take off from a flat surface, without assistance such as an incline, rails, or catapult. At the time Europe was aware of the efforts of the Wright brothers who on 17 December 1903, had flown their Wright Flyer from level ground using a dolly undercarriage running on a guide rail into a 30 km/h (20 mph) headwind, though few yet recognised the achievement. The Wrights had made sustained and controlled flights in a complete circuit by September 1904.

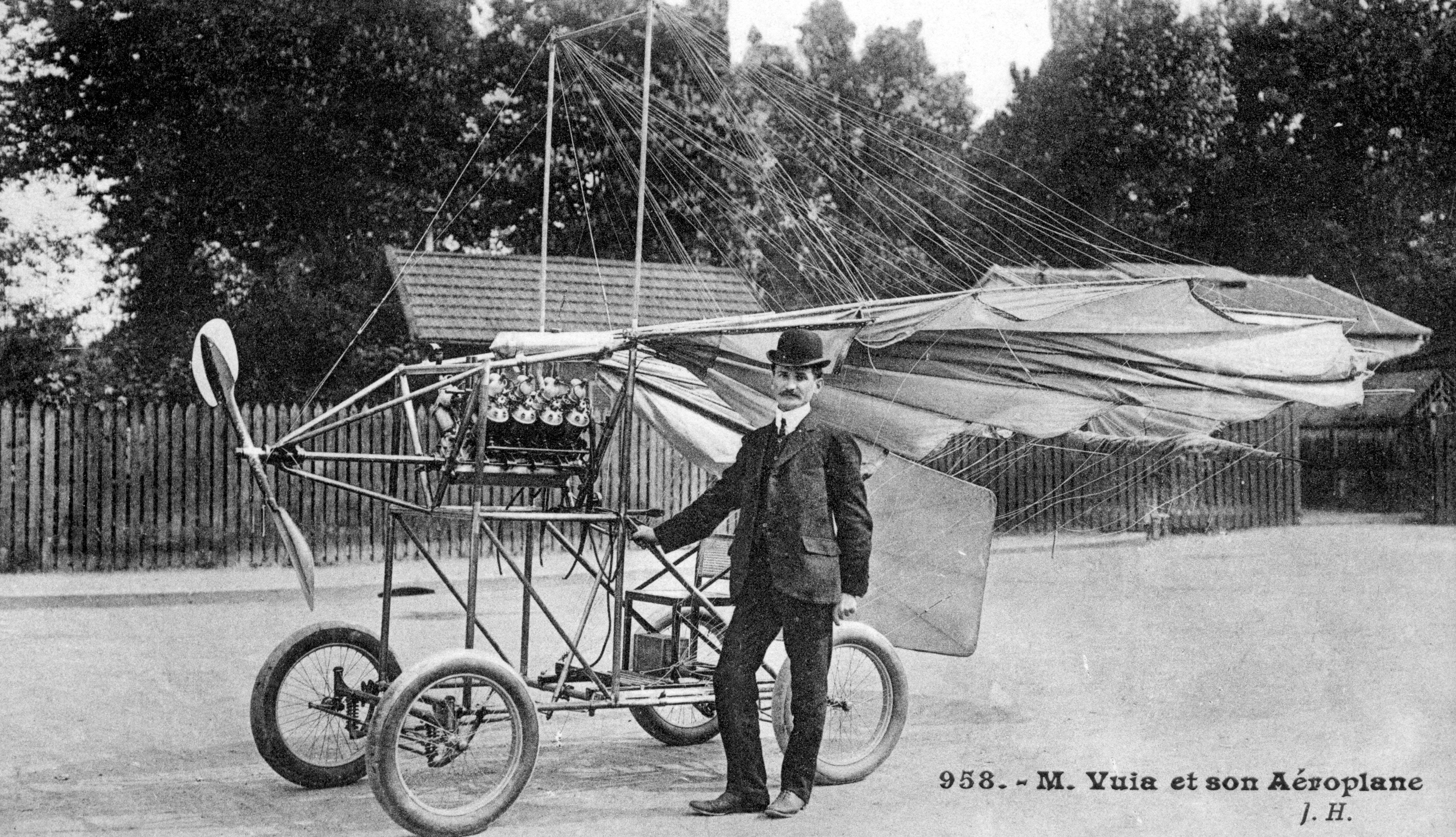
A postcard of Vuia and his 1907 airplane Vuia II, shown here with folded wings

In 1907, Vuia built the Vuia II, using an Antoinette 19 kW (25 hp) internal combustion engine. This aircraft had the same basic configuration as the Vuia I-bis, but was smaller and lighter, with a total weight (including pilot) of 210 kg (460 lb) and a wingspan of 7.9 metres (26 ft). Vuia succeeded in making a brief powered hop on 5 July, traveling 20 m (66 ft), but damaging the aircraft and suffering slight injuries on landing. No further attempts were made to fly the aircraft.

Charles Dollfus, former curator of the Air Museum in Paris, wrote that aviation pioneer Alberto Santos Dumont's use of wheels on his aircraft was influenced by Dumont's having seen Vuia's flight attempts.

== Documentation ==
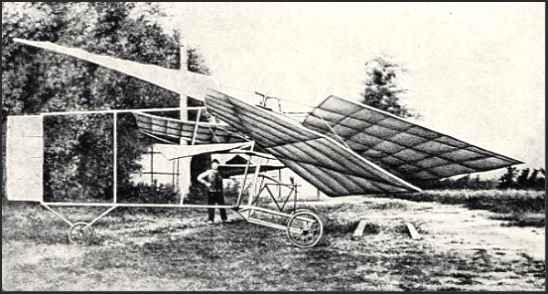
Vuia helicopter 1918

Vuia made his first powered hop on 18 March 1906, on a flat field at Montesson, near Paris, France. The flight took place in the presence of his mechanic and two close friends. The airplane, Vuia 1, lifted one meter off the ground and flew for 12 meters. Accounts of this test published at the time, and of his later airborne tests, until 19 August 1906, are based on letters he wrote to L'Aérophile, the official journal of the Aéro Club of France. Vuia made the first known public demonstration of his airplane on 8 October 1906, when he became airborne for four meters, witnessed by Ernest Archdeacon and Édouard Surcouf. Another journal of the period, Flight, credited him with a five-meter hop on 8 October 1906, as the earliest entry in a list of his tests shown in a table of "the performances which have been made by the most prominent aviators of the last few years."

== Later career ==
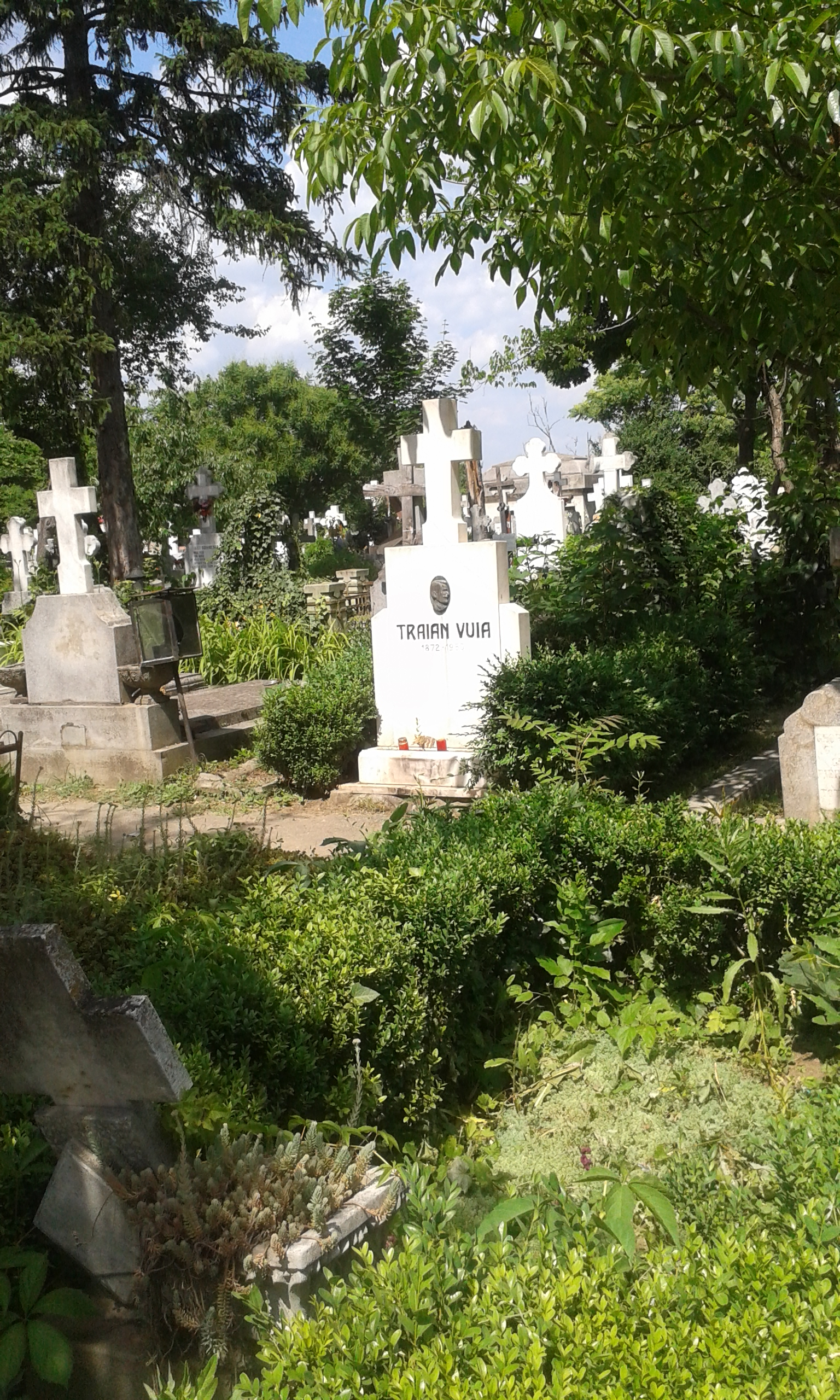
Vuia's tomb at Bellu Cemetery

Between 1918 and 1921, Vuia built two experimental helicopters on the Juvisy and Issy-les-Moulineaux aerodromes.

Traian Vuia was a socialist and a friend of Petru Groza, who invited him to return to Romania in 1950.

He is buried at Bellu Cemetery in Bucharest, Romania.

== Legacy ==
Another invention by Vuia was a steam generator with internal combustion that generates very high pressure—more than 100 atm (10 MPa)—that is still used today in thermal power stations. Traian Vuia and one of his partners, Emmanuel Yvonneau, patented several types of gas generators.

On 27 May 1946, Vuia was named an honorary member of the Romanian Academy.

His birthplace, Bujoru, in Timiș County was renamed Traian Vuia after his death.

Timișoara International Airport Traian Vuia (TSR), Romania's third largest airport, carries his name. High schools in Bucharest, Craiova, Făget, Focșani, Galați, Oradea, Reșița, Satu Mare, Târgu Jiu, and Tăuții-Măgherăuș are named after him, and so is a boulevard in Galați and streets in Bucharest, Cluj-Napoca, Galați, Hunedoara, Otopeni, Suceava, and Timișoara.

== Gallery ==
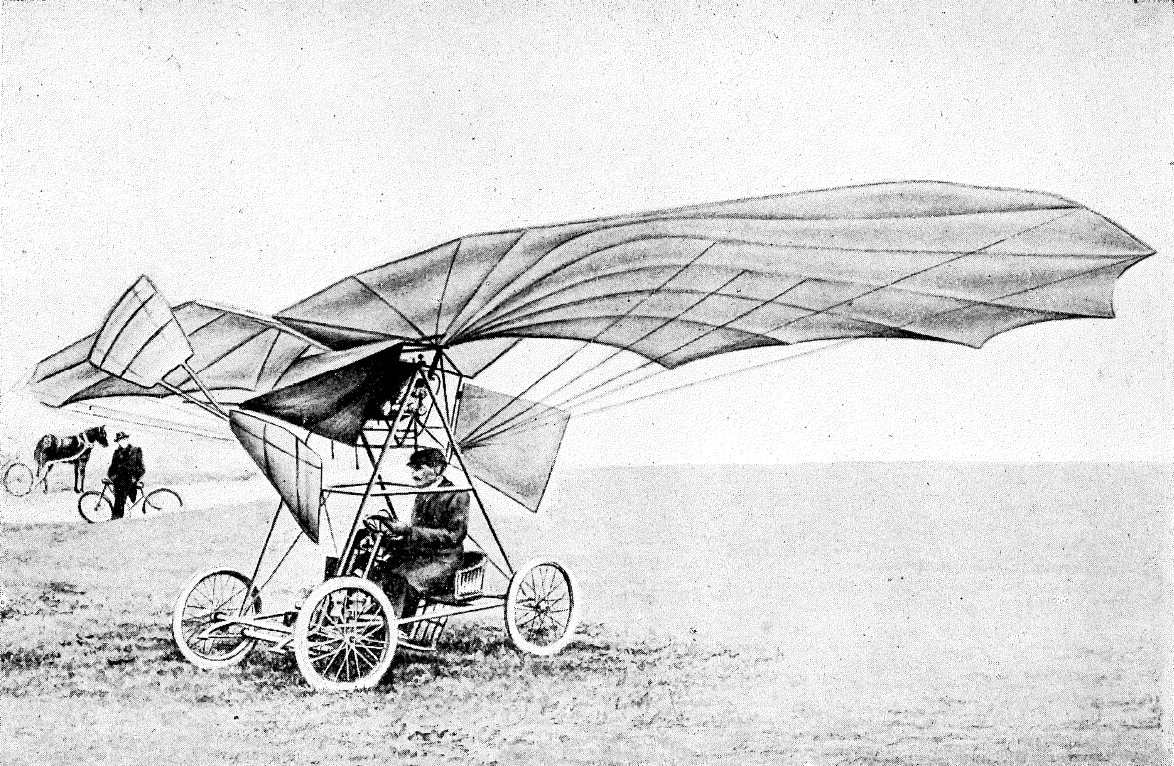
Vuia I

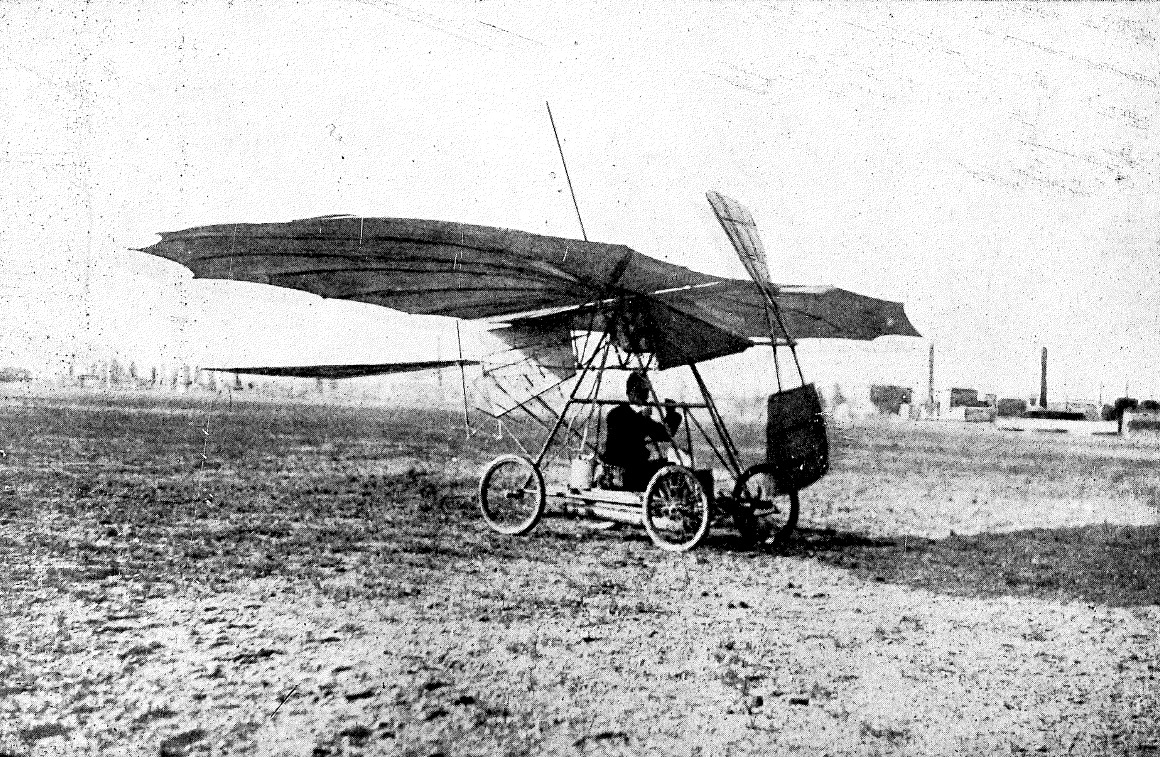
Vuia I

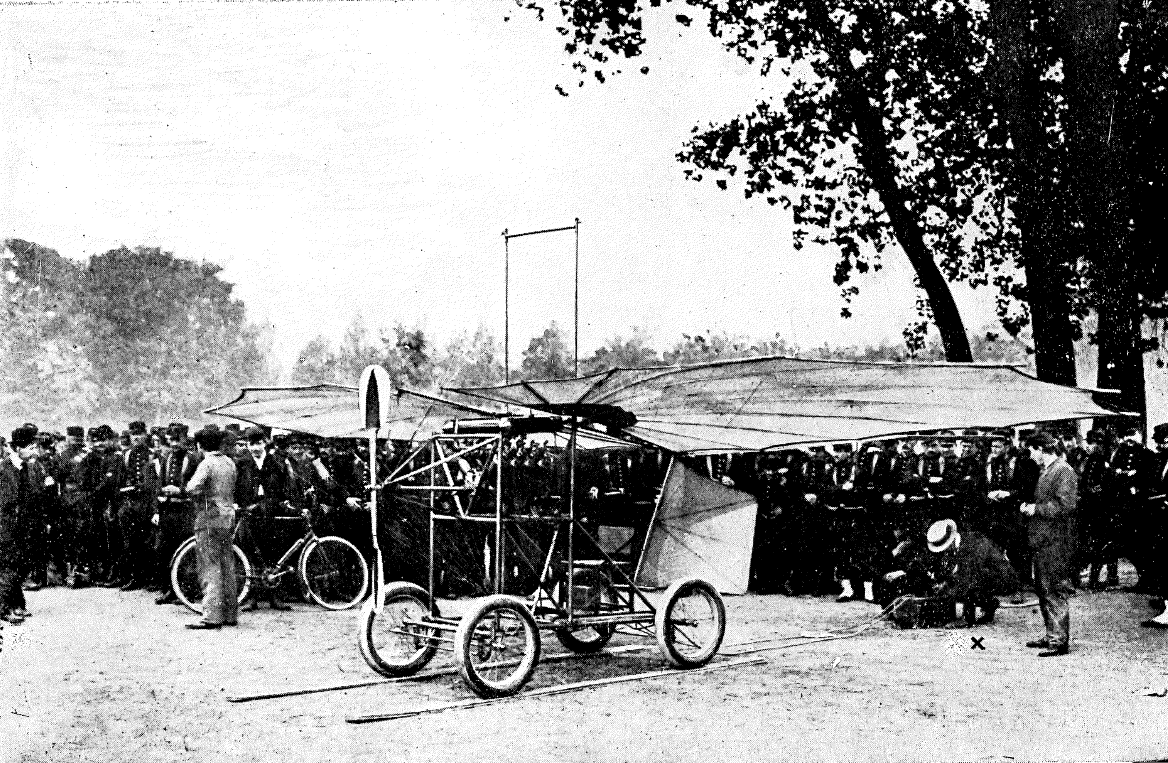
Vuia II

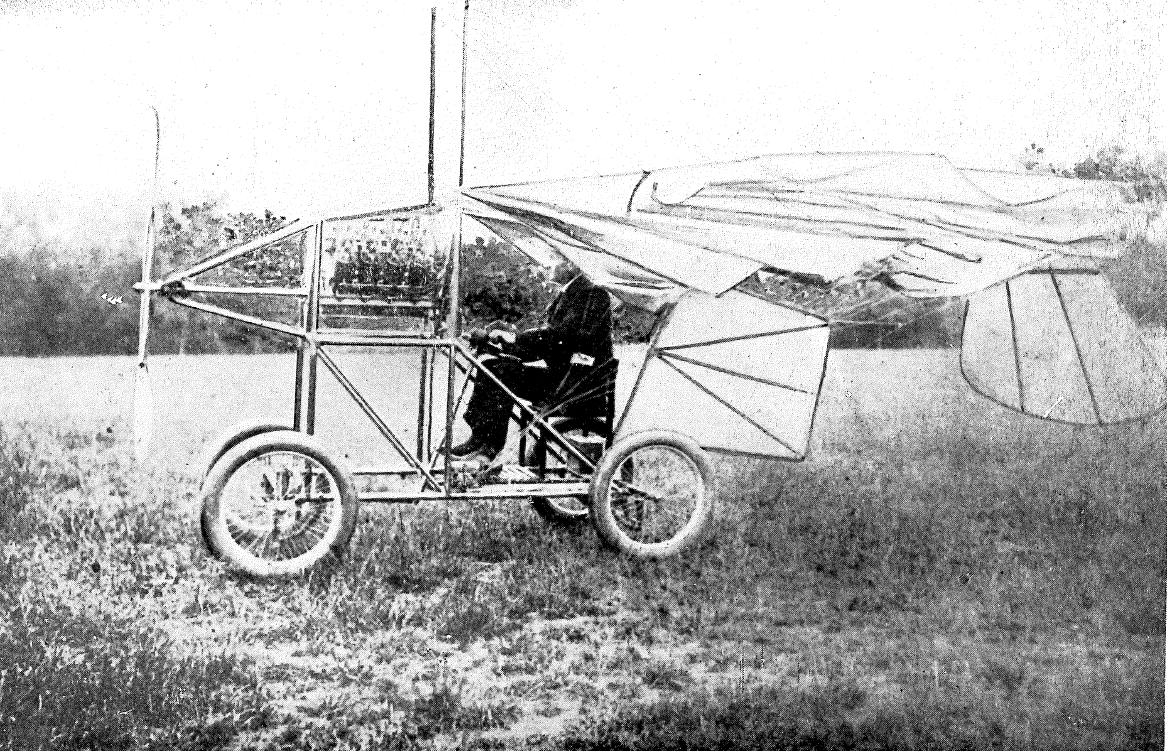
Vuia II

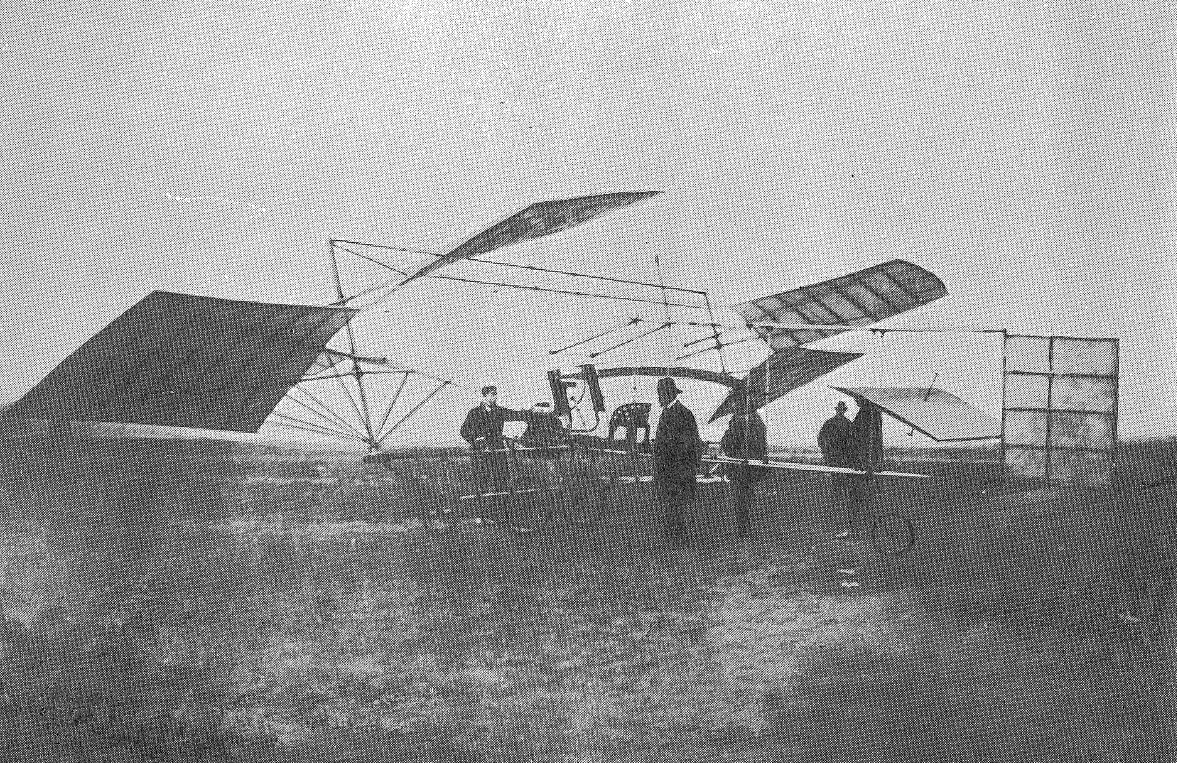
Vuia helicopter

== See also ==
- History of aviation
- List of aviation pioneers
- Early flying machines
- Alberto Santos-Dumont
- Clement Ader
- Du Temple Monoplane
- Richard Pearse
- Gustave Whitehead
- John Joseph Montgomery
