= Criciova =

- Commune
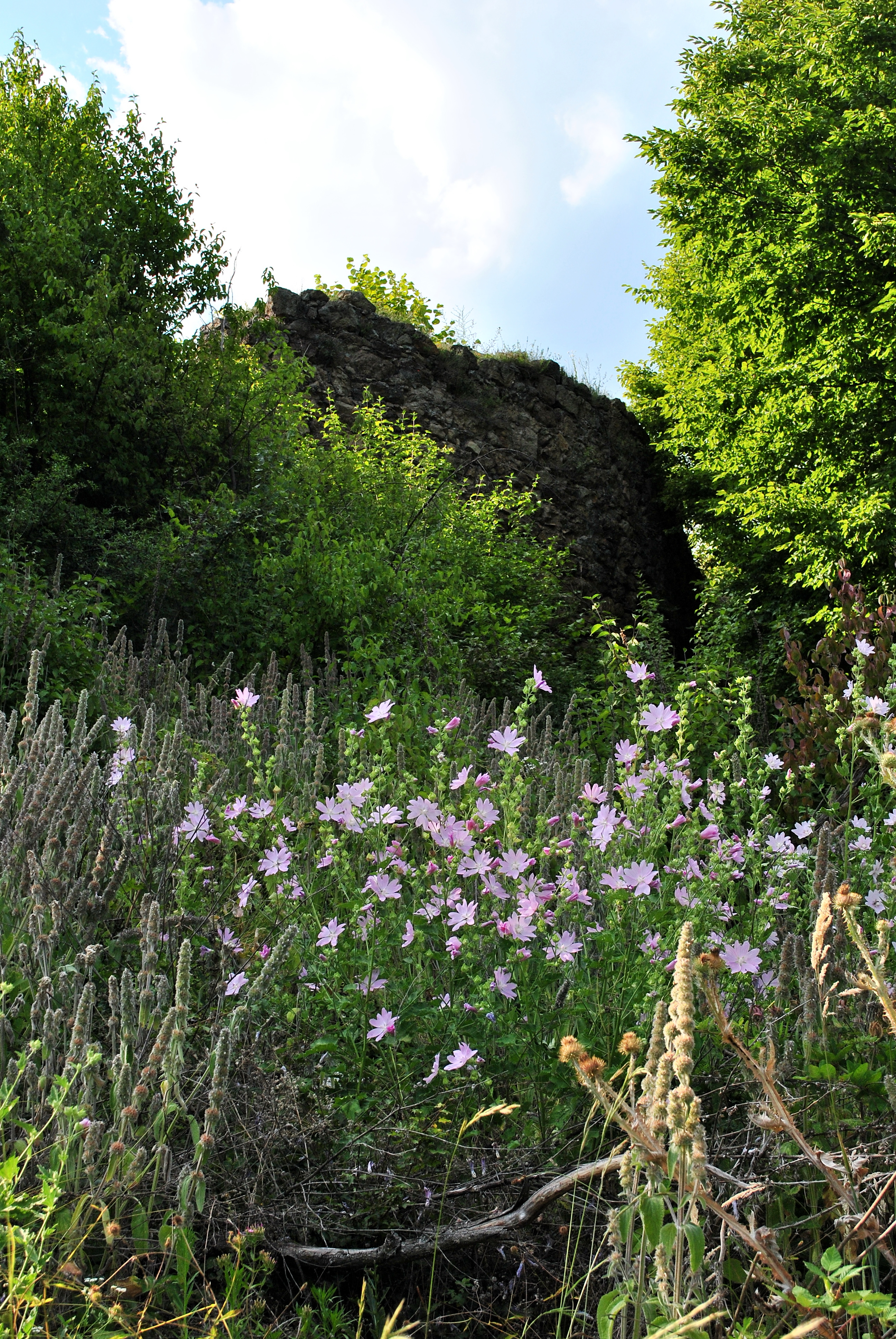
- Ruins of the Jdioara Fortress

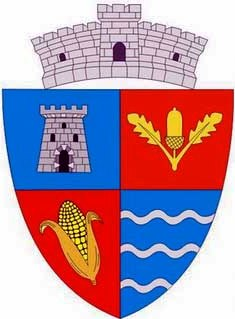
- Coat of arms

- Location in Timiș County

- Location in Romania
- Coordinates: 45°38′N 22°4′E
- Country: Romania
- County: Timiș

Government
  - Mayor (2024–): Cristian-Iosif Cătană (PSD)
- Area: 50.51 km^{2} (19.50 sq mi)
- Population (2021-12-01): 1,493
  - Density: 29.56/km^{2} (76.56/sq mi)
- Time zone: UTC+02:00 (EET)
  - Summer (DST): UTC+03:00 (EEST)
- Postal code: 307130–307133
- Vehicle reg.: TM
- Website: www.primariacriciova.ro

Criciova (Hungarian: Kricsó; German: Kritschau; Ukrainian: Кричова) is a commune in Timiș County, Romania. It is composed of four villages: Cireșu, Cireșu Mic (depopulated), Criciova (commune seat) and Jdioara.

== History ==
Criciova was first mentioned in 1444 as Krychyowa, although it is much older. The fragments of masonry discovered here in the late 1970s attest that the village has existed since Roman Dacia.

The first recorded mention of Cireșu is found in a Hungarian diploma from 1603, in which it appears with the name Cziresul. Marsigli mentions in his notes from 1690–1700 the locality of Csíres or Cserestömös, in the Timiș River meadow. Around 1900, Ukrainians woodcutters began to settle on the hearth of the village, coming to work on the estates of Hungarian lords. In 1964, Cireșu incorporated the old village of Cireșu Nou, which had 129 inhabitants in 1966. Also, the hamlet of Cireșu Mic, once a colony of Ukrainian miners, belonged to Cireșu. It then became an independent village, but today it is completely depopulated.

The history of Jdioara is closely related to the homonymous medieval fortress, located about one kilometer northeast of the village, on one of the peaks that form the mountain ends towards the Timiș Valley, today only ruins. Several hypotheses have been issued about its establishment, among which the one circulated by Romanian historian Vasile Maniu, who claimed that it was founded in the 2nd–3rd centuries, during the Roman colonization. Hungarian historians have claimed that the name of the fortress comes from the Hungarian Zydoy family, who allegedly built the fortress. It is certain that the first recorded mention of Jdioara dates from 1320, but most probably the fortress was built before this date. In the 10th–11th centuries, the fortress was probably included in Glad's voivodeship. The fortress has suffered two major sieges throughout its history. The first one took place in 1387, when the Banat nobles revolted against the central authority and occupied the fortress. The revolt was eventually suppressed, and the fortress came under the jurisdiction of the Ban of Severin, László Loszonczy, appointed commander of the fortresses of Severin, Orșova and Jdioara. The second major siege took place in May 1600 by the troops of Michael the Brave, for several days. Jdioara Fortress was destroyed after the Treaty of Karlowitz, probably subject to the conditions of the treaty which involved, among other things, the destruction of all the fortresses in Banat.

== Demographics ==
Ethnic composition (2021)
1. Romanians (84.5%)
2. Ukrainians (4.08%)
3. Unknown (10.6%)
4. Others (0.88%)
Religious composition (2021)
1. Orthodox (71.9%)
2. Baptists (8.03%)
3. Pentecostals (6.69%)
4. Unknown (11.3%)
5. Others (2.11%)

Criciova had a population of 1,493 inhabitants at the 2021 census, down 5.92% from the 2011 census. Most inhabitants are Romanians (84.46%), with a minority of Ukrainians (4.08%). For 10.58% of the population, ethnicity is unknown. By religion, most inhabitants are Orthodox (71.86%), but there are also minorities of Baptists (8.03%) and Pentecostals (6.69%). For 11.31% of the population, religious affiliation is unknown.

Census		Ethnic composition
Year	Population	Romanians	Hungarians	Germans	Ukrainians
1880	2,464	2,323	32	89	–
1890	2,772	2,381	50	39	1
1900	2,918	2,608	65	139	–
1910	3,318	2,659	29	33	229
1920	3,247	2,812	10	9	–
1930	3,504	2,389	5	11	605
1941	3,181	2,309	14	9	–
1956	2,652	2,161	10	7	467
1966	2,509	2,067	11	5	426
1977	2,310	1,905	6	–	359
1992	1,774	1,474	8	1	288
2002	1,716	1,472	6	1	218
2011	1,587	1,355	–	–	146
2021	1,493	1,261	–	–	61

== Politics and administration ==
The commune of Criciova is administered by a mayor and a local council composed of 10 councilors. The mayor, Cristian-Iosif Cătană, from the Social Democratic Party, has been in office since 2024. As from the 2024 local elections, the local council has the following composition by political parties:

Party	Seats	Composition
Social Democratic Party	5	
National Liberal Party	3	
Alliance for the Union of Romanians	2	
