= Traian Vuia, Timiș =

Traian Vuia
- Commune
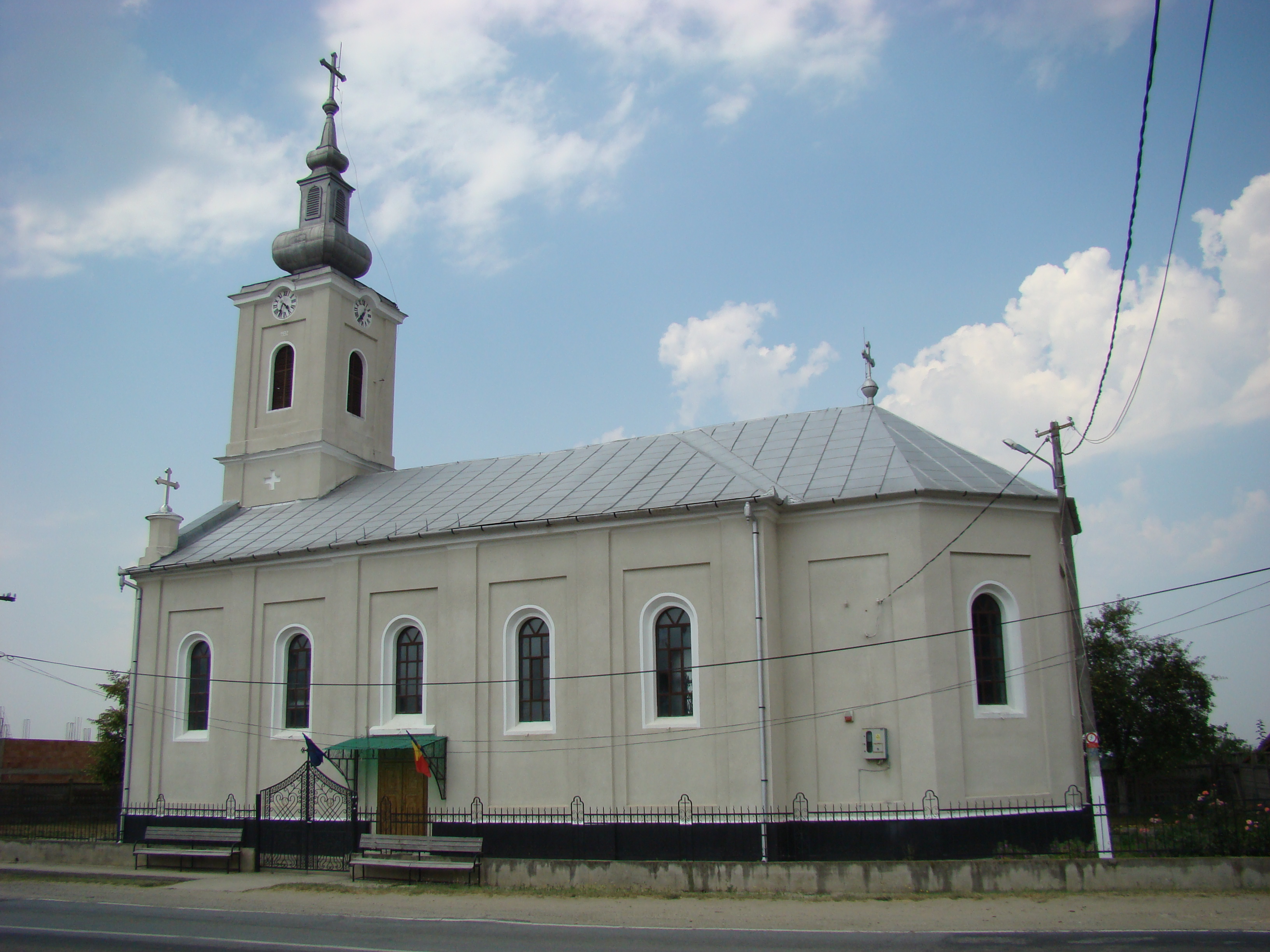
- The Orthodox church in Traian Vuia

- Location in Timiș County

- Location in Romania
- Coordinates: 45°48′N 22°4′E
- Country: Romania
- County: Timiș

Government
  - Mayor (2016–): Vasile-Bujor Petruescu (PSD)
- Area: 69.75 km^{2} (26.93 sq mi)
- Population (2021-12-01): 2,130
  - Density: 30.5/km^{2} (79.1/sq mi)
- Time zone: UTC+02:00 (EET)
  - Summer (DST): UTC+03:00 (EEST)
- Postal code: 307435–307441
- Vehicle reg.: TM
- Website: comunatraianvuia.ro

Traian Vuia (known as Bujor until 1950; Hungarian: Bozsor; German: Boschur; Serbian: Божур, romanized: Božur) is a commune in Timiș County, Romania. It is composed of six villages: Jupani, Săceni, Sudriaș (commune seat), Surducu Mic, Susani and Traian Vuia.

It was the birthplace of inventor and aviator Traian Vuia (1872–1950). It was renamed to commemorate him after his death. Traian Vuia is located near Lake Surduc.

== History ==
=== Traian Vuia ===
The first recorded mention of Bujor dates from 1364. The locality had a high importance in the Middle Ages, being the center of a Vlach district. In 1453 this district had a knyaz, Dionysius, and was donated by King Ladislaus V to John Hunyadi. In 1596 the Bujor District was part of Hunyad County. Within its borders there was at that time the village of Baia, and a little further the village of Chitești, both disappeared.

In the past, the center of the village was in the Gladna Valley, on the place called Satul Mic ("Little Village"). Due to the frequent floods, in 1823 the village was moved to its present place, protected from floods.

=== Jupani ===
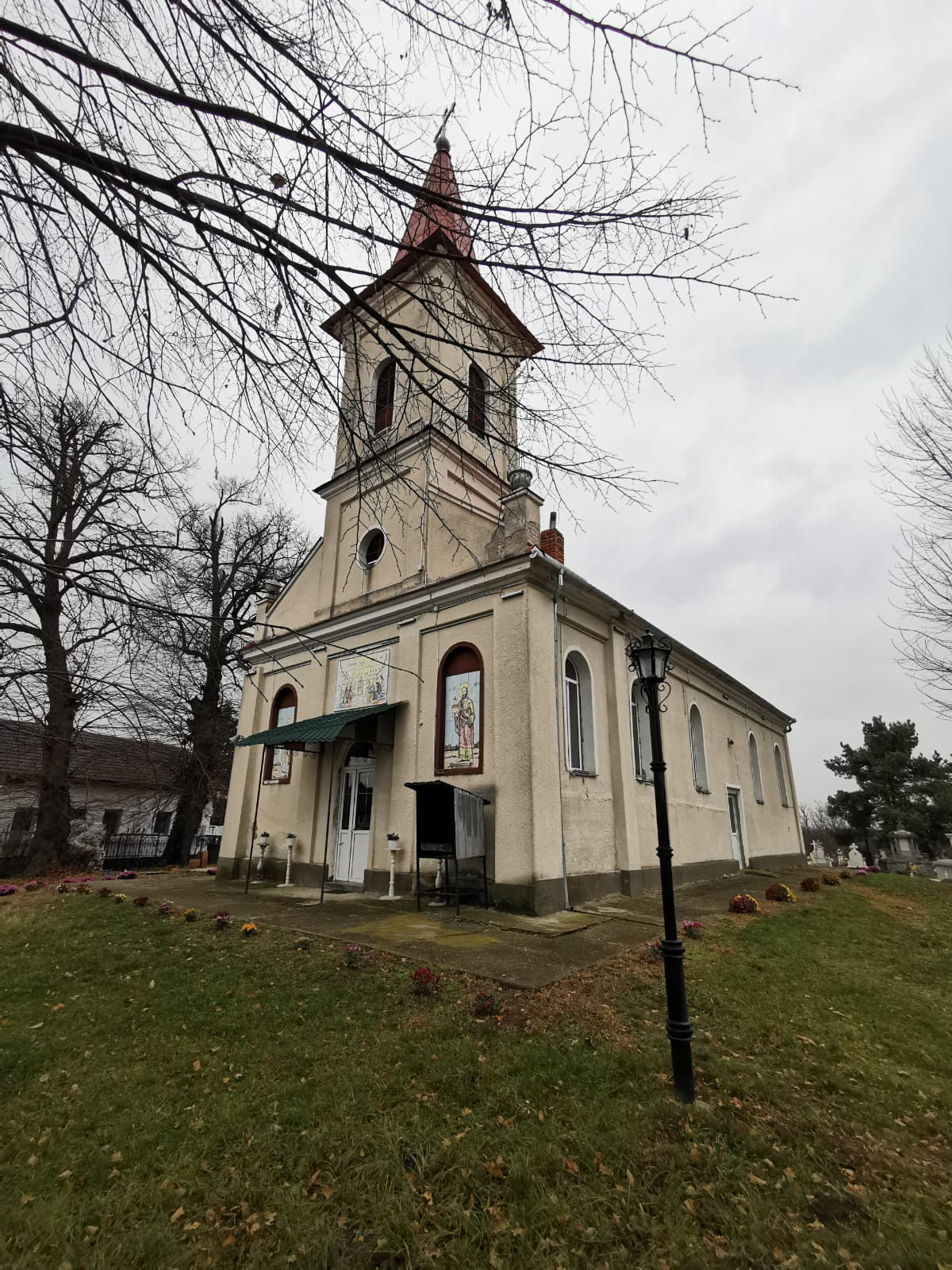
The Orthodox church in Jupani

The earliest recorded mention of Jupani dates back to 1446, in a Hungarian charter through which John Hunyadi ceded the Bujor District—including Jupani—in exchange for the fortresses of Șoimoș and Lipova. However, the settlement may be older, as its name derives from jupâni and evokes the residences of Romanian-Slavic rulers dating back to the 9th century.

During the Middle Ages, there were two separate villages: Jupanii de Sus ("Upper Jupani") and Jupanii de Jos ("Lower Jupani"), which eventually merged into one. A Hungarian charter from 1470 confirms that the village was inhabited by Vlachs (Romanians). The settlement persisted through the period of Ottoman occupation, as noted in the writings of Marsigli between 1690 and 1700. It retained its Romanian identity throughout the Habsburg era, even during the colonization of the Banat region. The Orthodox church was constructed in 1888.

=== Săceni ===
The earliest recorded mention of Săceni dates back to 1596, when Voivode Sigismund Báthory granted the settlement to István Jósika. There are no records from the Ottoman period, and the village is absent from Marsigli's writings. It reappears in the Austrian census of 1717 under the name Sezsany, with 15 houses and part of the Făget District. The Orthodox church was built in 1850.

Around 1900, Hungarian authorities settled several Hungarian families in the village. Within a few years, they outnumbered the native Romanian population, and during the interwar period, Hungarians formed the majority. After World War II, many Hungarians began to leave, and Romanians once again became the dominant group. Today, Hungarians make up just 16% of the population, closely followed by Ukrainians, whose numbers have grown significantly over the past decade.

=== Sudriaș ===
The earliest documented mention of Sudriaș dates back to 1371. It served as the center of a medieval Vlach district and held market rights. The village continued to exist during the Ottoman period, as Marsigli references it in his writings from 1690 to 1700. In the 1717 conscription, it is listed under the name Sudriasch. During the medieval era, three other villages—Kaposala, Chitești, and Drăgoiești—were located near Sudriaș but have since disappeared. The Orthodox church was constructed in 1883.

=== Surducu Mic ===
The earliest documented mention of Surducu Mic dates back to 1511. In Marsigli's writings from 1690 to 1700, the village is referred to as Sordok. By the 1717 census, it had 15 houses. Traian Vuia was born here in 1872.

=== Susani ===
The earliest recorded mention of Susani dates back to 1598. It is referenced in Marsigli's writings from 1690 to 1700. By 1717, the village had 20 houses and belonged to the Făget District. The Orthodox church was constructed in 1912.

== Demographics ==
Ethnic composition (2021)
1. Romanians (84.4%)
2. Roma (5.63%)
3. Others (10.0%)
Religious composition (2021)
1. Orthodox (71.1%)
2. Pentecostals (14.6%)
3. Baptists (2.81%)
4. Roman Catholics (1.31%)
5. Unknown (9.53%)
6. Others (0.59%)

Traian Vuia had a population of 2,130 inhabitants at the 2021 census, up 3.45% from the 2011 census. Most inhabitants are Romanians (84.36%), with a minority of Roma (5.63%). By religion, most inhabitants are Orthodox (71.12%), but there are also minorities of Pentecostals (14.64%), Baptists (2.81%) and Roman Catholics (1.31%). For 9.53% of the population, religious affiliation is unknown.

Census		Ethnic composition
Year	Population	Romanians	Hungarians	Germans	Roma	Ukrainians
1880	2,963	2,866	31	57	–	–
1890	3,197	3,078	54	41	–	–
1900	3,576	3,412	105	31	–	–
1910	4,134	3,574	438	34	–	–
1920	3,506	3,301	195	3	–	–
1930	3,697	3,308	282	36	55	–
1941	3,870	3,421	276	41	–	–
1956	3,350	3,079	172	4	93	–
1966	3,188	3,030	134	5	19	–
1977	3,005	2,819	91	1	87	6
1992	2,404	2,254	73	2	69	4
2002	2,241	2,015	52	5	118	51
2011	2,059	1,826	15	–	114	40
2021	2,130	1,797	12	–	120	4

== Politics and administration ==
The commune of Traian Vuia is administered by a mayor and a local council composed of 11 councilors. The mayor, Vasile-Bujor Petruescu, from the Social Democratic Party, has been in office since 2016. As from the 2024 local elections, the local council has the following composition by political parties:

Party	Seats	Composition
Social Democratic Party	5	
Alliance for the Union of Romanians	3	
Party of the Roma	1	
Save Romania Union	1	
S.O.S. Romania	1	

== Economy ==
The commune's main economic activities include agriculture, forestry, wood processing, and tourism. Livestock farming is well-developed and plays a significant role in many households.
