= Fârdea =

- Commune
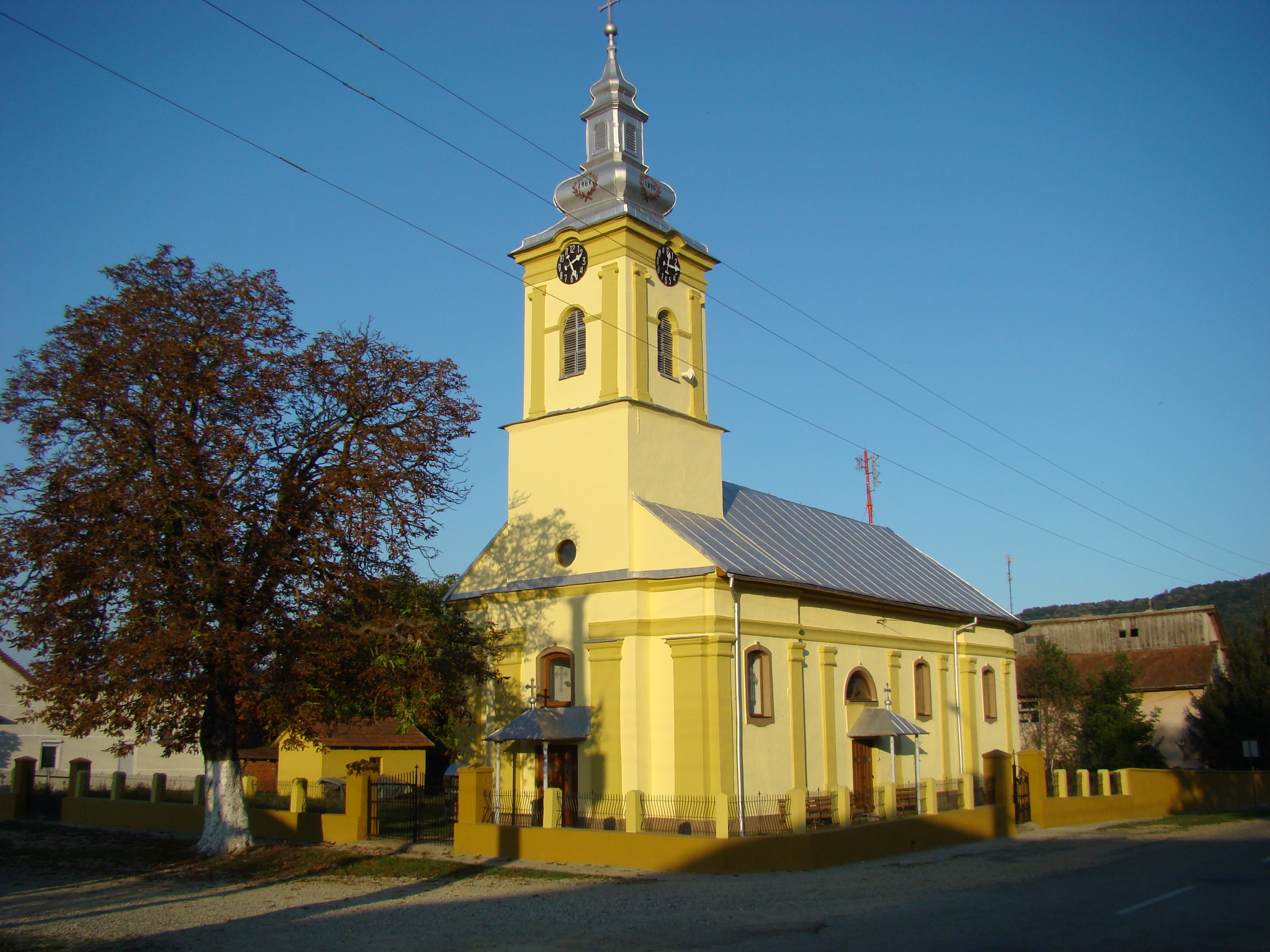
- The Orthodox church in Fârdea

- Location in Timiș County

- Location in Romania
- Coordinates: 45.7389°N 22.1603°E
- Country: Romania
- County: Timiș

Government
  - Mayor (2020–): Maria-Rovena-Violeta Dobrean (PSD)
- Area: 131.06 km^{2} (50.60 sq mi)
- Population (2021-12-01): 1,562
  - Density: 11.92/km^{2} (30.87/sq mi)
- Time zone: UTC+02:00 (EET)
  - Summer (DST): UTC+03:00 (EEST)
- Postal code: 307165–307172
- Vehicle reg.: TM
- Website: primariafirdea.ro

Fârdea (Hungarian: Ferde; German: Ferden; Serbian: Фердија, romanized: Ferdija) is a commune in Timiș County, Romania. It is composed of seven villages: Drăgșinești, Fârdea (commune seat), Gladna Montană, Gladna Română, Hăuzești, Mâtnicu Mic and Zolt.

== Geography ==
Fârdea is located in the eastern extremity of Timiș County, at the foot of Poiana Ruscă Mountains. The relief has the appearance of a huge amphitheater descending from the edges of the commune to the central depression valleys with some steep hills in the southeast and softer ones in the northwest.

== History ==
Fârdea was first mentioned in a Hungarian diploma in 1361. It was one of the most important medieval settlements in Banat, where a Vlach district has existed since ancient times. In the 14th–15th centuries it was called Turd, which comes from Furd, a personal name mentioned around 1291. In a document from 1454, the chapter from Arad reports to Ladislaus V that John Hunyadi became the owner of the Romanian district of Twerd. The document mentions that this district included the villages of Bănia, Lower and Upper Gladna, Prodanfalva, Zolthur, Cărămida, Dryinfalva, Brekafalva, Lower and Upper Igazfalva, Puril, Mâtnic, Boglyafalva, Costenești and Stefanfalva, many of which no longer exist. At the end of the 15th century, the district no longer belonged to Temes County, but to Hunyad County.

== Demographics ==
Ethnic composition (2021)
1. Romanians (92.6%)
2. Others (7.37%)
Religious composition (2021)
1. Orthodox (81.0%)
2. Baptists (5.56%)
3. Pentecostals (4.99%)
4. Unknown (6.72%)
5. Others (1.69%)

Fârdea had a population of 1,562 inhabitants at the 2021 census, down 10.74% from the 2011 census. Most inhabitants are Romanians (92.63%). By religion, most inhabitants are Orthodox (81.04%), but there are also minorities of Baptists (5.56%) and Pentecostals (4.99%). For 6.72% of the population, religious affiliation is unknown.

Census		Ethnic composition
Year	Population	Romanians	Roma
1880	3,271	3,135	–
1890	3,281	3,161	–
1900	3,430	3,273	–
1910	3,470	3,316	–
1920	3,277	3,226	–
1930	3,217	3,150	31
1941	3,172	3,149	–
1956	2,846	2,842	–
1966	3,164	3,144	–
1977	2,899	2,781	88
1992	2,164	2,086	46
2002	1,919	1,845	48
2011	1,750	1,649	26
2021	1,562	1,447	4

== Politics and administration ==
The commune of Fârdea is administered by a mayor and a local council composed of 11 councilors. The mayor, Maria-Rovena-Violeta Dobrean, from the Social Democratic Party, has been in office since 2020. As from the 2024 local elections, the local council has the following composition by political parties:

Party	Seats	Composition
Social Democratic Party	7	
National Liberal Party–Social Liberal Humanist Party	2	
Alliance for the Union of Romanians	1	
Romanian Ecologist Party	1	

== Notable people ==
- Virgil Simonescu (1881–1941), painter and art critic

== Gallery ==
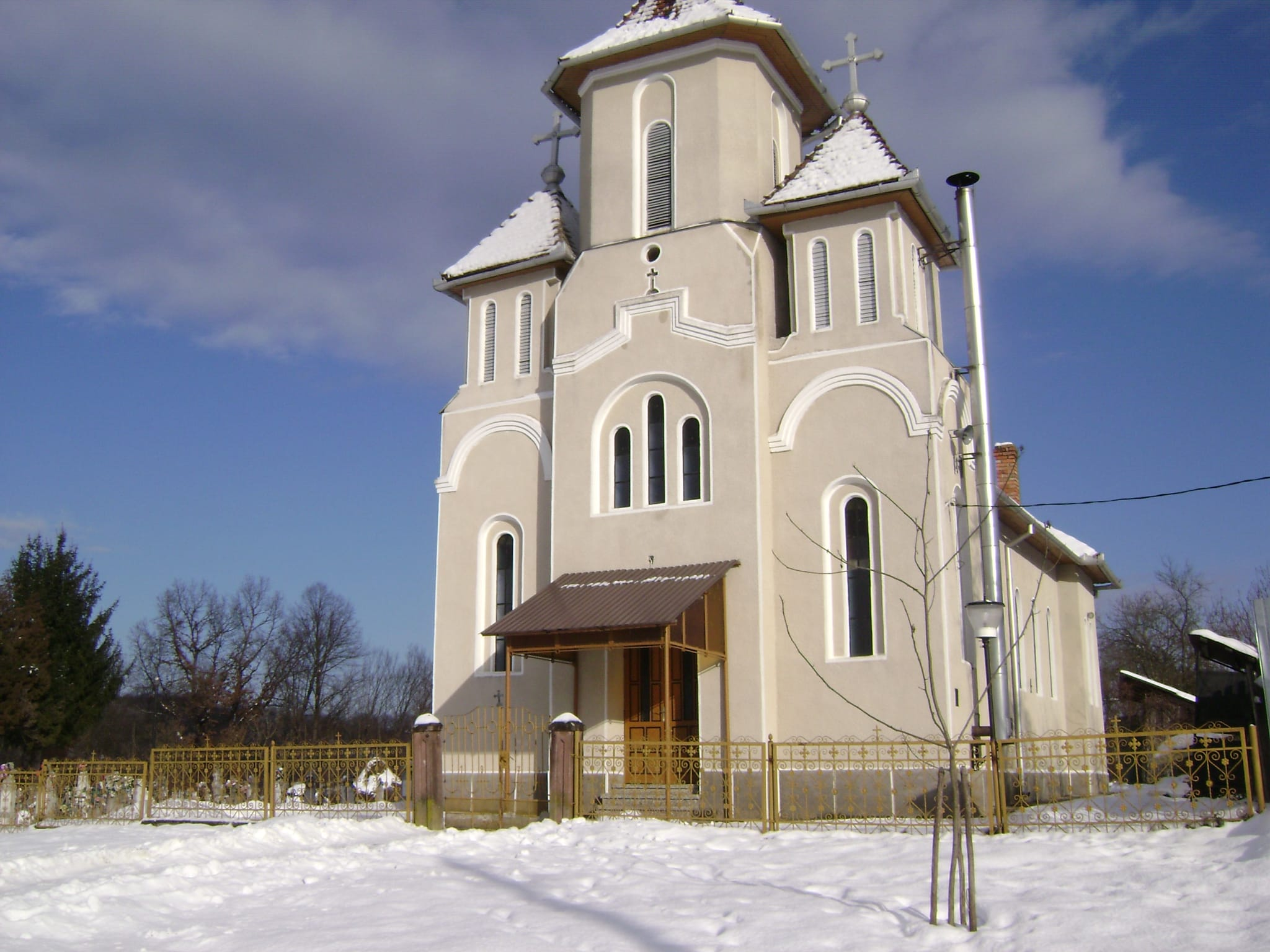
Orthodox church in Drăgșinești

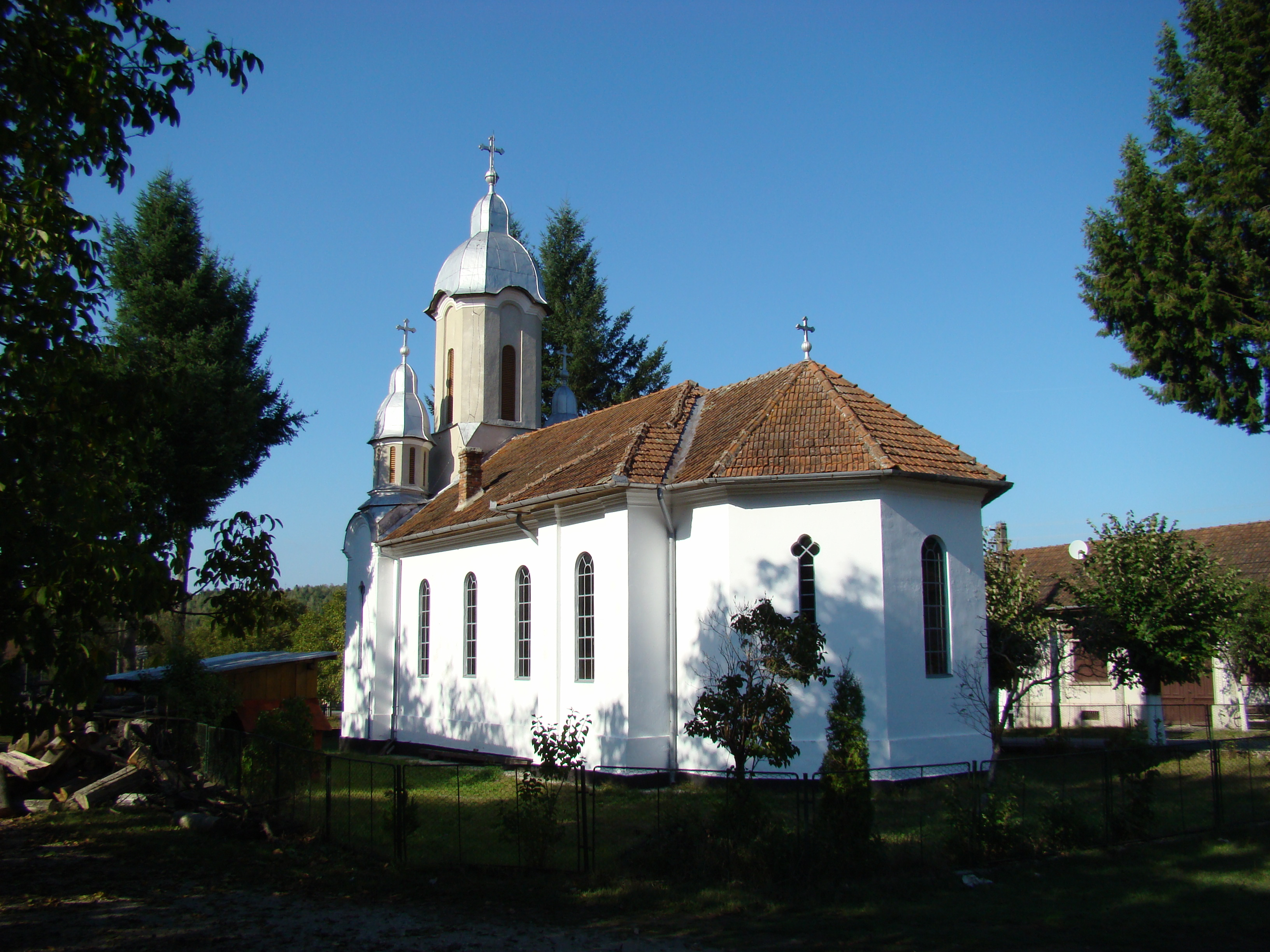
Orthodox church in Gladna Montană

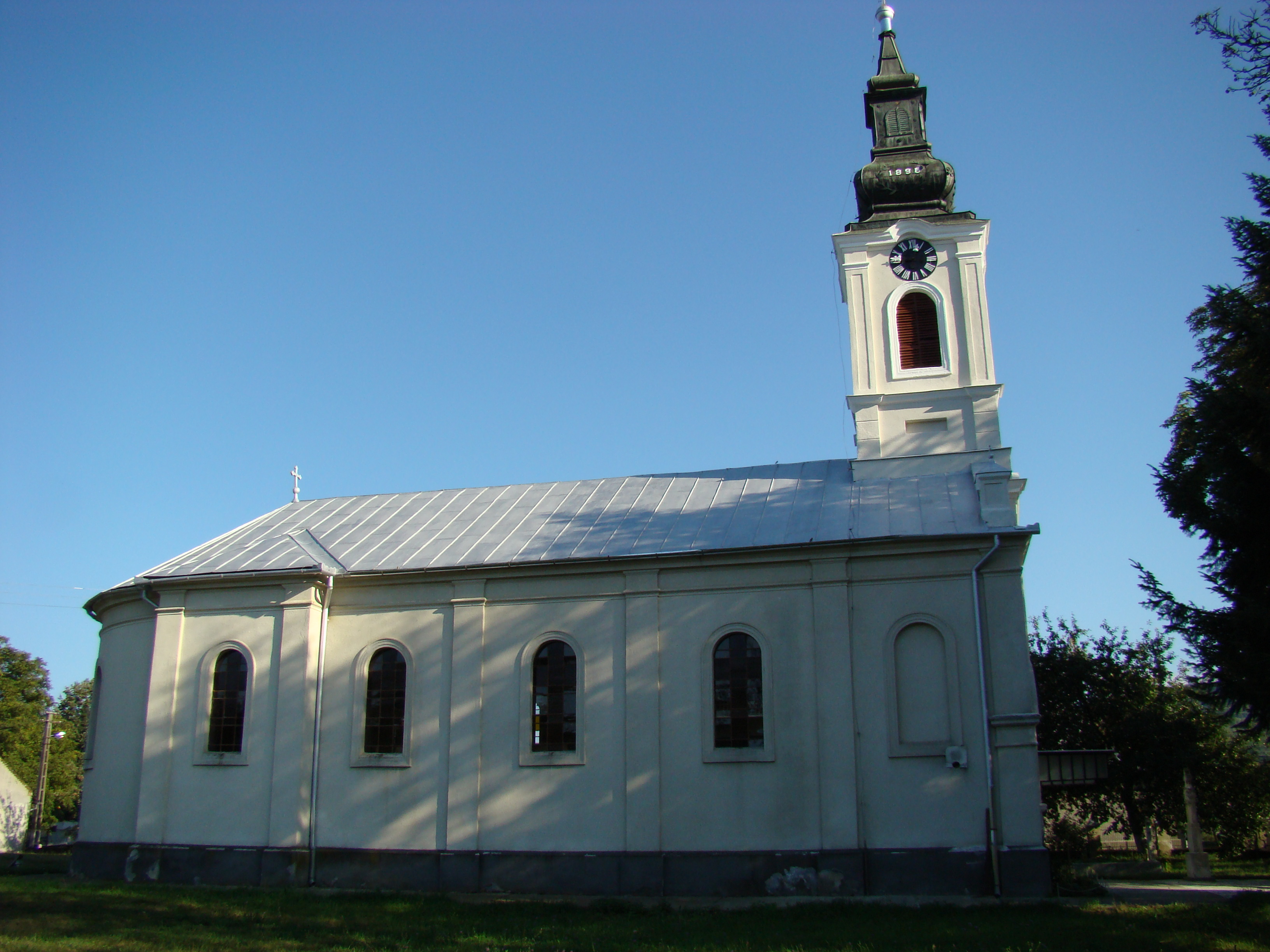
Orthodox church in Gladna Română

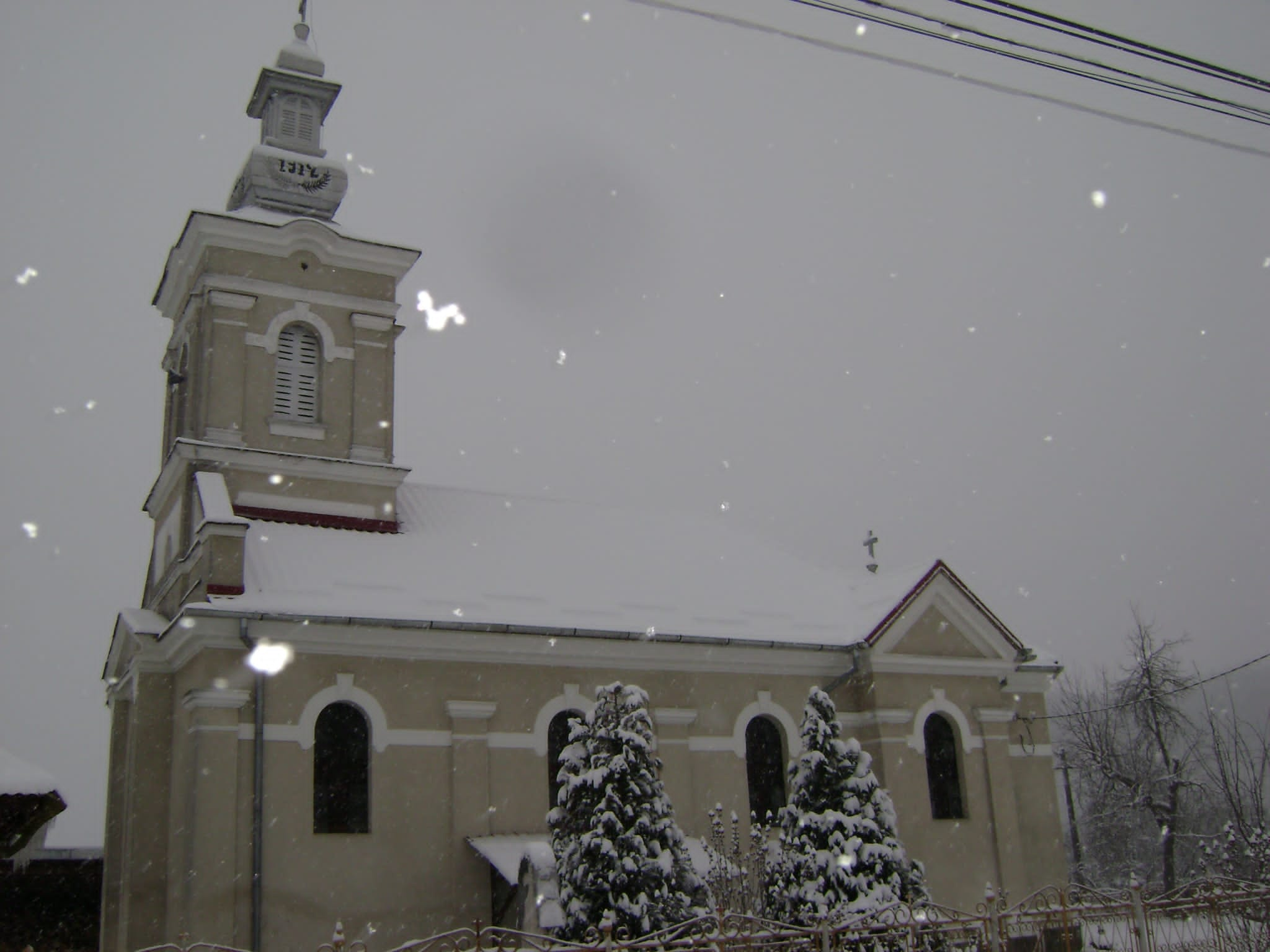
Orthodox church in Mâtnicu Mic

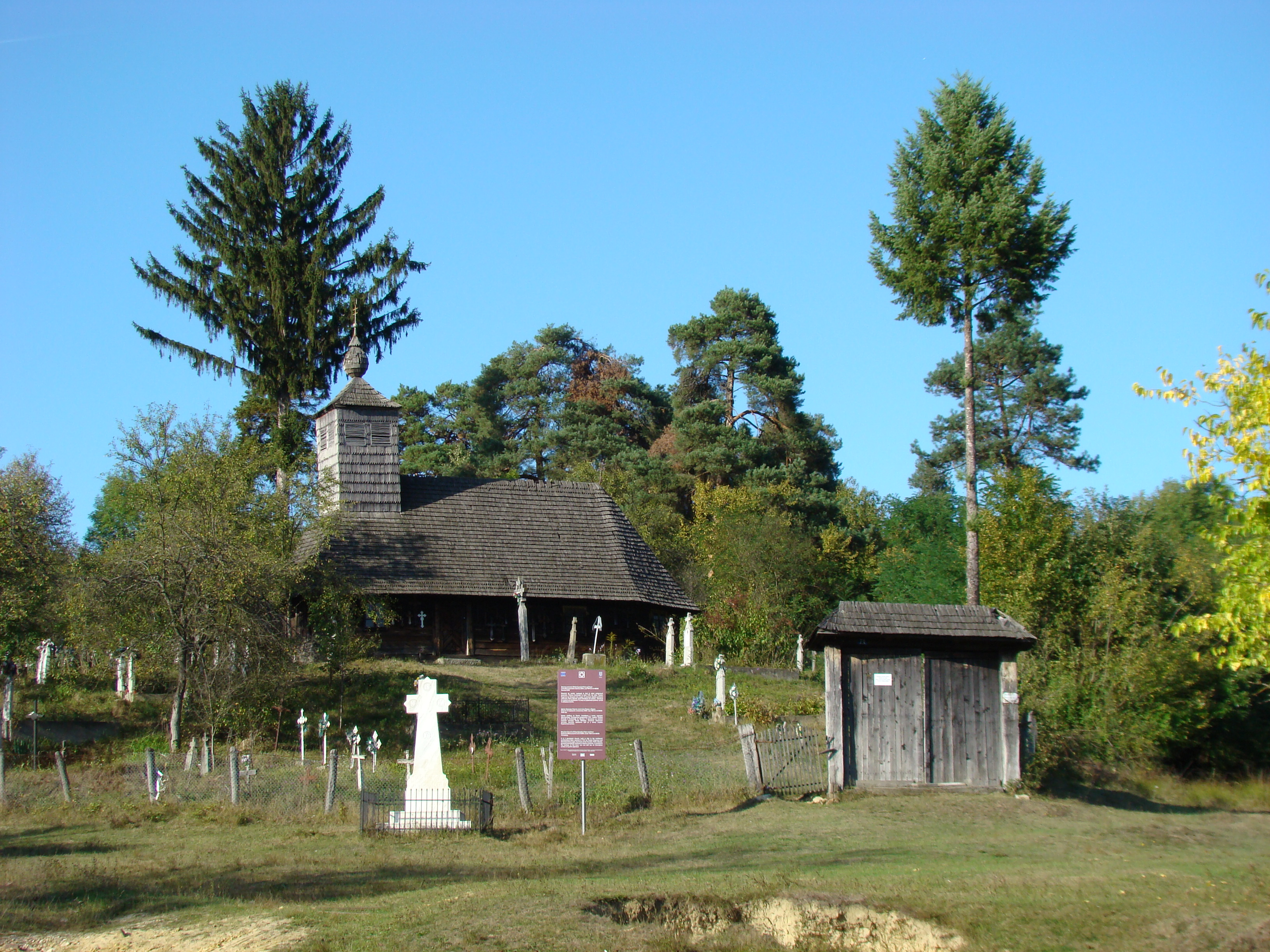
Wooden church in Zolt

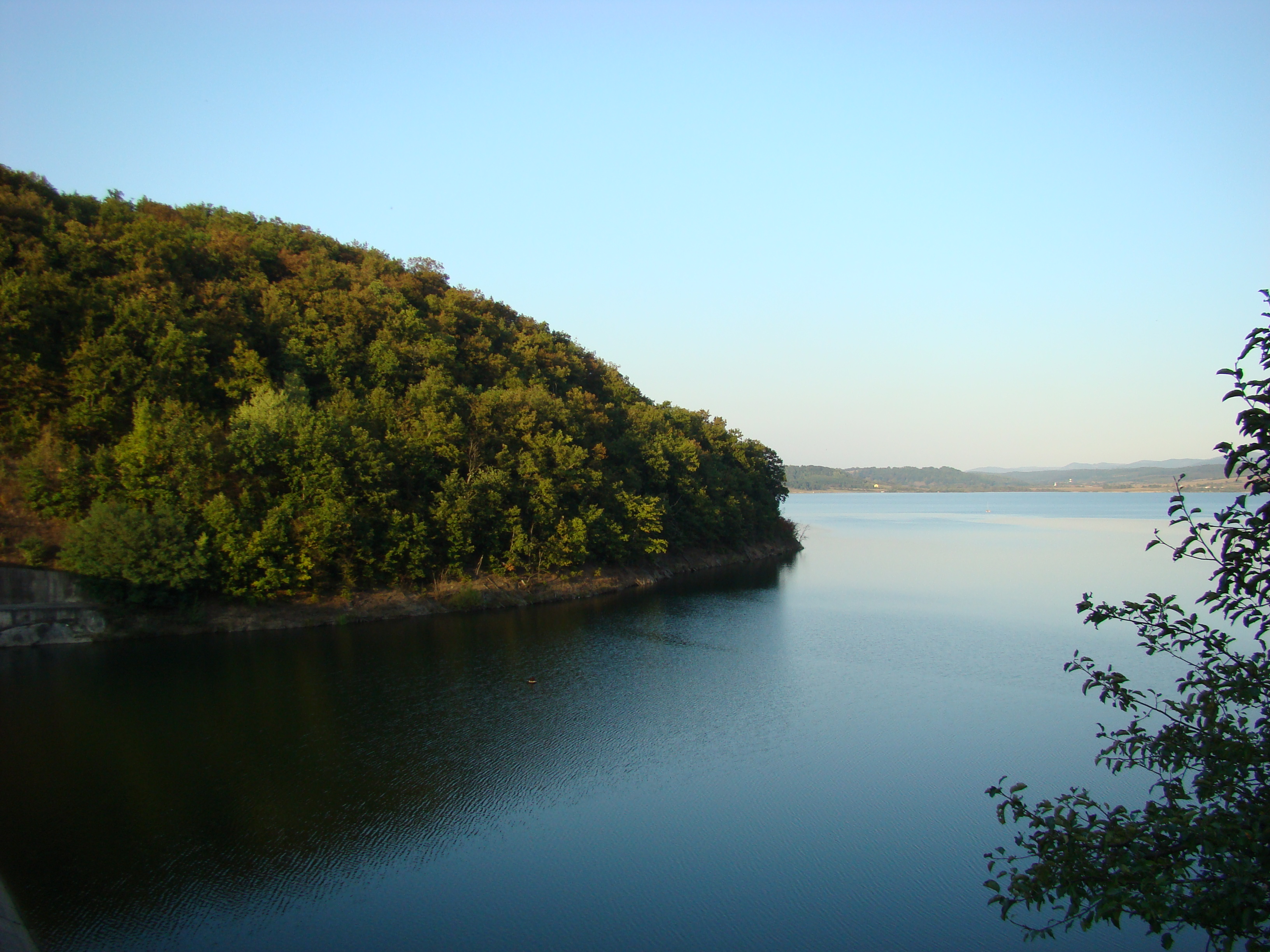
Lake Surduc
