= Dracula family =

Hungarian noble family

The Dracula family (Hungarian: Drakulya) was a Hungarian noble family, attested to in the 16th century, that claimed descent from Vlad the Impaler, who ruled Wallachia as voivode, or prince, on three occasions in the mid-15th century. The claim was made by a member of the family, Ladislas, who described himself as Vlad's grandson in 1543. Modern historians, however, identify him as Vlad's great-grandson, through his son Vlad, a claimant to the Wallachian throne, and the latter's son Louis. The family held the village of Sintești, near the southern frontier of the Kingdom of Hungary, in the early 16th century. By the middle of the century, they had also acquired estates in the easternmost parts of Hungary proper and in eastern Transylvania. The family's coat of arms resembled that of the Báthory family, although no relationship between the two families has been established. Members of the family are chiefly documented as being in the service of more powerful Hungarian lords.

== Origins ==
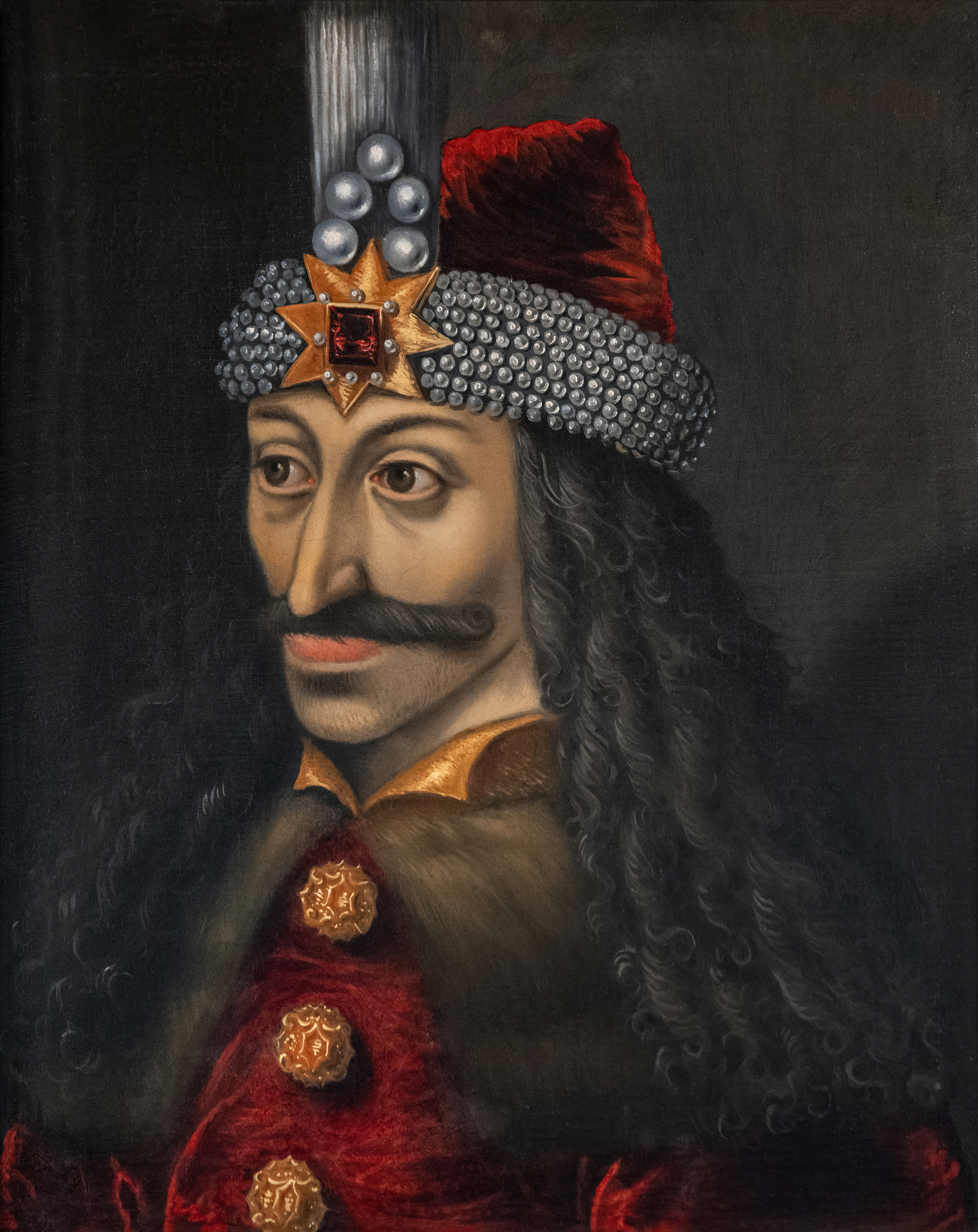
Vlad the Impaler (or Dracula), Prince of Wallachia

In a letter addressed to Nicolaus Olahus, Archbishop of Esztergom in Hungary, dated 11 December 1543, the nobleman Ladislas Dracula stated that he and Olahus were both grandsons of Vlad vaida, sive Dracula ("Voivode Vlad, or Dracula"), who, in the wording of the letter, had been "slaughtered" by the boyars on account of his cruelty. The reference is to Vlad the Impaler, a member of the Drăculești branch of the Basarab dynasty, who ruled Wallachia on three occasions: briefly in 1448, from 1456 to 1462, and again in 1476. He was also known as Dracula, a name derived from the epithet of his father, Vlad Dracul ("Vlad the Dragon"), (Note: Vlad Dracul's epithet derived from his membership in the Order of the Dragon, an order of chivalry established in 1408 by Sigismund of Luxembourg, King of Hungary.) and meaning "son of the Dragon". According to recent scholarship, Vlad married twice; both marriages were to kinswomen of Matthias Corvinus, king of Hungary. Vlad's first wife has been identified by the historian Matei Cazacu as an illegitimate daughter of Corvinus's father, John Hunyadi, while his second wife was Corvinus's maternal cousin, Justina Szilágyi.

Vlad's firstborn but illegitimate son, Mihnea the Bad, lived as a hostage at the Ottoman court during his father's second reign and was serving in Corvinus's retinue in Buda by 1482 or 1483. More than two decades later, he ruled Wallachia from 1508 to 1509. His direct male line became extinct with Alexander the Coccon, who briefly held the Wallachian throne between 1623 and 1627. The name of Vlad's elder legitimate son is unknown, although Cazacu suggests that he was probably named Mircea. He died in 1482 or 1483 while serving John Filipec, Roman Catholic bishop of Oradea, in Hungary.

Vlad's second legitimate son was his namesake, who, like Mihnea, served at Corvinus's court in 1482 or 1483. In 1495, he attempted to seize Wallachia, but his attack was repelled by his cousin Radu the Great. He died sometime after November that year. This Vlad, a son of Vlad the Impaler, or Dracula, is generally regarded by historians as the progenitor of the noble Dracula family, to which the correspondent of Archbishop Nicolaus Olahus belonged.

== Family members ==
=== Louis Dracula ===
Nicholaus Olahus's correspondent, Ladislas, referred to his father as Ludovicus in his Latin letter to the Archbishop. A certain Lodovico Drakwlya de Senthesd ("Louis Dracula of Sintești") is listed among the noblemen who witnessed a document of 1511 confirming the transfer of the castle of Margina, part of a large estate in south-eastern Hungary, to Margrave George of Brandenburg. The village of Sintești, near Margina, which he held in 1511, had been devastated by troops at the beginning of the century and was subsequently depopulated. It lay in a region where several Wallachian boyar families had settled from the fourteenth century onwards. According to the second and last known reference to him, in 1532 Louis was sent from Hunedoara Castle to the Transylvanian Saxon town of Sibiu to negotiate the purchase of salted fish.

Although Ladislas Dracula identified himself in his letter as a grandson of Vlad the Impaler, the historians Paul Binder and Matei Cazacu present Louis, Ladislas's father, as a grandson of Vlad the Impaler through his second legitimate son, Vlad. Binder notes that the Romanian name Vlad would normally have been rendered as Ladislas in Latin documents, whereas the Latin Ludovicus corresponds to the Romanian Laiotă. He therefore suggests that Louis, as a member of the Basarab dynasty, may have been known as Laiotă Basarab. A claimant to the Wallachian throne named Laiotă Basarab was killed at the Battle of Fântâna Țiganului in 1544; Binder, however, states that there "can be no question of identifying this unfortunate claimant", who belonged to the rival Dănești branch of the dynasty, with Louis.

=== Ladislas Dracula ===
The life of Nicolaus Olahus's correspondent is considerably better documented than that of his father. On 20 January 1534 or 1535, he and his brother John received letters patent from Ferdinand I, King of Hungary, in recognition of "the merits of" Ladislas's "ancestors, which were recorded as being neither small nor obscure". The patent confirmed an earlier, now lost, grant of arms depicting a sword superimposed upon three wolf's teeth on a red field. These arms, described as "the ancient insignia of" Ladislas's family, closely resembled those borne by the aristocratic Báthory family. This resemblance led the historians Radu R. Florescu and Raymond T. McNally to suggest the possibility that Vlad the Impaler's son Vlad, Ladislas's purported grandfather, had married into the Báthory family, although they acknowledge that no firm evidence supports the hypothesis. (Note: A marital connection between the family of Vlad the Impaler and the Báthorys had also been proposed by the writer Raymond Rudorff in The Dracula Archive (1972). Rudorff's suggestion appears principally to have served his attempt to associate Elizabeth Báthory, popularly known as the "Blood Countess", with Vlad the Impaler.) The letters patent reveal that they were issued at the intercession of Gáspár Horváth of Vingárt, a Hungarian lord of Croatian origin, in whose retinue Ladislas and his brother served in Hunedoara Castle. On the same day, in a separate charter, King Ferdinand granted to the two brothers the estates forfeited by the nobleman John Szalánczy for treason.

In 1540, Ladislas delivered a letter from Alexis Bethlen, Vice-voivode of Transylvania, to Thomas Nádasdy, Ban of Croatia. Four years later, Ladislas and his brother John, together with three other noblemen—Francis, Andrew, and Paul Thykovith—were granted the village of Faydas in Zaránd County. (Note: The settlement was subsequently abandoned, and its former territory now forms part of the commune of Sintea Mare in Romania.) Binder argues that frequent Ottoman incursions across the southern frontier prompted the brothers to seek estates in areas less exposed to Ottoman raids. Ladislas is first recorded in connection with Marosszék, a district in eastern Transylvania, in 1548. By 1553 or 1554, Ladislas and his wife, Anna Gyulai, held a share of the village of Band in Marosszék. (Note: Binder identified Ladislas’s wife as a member of the Wass de Czege family because the two families held neighbouring estates at Band, but the historian András W. Kovács subsequently showed that this identification was incorrect.) The north-western part of the settlement was subsequently recorded under such names as Drakulia (1651), Drakullya (1794), and Drekula (1856, 1869), which Binder interprets as preserving the memory of the Dracula family.

=== Other members and possible descendants ===
John, the brother of Nicolaus Olahus's correspondent, is mentioned on two occasions: as joint recipient with his brother Ladislas of the letters patent of 1534/1535 and of the land grant of 1544. Another John, recorded as Ioannes Drakulye, was mentioned as a nobleman at Band in 1586. Binder identifies him as a son of Ladislas and as the last known male descendant of the family. A certain George Dracula, recorded as Georgius Drakulya, fought for Gáspár Bekes, a claimant to the Transylvanian throne, against Stephen Báthory at the Battle of Sanpaul on 9 July 1575. Binder considers him to have been either a son or a grandson of one of the brothers, Ladislas or John.

In 1617, the nobleman Stephen Géczy was referred to as Drakulya in a document recording his exchange with Simon Péchi, Chancellor of Transylvania, of part of the Band estate for lands at Grebenișu de Câmpie. In 1632, Géczy became a priest at Sucutard and administrator of the Wass family estates at Țaga. A document issued in 1637 described him as a "man of substance". Binder identifies him as a certain Stephen Géczy-Papp, who served as the "master" of the Hospital of the Poor at Eliseni and was represented in a lawsuit in 1631 by his wife, "the noble lady Anna Papp". According to Binder, Géczy married a daughter of John Dracula, the nobleman of Band. Their son, Paul Géczy-Papp, is recorded as a clerk in 1650 and married to the Romanian noblewoman Susane Krainik. Some individuals in Transylvania bearing the surnames Géczy or Papp claim descent from Vlad the Impaler, although these claims are not supported by documentary evidence.

== Family tree ==
Dracula family
(The family tree shows George as the son of Ladislas, and Anne, the wife of Stephen Géczy-Papp, as Ladislas's granddaughter.)

Vlad the Impaler † 1476; Voivode of Wallachia (r. 1448, 1456–1462, 1476)
Vlad † 1495; Wallachian pretender
Louis Dracula of Sintești † 1532/35
Ladislas Dracula of Sintești ∞Anna Gyulai	John Dracula of Sintești
John Dracula	George Dracula
Anne ∞Stephen Géczy-Papp, alias Dracula
Paul Géczy-Papp

== Sources ==
- Binder, Paul (1988). "Une famille noble roumaine de Transilvanie: Les Dracula de Sintești" [A Romanian Noble Family of Transylvania: The Dracula of Sintești]. Revue Roumaine d'Histoire (in French). XXVII (4). Editura Academiei Republicii Socialiste România: 301–314. ISSN 0556-8072.
- Cazacu, Matei (2017). Dracula. BRILL. ISBN 978-90-04-34725-0.
- Florescu, Radu R.; McNally, Raymond T. (1989). Dracula, Prince of Many Faces: His Life and his Times. Back Bay Books. ISBN 978-0-316-28656-5.
- Nagy, Levente; Szilágyi, Emőke Rita (2022). "Câteva date noi despre genealogia familiilor Olahus, Hunyadi și Dracula (Vlad Țepeș)" [Some New Data on the Genealogy of the Olahus, Hunyadi and Dracula (Vlad Țepeș) Families] (PDF). Studii și Materiale de Istorie Medie (in Romanian). LX. Academia Română, Institutul de Istorie Nicolae Iorga: 125–164. ISSN 1222-4766.
- W. Kovács, András (2004). "A cegei Wass család története (16–20. század)" [The History of the Family Wass de Cege in the 16th–20th Centuries] (PDF). Erdélyi Múzeum (in Hungarian). LXVI (3–4). Erdélyi Múzeum-Egyesület: 1–56. ISSN 1453-0961.
