= Vlad (son of Dracula) =

Son of Vlad the Impaler (died 1495)

Vlad (died 1495) was a son of Vlad the Impaler, Voivode of Wallachia, and an unsuccessful claimant to the Wallachian throne in 1495. His mother was a kinswoman of Matthias Corvinus, King of Hungary. Vlad and his elder illegitimate brother, Mihnea, were brought up at the royal court in Buda and later accompanied Corvinus on his campaigns in Austria during the late 1480s. Under Corvinus's successor, Vladislaus II Jagiellon, Vlad settled in Transylvania. In 1495 he made an unauthorized attempt to seize the Wallachian throne from his cousin, Radu the Great, but was defeated and died shortly afterwards in Hungary.

== Early life ==
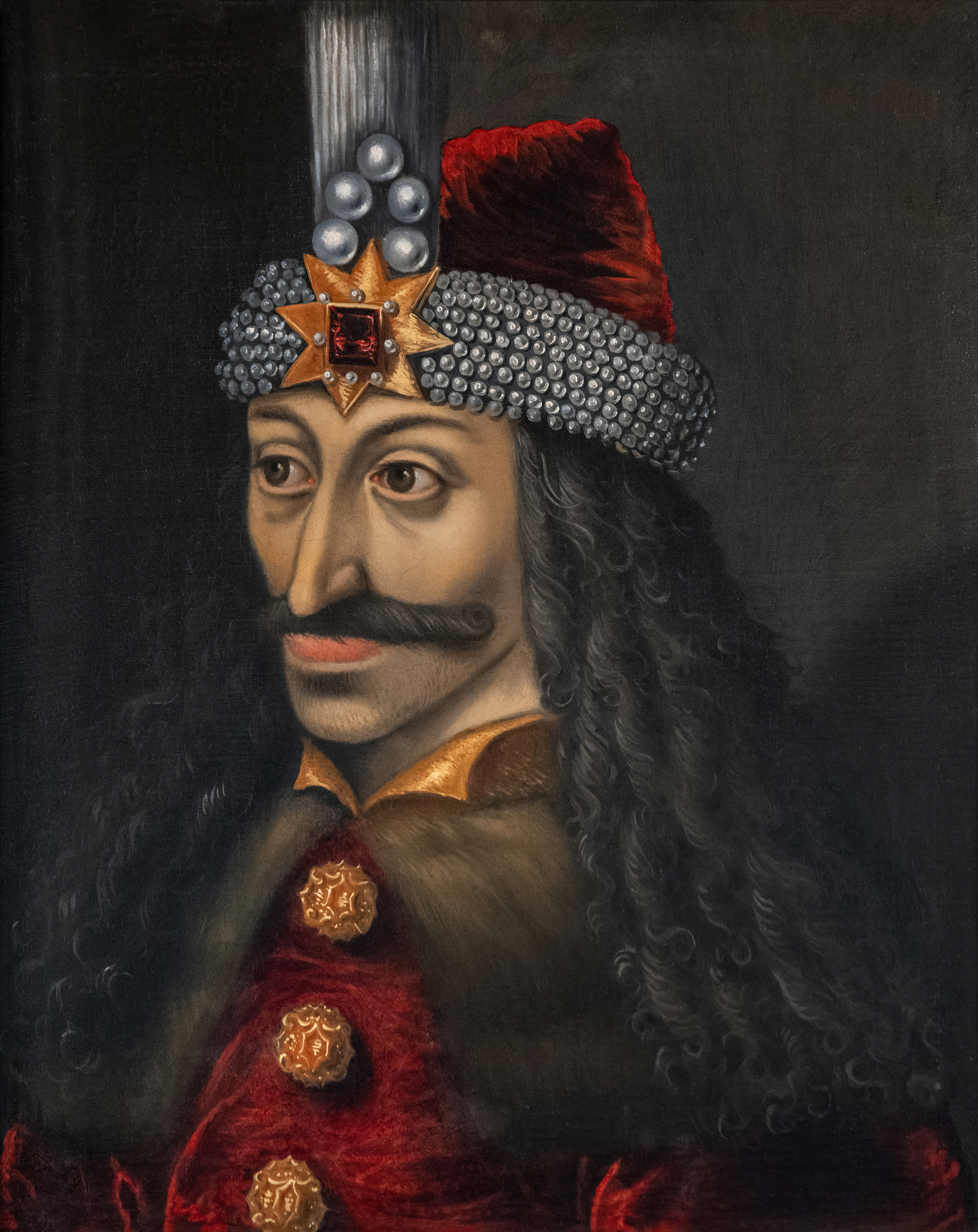
Vlad the Impaler (or Dracula), Prince of Wallachia

Vlad was one of the two legitimate sons of Vlad the Impaler, who ruled Wallachia on three occasions: briefly in 1448, from 1456 to 1462, and again in 1476. Also known as Dracula, Vlad the Impaler was a member of the Drăculești branch of the Basarab dynasty. Modern historians generally hold that Vlad the Impaler married twice, in both cases to women related to Matthias Corvinus, king of Hungary from 1458 to 1490. His first wife has been variously identified as an illegitimate half-sister of Corvinus—that is, an illegitimate daughter of John Hunyadi, governor of Hungary; as a sister of Hunyadi; or as Ilona Szilágyi, a maternal cousin of Corvinus. (Note: Vlad the Impaler's unnamed first wife was referred to as one of Corvinus's "female relatives" in a report dated 4 March 1462 by Pietro Tommaso, the Venetian envoy at Corvinus's royal court in Buda.) His second wife was Justina Szilágyi, also a maternal cousin of Corvinus. (Note: Justina was identified as the widow of Dragwlya waywode ("Voivode Dracula") in a deed dated 10 September 1489 concerning the sale of a house in Pécs, known as Drakwlyahaza ("Dracula's House"), which had formerly been in her possession.) The historians Matei Cazacu and Mihai Florin Hasan identify Justina Szilágyi as Vlad's mother; Tamás Fedeles and Alexandru Simon, however, maintains that Vlad the Impaler's second marriage was childless.

Vlad the Impaler fathered three sons. His eldest, Mihnea, was born out of wedlock, while the other two were legitimate. The historians Radu R. Florescu and Raymond T. McNally regard Vlad as the elder of the two legitimate sons, whereas Cazacu and Simon identify him as the younger. His only legitimate brother is not named in contemporary sources, although Cazacu and Simon tentatively identify him as Mircea. He died childless in 1482 or 1483 while serving John Filipec, Roman Catholic bishop of Oradea, in Hungary.

The younger Vlad resided at the royal court in Buda with his illegitimate brother Mihnea, and both served in the royal retinue. They accompanied Corvinus on his campaigns against Frederick III, Holy Roman Emperor, and took part in the capture of Vienna in 1485 and Wiener Neustadt in 1487. After Corvinus's death in 1490, Vladislaus II Jagiellon succeeded him as king of Hungary. According to Cazacu, Mihnea and Vlad subsequently settled in the Transylvanian Saxon town of Sibiu, where their father had built a house shortly before his death. King Vladislaus subsequently installed Vlad in southern Transylvania, with the purpose of securing the region against Ottoman raids.

== Succession attempt ==
Vlad the Monk, an illegitimate brother of Vlad the Impaler, ruled Wallachia from 1482 until his death in September 1495. Upon receiving news of his uncle's death, Vlad mustered troops and entered Wallachia in an attempt to assert his claim to the principality. The enterprise proved unsuccessful, and his forces were shortly defeated by his cousin Radu the Great, Vlad the Monk's son. As the campaign had been undertaken without royal authorization, King Vladislaus reprimanded Vlad and, in November 1495, ordered his immediate return to Hungary. According to Cazacu, Vlad died shortly afterwards.

== Family ==
Cazacu has suggested that Vlad probably married a Hungarian noblewoman, perhaps of Transylvanian origin. A letter dated 2 December 1543, addressed to Nicolaus Olahus, Archbishop of Esztergom, records the nobleman Ladislas Dracula as stating that he and Olahus were both grandsons of Wlaad waÿda, sive Dracula ("Voivode Vlad, or Dracula"). A number of historians, including Paul Binder, Cazacu, and Florescu, have identified Ladislas as a son or grandson of Vlad, the claimant to the Wallachian throne. The descendants of Ladislas, members of the noble Dracula family, possessed the village of Sintești in south-eastern Hungary and later held estates in the easternmost part of Transylvania.

== Sources ==
- Binder, Paul (1988). "Une famille noble roumaine de Transilvanie: Les Dracula de Sintești" [A Romanian Noble Family of Transylvania: The Dracula of Sintești]. Revue Roumaine d'Histoire (in French). XXVII (4). Editura Academiei Republicii Socialise România: 301–314. ISSN 0556-8072.
- Cazacu, Matei (2017). Dracula. BRILL. ISBN 978-90-04-34725-0.
- Fedeles, Tamás (2010). "Drakwlyahaza" [House of Drakwlya]. In Almási, Tibor; Révész, Éva; Szabados, György (eds.). "Fons, skepsis, lex": Ünnepi tanulmányok a 70 esztendős Makk Ferenc tiszteletére ["Fons, skepsis, lex": Studies in Honor of the 70-year-old Ferenc Makk] (in Hungarian). Szegedi Középkorász Műhely. pp. 107–114. ISBN 978-963-30-6073-5.
- Florescu, Radu R.; McNally, Raymond T. (1989). Dracula, Prince of Many Faces: His Life and his Times. Back Bay Books. ISBN 978-0-316-28656-5.
- Hasan, Mihai Florin (2013). "Aspecte ale relaţiilor matrimoniale munteano-maghiare din secolele XIV-XV" [Aspects of the Hungarian-Wallachian Matrimonial Relations of the Fourteenth and Fifteenth centuries]. Revista Bistriţei (in Romanian). XXVII. Cumplexul Muzeal Bistrița-Năsăud: 128–159. ISSN 1222-5096.
- Nagy, Levente; Szilágyi, Emőke Rita (2023). "Hollókőtől Esztergomig: Új adatok az Oláh, a Hunyadi és a Drakula család genealógiájához" [From Hollókő to Esztergom: New Data on the Genealogy of the Oláh, Hunyadi and Dracula Families] (PDF). Történelmi Szemle (in Hungarian). LXV (4). Bölcsészettudományi Kutatóközpont, Történettudományi Intézet: 639–667. ISSN 0040-9634.
- Simon, Alexandru (2011). "Propaganda and Matrimony: Dracula between Hunyadi and Habsburg" (PDF). Transylvanian Review. XV (4). Romanian Academy, Center for Transylvanian Studies: 80–90. ISSN 1221-1249.
