= Șerbeni =

- Location within Romania

Location
- Country: Romania
- Counties: Timiș County
- Villages: Povârgina, Răchita

Physical characteristics
- Mouth: Bunea
  - location: near Răchita
  - coordinates: 45.8437°N 22.0828°E
- Length: 14 km (8.7 mi)
- Basin size: 34 km^{2} (13 sq mi)

Basin features
- Progression: Bunea→ Bega→ Tisza→ Danube→ Black Sea

The Șerbeni is a left tributary of the river Bunea in Romania. It flows into the Bunea near Răchita. Its length is 14 km (8.7 mi) and its basin size is 34 km^{2} (13 sq mi).
