= Bătești Daffodil Meadow =

Protected area in Romania

- IUCN category IV (habitat/species management area)
- Location within Romania
- Location: Bătești (Făget), Timiș County, Romania
- Coordinates: 45°51′18″N 22°13′43″E
- Area: 20 ha (49 acres)
- Established: 1995, 2000

The Bătești Daffodil Meadow is a nationally protected area, classified as an IUCN Category IV botanical nature reserve, located in Timiș County, within the administrative boundaries of the town of Făget.

The area faces significant threats due to the absence of a formal management plan, which has resulted in uncontrolled practices such as the burning of vegetation to clear plant debris and unrestricted grazing by cattle and sheep.

== Location ==
The 20-hectare natural area is situated in the northeastern corner of Timiș County, north of the village of Bătești, on the right side of the national road (DN68A) that links the town of Făget with the village of Margina.

== Description ==
The nature reserve was designated as a protected area by Law No. 5 of March 6, 2000, and consists of meadows situated at the interface between the Lugoj Plain and the Lugoj Hills. Half of the 20 hectares covered with daffodils are state-owned, while the remaining area belongs to local residents of Bătești and Făget.

The natural area serves as a protected habitat for a large population of daffodils (Narcissus poeticus ssp. stellaris), which coexist with specimens of Iris sibirica.

== Legend ==
According to a local legend that seeks to explain the sudden emergence of daffodils in this region, a battle with the Turks resulted in the loss of many lives, and for each soul lost, a daffodil is said to have appeared. The legend further attributes unique properties to these flowers: if picked or torn in an attempt to take them home, they wither within 24 hours; similarly, if their bulbs are removed and planted elsewhere, they fail to grow.
