= Bunea =

Bunea may refer to:

== Persons ==
- Gheorghe Bunea Stancu (born 1954), Romanian politician
- Florentina Bunea (born 1966), Romanian statistician

== Places ==
- Bunea Mare, a village in the commune Făget, Timiș County, Romania
- Bunea Mică, a village in the commune Făget, Timiș County, Romania
- Bunea (river), a tributary of the river Bega in Timiș County, Romania
