= Bunea (river) =

- Location within Romania

Location
- Country: Romania
- Counties: Timiș County
- Villages: Bunea Mare

Physical characteristics
- Mouth: Bega
  - location: Mănăștiur
  - coordinates: 45.8336°N 22.0285°E
- Length: 16 km (9.9 mi)
- Basin size: 117 km^{2} (45 sq mi)

Basin features
- Progression: Bega→ Tisza→ Danube→ Black Sea
- Tributaries
  - left: Șerbeni
  - right: Pădurani, Topla

The Bunea is a right tributary of the river Bega in Romania. It discharges into the Bega near Mănăștiur. Its length is 16 km (9.9 mi) and its basin size is 117 km^{2} (45 sq mi).
