= Pădurani =

- Location within Romania

Location
- Country: Romania
- Counties: Timiș County
- Villages: Pădurani

Physical characteristics
- Mouth: Bunea
  - coordinates: 45.8627°N 22.0793°E
- Length: 11 km (6.8 mi)
- Basin size: 23 km^{2} (8.9 sq mi)

Basin features
- Progression: Bunea→ Bega→ Tisza→ Danube→ Black Sea

The Pădurani is a right tributary of the river Bunea in Romania. It flows into the Bunea near the village Pădurani. Its length is 11 km (6.8 mi) and its basin size is 23 km^{2} (8.9 sq mi).
