= Topla (river) =

- Location within Romania

Location
- Country: Romania
- Counties: Timiș County
- Villages: Dubești, Topla, Remetea-Luncă

Physical characteristics
- Mouth: Bunea
  - location: Remetea-Luncă
  - coordinates: 45.8391°N 22.0478°E
- Length: 14 km (8.7 mi)
- Basin size: 26 km^{2} (10 sq mi)

Basin features
- Progression: Bunea→ Bega→ Tisza→ Danube→ Black Sea

The Topla is a right tributary of the river Bunea in Romania. It flows into the Bunea near Remetea-Luncă. Its length is 14 km (8.7 mi) and its basin size is 26 km^{2} (10 sq mi).
