= Dumbrava, Timiș =

Dumbrava
- Commune
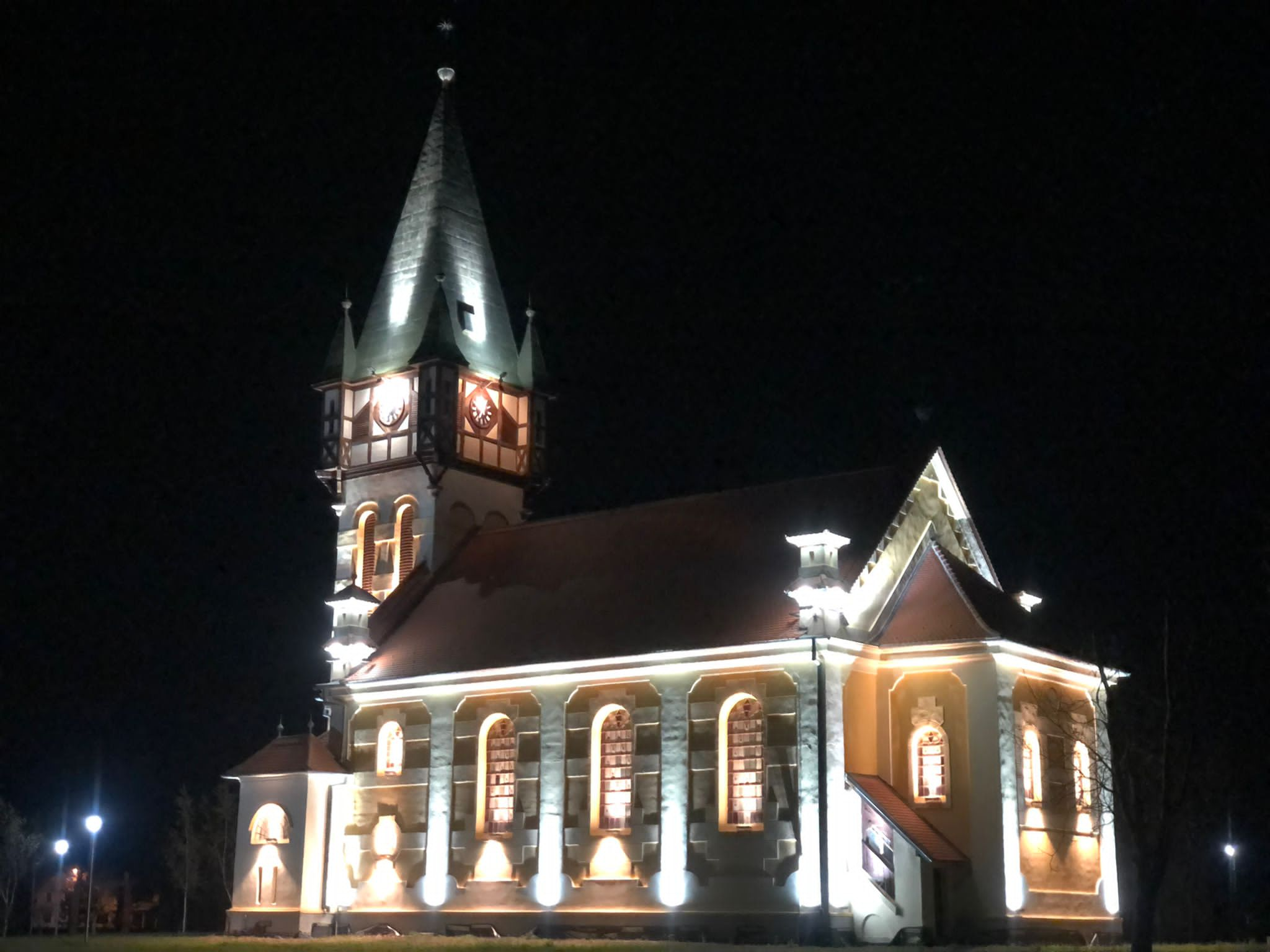
- The Reformed church in Dumbrava

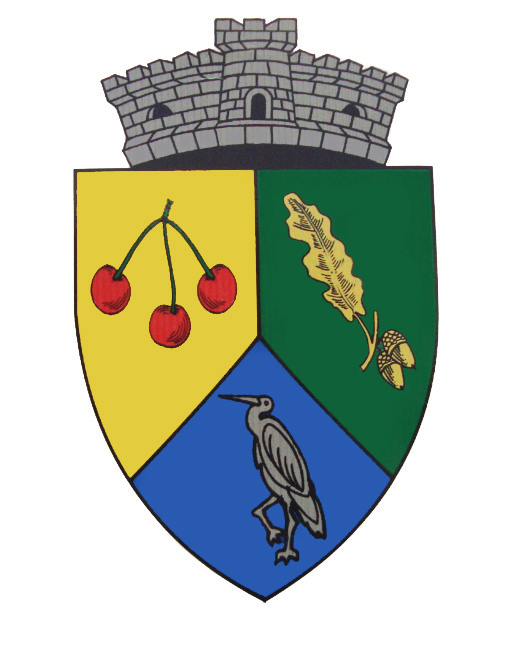
- Coat of arms

- Location in Timiș County

- Location in Romania
- Coordinates: 45.8236°N 22.1175°E
- Country: Romania
- County: Timiș

Government
  - Mayor (2024–): Cristian Olariu (PNL)
- Area: 56.67 km^{2} (21.88 sq mi)
- Population (2021-12-01): 2,512
  - Density: 44.33/km^{2} (114.8/sq mi)
- Time zone: UTC+02:00 (EET)
  - Summer (DST): UTC+03:00 (EEST)
- Postal code: 307155–307157
- Vehicle reg.: TM
- Website: www.primariadumbrava.ro

Dumbrava (Hungarian: Igazfalva; German: Treudorf) is a commune in Timiș County, Romania. It is composed of three villages: Bucovăț, Dumbrava (commune seat) and Răchita. It is located in the east of Timiș County and borders Făget to the northeast, Fârdea to the southeast, Traian Vuia to the southwest and Mănăștiur to the northwest.

== History ==
Dumbrava was established in 1893 by colonizing with Reformed Hungarians from Vésztő, Makó, Köröstarcsa and Gyoma. However, its name is older and comes from a former settlement, on the hearth of which the present-day locality was built. It was called Igazfalva by Hungarians since the Middle Ages. By 1453 there were two small settlements: Alsóigazfalva ("Lower Igazfalva") and Felsőigazfalva ("Upper Igazfalva"); the names seem to have been imposed by the Hungarian nobles, for there were no Hungarians living in the two villages. The two merged by 1464. The Hungarian colony was designed on the forests belonging to the state treasury. The perpendicular streets and houses made of raft typical of the Pannonian Steppe are still preserved today.

The first recorded mention of Bucovăț dates from 1440, when it belonged to the Șoimoș Fortress. By 1514 there were two settlements: Bucovățul de Jos ("Lower Bucovăț") and Bucovățul de Sus ("Upper Bucovăț"), but in 1596 there was only one name for both. It belonged to Krassó-Szörény County, having always been inhabited by Romanians. They built their Orthodox church in 1780.

Răchita was first mentioned in 1393. The village is also mentioned in Marsigli's notes from 1690–1700. At the 1717 census it had 30 houses. In the interwar period it belonged to Plasa Făget, Severin County.

== Demographics ==
Ethnic composition (2021)
1. Romanians (77.1%)
2. Hungarians (16.6%)
3. Unknown (5.53%)
4. Others (0.77%)
Religious composition (2021)
1. Orthodox (63.6%)
2. Reformed (13.8%)
3. Pentecostals (8.95%)
4. Baptists (3.18%)
5. Jehovah's Witnesses (2.78%)
6. Unknown (5.65%)
7. Others (1.83%)
8. Irreligious, atheists and agnostics (0.15%)

Dumbrava had a population of 2,512 inhabitants at the 2021 census, down 5.53% from the 2011 census. Most inhabitants are Romanians (77.1%), with a minority of Hungarians (16.6%). For 5.53% of the population, ethnicity is unknown. By religion, most inhabitants are Orthodox (63.61%), but there are also minorities of Reformed (13.85%), Pentecostals (8.95%), Baptists (3.18%) and Jehovah's Witnesses (2.78%). For 5.65% of the population, religious affiliation is unknown.

Census		Ethnic composition
Year	Population	Romanians	Hungarians
1880	1,995	1,953	7
1890	2,183	2,150	3
1900	4,223	2,295	1,813
1910	4,413	2,393	1,934
1920	4,005	2,282	1,688
1930	3,870	2,387	1,458
1941	3,763	2,412	1,306
1956	3,400	2,293	1,088
1966	3,224	2,261	950
1977	2,993	2,183	800
1992	2,799	2,155	615
2002	2,797	2,244	530
2011	2,659	2,088	471
2021	2,512	1,937	417

== Politics and administration ==
The commune of Dumbrava is administered by a mayor and a local council composed of 11 councilors. The mayor, Cristian Olariu, from the National Liberal Party, has been in office since 2024. As from the 2024 local elections, the local council has the following composition by political parties:

Party	Seats	Composition
Social Democratic Party	4	
National Liberal Party	3	
Democratic Alliance of Hungarians in Romania	2	
Alliance for the Union of Romanians	1	
Save Romania Union–People's Movement Party–Force of the Right	1	
