= Radu Florescu =

Romanian historian (1925–2014)

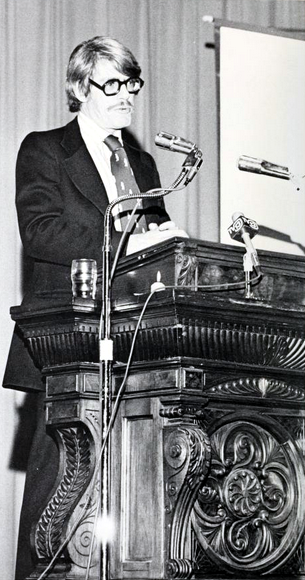
- Florescu at Clemson University in 1977
- Born: 23 October 1925; Bucharest, Kingdom of Romania
- Died: 18 May 2014 (aged 88); Mougins, France
- Education: Christ Church (BA & MA); Indiana University Bloomington (PhD)
- Occupations: Historian, Professor
- Spouse: Nicole Michel
- Children: 4
- Parent(s): Radu Florescu, Vera Soepkez

Radu Florescu (23 October 1925 – 18 May 2014) was a Romanian academic who held the position of emeritus professor of history at Boston College. His work on Vlad Dracula includes a series of bestselling books that he co-authored with his colleague Raymond T. McNally. Along with serving as director of the East European Research Center at Boston College, Florescu was also a philanthropist and an adviser to Edward Kennedy on Balkan and Eastern European affairs. At the time of his death, Radu Florescu was considered the patriarch of the Florescu family.

== Life ==
=== Escape from Romania ===
Florescu was born in Bucharest to an aristocratic Florescu family, one of the oldest of the extant Romanian Boyar families. He left Romania at the outbreak of World War II and moved to London, as his father, a pro-Allied diplomat who served under Romanian minister Viorel Tilea to the United Kingdom, defied a recall order from the pro-Axis government of Ion Antonescu. In protest of Romania's new alliance with Nazi Germany, Florescu's father resigned his post and joined the Free Rumanian Committee in opposition to the fascist Antonescu regime. After leaving St. Edward's School, Oxford, Florescu received a scholarship to study history (BA, MA) at Christ Church, Oxford. He moved to Indiana University Bloomington in the United States for his doctorate.

=== Boston during the Cold War ===
With one child, Nicholas, born in Austin, Texas, Radu Florescu moved east and began his academic career as a professor of history at Boston College. In the Boston area, he will have 3 more children: John (1954), Radu (1961), and Alexandra (1963). At Boston College, he joined forces with Raymond T. McNally, and the two began their research on Vlad the Impaler. Then with McNally and Matei Cazacu, of the Paris Institut des Hautes Etudes, Florescu will go on to write six books on Vlad the Impaler's life. Alongside his work on Vlad the Impaler, Florescu would write seven more books on East European History and on the history of Romania such as The Struggle Against Russia in the Romanian principalities, 1821–1854.

Radu Florescu created a diplomatic bridge between the United States and Romania. He advised Edward Kennedy on matters of the Balkans, and also served as the press liaison for the White House during the state visit of President Richard Nixon in 1969 in Romania.

In 1986, Florescu became the director of the East European Research Center at Boston College and remained in that position until his retirement in 2008. In that function, he organized symposiums on themes varying from the diffusion of Thracian culture in antiquity to the rise of antisemitism in interwar Romania.

=== Post-revolution Romania ===
From 1996 to 2004, Florescu served as Honorary Consul for New England by the Romanian Foreign Ministry, the first person to hold such a position in the United States. His first job as honorary consul was to oversee voting by Boston-area Romanian citizens in one of the first democratic Romanian elections since the Revolution of 1989. After the Revolution of 1989, he also organized visits of Romanian presidents, and members of the Romanian Royal House to Harvard University, The John F. Kennedy library and Boston City Hall. He was Emeritus Honorary Consul. In his retirement from France and Poiana Brașov, Florescu repurposed the East European Research Centre to create an annual scholarship for several gifted Romanian teenagers to study in the Boston area during summer months. These scholarships still continue to this day. His son, John M. Florescu, serves on the board of Educational Enrichment for Romanian Children.

Florescu died on May 18, 2014, in Mougins, France from complications of pneumonia. Upon his death, the Romanian royal family released a statement of condolences and recognition for Florescu's work.

== Dracula research ==
In his bestseller In Search of Dracula (1972), co-authored with Raymond T. McNally, he claimed that the brutal Vlad III, voivod of the principality of Wallachia, was the inspiration for Bram Stoker's Dracula. Vlad was a member of the House of Drăculești, and Stoker's novel took place in real locations such as Transylvania and Tihuța Pass, including even correct rail lines. For this reason, Florescu concluded that the main character must also be inspired by facts. Vlad Țepeș, known for the slaughter of many Saxons and Ottomans, with a penchant for impaling his enemies on stakes, was the logical choice as the model for Dracula. The book was translated into 15 languages and boosted the Romanian tourism industry as young Westerners flocked to Romania to trace the footsteps of the historical Dracula.

== Other research ==
Florescu also wrote about literary creations like Frankenstein with In Search of Frankenstein (1975) and the Pied Piper of Hamelin with In Search of the Pied Piper (2005). In the former, Florescu advocated the theory that the German theologian, alchemist, anatomist, and physician Johann Konrad Dippel was the inspiration for Mary Shelley's novel Frankenstein. Florescu's last book, also written with McNally, investigated the possible true identity of the person on whom Robert Louis Stevenson may have based Strange Case of Dr Jekyll and Mr Hyde.

== Books ==
- Florescu, Radu (2005). In Search of the Pied Piper. Athena Press. ISBN 1-84401-339-1.
- Florescu, Radu; McNally, Raymond T. (1994). In search of Dracula: the history of Dracula and vampires. Houghton Mifflin Co. ISBN 0-395-65783-0.
- McNally, Raymond T.; Florescu, Radu (1992). The complete Dracula. Acton, Mass: Copley Pub. Group. ISBN 0-87411-595-7.
- McNally, Raymond T.; Florescu, Radu (1989). Dracula, prince of many faces: his life and his times. Boston: Little, Brown. ISBN 0-316-28656-7. 2009 eBook edition
- In Search of Frankenstein: Exploring the Myths Behind Mary Shelley's Monster. Boston, Massachusetts: Little, Brown and Company. 1996 [1975]. ISBN 978-1-861-05033-5.
- McNally, Raymond T.; Florescu, Radu (2000). In Search of Dr. Jekyll and Mr. Hyde. St. Martin's Press. ISBN 9781580631570.
