= Raymond T. McNally =

American historian and writer (1931–2002)

Raymond Thomas McNally (April 15, 1931 – October 2, 2002) was an American author and a professor of Russian and East European History at Boston College. He specialized in the history of horror and wrote many books on the subject. He co-authored several books with Radu Florescu (1925–2014), who was also a professor at Boston College.

== Publications ==
- McNally, Raymond T. (1971). Chaadayev and his friends: an intellectual history of Peter Chaadayev and his Russian contemporaries. Diplomatic Press.
- McNally, Raymond T.; Florescu, Radu (1973). In Search of Dracula: A True History of Dracula and Vampire Legends. Warner Paperback Library. ISBN 0446780693.
- McNally, Raymond T.; Florescu, Radu (1974). Dracula: A biography of Vlad the Impaler.
- McNally, Raymond T. (1976). A Clutch of Vampires. ISBN 0-07-045671-2.
- Stoker, Bram; McNally, Raymond T.; Florescu, Radu (1980). The essential Dracula: a completely illustrated & annotated edition of Bram Stoker's classic novel. Mayflower Books. ISBN 9780831729936.
- McNally, Raymond T. (1983). Dracula Was a Woman: In Search of the Blood Countess of Transylvania. New York: McGraw Hill. ISBN 0-07-045671-2.
- McNally, Raymond T.; Florescu, Radu (1989). Dracula, Prince of Many Faces: His Life and His Times. Little, Brown. ISBN 9780316286558. (Volume 1 of Dracula, Prince of Many Faces)
- McNally, Raymond T.; Florescu, Radu (1994). In Search of Dracula: The History of Dracula and Vampires. Houghton Mifflin Harcourt. ISBN 9780395657836.
- McNally, Raymond T.; Florescu, Radu (2000). In Search of Dr. Jekyll and Mr. Hyde. St. Martin's Press. ISBN 9781580631570.
