= Mănăștiur =

- Commune
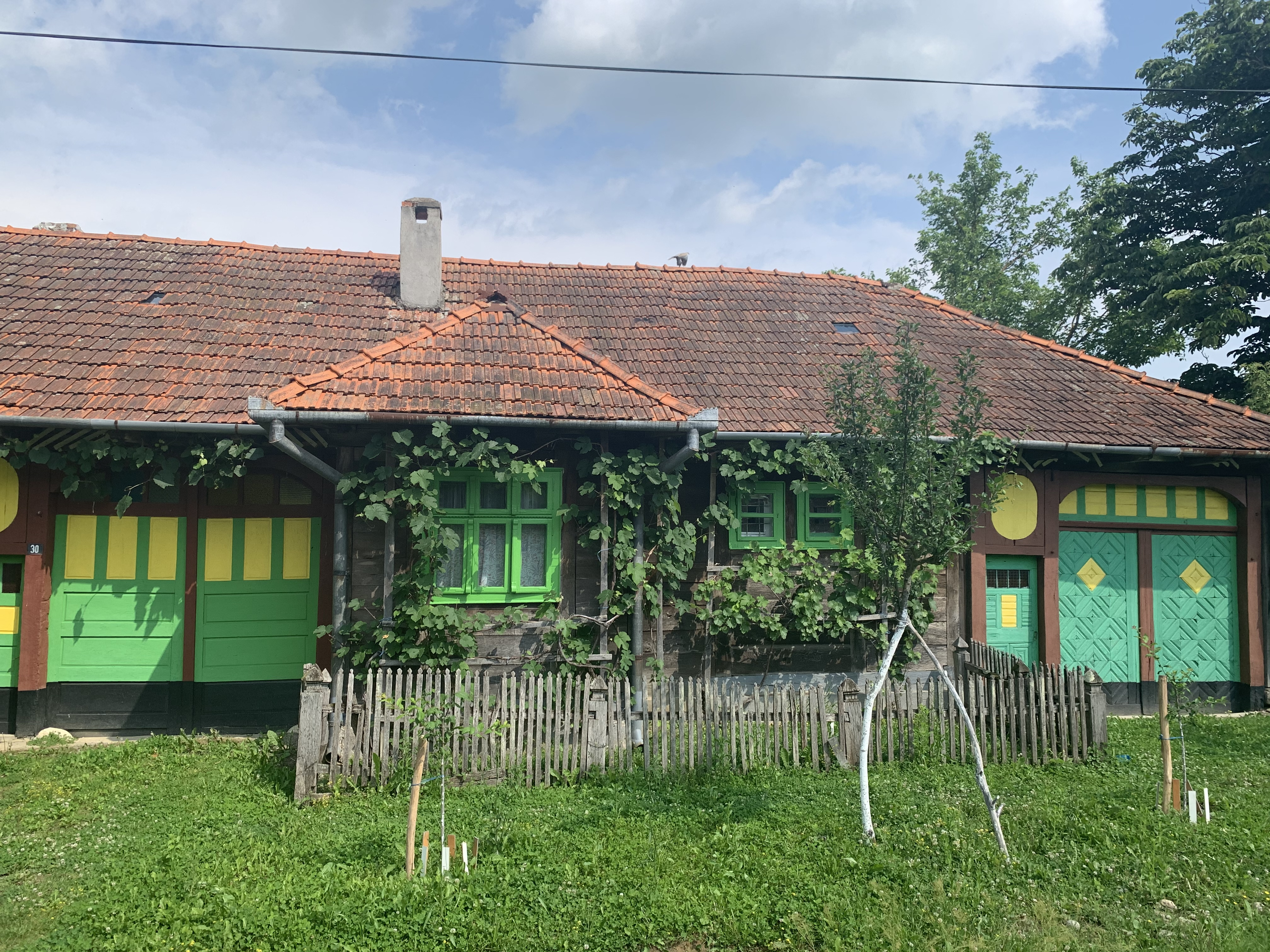
- Wooden house in Pădurani

- Location in Timiș County

- Location in Romania
- Coordinates: 45°50′N 22°4′E
- Country: Romania
- County: Timiș

Government
  - Mayor (2004–): Ionel Curuți (PSD)
- Area: 41.86 km^{2} (16.16 sq mi)
- Population (2021-12-01): 1,649
  - Density: 39.39/km^{2} (102.0/sq mi)
- Time zone: UTC+02:00 (EET)
  - Summer (DST): UTC+03:00 (EEST)
- Postal code: 307275–307278
- Vehicle reg.: TM
- Website: www.primariamanastiur.ro

Mănăștiur (Hungarian: Bégamonostor; German: Manester) is a commune in Timiș County, Romania. It is composed of four villages: Mănăștiur (commune seat), Pădurani, Remetea-Luncă and Topla. It is located in the contact area of the Lugoj Plain with the Lipova Plateau, on the upper course of the Bega River.

== History ==
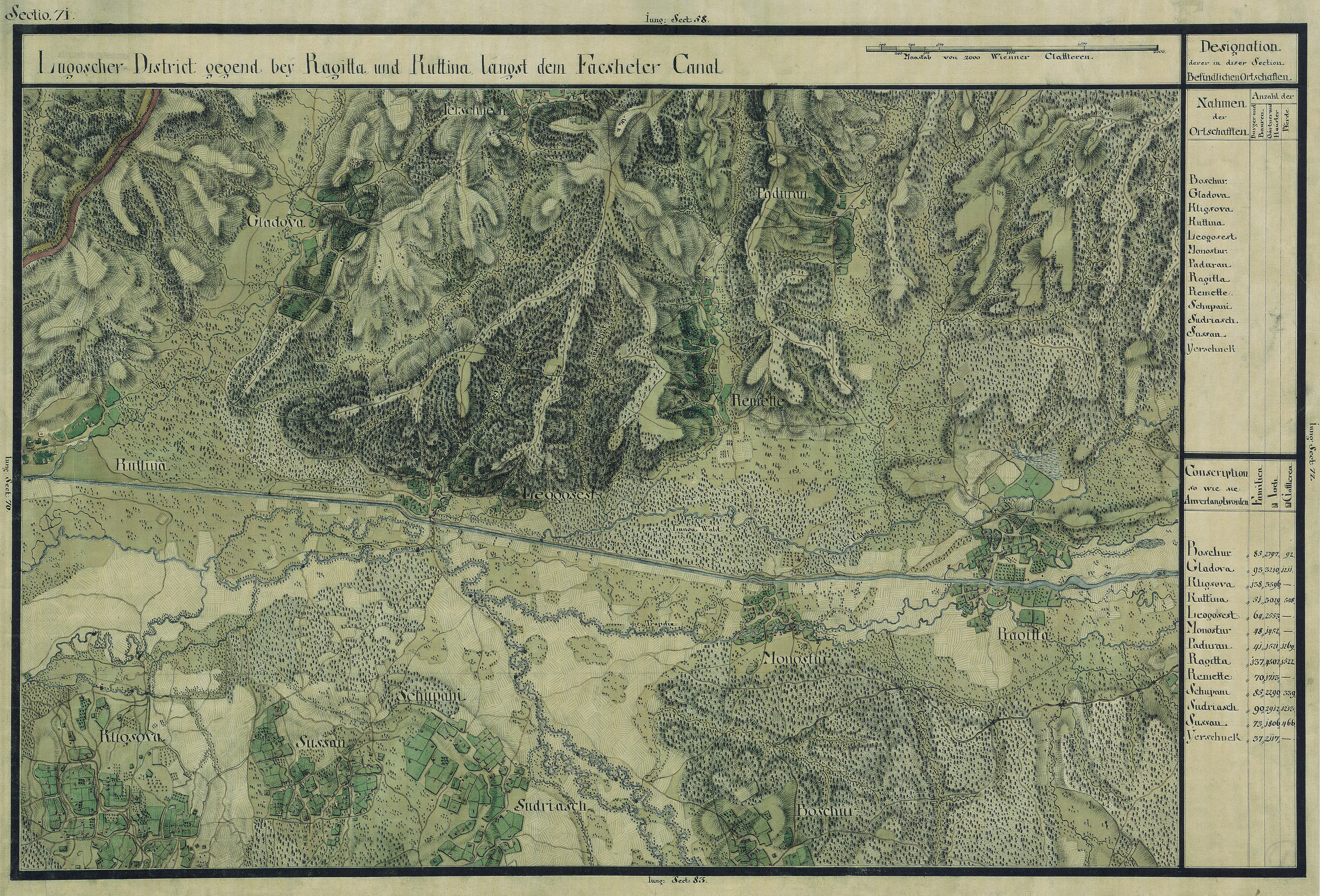
Mănăștiur (Monostur) in the Josephinische Landesaufnahme of 1769–1772

The first recorded mention of the toponym Mănăștiur dates from 1427, and in 1453 the actual settlement is recorded in the Hungarian royal documents as Monostor, located in Temes County. It is very possible that this name comes from the existence of a monastery, because everywhere in Transylvania where this name was taken over by a settlement, there was a monastery. What is certain is that a fortress was built here during this period, because in 1505 the village is mentioned as castellum Monosthor. The fortresses of Mănăștiur and Margina had the same captain who had taken the oath before Count Brandenburg, married to Beatrice, the widow of Matthias Corvinus. For a while, Mănăștiur did not belong to either Hungary or Transylvania, which is why in 1519 an order was issued by which it was annexed to Temes County.

Mănăștiur Fortress was located north of the village, on the right bank of Bega River. In 1551 it was completely demolished by Count Petru Petrovici, who started a fight against Gheorghe Frater. A little later, in 1554, the fortress was rebuilt and the Count of Temes, Petre Popovici, reclaimed it from the leader of the Temeşvar Eyalet, Pasha Kazan. Although little is known from the Turkish occupation of Banat, Mănăștiur continued to exist, as evidenced by Marsigli's writings of 1690–1700, which speak of Monostor as part of the Făget District. The fate of the fortress is also unclear, it is not known when it was demolished, evidence of its existence being only a round ditch called by locals Mănăstire ("Monastery").

After the conquest of Banat by the Austrians, in 1717, the locality is registered with 20 houses and is assigned to the Făget District. In 1779, on the occasion of the re-establishment of the Krassó County, Mănăștiur was assigned to the Bulci District.

After 1880, the Hungarian authorities brought to Mănăștiur 150 families of Hungarian settlers, in a plan to Hungarianize the area, which also included several neighboring villages, including Dumbrava. The Hungarians built their houses of clay brick and formed a few alleys inhabited only by them, which run perpendicular to the main street. Some original houses of the settlers are still preserved today. In 1902 the Romanian Orthodox church was built, and in 1906 the Hungarians built a Reformed church. In the interwar period, the village was part of Plasa Balinț, Severin County.

== Demographics ==
Ethnic composition (2021)
1. Romanians (84.9%)
2. Roma (4.18%)
3. Hungarians (3.27%)
4. Others (7.66%)
Religious composition (2021)
1. Orthodox (75.7%)
2. Pentecostals (12.8%)
3. Reformed (3.03%)
4. Unknown (7.45%)
5. Others (1.05%)

Mănăștiur had a population of 1,649 inhabitants at the 2021 census, down 0.54% from the 2011 census. Most inhabitants are Romanians (84.89%), larger minorities being represented by Roma (4.18%) and Hungarians (3.27%). By religion, most inhabitants are Orthodox (75.68%), but there are also minorities of Pentecostals (12.79%) and Reformed (3.03%). For 7.45% of the population, religious affiliation is unknown.

Census		Ethnic composition
Year	Population	Romanians	Hungarians	Germans	Roma	Ukrainians
1880	1,563	1,486	2	57	–	–
1890	1,677	1,620	3	30	–	–
1900	1,952	1,761	34	25	–	–
1910	2,287	1,966	294	5	–	–
1920	2,129	1,845	258	18	–	–
1930	2,220	1,776	238	18	181	1
1941	2,285	1,989	263	15	–	–
1956	2,464	2,148	272	9	–	–
1966	2,365	2,090	250	10	–	12
1977	2,094	1,875	198	8	10	3
1992	1,741	1,556	166	6	9	3
2002	1,781	1,597	104	3	52	25
2011	1,658	1,485	62	3	30	10
2021	1,649	1,400	54	–	69	5

== Politics and administration ==
The commune of Mănăștiur is administered by a mayor and a local council composed of 11 councilors. The mayor, Ionel Curuți, from the Social Democratic Party, has been in office since 2004. As from the 2024 local elections, the local council has the following composition by political parties:

Party	Seats	Composition
Social Democratic Party	3	
Democratic Alliance of Hungarians in Romania	2	
National Liberal Party	2	
Save Romania Union–People's Movement Party–Force of the Right	2	
National Peasant Alliance	1	
Alliance for the Union of Romanians	1	
