= Margina =

- Commune
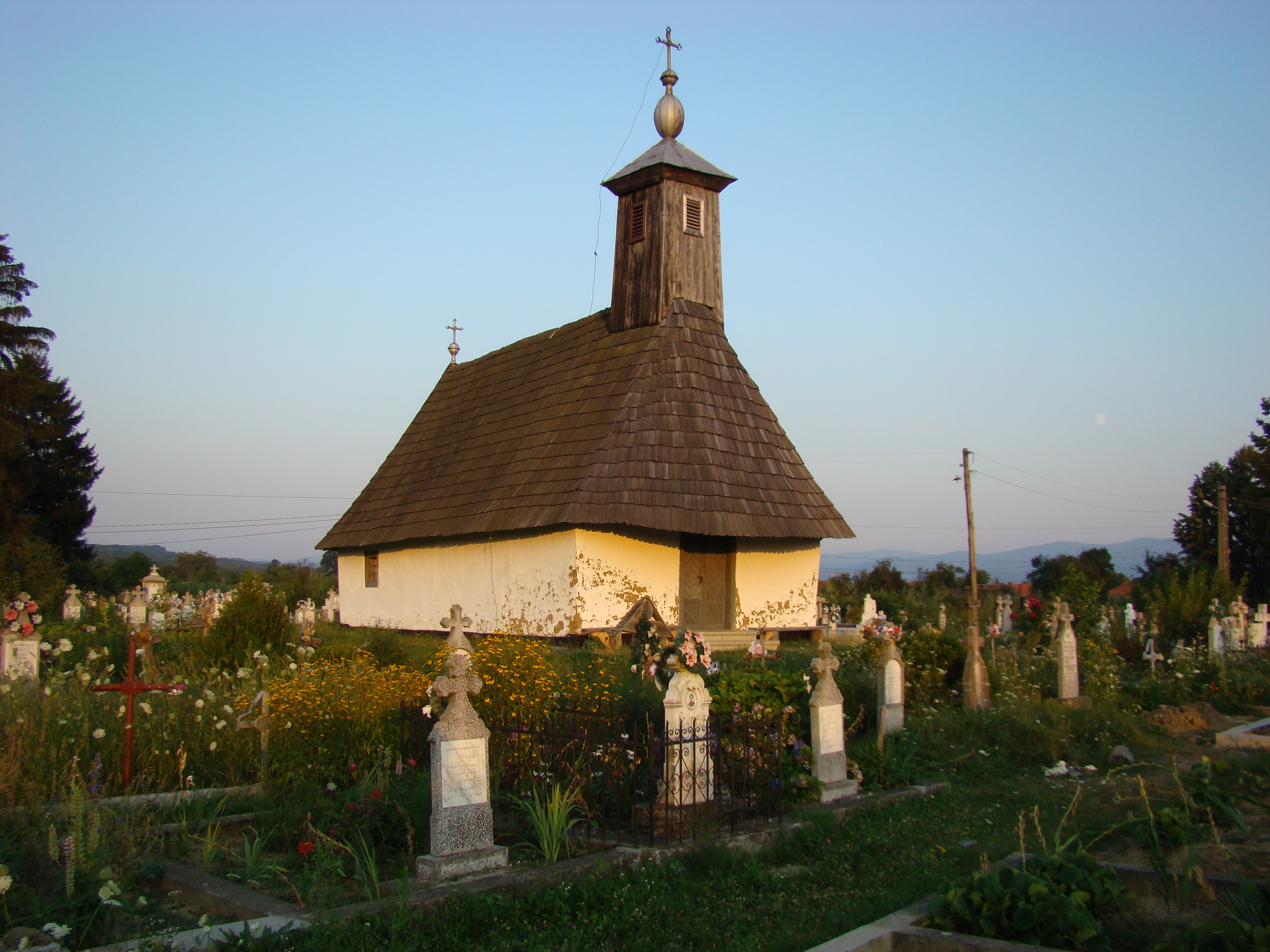
- The wooden church in Margina

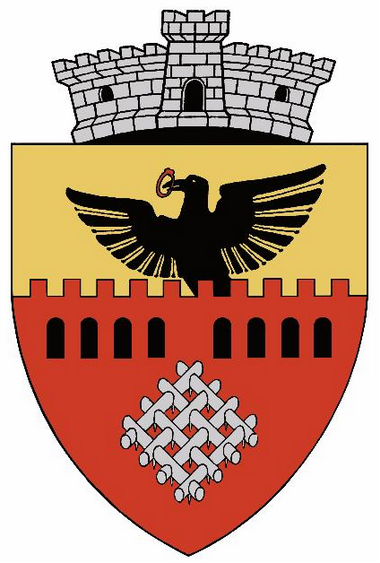
- Coat of arms

- Location in Timiș County

- Location in Romania
- Coordinates: 45°51′N 22°16′E
- Country: Romania
- County: Timiș

Government
  - Mayor (2024–): Cosmin-Simion Popescu (PSD)
- Area: 132.81 km^{2} (51.28 sq mi)
- Elevation: 402 m (1,319 ft)
- Population (2021-12-01): 2,074
  - Density: 15.62/km^{2} (40.45/sq mi)
- Time zone: UTC+02:00 (EET)
  - Summer (DST): UTC+03:00 (EEST)
- Postal code: 307260–307269
- Vehicle reg.: TM
- Website: www.primariamargina.ro

Margina (Hungarian: Marzsina; German: Marschina; Serbian: Маржина, romanized: Maržina) is a commune in Timiș County, Romania. It is composed of nine villages: Breazova, Bulza, Coșevița, Coșteiu de Sus, Groși, Margina (commune seat), Nemeșești, Sintești and Zorani.

== Geography ==
Margina is located in the eastern extremity of Timiș County, 8 km (5 mi) east of Făget, and is crossed by the Bega River. The commune has an area of 132.81 km^{2} (51.28 sq mi), which represents about 1.5% of the area of Timiș County.

=== Flora ===
The vegetation consists of forests, secondary meadows, floodplain meadows, trees and agricultural crops. The forests cover an area of 77.74 square kilometres (30 sq mi) and are managed by Făget Forest District and Valea Mare Forest District in Arad County. The most important species of trees found in the forests of the commune are beech, sessile oak, pedunculate oak, Hungarian oak, Turkey oak, hornbeam, black locust, lime (especially in the forests of Coșteiu de Sus and Groși), elm, birch, wild pear, crab apple, wild cherry and pine plantations. At the edge of the forest grow hazel, cornels, dogwoods, dog roses and other shrubs.

=== Fauna ===
The forest wildlife is very varied. Characteristic species include the lynx (Lynx lynx) and the squirrel (Sciurus spp.), which, although it lives in coniferous forests, descends into beech and sessile oak forests. Forests are also home to badgers (Meles meles), red foxes (Vulpes vulpes) and wolves (Canis lupus). The wild boar (Sus scrofa) is quite widespread in the forests of the commune, it descends for food to the vicinity of households and causes significant damage to wheat and corn fields. An increasing number of deer and stags are found in the forests, which also descend for food to people's homes. Brown rats, shrews, harvest mice and susliks inhabit the cornfields and hayfields.

Birds are varied and widespread throughout the area; non-predatory birds of hunting interest (pheasants and partridges), birds of prey (hawks), crows and magpies, and migratory birds (storks, cuckoos, turtle doves, larks, nightingales, hoopoes, blackbirds and tits). In the forest and meadows woodpeckers, white wagtails, hazel grouse, little owls, eagle-owls, sparrows, etc., also live.

Reptiles and batrachians are represented by green lizard, sand lizard, grass snake, dice snake, salamander, toad, marsh frog, tree frog and, rarely, a few turtle specimens.

Along the Bega River there are different fish such as nases and chubs, and on the sandy bottom of the river there are barbels; sometimes trout also wander on the middle course of the river.

== History ==
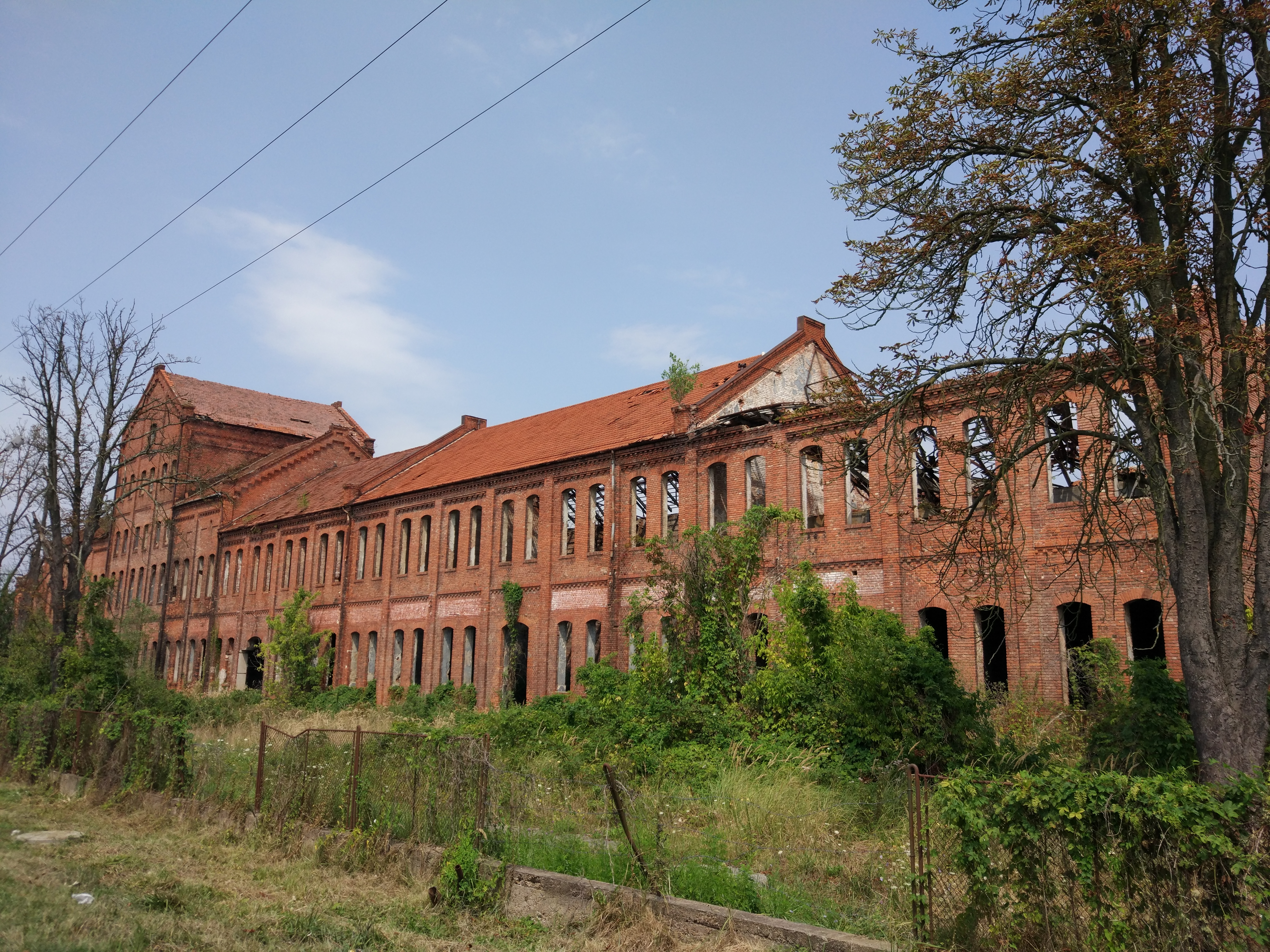
Ruins of the former vinegar factory, closed in 1998

The first recorded mention of Margina dates from 1365, but it is mentioned even before 1300 as the seat of a Vlach district belonging sometimes to Hunyad County and sometimes to Temes County. In the Middle Ages it played an important role in the area; here there was a fortress, first mentioned in 1439 and disputed by the lords of the time. In 1551 the fortress was demolished by John Török, but was rebuilt three years later. The Turks occupied Margina for a time, until it was liberated by Sigismund Báthory. In 1658, as a result of the political interests of Ákos Barcsay, Margina was ceded to the Turks, who ruled it for 30 years.

After the Treaty of Passarowitz, the old fortresses of Banat are demolished. The ruins of the fortress of Margina were still visible at the end of the 18th century. The settlement continued its existence under the Austrians, as a settlement located on the border of Banat with Transylvania. In 1734, the Romanian wooden church was built, which still exists today and is a national historical monument.

At the end of the 18th century, Germans and Hungarians settled here, brought as officials or workers in the vinegar factory, one of the largest in Europe at that time. Up until 1930 the factory produced acetone and then vinegar and canned cucumbers and pickles. Because of the transition to state socialism during 1945 and 1947 it was closed, before being nationalized in 1948. During the 1960s–1970s it employed over 700 people. The factory closed permanently in 1998.

== Demographics ==
Ethnic composition (2021)
1. Romanians (88.6%)
2. Ukrainians (1.97%)
3. Unknown (7.90%)
4. Others (1.56%)
Religious composition (2021)
1. Orthodox (66.5%)
2. Pentecostals (18.8%)
3. Baptists (3.42%)
4. Roman Catholics (1.35%)
5. Unknown (8.38%)
6. Others (1.28%)
7. Irreligious, atheists and agnostics (0.24%)

Margina had a population of 2,074 inhabitants at the 2021 census, down 5.12% from the 2011 census. Most inhabitants are Romanians (88.57%), with a minority of Ukrainians (1.97%). For 7.9% of the population, ethnicity is unknown. By religion, most inhabitants are Orthodox (66.53%), but there are also minorities of Pentecostals (18.8%), Baptists (3.42%) and Roman Catholics (1.35%). For 8.38% of the population, religious affiliation is unknown.

Census		Ethnic composition
Year	Population	Romanians	Hungarians	Germans	Ukrainians	Slovaks
1880	4,045	4,015	12	13	–	–
1890	4,180	4,118	1	18	–	–
1900	4,157	4,061	44	39	–	–
1910	4,305	4,115	102	57	–	3
1920	3,964	3,842	43	37	–	–
1930	4,240	3,936	132	75	–	6
1941	3,941	3,750	118	57	–	–
1956	3,637	3,508	67	32	1	6
1966	3,494	3,349	64	46	1	21
1977	2,987	2,904	44	27	2	–
1992	2,469	2,378	43	13	12	11
2002	2,356	2,188	35	7	104	10
2011	2,186	2,032	24	5	48	8
2021	2,074	1,837	20	–	41	8

== Politics and administration ==
The commune of Margina is administered by a mayor and a local council composed of 11 councilors. The mayor, Cosmin-Simion Popescu, from the Social Democratic Party, has been in office since 2021. As from the 2024 local elections, the local council has the following composition by political parties:

Party	Seats	Composition
Social Democratic Party	6	
National Liberal Party	2	
Alliance for the Union of Romanians	2	
Save Romania Union	1	

== Gallery ==
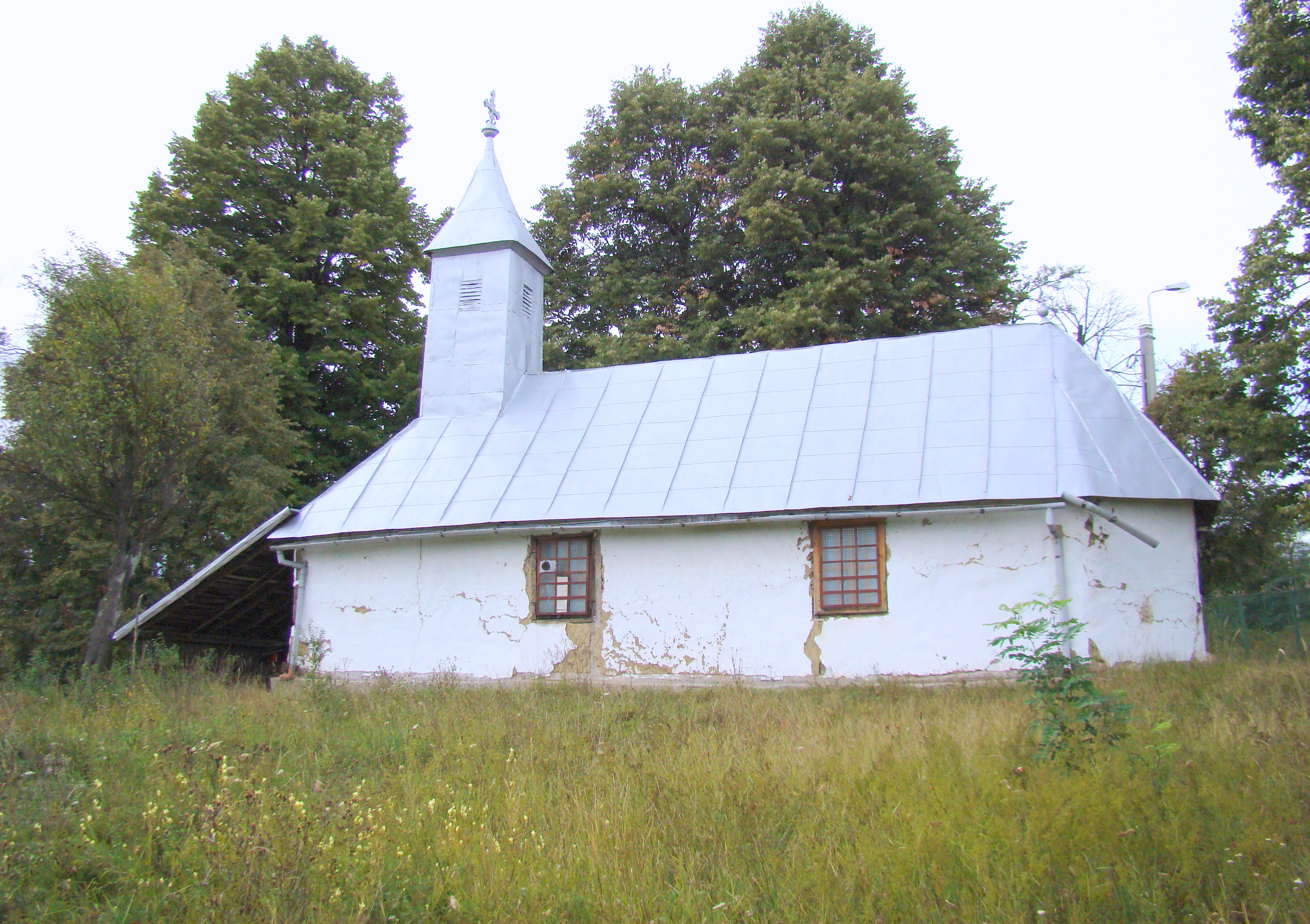
The wooden church in Coșevița (1776)

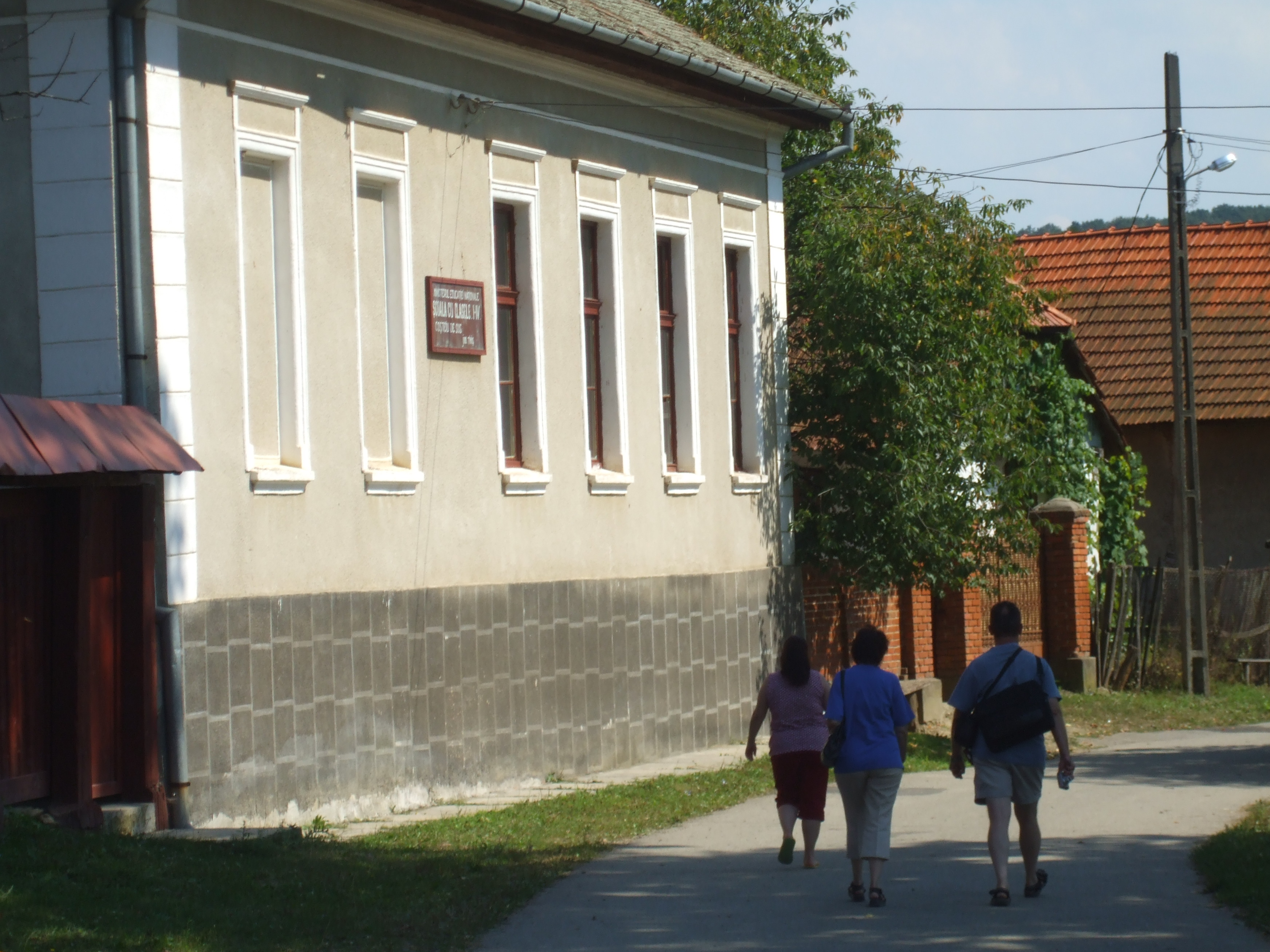
The school in Coșteiu de Sus

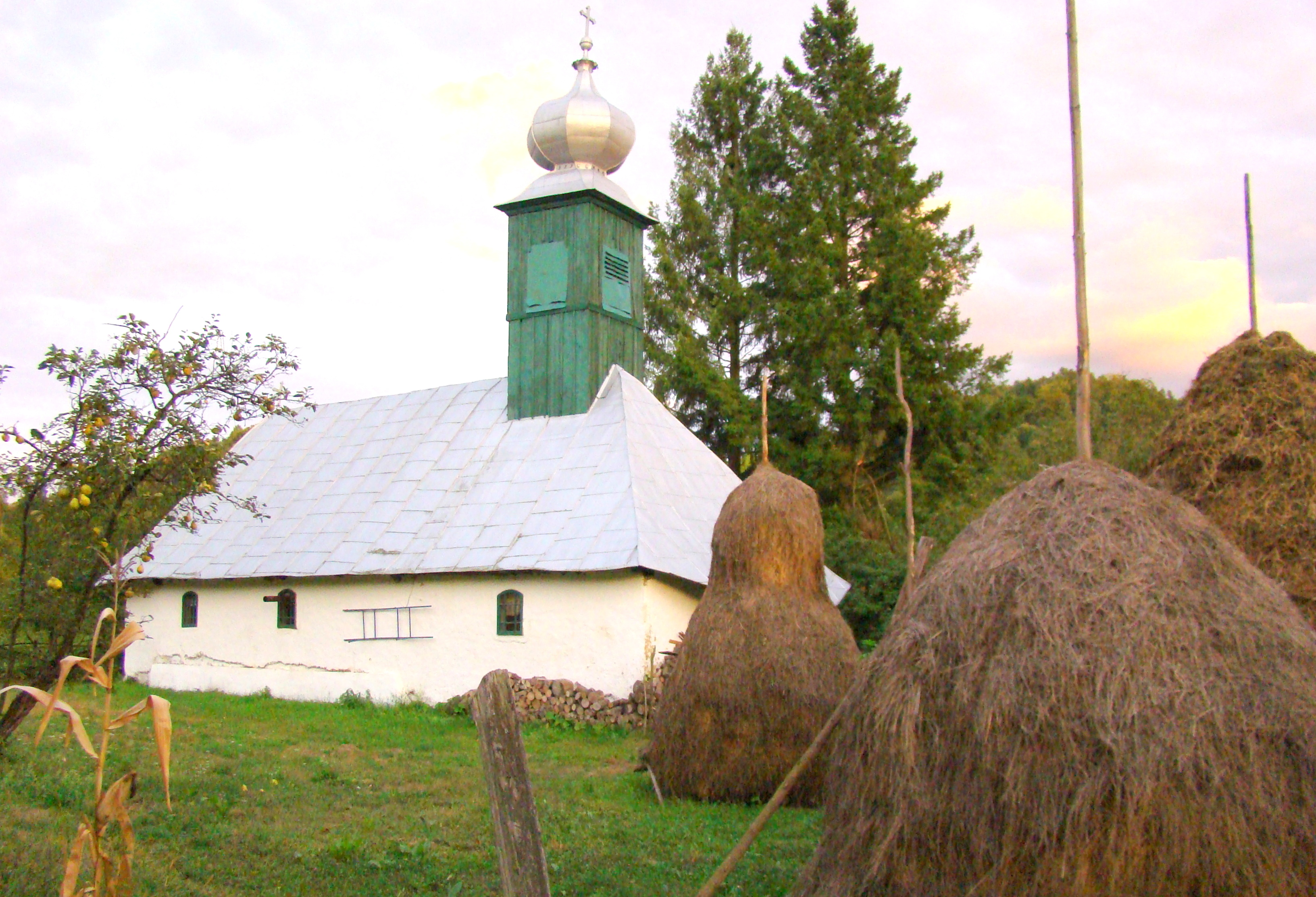
The wooden church in Groși (1741)

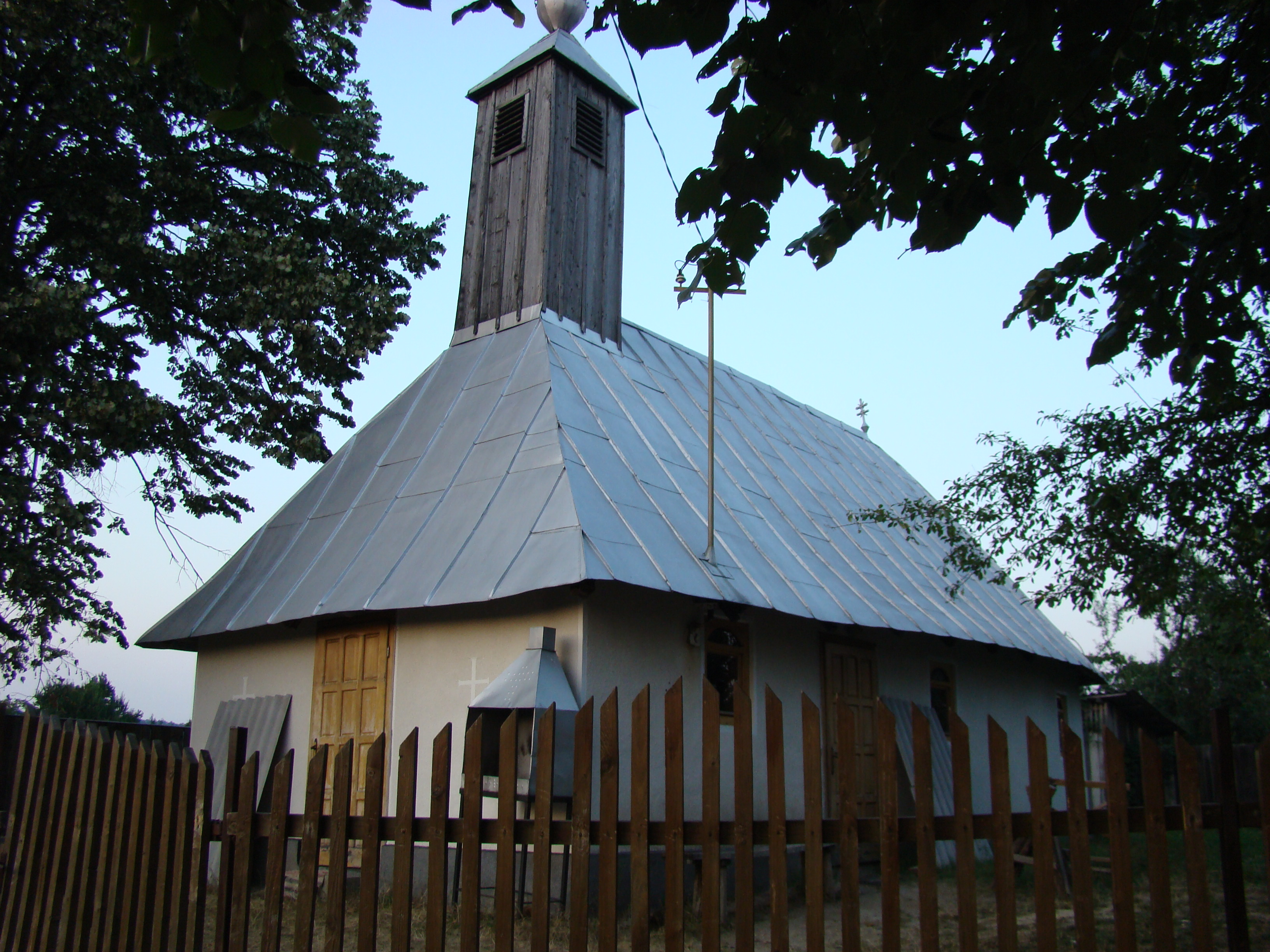
The wooden church in Nemeșești (1798)
