= Matei Cazacu =

Romanian historian (born 1946)

Matei Cazacu (born July 11, 1946, Sinaia) is a Romanian-born French author, essayist, medieval historian, and human rights activist.

== Biography ==
Member of the Romanian section of the League for the Defense of Human Rights, of the Association for the Defense of Historical Monuments in Romania.

== Selected works ==
- 1975 - Matei Cazacu, Radu R. Florescu, Alan G. Barbour - In Search of Frankenstein, Boston, New York Graphic Society. ISBN 9780821206140.
- 1988 - L'Histoire du prince Dracula en Europe centrale et orientale au XVe siècle. Edition critique, traduction, notes et commentaires, Genève, Droz. ISBN 978-2-600-00504-3
  - 2nd and 3rd editions, reprints 1996 and 2006
- 1993 - In ex-Soviet Moldavia. Histoire et débats en cours, Paris, Akratie, (co-author)
  - 2007 - 2nd Edition, revue et completée, sous presse, Paris
- 1997 - A world in a cookbook. A cookbook at the time of Constantin Brâncoveanu (1688-1714), Bucharest, Romanian Cultural Foundation, (co-author)
- 1998 - They have the Caucasus. Russes et Tchétchènes, récits d'une guerre sans fin (1785-1996), Genève, Georg Editeur
- 1998 - History of Oriental Slaves. Bibliographie des sources historiques traduites en langues occidentales (Xe siècle - 1689), Paris, CNRS Editions et l'Institut d'études slaves, (co-author)
- 1999 - The Story of Romanian Gastronomy, Bucharest, Romanian Cultural Foundation
- 1999 - Des femmes sur les routes de l'Orient. Le voyage à Constantinople aux XVIIIe-XIXe siècles, Genève, Georg Editeur, 1999
- 2001 - Matei Cazacu, George Ciorănescu - Bessarabia, Romanian land disputed between East and West, 2 volumes, Bucharest, Romanian Cultural Foundation
- 2003 - Miracles, visions and premonitory dreams in the Romanian past, Bucharest, Sigma Publishing House
- 2004 - Interwar Romania, Bucharest, NOI Media Print Publishing House, 2004
- 2004 - Dracula, Paris, Editions Tallandier, Prix Thiers de l'Académie Française
- 2005 - Gilles de Rais, Paris, Tallandier
- 2006 - L'histoire du prince Dracula en Europe centrale et orientale (15th century)
- 2007 - Romania in 1900, Bucharest, NOI Media Print Publishing House, 2007. In press. (La Roumanie en 1900)
- 2007 - La Barbe!, Paris, Tallandier
- 2007 - Romania as seen by foreigners, Bucharest, NOI Publishing House, Media Print
- 2008 - L'Eglise orientale et l'argent. L'embarras de la richesse, in collaboration with Violeta Barbu, Editions de l'Institut Culturel Roumain, Bucharest
- 2010 - Matei Cazacu, Nicolas Trifon - A state in search of a nation - The Republic of Moldova, (A state in search of a nation - The Republic of Moldova), NON LIEU Publishing House, Paris
- 2013 - Matei Cazacu, Dan Ioan Mureșan, Ioan Basarab, a Romanian gentleman at the beginnings of Wallachia, Cartier Publishing House, Chișinău.

== Awards ==
Prix Thiers de l'Academie Française - Dracula, Paris, Editions Tallandier
