= Făget =

- Town
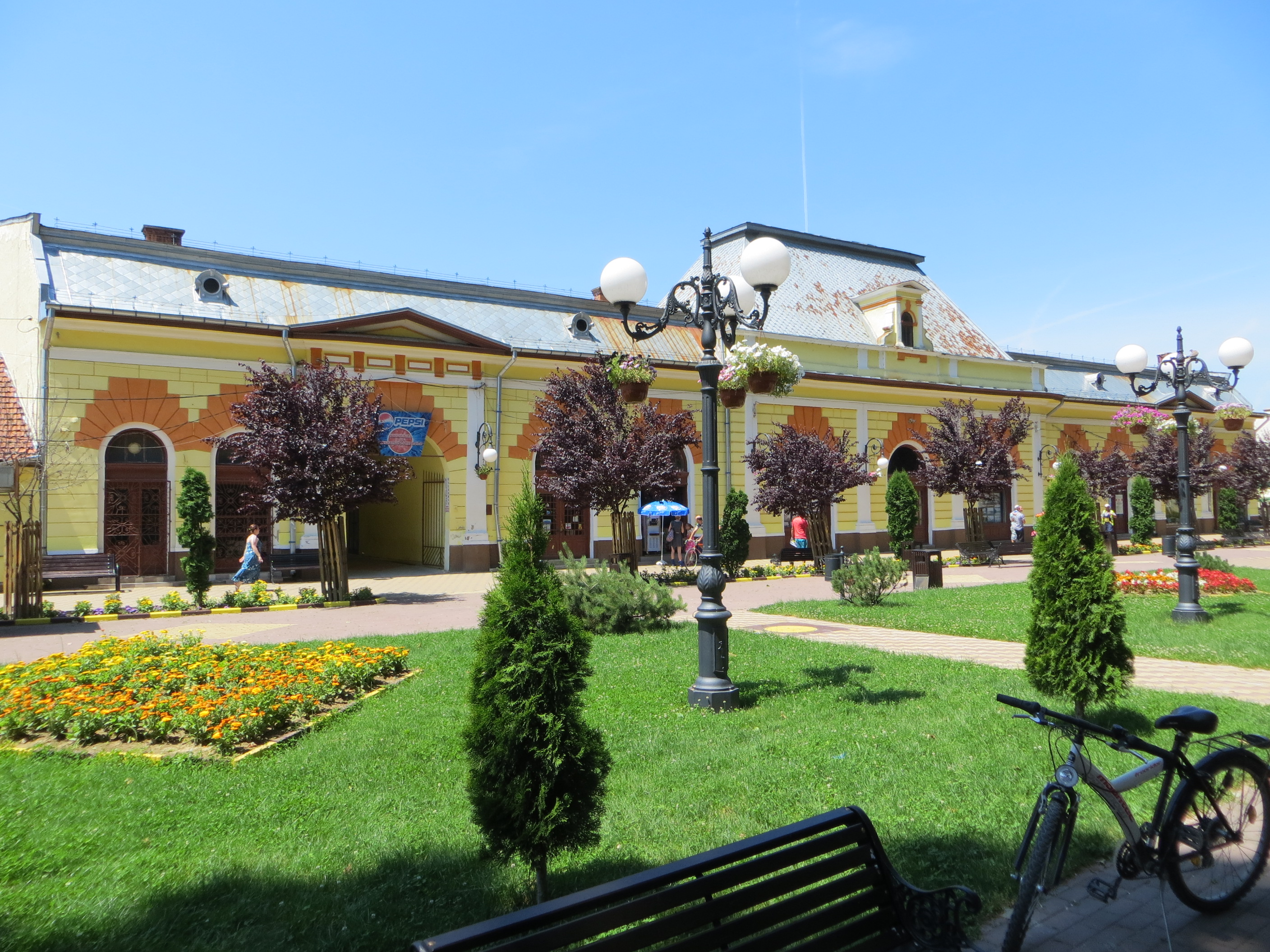
- Cassina Casino

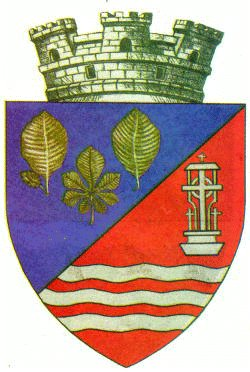
- Coat of arms

- Location in Timiș County

- Location in Romania
- Coordinates: 45°51′6″N 22°10′28″E
- Country: Romania
- County: Timiș

Government
  - Mayor (2024–2028): Claudiu-Ionel Avramescu (PNL)
- Area: 150.86 km^{2} (58.25 sq mi)
- Elevation: 165 m (541 ft)
- Population (2021-12-01): 6,595
  - Density: 43.72/km^{2} (113.2/sq mi)
- Time zone: UTC+02:00 (EET)
  - Summer (DST): UTC+03:00 (EEST)
- Postal code: 305300–305310
- Vehicle reg.: TM
- Website: www.primariafaget.ro

Făget (Romanian pronunciation: [fəˈdʒet]; Hungarian: Facsád; German: Birkendorf or Fatschet; Serbian: Фачет, romanized: Fačet) is a town in Timiș County, Romania, with a population of about 6,600. The town administers ten villages: Bătești, Begheiu Mic, Bichigi, Brănești, Bunea Mare, Bunea Mică (depopulated), Colonia Mică, Jupânești, Povârgina and Temerești.

== Name ==
The name Făget literally means "beech forest" in Romanian.

== Geography ==
Făget is located in the southwest of Romania, in the contact area of the Lugoj Plain with the Lugoj Hills, on the upper course of the Bega River. Within Timiș County, it is located in its eastern part, 98 km (61 mi) from Timișoara and 33 km (21 mi) from Lugoj, to which it is connected by national road 68A. The same road to the east connects the town with Deva, 68 km (42 mi) away. The town is also crossed by CFR line 212 (Lugoj–Făget–Ilia).

== History ==
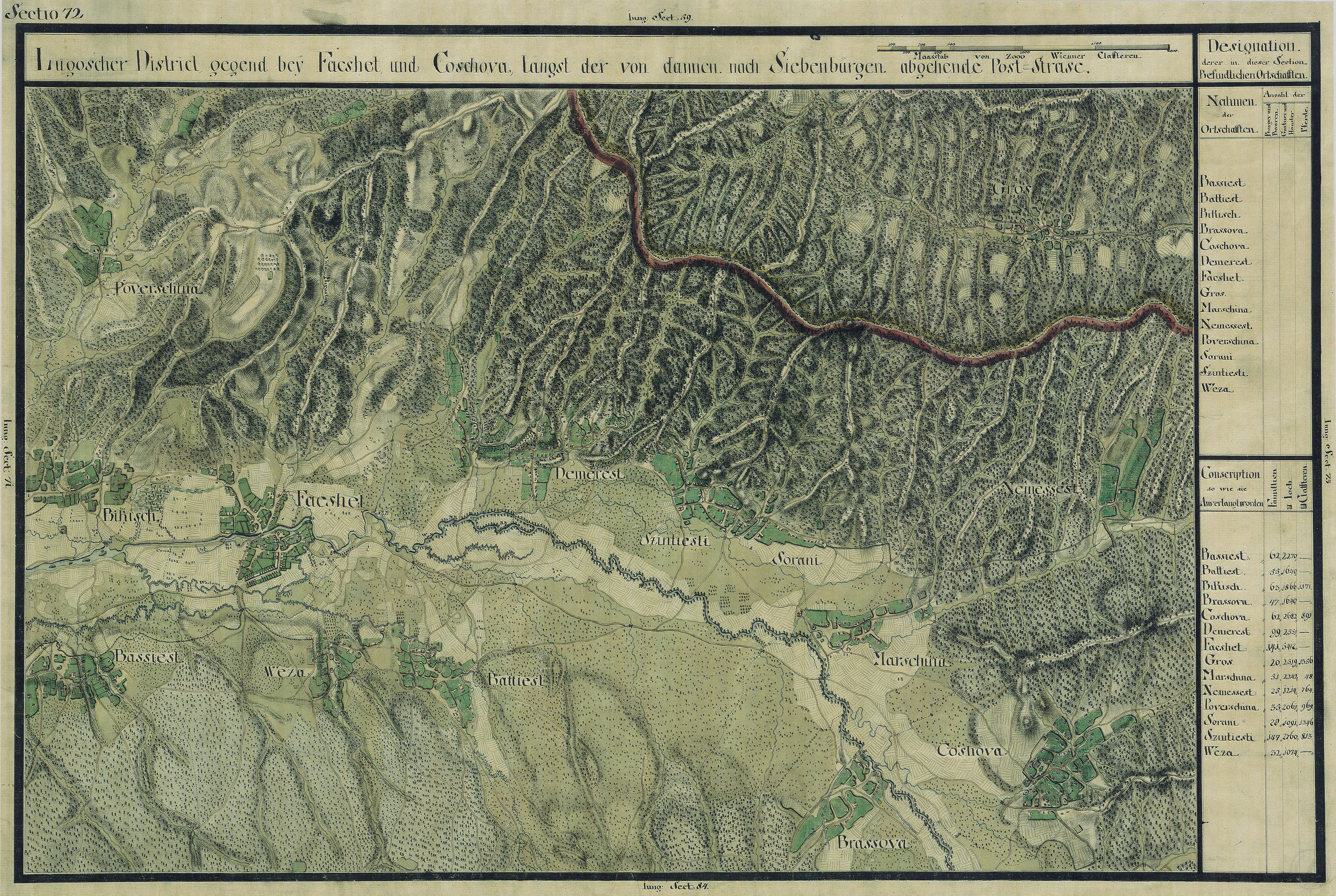
Făget (Facshet) on the Josephinische Landesaufnahme of 1769–1772

Făget Fortress is documented for the first time in 1548, as the property of Jakab Békés and bearing the name Fagyath. Between 1594–1602 Făget was the property of the Ban of Lugoj. In 1602 it was besieged and destroyed by the Turks, after which it fell into ruin. For 150 years it has been the subject of fierce confrontations between Romanians, Turks and Austrians, which is also confirmed by archaeological excavations. The picturesque landscape of Făget, the intense spiritual activity and its famous fairs attracted the attention of some foreign travelers who passed through Transylvania and Banat. In 1660, Turkish traveler Evliya Çelebi, passing through Făget, described the medieval fortress:

It was built by a woman named Tilen... It is a square-shaped building, beautiful and strong. To the west is a gate facing the plain. It has a dizdar, three hundred chosen soldiers and enough war material; it is entirely covered with shingles, but it has no market and bazaar or anything. It is just a serhat tower.

The civilian settlement evolved along with the military fortress, becoming in a relatively short period of time the most important locality in the area. The fortress was finally demolished by the Turks in 1699. Immediately after Banat was conquered by the Austrians in 1717, Făget had only 20 houses left, but it was the center of a district with 42 communes. After this period of decline, the town began to grow again and in 1787 received the right to hold eight fairs a year. At the end of the 18th century, Johann Lehmann wrote:

Făget is a beautiful country town. The place is rich because of the animal fairs that are held here. The town is Romanian, has over 200 houses and two churches. The inn in Făget is the most beautiful and the cleanest and most spacious on the whole Timișoara–Sibiu line and this inn is the property of Mrs. Soro [the wife of the commander of the Timișoara Fortress]. There are eight guest rooms in the inn. The travelers are well served, but a very expensive price.

On the same note, Italian traveler Domenico Sestini noted that, at the beginning of the 19th century, Făget had "200 Romanian houses with two churches and over 30 German houses with a small but clean church, served by the Minorite monks from Lugoj". Făget was also an important connection point between Banat and Transylvania, here being a "custom house for Transylvania and Hungary".

In the 17th and 18th centuries, attempts were made to colonize workers of other nationalities to work on forest exploitations, but the impact is small and Făget remains a center of Romanianism at a time when western Banat was intensely colonized. In 1900, attempts were made to settle the first families of Hungarian settlers in Colonia Mică.

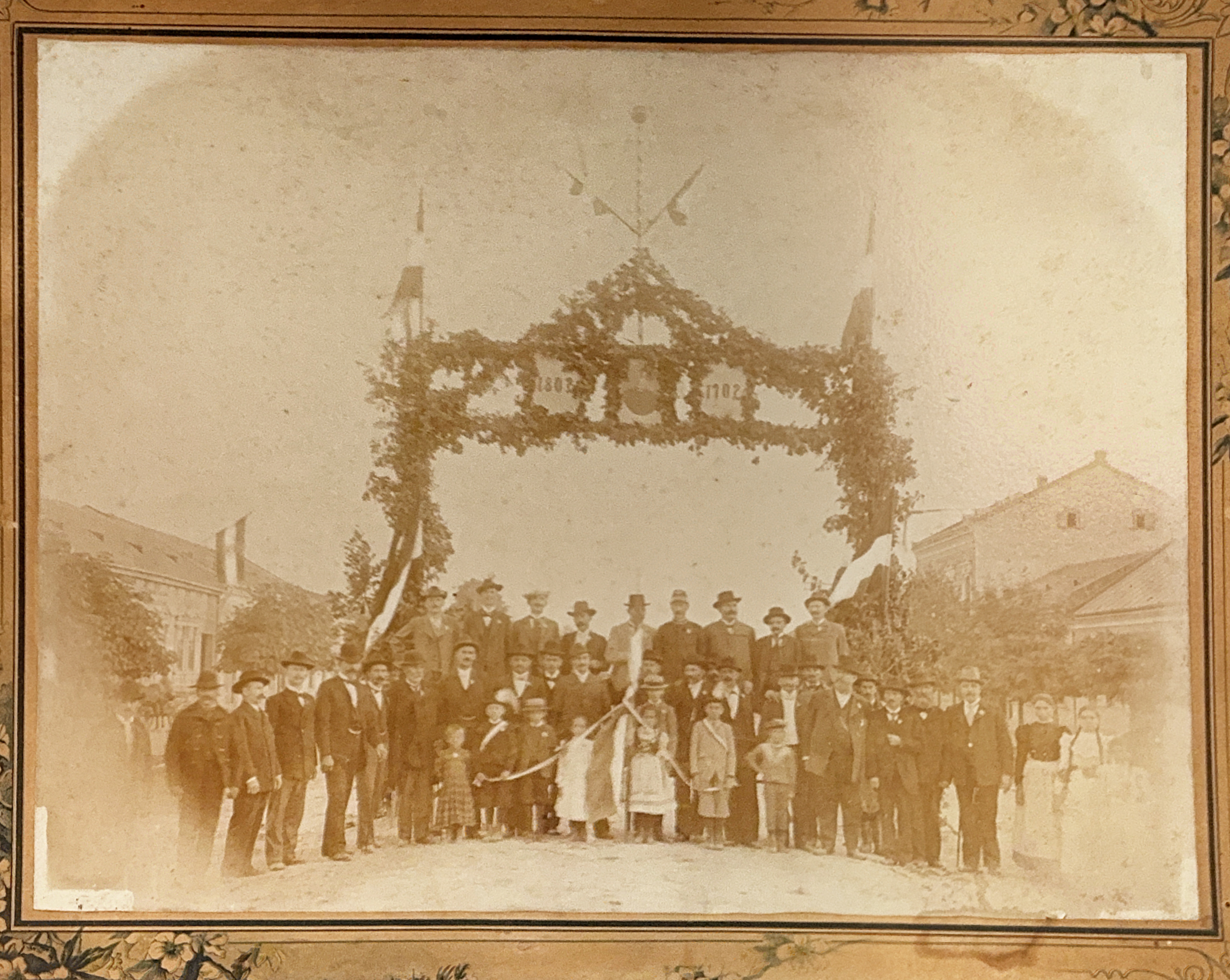
People from Făget celebrating the anniversary of the town

On 5 July 1994, Făget was declared a town, with 10 villages subordinated to it.

== Demographics ==
Ethnic composition (2021)
1. Romanians (86.5%)
2. Hungarians (2.22%)
3. Ukrainians (1.59%)
4. Roma (1.04%)
5. Unknown (8.17%)
6. Others (0.50%)
Religious composition (2021)
1. Orthodox (63.3%)
2. Pentecostals (19.7%)
3. Roman Catholics (2.62%)
4. Baptists (2.03%)
5. Adventists (2.01%)
6. Unknown (8.80%)
7. Others (1.25%)
8. Irreligious, atheists and agnostics (0.28%)

Făget had a population of 6,595 inhabitants at the 2021 census, down 2.46% from the 2011 census. Most inhabitants are Romanians (86.48%), larger minorities being represented by Hungarians (2.22%), Ukrainians (1.59%) and Roma (1.04%). For 8.17% of the population, ethnicity is unknown. By religion, most inhabitants are Orthodox (63.33%), but there are also minorities of Pentecostals (19.68%), Roman Catholics (2.62%), Baptists (2.03%) and Adventists (2.01%). For 8.8% of the population, religious affiliation is unknown.

Census		Ethnic composition
Year	Population	Romanians	Hungarians	Germans	Roma	Ukrainians
1880	6,516	5,576	482	401	–	–
1890	6,882	5,856	548	428	–	–
1900	7,642	6,217	900	468	–	–
1910	8,724	6,532	1,755	383	–	–
1920	7,920	6,122	1,356	287	–	–
1930	8,024	6,290	1,343	265	32	1
1941	7,769	6,230	1,086	295	–	–
1956	7,833	6,800	861	126	8	1
1966	8,276	7,388	740	121	–	1
1977	7,868	7,011	529	104	65	138
1992	7,722	6,888	437	113	81	186
2002	7,213	6,589	335	62	14	203
2011	6,761	6,040	260	44	65	141
2021	6,595	5,704	147	15	69	105

== Politics and administration ==
The town of Făget is administered by a mayor and a local council composed of 15 councilors. The mayor, Claudiu-Ionel Avramescu, from the National Liberal Party, has been in office since 2024. As from the 2024 local elections, the local council has the following composition by political parties:

Party	Seats	Composition
National Liberal Party	8	
Social Democratic Party	4	
Alliance for the Union of Romanians	3	

== Economy ==
The economic sector of production is represented by companies active in the field of leather processing in footwear and leather goods, exploitation and processing of wood of various essences, from lumber to furniture, a section for exploitation and processing of quartz sand and companies active in various branches of the food industry, especially milk processing and pastry production. In the village of Jupânești, there is a tradition in pottery, which is declining as an economic activity, but with a high potential.

== Twin towns ==
Făget is twinned with:

- (Italy) Cervinara
- (Hungary) Elek
- (France) Mirebeau-sur-Bèze

== Gallery ==
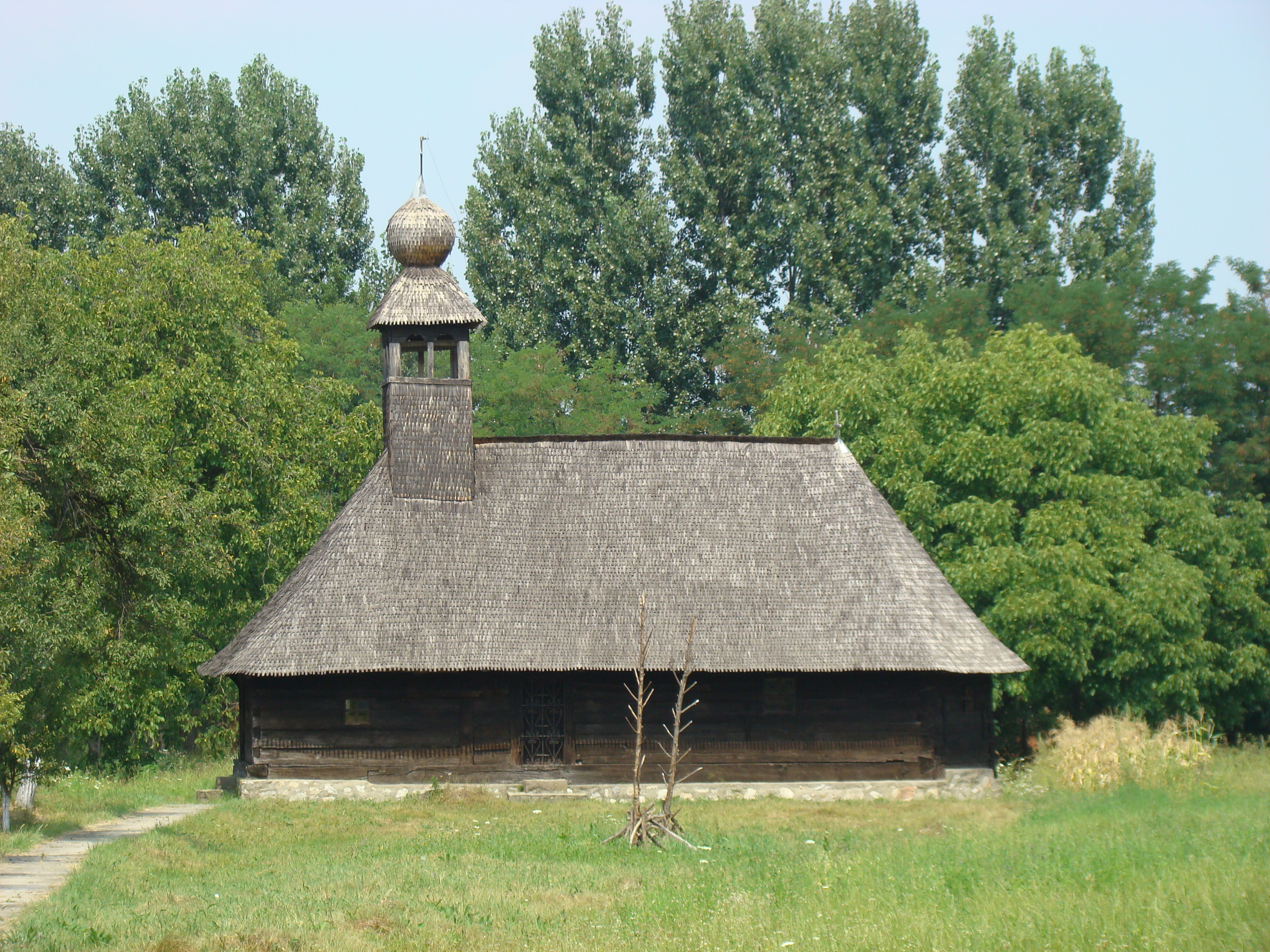
Wooden church in Bătești

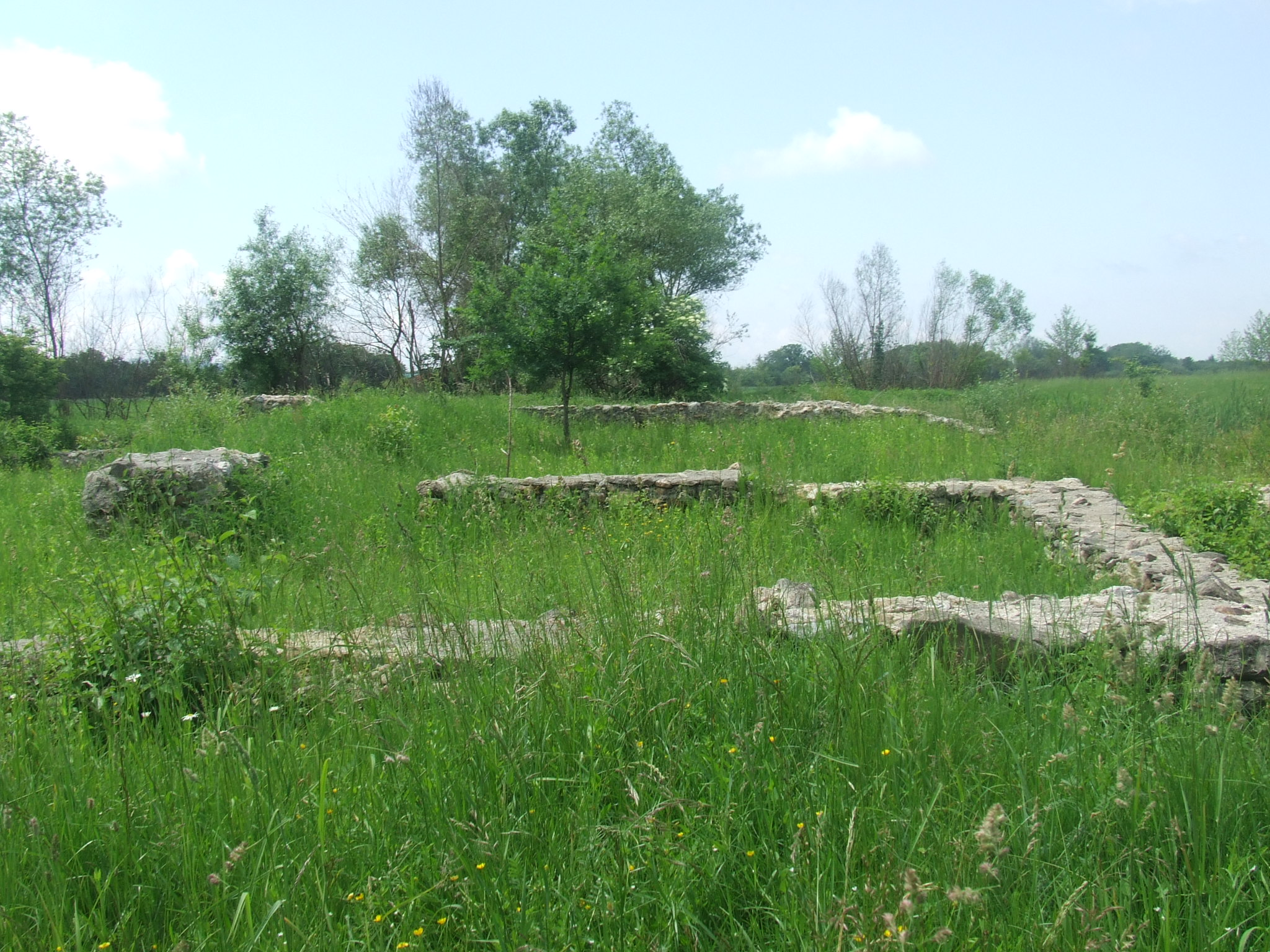
Ruins of the Făget Fortress

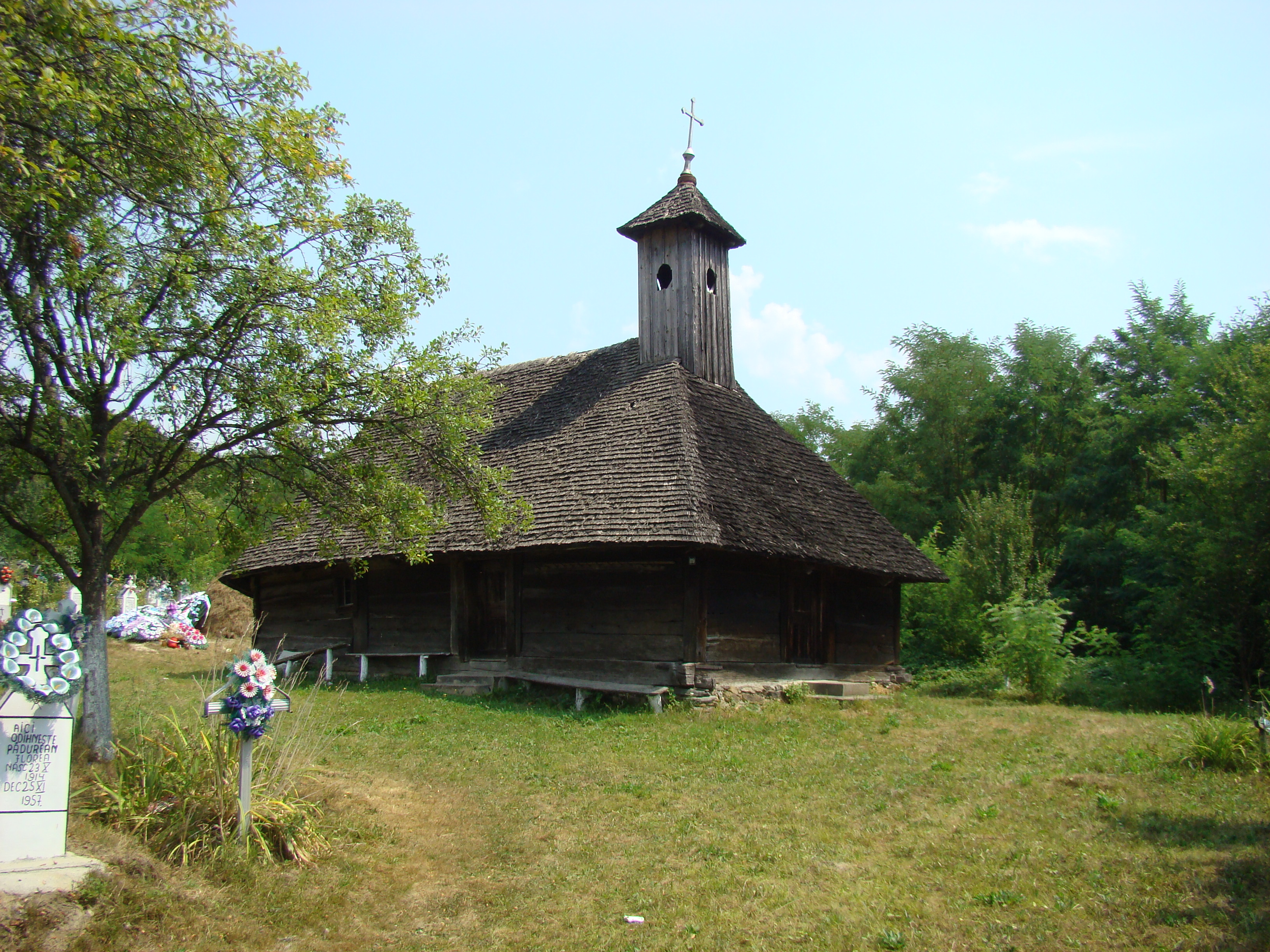
Wooden church in Jupânești

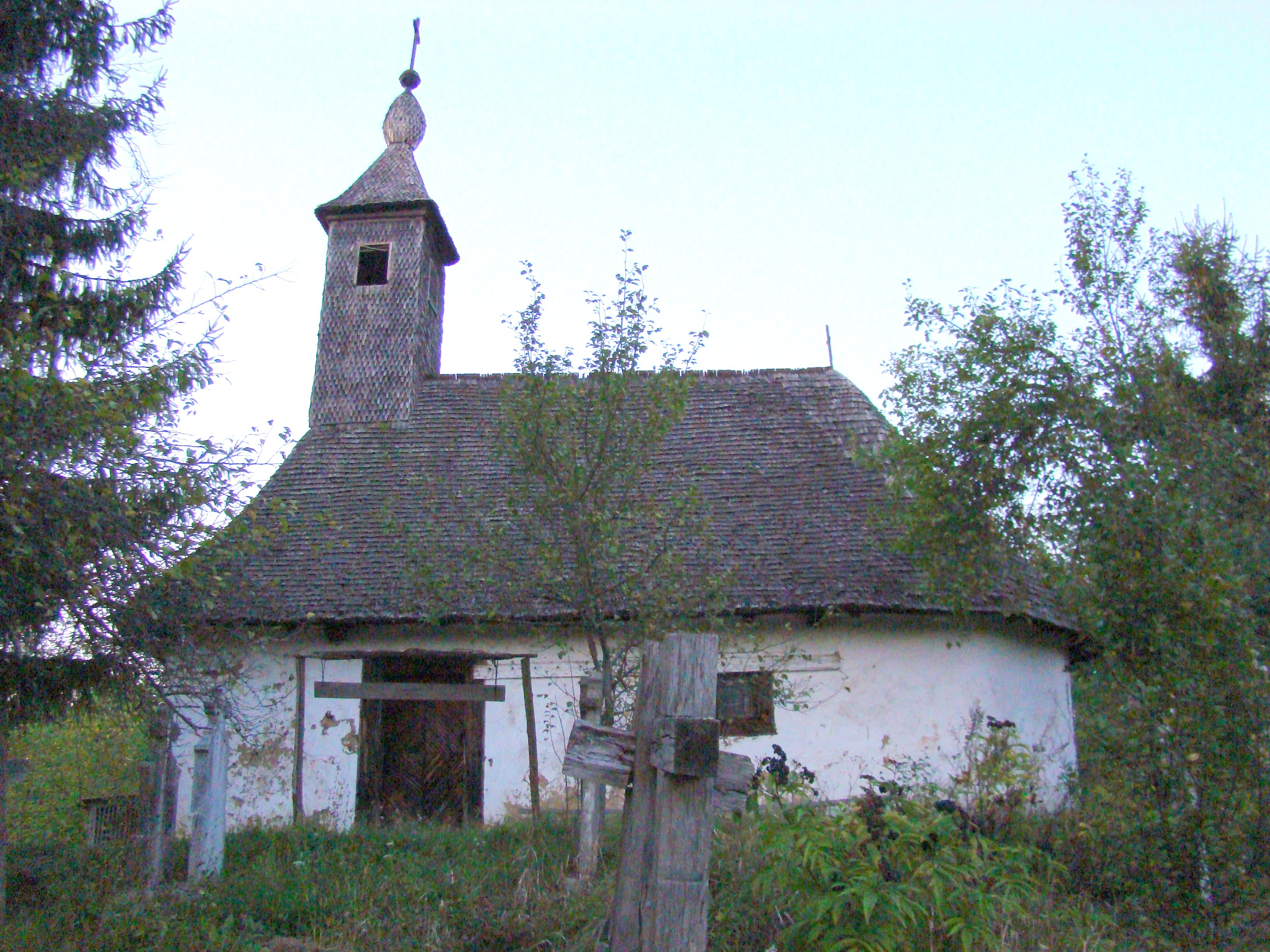
Wooden church in Povârgina
