= Carska Bara =

Largest individual bog in Serbia

- Царска бара (Serbian)
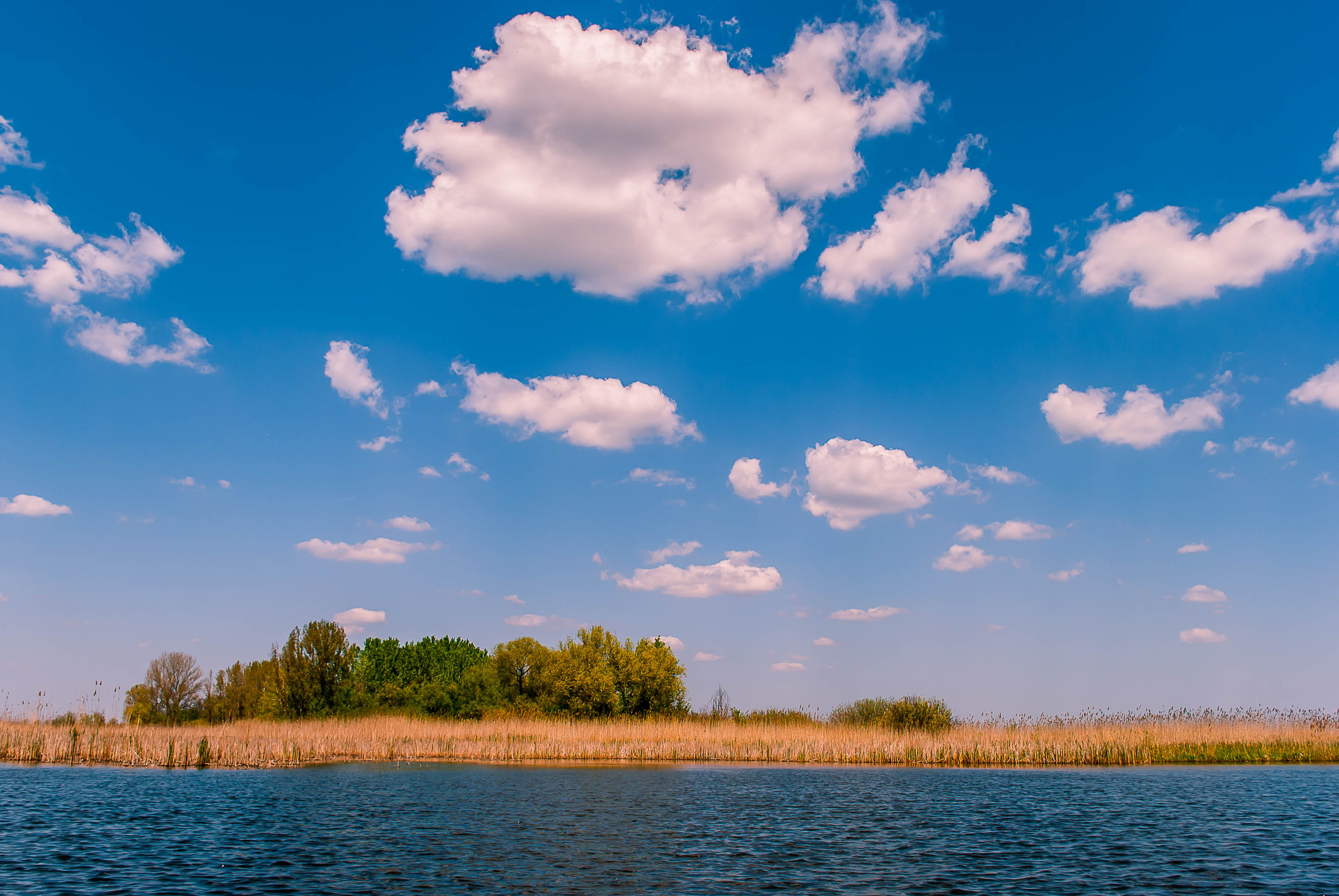
- Carska Bara

- Location within Serbia
- Location: Zrenjanin, Serbia
- Coordinates: 45.263°N 20.399°E
- Etymology: Imperial pond
- Basin countries: Serbia
- Max. length: 9 km (5.6 mi)
- Surface area: 4,726 ha (11,680 acres)

Ramsar Wetland
- Official name: Stari Begej - Carska Bara Special Nature Reserve
- Designated: 14 March 1996
- Reference no.: 819

Carska Bara (Serbian Cyrillic: Царска Бара, lit. 'Imperial Pond') is the largest individual bog in Serbia, in the municipality of Zrenjanin. Along with the neighboring pond of Stari Begej (old arm of the Begej river) it forms the Special nature reserve "Carska Bara" (Специјални резерват природе "Царска бара").

== Location ==
Carska Bara is 17 kilometers south of the town of Zrenjanin, in the west-central part of the Serbian section of Banat, near the mouth of the river Begej into the Tisa. The southern border is bounded by the final, navigable section of the Begej before it empties into the Tisa (followed by the Belgrade-Zrenjanin road), while to the north are the vast Ečka fishponds, the largest in Serbia and second largest in Europe. Entire bog belongs to the municipality of Zrenjanin.

== Settlements and human history ==
Even though it is in the triangle of large cities Belgrade-Novi Sad-Zrenjanin (largest cities in Serbia, Vojvodina and Serbian Banat, respectively), all settlements in the vicinity of Carska bara are smaller ones, ranging from 1,500 to 6,000 inhabitants. The closest settlements are Perlez, in southern corner, on the Begej, and Belo Blato, east of the bog, on the southern shore of Ečka fishpond. In the north are the villages of Lukino Selo, Ečka and Stajićevo, while Knićanin is southwest of it. Town of Titel is right across the bridge on the Tisa. Gallery of the painting colony of "Ečka" is located on the northern tip of the bog.

Human history in the area surrounding Carska bara goes back to 4,000 years BC, with uncovered mounds near Mužlja (Batka) and Titel (Kalvarija). According to legend, the bog (carska bara, Serbian for "imperial bog"), was named after Attila, king of the Huns, but other sources claim that the bog was named that way because of the Austrian emperors which used to hunt in the area. Count László Lukács owned some land in the area, and often invited members of the Austrian royal family to hunt. Among them were princes Rudolf and Franz Ferdinand.

== Geography ==
The entire, physically connected wetland of Carska Bara covers an area of 11 km^{2} (4.2 sq mi) and the entire system consists of three ponds (Carska, Perleska and Tiganjica) connected by the 8 km (5.0 mi) long canal of Old Begej (Stari Begej), a former distributary of the Begej river. It extends 9 km (5.6 mi) along the Begej (approximately from its 4 to 15 km (2.5 to 9.3 mi)). Until 1964, the Old Begej was regular part of the Bega river, navigable, naturally flowing river. That year, the digging of a new Bega canal began, which became part of the cast Danube–Tisa–Danube Canal system. Former river became an oxbow lake, named Old Begej and in time became muddy and marshy.

Wetland consists of many smaller bodies of water: rivers, canals, lakes and ponds, covered with reed beds, willow thickets and rushes and it is known for its color diversity. The central, lake section is known for its blue, clear water, while the surrounding salt marshes have white and yellow waters, all within green woods. Previously, Carska Bara consisted of smaller and larger swamps, but in time it basically turned into a complex of Begej's meanders which are naturally getting shortened and narrowed and the bog gets more and more inclined compared to the river bed.

The Begej river is 2 to 3 m (6 ft 7 in to 9 ft 10 in) deep in this area, while the bog itself is only 80 cm (31 in) deep.

== Biology ==
=== Flora ===
Some areas of water are covered in pond algae. Many rare and autochthonous plants live in the wetland, but also many imported ones. Some representatives of the water plants include water fern, European white water lily, yellow water lily, lax-flowered orchid. Meadow plants are represented by Plumbago, Achillea, wormwood, mallow and meadow sage, and marsh plants by flowering rush, yellow flag iris, water mannagrass, common sweet flag, bulrush, reed, etc.

Altogether, there are some 500 plant species registered in the reserve, including rare species, like yellow pheasant's eye, buttercup, marsh orchid, early marsh-orchid and mare's-tail. The colonies of old willow groves are preserved, so as the forests of the black poplar and narrow-leafed ash. There are rare specimens of pedunculate oak. Once abundant, the oak was heavily cut, but its number began to grow after the area was protected in 1955.

The main invasive species is the water caltrop. It anchors to the bottom of the ponds with its spikes and grows extremely fast, draining large amounts of oxygen from the water. The avoid the massive dying of the fish, the plant is being regularly cut from the bottom.

Five species of plants are on the Serbian red list of endangered species: yellow floating heart, Camphorosma annua, aquatic bladderwort, St John's wort, and saltmarsh thistle which is on the wider, European red list.

=== Fauna ===
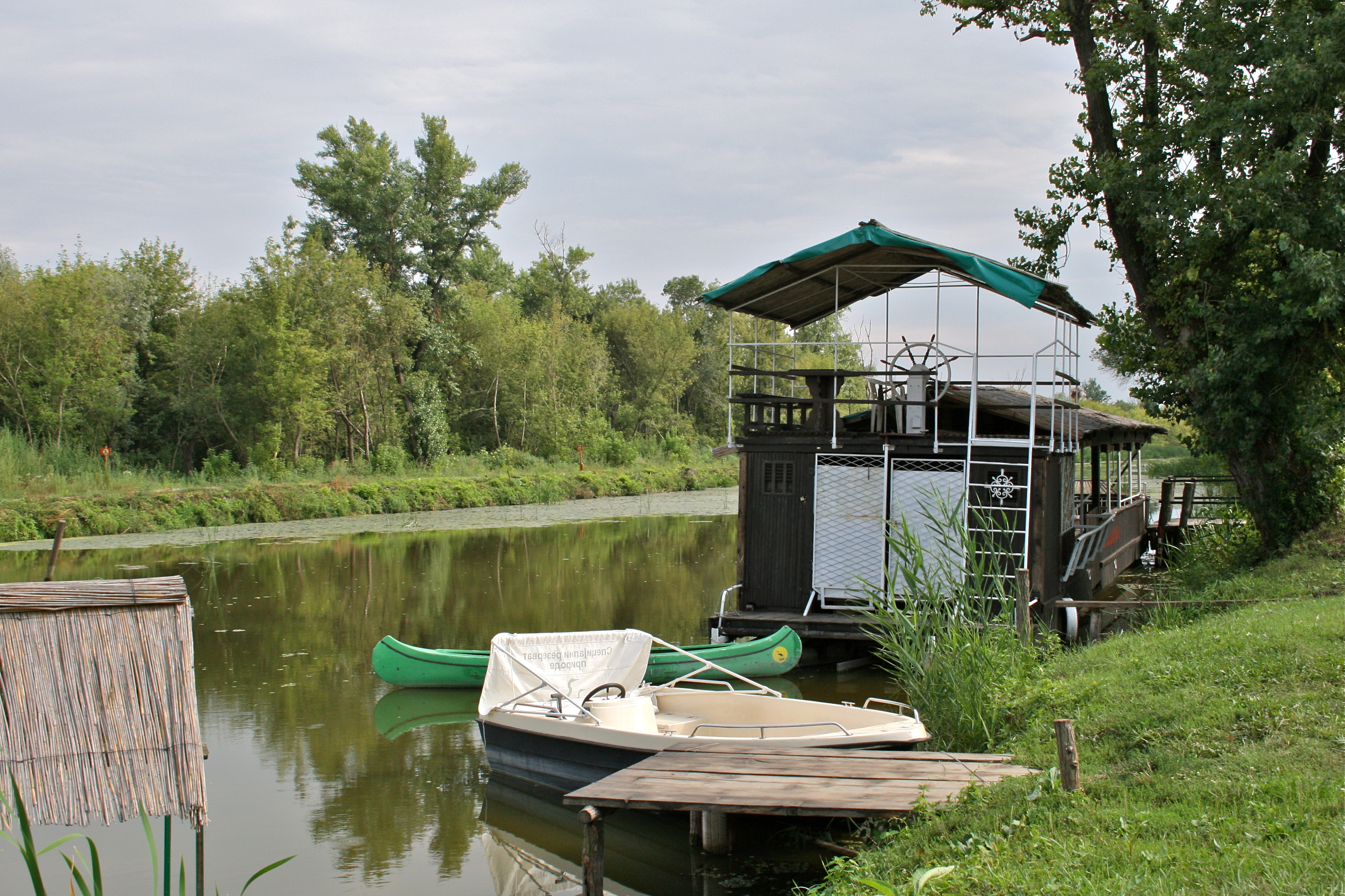
Flat-bottomed boats on the Old Begej

In Carska Bara and nearby Begej river there are 24 different species of fish. The muddy waters are ideal for northern pike. There are also colonies of zanders, which thrives in different waters (clearer, rocky, sandy). They remained from the period before 1964, when the Old Begej was a "live river", used for navigation. After being transformed into the oxbow lake, the population of zander remained in it, adapting to the new environment.

Amphibians (fire salamander, edible frog) and reptiles (sand lizard, European pond terrapin) are also abundant. Despite being a marshland, in Carska Bara there is a noticeable absence of mosquitos which local biologists attribute to the large number of frogs. Both frogs and tadpoles are feasting of mosquito larvae, while those who manage to hatch are prayed upon by the frogs and 18 species of dragonflies.

There are also numerous frogs and snakes (grass snake, etc.). Terrapins are strictly protected and considered the "cleaners" of the bog, as none of the other animals (birds, snakes) are not eating dead fish.

Carska Bara is the best known for its abundant bird life, the first ornithological exploration of which began in the late 19th century. There are 240 bird species recorded in the area. There are thriving colonies of herons (grey heron, little egret, black-crowned night heron) and cormorants (including pygmy cormorant). Other species include buzzards, Eurasian sparrowhawks, common spoonbills, western marsh harrier, Montagu's harrier, red-breasted goose, osprey, greylag goose, stork, woodcock, grebe, Eurasian bittern, auk, European bee-eater, and common redstart. Some 110 bird species are migratory.

Herons are considered the most important for the ecosystem. They nest in large colonies which are periodically moved from one locality within the reserve to another, based on the abundance of fish and its successful spawning. The number of herons vary greatly from season to season. By the late 20th century, their number differed from several hundred nests to over 10,000. All 10 species of herons living in Serbia can be found in Carska Bara, so herons became a symbol of the wetland. Some 50,000 greater white-fronted geese spend December-January each year in Carska Bara on their voyage from Siberia to the South Europe, via the Carpathian Mountains.

Other birds include whiskered tern, rails, swans, white-tailed eagles, ferruginous ducks, 8 species of herons, gulls and pelicans, while the cormorant colonies have 3,000 members. It is suggested that such a large number of birds actually prevents the bog from freezing during the winter. Swans in the reserve show aggressive behavior, attacking nests of all other birds, except for the migratory greater white-fronted geese.

Numerous birds, including kingfishers and cormorants, try to feed on the nearby Ečka fishponds. Cormorants especially reduce the fish population, so the birds are being chased away from the fishponds with the gas cannons. It was estimated that cormorants alone would eat over two tons of fish daily, if not chased away. The cormorants colony in Carska Bara has been described as the "horror movie set", with the trees dried from their droppings, with the strong smell of ammonia spreading around.

White-tailed eagles are on top of the food chain in the wetland. They are also the largest birds, with a wingspan of 2.5 m (8 ft 2 in) and weight of 7.5 kg (17 lb). They are known to pray on herons. In 2022, osprey and snake eagle were spotted in the reserve.

Variety of mammals include otters, European ground squirrel, wildcats, bank vole and also wild hog, roe deer, red fox, European brown hare, muskrat, bats, hedgehog, mole, weasel, hamster, European polecat, etc. The otters are under the strict protection. Wild hogs are also protected but in time their number greatly increased as they have no natural enemies in Carska Bara. They began to roam outside of the reserve, greatly damaging crops, especially in Belo Blato village. Residents sued the state for damages but lost. Instead, the state granted them permission to kill a quota of animals, if caught in their fields.

== Nature Reserve ==
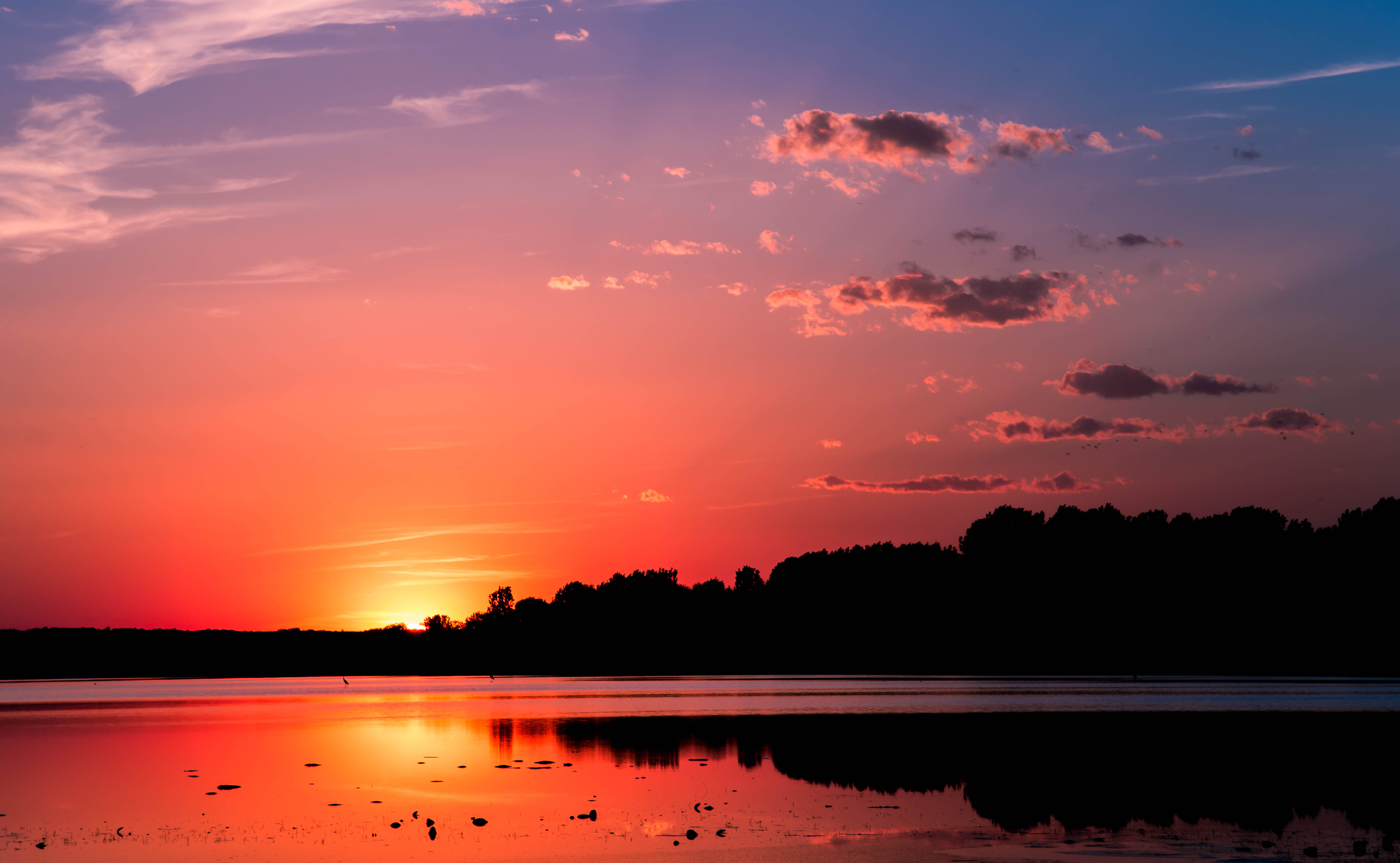
Sunset

Special Nature Reserve "Carska Bara" was proclaimed in 1955, with its status revised in 1995. It covers an area of 16.76 km^{2} (6.47 sq mi), wider than Carska Bara itself. It was declared a Ramsar site on March 25, 1996. Fish farm "Еčka" was appointed by Decree of the government of Republic of Serbia to act as an administrator and manager of Special Nature Reserve "Carska Bara" ("Official Gazette RS" No 56/94, 86/05 and 46/2011). The Ramsar protected area includes the oxbow lake Old Begej and the all three ponds: Tiganjica, Perleska, Carska, covering an area of 4,726 ha (11,680 acres).

The pond was declared an Important Bird Area in 1989, and later a part of the Emerald network.

Hotel "Sibila" was open at the entrance into the reserve. The visiting season lasts from May to October and the number of visitors in limited to 15,000 per year. Navigation is forbidden on the ponds, but it is allowed along the Old Begej.

=== Controversies ===
==== Fish ponds ====
Condition of the reserve gradually worsened since 2001. Fish farm "Еčka" was privatized and sold to the "Mirotin" company from Vrbas, and the maintenance of the reserve stopped almost immediately. Additionally, the fish ponds of "Еčka“ extends directly to the north from the Carska Bara and are considered the greatest polluters of the bog. City of Zrenjanin formed a special ecological institute "Natural reserves" and since 2014 has been asking the state government to change the decision on the reserve's management, claiming that it is not logical that the greatest polluter administers the reserve, that Vojvodina's provincial government provided funds for the dredging of the canals but that hasn't been done and that managers of the company openly stated that they have neither the experts nor the interest to work on the preservation of the bog. In August 2017 the touristic cruise by the boat on the bog was suspended as the canals got filled with silt, due to the lack of maintenance, which prevents the navigation.

"Еčka" disputed the claims, alleging that they take care of the reserve, maintain it properly and feed the pond with the fresh water from their fish ponds and pumping it from the Tisza, which is some 25 km (16 mi) to the west. They also claim that the boating is temporarily closed due to the low water level caused by the big drought of 2017. Local environmentalists maintain that the drought is not the only reason. They claim that fishpond, though obliged by the law, doesn't monitor the oscillations of the water. In spring, the fishpond should fill the Carska Bara with the fresh water, allowing for the spawning to occur, but they don't do that. However, during fall, they discharge the polluted wastewater into the pond. By this, they reduce the spawning, block the natural fluctuation of the water and fills the pond with mud. That way, the delicate flora and fauna change quickly, rapidly dying out.

In August 2019, local environmentalist groups asked again for the change of the caretaker of the reserve as, after two decades of neglect, the situation is bad and only getting worse. The private owner of the fish ponds is also given the task of maintaining of the reserve by the state. As the reserve is being buried under the silt and sludge, in the near future Carska Bara will transform from wetland into steppe. The Stari Begej is already not navigable during a dry season, the only confirmed nesting ground of wild geese is destroyed, the reed and willows are already growing on the deposited silt, while some 50 bird species moved out of the reserve.

There is also a problem with the local population and attempts at illegal fishing in the reserve, as the fishing is forbidden. The caretaker significantly reduced number of rangers. However, sports fishing (e.g., fish has to be returned back in the water) is allowed in the section called "Tractor pond" within the reserve, while the fishing is allowed in the fish pond's sections Sent Andreja and Joca ("the best pike area in Europe").

==== 2018 fire ====
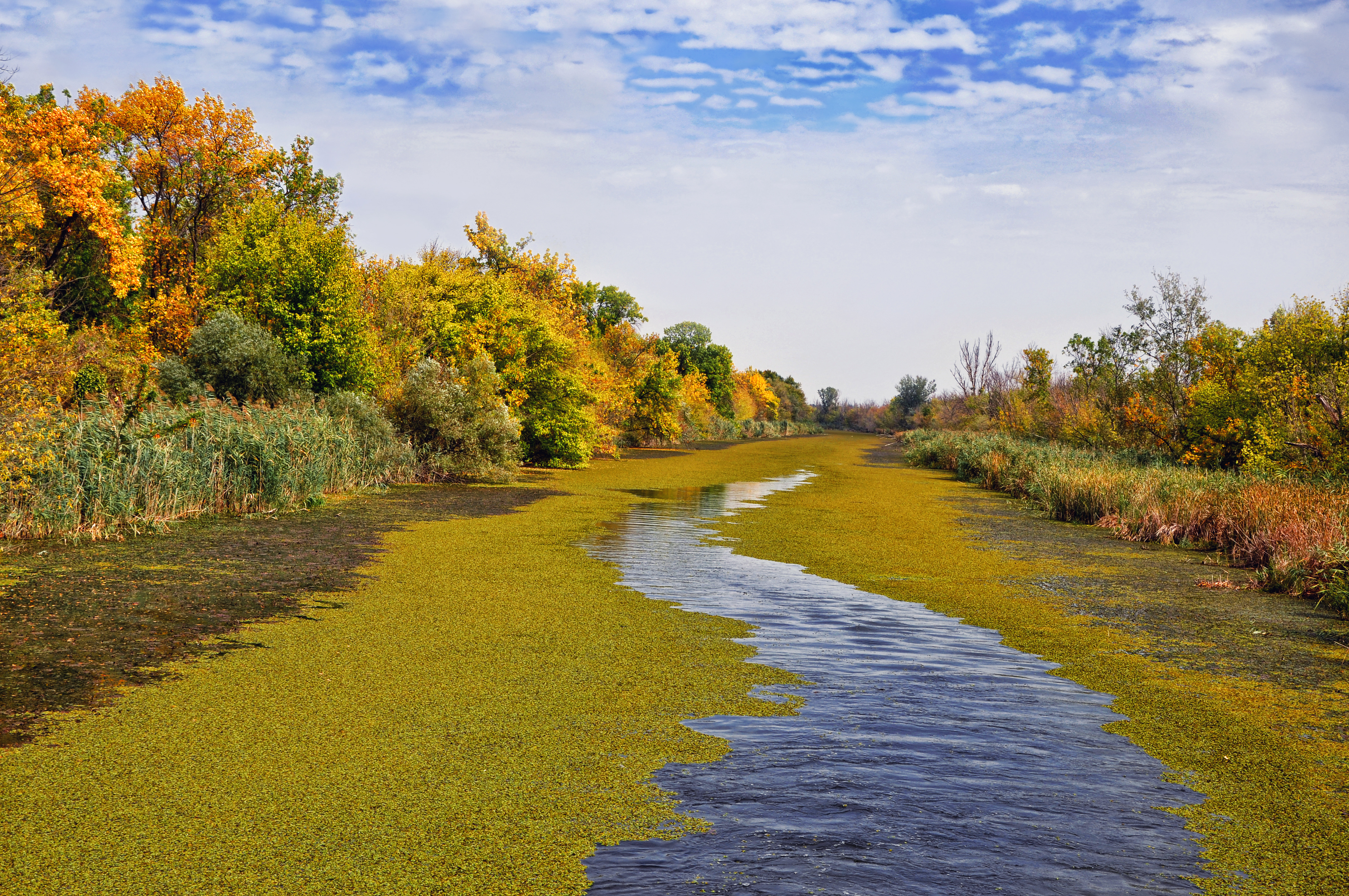
Carska Bara landscape

Caused by stubble burning set on 14 October 2018, which is prohibited but fairly common at the end of the harvesting season, a massive fire broke out on 15 October fuelled by the strong wind. It spread to 800 ha (2,000 acres) when reeds, grass and undergrowth along the Bega river were caught by fire. The most heavily affected was the Tiganjica section. Though the fire was extinguished by 16 October, with continuous smoldering in the next days, several hundred of hectares of the reserve were burned.

There was no concern for the bird life, though, as most of the migratory birds already moved out, and also there were no chicks because of the late season. The only scenic lookout in the reserve, which was made of wood, was burned to the ground. An 81-year old man was later arrested for causing the fire. Minister of Environmental Protection Goran Trivan said that in the end a total of 805 ha (1,990 acres) of the reserve was caught by fire. He added that there are some artificial ways of revitalizing the damaged terrain. Only in 2022 the area began to visibly recover and birds returned in greater number.

=== 2020s ===
After almost 30 years of power wrestling between the environmentalists and authorities, the legal status of the reserve was changed in 2022, and the "Natural Reserves" institute from Zrenjanin became a caretaker. The institute was formed specifically to administer the reserve. This allowed the revitalization of the area, which degraded in time. Parts of the reserve became "significantly degraded", Tiganjica pond dried out, while Perleska pond reduced to 30% of its original size. Plans include dredging of the Old Bega river on its entire course, so it will become navigable for touristic boats again. The water pumps for extinguishing further fires were placed through the reserve. Discharging of the wastewater from the fishponds was aborted, though it would take several years for the ecosystem to revitalize, and the ranger service was enhanced. Construction of the system of scenic viewpoints, observation towers, children's playgrounds and touristic facilities will start in 2022.
