= Ečka fish pond =

- Рибњак Ечка (Serbian)
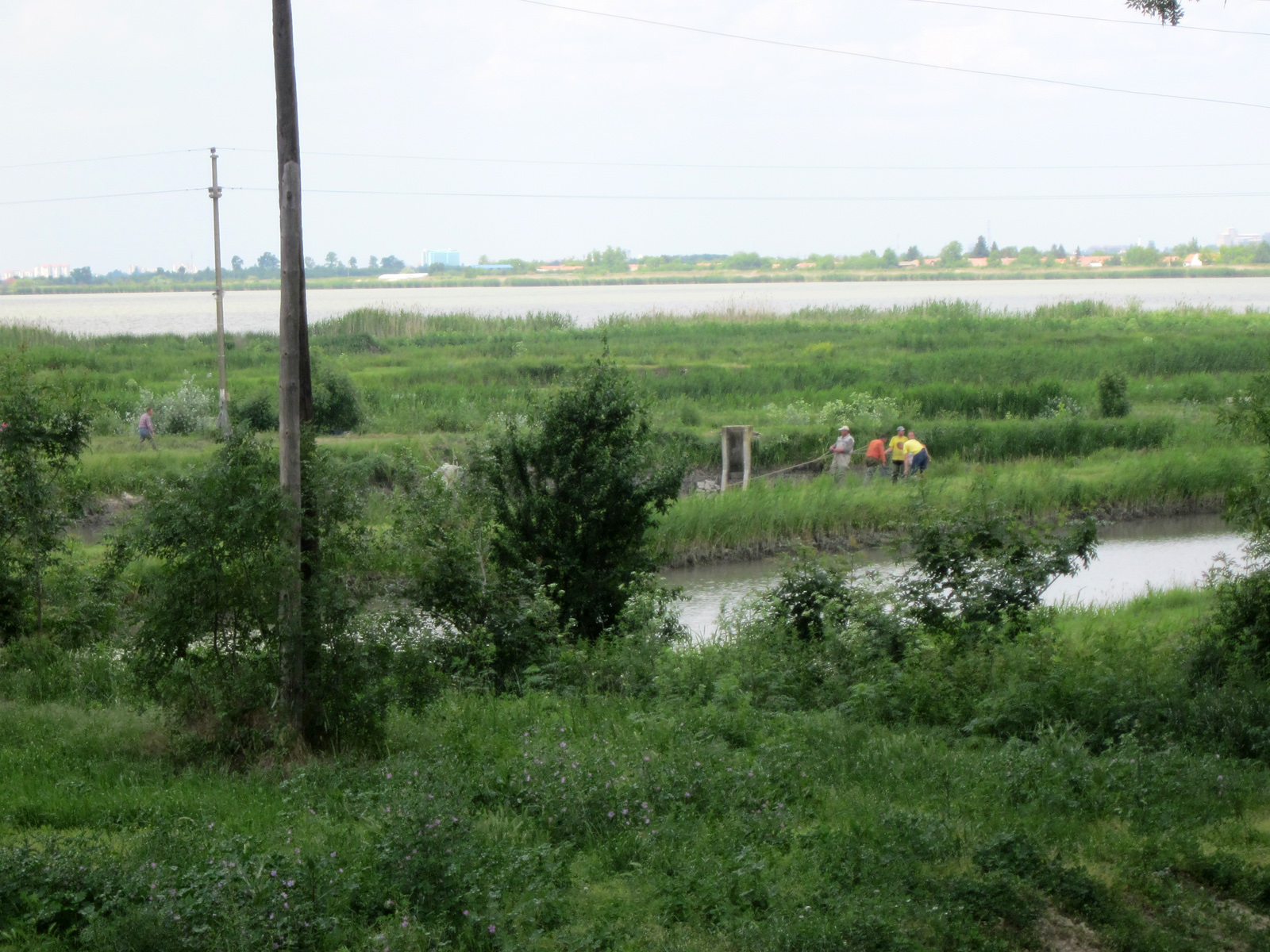

- Location within Vojvodina
- Location: Western Banat, Vojvodina, Serbia
- Coordinates: 45.286124°N 20.417637°E
- Type: Fluvial
- Max. length: 10 kilometres (6.2 mi)
- Max. width: 1 kilometre (0.62 mi)
- Surface area: 15.42 square kilometres (5.95 sq mi)
- Average depth: 1.33 metres (4 ft 4 in)

The Ečka fish pond (Serbian Cyrillic: Рибњак Ечка, romanized: Ribnjak Ečka) is the largest fish pond in Serbia and among the largest in Europe. It is located in the plains of western Banat region, near the confluence of the Begej river into the Tisa, south of the city of Zrenjanin. It is a complex system of lakes separated by embankments. Four lakes: Belo jezero, Koča jezero, Mika jezero and Joca jezero make up over 80% of the total water area, while the remainder consists of smaller pools for fish production. It is named after the large village of Ečka to the north, but smaller villages of Lukino Selo and Belo Blato lie directly on its shores.

The lakes occupy the total area of around 15.42 km^{2}, which makes them together the third-largest lake in Serbia, after two hydroelectric lakes of Đerdap. Fish production is performed on around 1,700 hectares (4,200 acres), and the annual output amounts to up to 6,000 tons of fish, chiefly carp. The water area which is not used for commercial production is available for recreational fishing.

== Geography ==
Map of the pond and surrounding area

Ečka fish pond is located in western Banat region, some 10 km south of the city of Zrenjanin, and is entirely contained within its administrative territory. The lake system runs in general northeast-southwest direction, in total length of about 10 km, parallel to the regulated flow of the Begej. The maximal width is around 1 km at Belo jezero, and the total area of the lakes is 15.42 km^{2} (21.57 km^{2} according to another source). The system consists of 46 lakes and reservoirs, the four major ones being, from east to west, Belo jezero (4.59 km^{2}), Koča jezero (2.59 km^{2}), Mika jezero (1.88 km^{2}) and Joca jezero (3.72 km^{2}). The lakes are shallow, the deepest being Belo jezero with an average depth 1.33 m; lakes to the west morph into marshes, with Joca jezero having average depth of just 0.77 m.

Village of Belo Blato is located at the southern shore of Koča jezero, and Lukino Selo is on the eastern shore of Belo jezero; village of Ečka lies further east, on the opposite side of the Begej.

The main fishery building and hotel "Sibila" are located on the southern shore of Belo jezero. They are accessible from a road running on an embankment, connected with the main Zrenjanin–Belgrade road. Entrance to the special nature reserve Carska bara, a system of wetlands which lies between the fish pond and final section of the Begej, is located across the road.

== History ==
The "Lazarus' map", dated early 16th century and preserved in the National Széchényi Library in Budapest, depicts the vast wetlands around the final sections of the Begej and Tamiš rivers near their confluences into the Tisa. According to the historical records from the 16th century, fishing permits were issued for the "White marsh" (Bela močvara), a wetland around the final section of the Begej river.

Extensive works on regulation of the marshy area began in the 19th century, under the rule of Austria-Hungary in the area. In 1806, final section of the Begej was moved south of the marshes, into an artificially built canal with shorelines made of wattle. However, for the most part of the 19th century the canal was left neglected, but in 1900 it was revived by building new dams and locks.

== Fish production ==
Company "Ečka a.d." is the sole user of the fish pond. Fish production is performed on around 1,700 hectares (4,200 acres), chiefly in smaller reservoirs separated from the main lake system. Common carp is the primary output, making up around 90% of total production, and smaller amounts of grass carp (amur), bighead carp (tolstolobik), zander (smuđ) and wels catfish make up the remainder. Carp is cultivated up to three years of age, with individuals reaching 3 to 4 kilograms (7 to 9 lb). It is captured in late autumn and put on the markets of Serbia, Macedonia and Bosnia and Herzegovina. The peak output corresponds with the Orthodox Nativity Fast period, and almost half of the annual production is sold in the week preceding the common slava (family holiday) of Saint Nicholas (19 December). The carp of Ečka (Ečanski šaran) is a registered geographical indication with the Intellectual Property Office of the Republic of Serbia.

Apart from the Ečka fish pond, the company also owns smaller fisheries in Melenci, Srpski Itebej and Čenta, all from the Banat region.

== See also ==
- Carska bara
