= Lukino Selo =

Lukino Selo Лукино Село (Serbian) Lukácsfalva (Hungarian)
- Village (Selo)
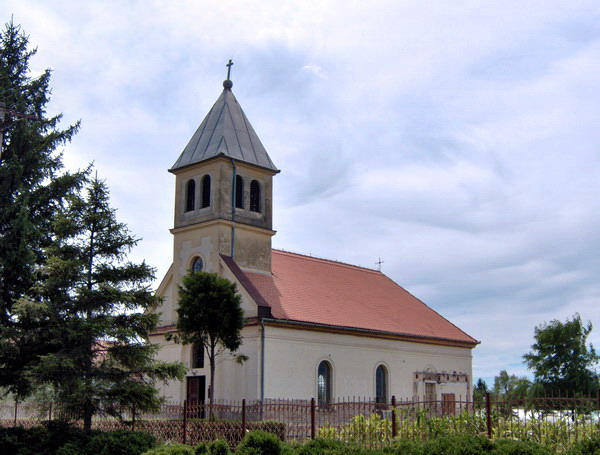
- The Catholic Church

- Location within Serbia Lukino Selo (Serbia) Lukino Selo (Europe)
- Coordinates: 45°18′07″N 20°25′19″E
- Country: Serbia
- Province: Vojvodina
- District: Central Banat
- Municipalities: Zrenjanin

Area
  - Lukino Selo: 51.96 km^{2} (20.06 sq mi)
- Elevation: 70 m (230 ft)

Population (2011)
  - Lukino Selo: 498
  - Density: 9.58/km^{2} (24.8/sq mi)
- Time zone: UTC+1 (CET)
  - Summer (DST): UTC+2 (CEST)
- Postal code: 23224
- Area code: +381(0)23
- Car plates: ZR

Lukino Selo (Serbian Cyrillic: Лукино Село, Hungarian: Lukácsfalva, German: Lukasdorf) is a village located in the Zrenjanin municipality, in the Central Banat District of Serbia. It is situated in the Autonomous Province of Vojvodina. The village has a Hungarian ethnic majority (67.56%) and its population numbers 498 people (2011 census).

== Location ==
Lukin Selo is located 11 km (6.8 mi) south of Zrenjanin, its municipal seat, though the southern zone of Zrenjanin, Mužlja, is just to the north. On the northeast and east, the village borders the villages of Ečka and Stajićevo. Belo Blato is to the southwest.

== Geography ==
The village is situated at an altitude of 77 m (253 ft), on the bank terraces in the valley of the Bega river, which flows just 1 km (0.62 mi) to the east. Geographically, the entire region is actually an alluvial plain of the Tisza river, which flows west of the village. The village is located on the northeast shore of the Belo jezero, the ending section of the large Ečka fish pond.

As the elongated atar (village area), is much larger than the settlement itself, it comprises the entire fish pond and reaches the Tisza river of the west. Apart from the Belo, the pond consists of Kopova lakes, several connected lakes (Koča, Mika, Joca), which are part of the old riverbed of the Tisza. Outside of the fish pond complex, there are two smaller bodies of water to the north of the village area - Šuvajka and Novo lakes. The protected wetland of Carska Bara is south of the village. The special nature reserve is the largest individual bog in Serbia.

== History ==
The village was founded in 1785 when Hungarian settlers from neighboring villages such as Ečka, began moving in the area. They were noted as good tobacco farmers. As it was built on the land of the nobleman Count Lazar Lukač, it was named Lukácsfalva after his surname. Lukač, a count from Transylvania but of Armenian origin, encouraged settling in the marshland which surrounded the lakes and rivers, as he needed a workforce for his estate, especially for the vegetable production, as he was also selling the products. Lukač purchased tens of thousands of hectares from the Imperial Court in Vienna. He built Kaštel Ečka in the neighboring village of the same name, a castle which became the cultural and entertainment center of the rich nobility. Lukino Selo, on the other hand, served for the settling of the help, gardeners, farmers, etc.

The Belo lake was created by the denizens, and the formation of a lake from a marsh of the same name lasted for a century. The swamp was deepened and cleaned and soon turned into the fish pond, which was the main economic activity for the villagers. There used to be a mill on the shore of the lake. It was connected to the village via two small stone bridges.

The original settlers were poor and landless peasants. In 1825, some 200 Bulgarian Catholics settled in the village, but they were Hungarized in time. They were brought in order to boost the vegetable production.

== Characteristics ==
Lukino Selo is a typical Pannonian village. The administrative area of the settlement is 51.96 km^{2} (20.06 sq mi). It consists of three parallel streets, stretched in the northwest–southeast direction, with uneven space between them, which are connected by other three short transversal streets. Over 90% of houses still use individual water sources (water wells, etc.). There is a lower grades elementary school and post office in the village.

== Population ==
Historical population
Year	Pop.	±% p.a.
1900	1,018	—
1910	980	−0.38%
1921	743	−2.49%
1931	888	+1.80%
1948	1,007	+0.74%
1953	757	−5.55%
1961	876	+1.84%
1971	722	−1.91%
1981	703	−0.27%
1991	643	−0.89%
2002	598	−0.66%
2011	498	−2.01%

The population has been experiencing a constant depopulation in the past 7 decades. Lukino Selo remains predominantly settled by the Hungarians. There used to be a Romani inhabited section of the village. Their settlement can be traced back to the original settling of the village, in Lazar Lukač's lifetime, but it was abandoned and today there is a meadow where the settlement used to be.

=== Ethnic groups (2002 census) ===
- Hungarians = 404 (67.56%)
- Serbs = 78 (13.04%)
- Yugoslavs = 27 (4.52%)
- Romani = 21 (3.51%)
- others.

== Economy ==
The village is predominantly agricultural. Main agricultural products are corn, wheat, sunflower and tobacco, but the old production of vegetables, namely tomatoes, still survives. For a period, vegetables were the most dominant products. They used to be transported to Belo Blato, where they were loaded onto the boats and transported further by the Bega river. Husbandry was quite developed, but it is also declining today. It includes mostly cattle.

The fishery is also important for the village's economy, especially during its history. Most of the facilities of the Ečka fish pond are located in Lukino Selo, but the fishery complex is named after the much larger village of Ečka.

As of 2018 the overall economy is in a very bad shape. Some of the inhabitants travel to Zrenjanin to work in the Dräxlmaier Group factory. The local community estimated that the population shrunk from 500 in 2011 to 200 in 2018 as a result of Hungarian government's policy of approving papers for all Hungarians living abroad. Many took the opportunity and migrated to the European Union.

== Notable people ==
- Janika Balaž, most famous Serbian tamburitza player, of Romani origin.

== See also ==
- Carska Bara
- List of places in Serbia
- List of cities, towns and villages in Vojvodina

== Sources ==
- Slobodan Ćurčić, Broj stanovnika Vojvodine, Novi Sad, 1996.
