= Jerry Grcevich =

Croatian-American musician (born 1951)

- Born: 1951 (age 74–75); Turtle Creek, Pennsylvania, U.S.
- Genres: Croatian folk
- Occupations: Musician; composer
- Instrument: Tamburitza
- Years active: 1980s–present
- Label: Novi Odlazak
- Member of: Miroslav Škoro; Jerry Grcevich Tamburitza Orchestra; Penn Sembles

Jerry Grcevich (Croatian: Grčević; born 1951) is a Croatian-American folk musician, tamburitza virtuoso, and composer. He is a frontman of the Penn Sembles.

== Biography ==
Grcevic was born in Turtle Creek, Pennsylvania, to a family of Croatian emigrants from Ozalj, Karlovac, and Podravina. He was introduced to the tamburitza by his father and uncle, both tamburica players (with the Sloboda Tamburitza Orchestra), and started playing in his father's orchestra at ten years old. At the age of 21, he traveled to Croatia (then, the Socialist Republic of Croatia) and Vojvodina, where he studied with Janika Balaž in Novi Sad. He also met Zvonko Bogdan, with whom he toured in the U.S. and Canada. Since 1980, he has composed and recorded his own music. As a player of multiple tamburica instruments (bisernica, brač, bugarija, berda, and čelo), he usually plays and records entire albums solo. During the 1980s, Grcevich took multiple ethnomusicological research trips throughout Croatia.

In the late 1980s, he started a collaboration with Miroslav Škoro, which produced his first album, Ne dirajte mi ravnicu. He is co-composer and arranger of Škoro's hits "Moja Juliška" and "Ne dirajte mi ravnicu". Since 1993, Grcevich has had his own group, the Jerry Grcevich Tamburitza Orchestra, which has performed extensively throughout the U.S. and Canada.

In 2005, he was awarded a National Heritage Fellowship by the National Endowment for the Arts for his musical work, especially for performances and cultural cooperation with Irish, Romanian, and Hungarian Americans in Pittsburgh. He also became the first Western-Pennsylvanian artist to receive the award.

== Discography ==
- New Traditions (Novi Odlazak Productions, 1992)
- Croatian Dances Vol.III (self-released, 1997)
- Mila Moja (self-released, 2008)
- Sonya i Jerry, Kao Nekad (self-released, 2011)
- Tamburitza Dance Tonight (self-released, 2013)
