= Music of Vojvodina =

The music of Vojvodina is played by such organizations as the Opera of the Serbian National Theatre, an orchestra, the Tamburitza Orchestra of Radio Television of Vojvodina, Guitarists Association of Vojvodina the National String Orchestra, Zlatna Tamburica, the Association of Serbian Singing Groups, Oj Dunave, Dunave Plavi, the Academy of the Arts in Novi Sad and the Muzička Omladina youth organization.

== Classical music ==
Since at least the 19th century, Vojvodina has had a vibrant choral tradition. Some of the best-known choruses include "Koča Kolarov" (from Zrenjanin), and "Isidora Sekulić" (from Novi Sad).

Vojvodina has produced a well-known composer in Josif Marinković (1851–1931) from Vranjevo. He wrote Romantic-influenced pieces for choruses with accompaniment by a piano, as well as hymns and theatrical music. Marinković used some elements of Serbian folk music in these compositions. Another composer from Vojvodina was Isidor Bajić, who also studied the area's folk music and founded the Serbian Music Magazine.

Modern musicians from Vojvodina include Pera Petrović, a violinist and singer.

== Traditional music ==
The traditional music of Vojvodina forms a kind of continuum with the folk music of Romania in the east, the folk music of Hungary in the north, the folk music of Slavonia (Croatia) in the west, and the folk music of Central Serbia in the south. There is also some difference between the traditional music in various parts of Vojvodina, as well as the difference between the music of various ethnic groups in the region.

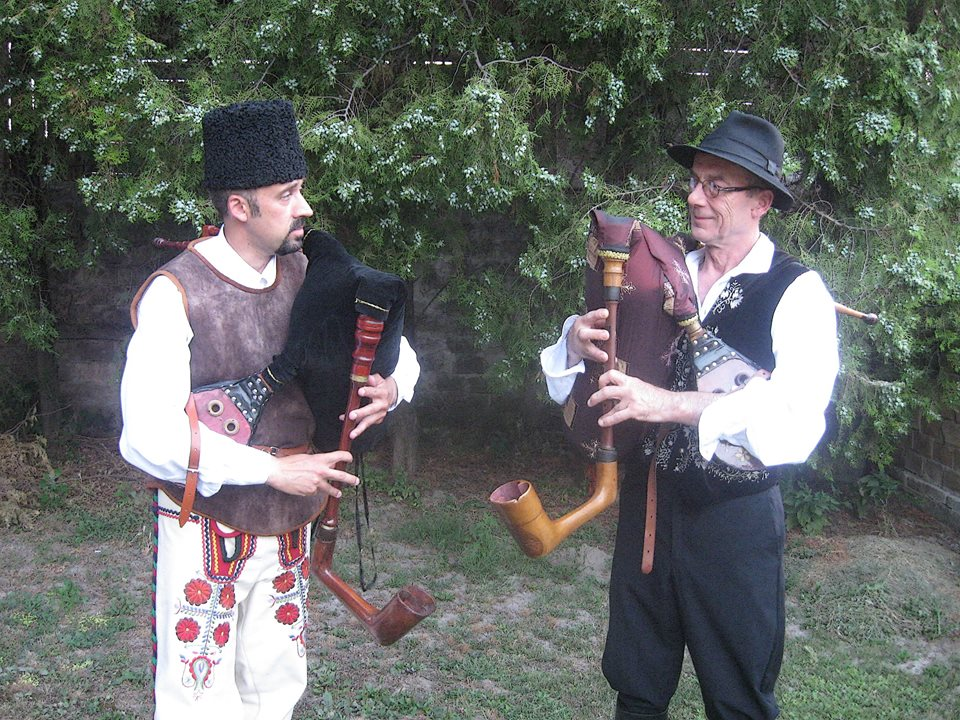
Gaida duo.

Traditional music of Vojvodina is to a large extent associated with small tamburitza (tamburica) and string orchestras. The format of orchestra varies; in the most common form, it usually has one or two tamburitzas, a violin, a guitar and a contrabass (colloquially referred to as "begeš"); sometimes it also includes an accordion. Such orchestras are, somewhat archaically, called bandas (bande). There are also orchestras consisting only of tambourines; their repertoire is, however, somewhat limited to more gentle songs.

The most renowned tamburitza orchestra was the one of late Janika Balázs. Singer and composer Zvonko Bogdan is the most popular performer throughout.

Modern violinist Félix Lajkó based his jazz-like opus on a broad spectrum of influences from the music of Pannonian plain, including Hungarian, Vojvodinian and Romani music.

== Pop and rock ==
The "golden era" of pop and rock in Vojvodina, as elsewhere in Serbia were 1980s, when the new wave explosion launched several excellent bands. The most relevant bands from that period were short-living but influential punkers Pekinška patka, pop experimentists Laboratorija zvuka and arty La strada led by Slobodan Tišma. In the 1990s, the most outstanding bands were Obojeni program and Love Hunters from Novi Sad. In the late 1990s and 2000s, a stream of pop bands also gained limited popularity (Oružjem protivu otmičara, Zbogom Brus Li, Instant karma).

Singer-songwriter Đorđe Balašević, however, remains the most outstanding figure of modern popular music in Vojvodina. His career has lasted since 1977 to present days.

== Folk music ==
During the 1990s the popular music in Serbia and Vojvodina became the so-called "new-composed folk music" (turbo-folk), with the influences from the oriental music such as Turkish or Greek music. Popular folk music singers from Vojvodina include Dara Bubamara, Miloš Bojanić and Boža Nikolić.

== See also ==
- Music of Serbia
