= Church of St. Nicholas, Ečka =

Church of St. Nicholas
- Crkva svetog Nikole; Црква светог Николе
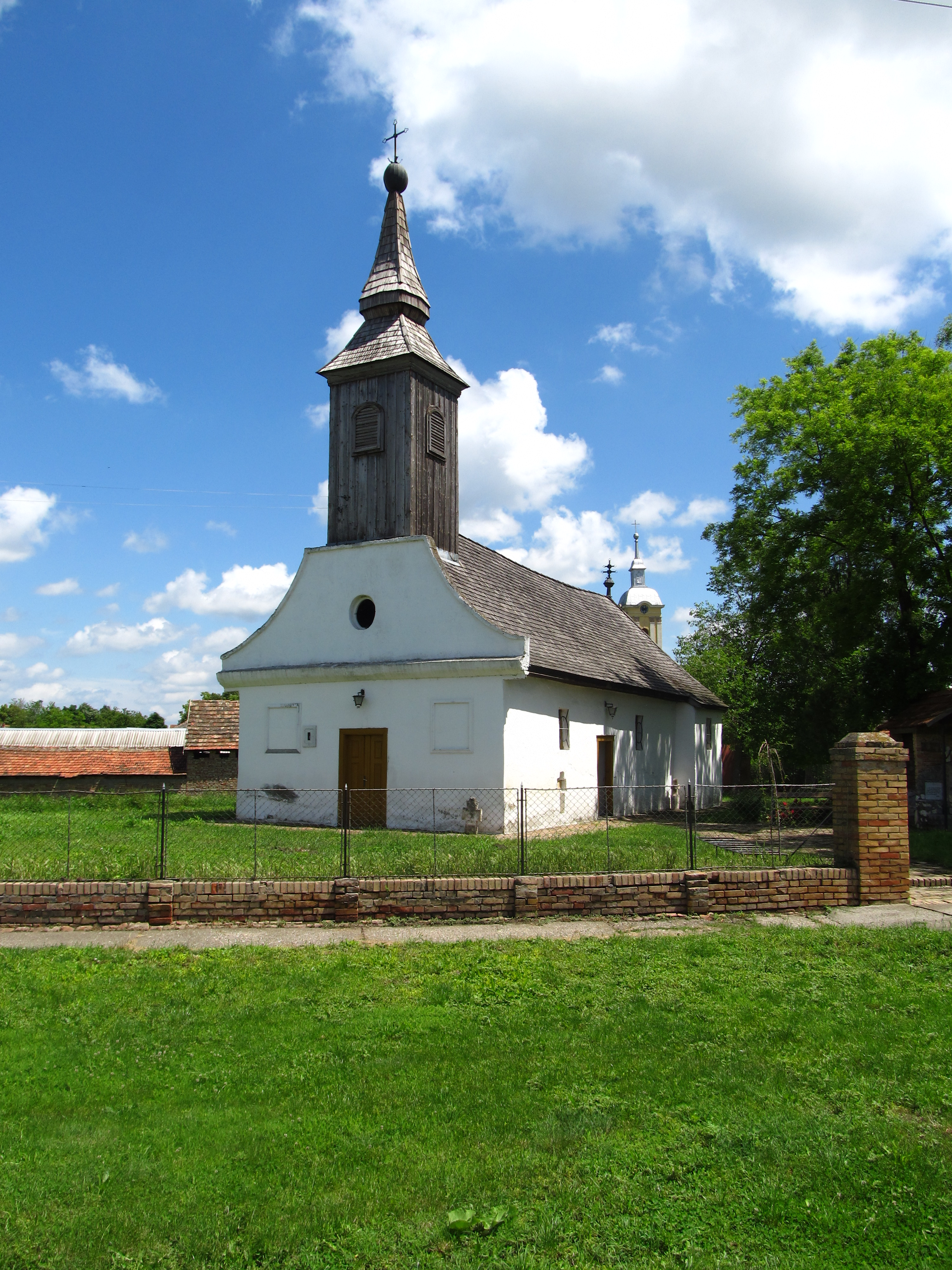
- Church of St Nicholas
- Church of St. Nicholas
- 45°18′59″N 20°26′12″E
- Location: Ečka, Vojvodina

Cultural Heritage of Serbia
- Type: Cultural Monument of Great Importance
- Designated: 1995
- Reference no.: СК 1102
- Country: Serbia
- Denomination: Serbian Orthodox

History
- Status: Church
- Dedication: St. Nicholas

Architecture
- Functional status: Active
- Years built: 1711

Administration
- Archdiocese: Eparchy of Banat

The Church of St. Nicholas (Serbian: Црква светог Николе) in Ečka is Serbian Orthodox church in Vojvodina, Serbia.

== History ==
The church was built in 1711 following the 1690 Great Migration of the Serbs. Iconostasis, painted by Teodor Popović, was likely completed in 1786. The old iconostasis, dating from 1744 and the work of Nedeljko Popović Šerban, is now housed in the National Museum of Zrenjanin. In 1883, the church underwent a full renovation, and a third bell was added. A smaller restoration in 1923 included roof repairs and replacing worn-out shingles. On February 11, 1948, the church was designated a protected cultural monument. Between 1960 and 1963, the iconostasis was restored by Russian restorers Jelena Vandrovskaya and Maria Malakhova. In 2011, the Institute for the Protection of Cultural Monuments in Zrenjanin developed a conservation and restoration project for the church's renovation. In 2020, investigative work was carried out to address moisture damage in the church walls.

== Protection ==
The Church of St. Nicholas in Ečka has been under cultural protection since 1948. It was officially registered as a cultural monument of great significance on February 24, 1995, under entry number SK 1102 in the central register. The initial protection was based on Decision No. 216/48, issued on February 21, 1948, by the Institute for the Protection and Scientific Study of Cultural Monuments of the People's Republic of Serbia. Its categorization was later confirmed in the Official Gazette of AP Vojvodina No. 28/91.

== See also ==
- Eparchy of Banat
