= Zvonko Bogdan =

Seriban-Bunjevac folk singer (born 1942)

Zvonko Bogdan Звонко Богдан
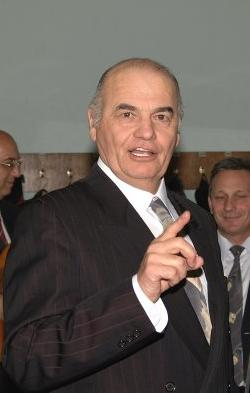
- Zvonko Bogdan in Pljevlja, 2006, at the Youth Festival of String Instruments

Background information
- Born: Zvonimir Bogdan; 5 January 1942 (age 84); Zombor, Kingdom of Hungary (today Sombor, Serbia)
- Origin: Vojvodina, Serbia
- Genres: Tamburitza; Folk music
- Occupations: Singer, songwriter
- Instrument: vocals
- Years active: 1971–present

Zvonimir "Zvonko" Bogdan (Serbian Cyrillic: Звонимир "Звонко" Богдан; born 5 January 1942) is a Serbian Bunjevac performer of traditional folk songs of Serbia, Croatia, Hungary and Romania. He is also a composer, wine producer and harness racer.

== Biography ==
He was born in the town of Sombor (present-day Vojvodina, Serbia) during World War II to a Bunjevac family, when that part of Yugoslavia was under Axis Hungarian occupation. He spent his childhood on the salaš (farm) of his maternal grandfather Stipan Kukuruzar; his other grandfather Franja was a coachman, tamburitza musician and bon viveur. After a brief adventure in local Sombor theatre, he headed for Belgrade, in age of 19, to enter the drama academy, and started singing in Belgrade kafanas to earn for living, and he found himself in this job. The engagement in Belgrade's Union hotel, meeting place of numerous journalists and bohemes, boosted his career; for almost 30 years, he would sing in Union whenever he visited Belgrade. His first solo concert was held at Kalemegdan terrace. In 1971, he recorded "Ej salaši na severu Bačke" (Hey Salašes in the North of Bačka), the song he would be forever remembered for. From 1972, he performed with Janika Balaž's orchestra on Novi Sad's Petrovaradin Fortress, a hallmark of tamburitza music.

During the turbulent 1990s and Yugoslav Wars, Bogdan largely withdrew from public performances. As he explained, "Simply, I wasn't in a mood to work. Also, the piracy took so much momentum that I was sick even of thoughts of composing and music... I hope those ugly times have gone and that we would be able to live like humans again".

In 2004, Bogdan performed in Novi Sad for the Exit Festival, mostly devoted to pop and rock, also held on Petrovaradin Fortress; it was a tribute of new generations to the old bard and the site which was the cornerstone of traditional music.

Bogdan sings both the original and also the traditional songs of Vojvodina and Slavonia accompanied by the traditional tamburitza orchestra. Some of the songs he composed himself, including his most famous "Ej salaši na severu Bačke". Some of his songs are also in Hungarian and RomaniAccompanying bands on his concerts are the Orchestra of Mile Nikolić (the successor of the famous Orchestra of Janika Balaž) from Vojvodina and the Zagrebački tamburaši from Croatia. The late Janika Balaž and still living Jerry Grcevich are his favourite tamburitza musicians and co-workers. Zvonko Bogdan is still very active and he plays in Serbia and Croatia, and all over the world where Serbian and Croatian people live.

Bogdan is also a prolific harness racer, and horses and affection for them are common themes in Bogdan's songs. He is considered one of the most successful racers of Vojvodina In 2001, at the Zagreb Hippodrome, he won the Hrvatski kasački derbi (Croatian Harness Race Derby), establishing a record that still stands.

Some of his most recognized songs are "Ej salaši na severu Bačke", "Osam tamburaša s Petrovaradina" (Eight Tamburitza Players from Petrovaradin), "Bunjevačko prelo" (Bunjevac Village Party), "U tem Somboru" (In That Sombor), "Već odavno spremam svog mrkova" (I've Been Preparing My Black Horse for a Long Time), "Ne vredi plakati" (There's No Point in Crying), "Govori se da me varaš" (There Are Rumours You're Cheating on Me), "Kraj jezera jedna kuća mala" (One Little House Next to a Lake), "Fijaker stari" (Old Fiacre), "Prošle su mnoge ljubavi" (Many Loves Have Passed) and "Ko te ima, taj te nema" (The One Who Has You, Does Not Have You).

Bogdan married his wife in Belgrade. They have two children, and three grandchildren. He has been living in Subotica since 1980.

== Influence ==
The most prominent Croatian tamburitza artists, such as Zlatni Dukati, Kićo Slabinac and Miroslav Škoro have recorded many songs that Bogdan wrote or is known for singing them. Zlatni Dukati made an album Starogradska pjesmarica (Old Town Song Book) in 1994, with many popular Bogdan's songs. Kićo Slabinac also started to sing tamburitza songs in the 1970s and part of his repertoire is very similar to Bogdan's. Miroslav Škoro, who is an apprentice of Jerry Grchevich, has a habit to perform "Ej salaši na sjeveru Bačke" in almost every concert as dedication to Zvonko Bogdan.

In 1990, Croatian poet Drago Britvić and composer Siniša Leopold wrote a song "Svirci moji" (My Musicians) specifically for Zvonko Bogdan, for him to perform at the traditional Zlatne žice Slavonije festival of tamburitza songs in Požega, Croatia. Because of the Yugoslav crisis, Bogdan did not have a chance to make his performance, but Đuka Čajić stepped in and won the festival. It took more than a decade for Bogdan to perform the song before an audience. In the Croatian Radiotelevision show Hit do hita (Hit After a Hit) in April 2004, Zvonko Bogdan finally gave his premiere of "Svirci moji". Since then, it has become a regular song in his repertoire. Krunoslav Slabinac and Zlatni Dukati also recorded their version of this song, which became a tamburitza classic.

During the past years, Zvonko Bogdan has written a few Croatian patriotic songs such as "Otvori prozor" (Open the Window), "Od Konavala pa do Zagore" (From Konavle to the Hinterland), "Markova čežnja" (Marcus' Longing). In May 2003, at the Brodfest, an annual tamburitza festival held in Slavonski Brod, Zvonko Bogdan won the Hand of Freedom Award for the song "Od Konavala pa do Zagore". The song lyrics were declared the most patriotic lyrics written for the Croatian tamburitza scene in 2002.

== Discography ==
=== Albums ===
Biseri narodne muzike (with Janika Balaž orchestra)

- Released: April 22, 1971
- Format: LP
- Label: PGP RTB

Zvonko Bogdan

- Released: October 15, 1972
- Format: LP
- Label: PGP RTB

Zvonko Bogdan i orkestar Šandora Lakatoša (with Šandor Lakatoš orchestra)

- Released: December 4, 1973
- Format: LP
- Label: PGP RTB

Zvonko Bogdan peva za Vas

- Released: October 8, 1974
- Format: LP
- Label: PGP RTB

Što se bore misli moje

- Released: March 19, 1976
- Format: LP
- Label: PGP RTB

Zvonko Bogdan (with the Tamburica orchestra of RTV Novi Sad conducted by Janika Balaž)

- Released: January 10, 1980
- Format: LP
- Label: PGP RTB

Zvonko Bogdan i tamburaški orkestar Janike Balaža (with Janika Balaž orchestra)

- Released: June 6, 1981
- Format: LP
- Label: PGP RTB

Pesme i pesnici (with the Tamburica orchestra of RTV Novi Sad conducted by Janika Balaž)

- Released: February 15, 1984
- Format: LP
- Label: PGP RTB

Legolas

- Released: June 22, 1984
- Format: LP
- Label: PGP RTB

Svaku ženu volim ja (with Julija Bisak and "Veseli Vojvođani" orchestra)

- Released: June 20, 1988
- Format: LP
- Label: PGP RTB

Život teče u laganom ritmu

- Released: 2001
- Format: CD
- Label: Croatia Records

Živim život k'o skitnica

- Released: 2002
- Format: CD
- Label: A Records, Sombor

Rariteti

- Released: 2003
- Format: CD

Uspomena na vreme koje se sigurno ponoviti neće

- Released: 2004
- Format: Double CD

Panonija i ja

- Released: 2005
- Format: CD
- Label: Vojvodina Music

Tko te ima, taj te nema

- Released: 2007
- Format: CD
- Label: Croatia Records

Godine su mnoge prošle (with Tamburica Orchestra "Serbus")

- Released: 2008
- Format: CD
- Label: Manart & Serbus
