= Janika Balaž =

Serbian tamburitza musician and bandleader

- Јаника Балаж
- Janika Balaž's Zvuci tamburice
- Born: 23 December 1925; Lukino Selo, Kingdom of Serbs, Croats and Slovenes
- Died: 12 November 1988 (aged 62); Novi Sad, SR Serbia, SFR Yugoslavia
- Monuments: Statue in Novi Sad
- Occupation: Musician
- Known for: Tamburitza player and band leader

Janika Balaž (Serbian Cyrillic: Јаника Балаж; Hungarian: Balázs Janika; 23 December 1925 – 12 November 1988) was a famous tamburitza musician and band leader from Vojvodina, Serbia.

== Life ==
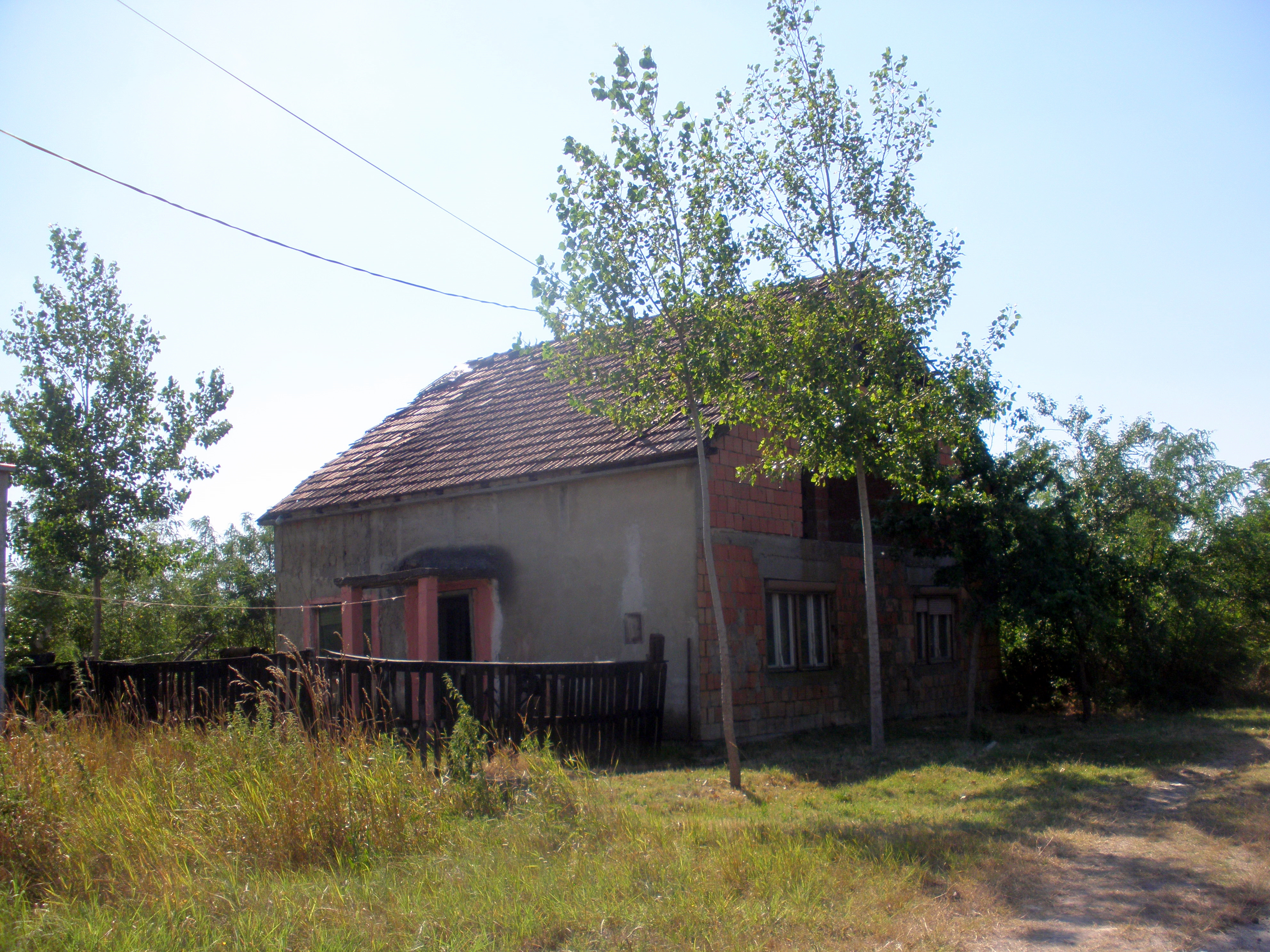
House in Lukino Selo in which Janika Balázs (or Balaž) was born

He was born 1925 to a Hungarian-speaking Romani family with strong musical tradition. His father's surname was Rac (Rác, or Rácz), which was a Hungarian term for Serbs that was considered derogatory, so he took the mother's surname Balaž (Balázs). He grew up in Bečej, where he started playing violin in a local kafana with 10 years of age. When he realized that he couldn't become the best violinist, he switched to ("prim" or "bisernica") tamburitza which he played ever since. Later, he played with "Braća kozaci" band in the area of Subotica and Horgoš. From 1948 to 1951, he worked in Radio Titograd in Montenegro, where he perfected his tamburitza play.

From its foundation in 1951 to the end of his working career he worked in Radio Novi Sad and was a member of its Grand Tamburitza Orchestra. He was spending nights playing with his 8-men band in kafanas of Novi Sad, especially on Petrovaradin Fortress, of which he became one of icons. During his career, he held concerts across the world, including 36 performances in Paris Olympia. Allegedly, he had several offers from United States and Soviet Union to move there and work as a tamburitza teacher, but he never wanted to leave Novi Sad, where he died in 1988.

Janika participated in several documentary and feature films. Songs "Osam tamburaša s Petrovaradina" (Eight tambouritza-players from Petrovaradin) and "Primaši" were dedicated to him. During his career, he worked with many renowned musicians, including Zvonko Bogdan and Júlia Biszák.

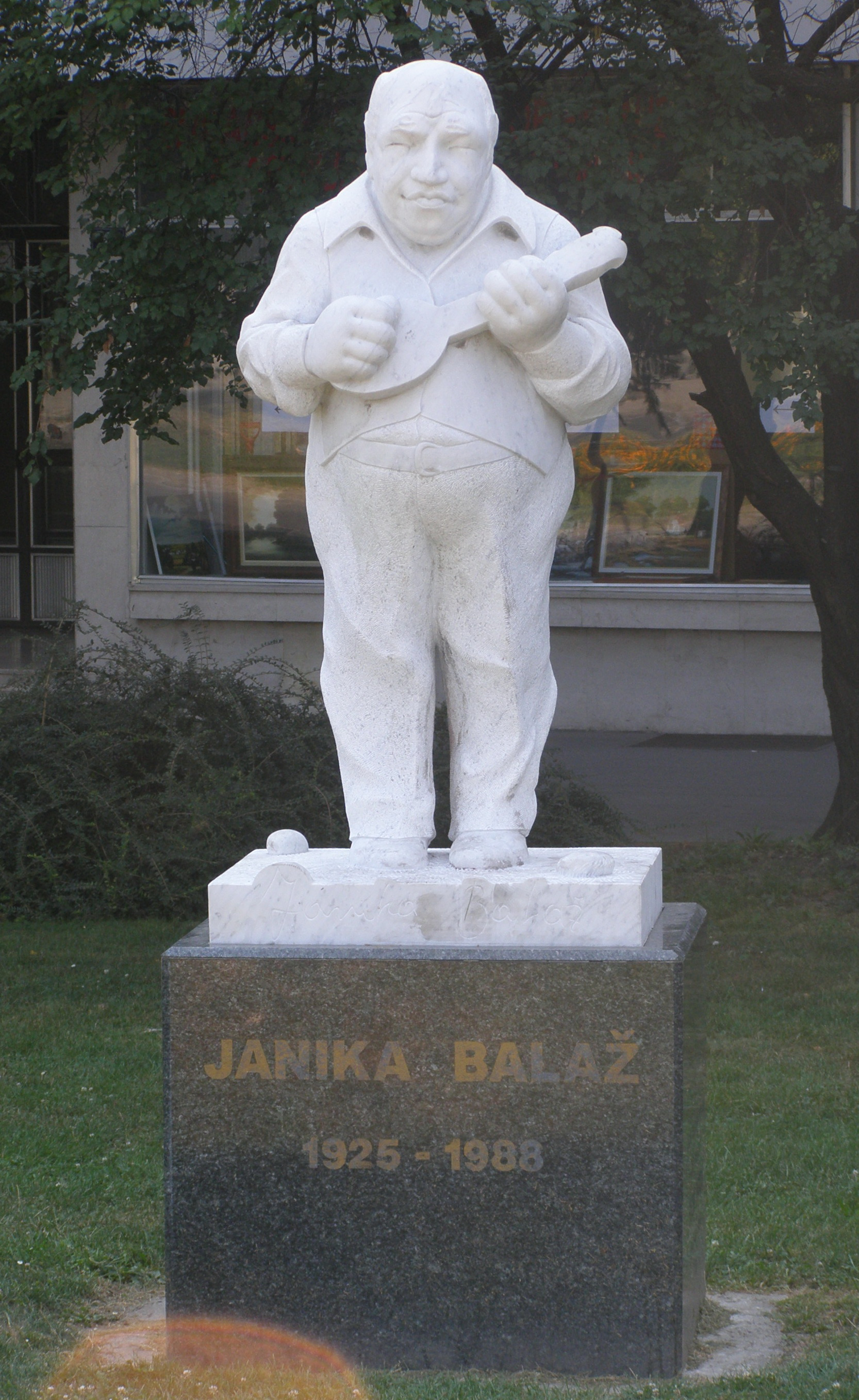
Statue of Janika Balaž in Novi Sad

After his death, the city of Novi Sad raised a monument (authored by sculptor Lászlo Szilágyi), standing on a square opposite the Petrovaradin fortress across the Danube.

== Quote ==
He has always been, in jazz speech, a band leader. Unification of orchestra's sound is something unique, something we could hear only at uncle Janika's. However, his solo parts are something unique, they had an emotion which is impossible to explain. Among thousands of tambouritzas, it was always easy to recognize the one of Janika Balaž.

— Jovan Adamov, conductor of Radio Novi Sad dance orchestra

== See also ==
- Music of Vojvodina
- Music of Serbia
