= Belo Blato =

Serbian village

Belo Blato Бело Блато (Serbian) Biele Blato (Slovak) Erzsébetlak (Hungarian)
- Village (Selo)
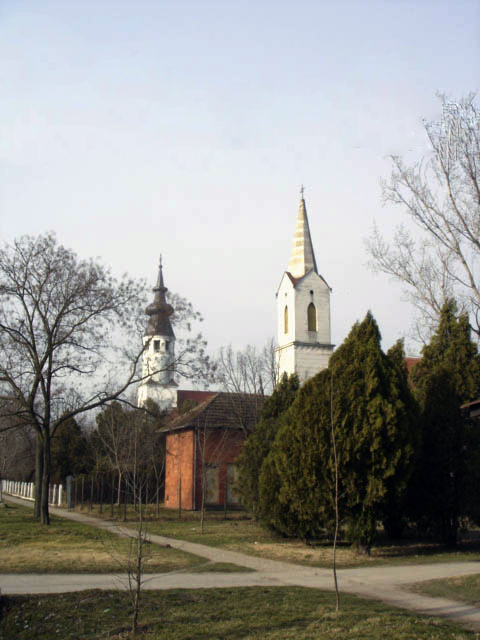

- Location within Serbia Belo Blato (Serbia) Belo Blato (Europe)
- Coordinates: 45°16′13″N 20°22′18″E
- Country: Serbia
- Province: Vojvodina
- District: Central Banat
- Municipalities: Zrenjanin
- Elevation: 68 m (223 ft)

Population (2022)
  - Total: 1,034
- Time zone: UTC+1 (CET)
  - Summer (DST): UTC+2 (CEST)
- Postal code: 23205
- Area code: +381(0)23
- Car plates: ZR

Belo Blato (Serbian Cyrillic: Бело Блато; Slovak: Biele Blato or Lízika; Hungarian: Erzsébetlak, Nagyerzsébetlak, Torontálerzsébetlak, Nagyerzsébetlak-Lízika or Szlovák Lízika) is a village located in the administrative area of the City of Zrenjanin, Central Banat District, Vojvodina, Serbia. The village has a population of 1,034 people (2022 census).

== Name ==
In Serbian the village is known as Belo Blato (Бело Блато), in Slovak as Biele Blato or Lízika, in Hungarian as Nagyerzsébetlak, in Banat Bulgarian as Belo-Blato and Liznájt, and in German as Elisenheim.

== History ==
Belo Blato was settled in 1883 by Slovak people from the village of Padina (in south Banat), where Slovaks from Slovakia settled several years earlier. These Slovaks were poor but very active. After few years, they built in a new village the new Evangelical church, house for priest, school for children, and mill. Soon after Slovaks, the Hungarian and Bulgarian settlers settled in Belo Blato as well. They came from neighbouring villages of Mužlja and Lukino Selo.

== Demographics ==
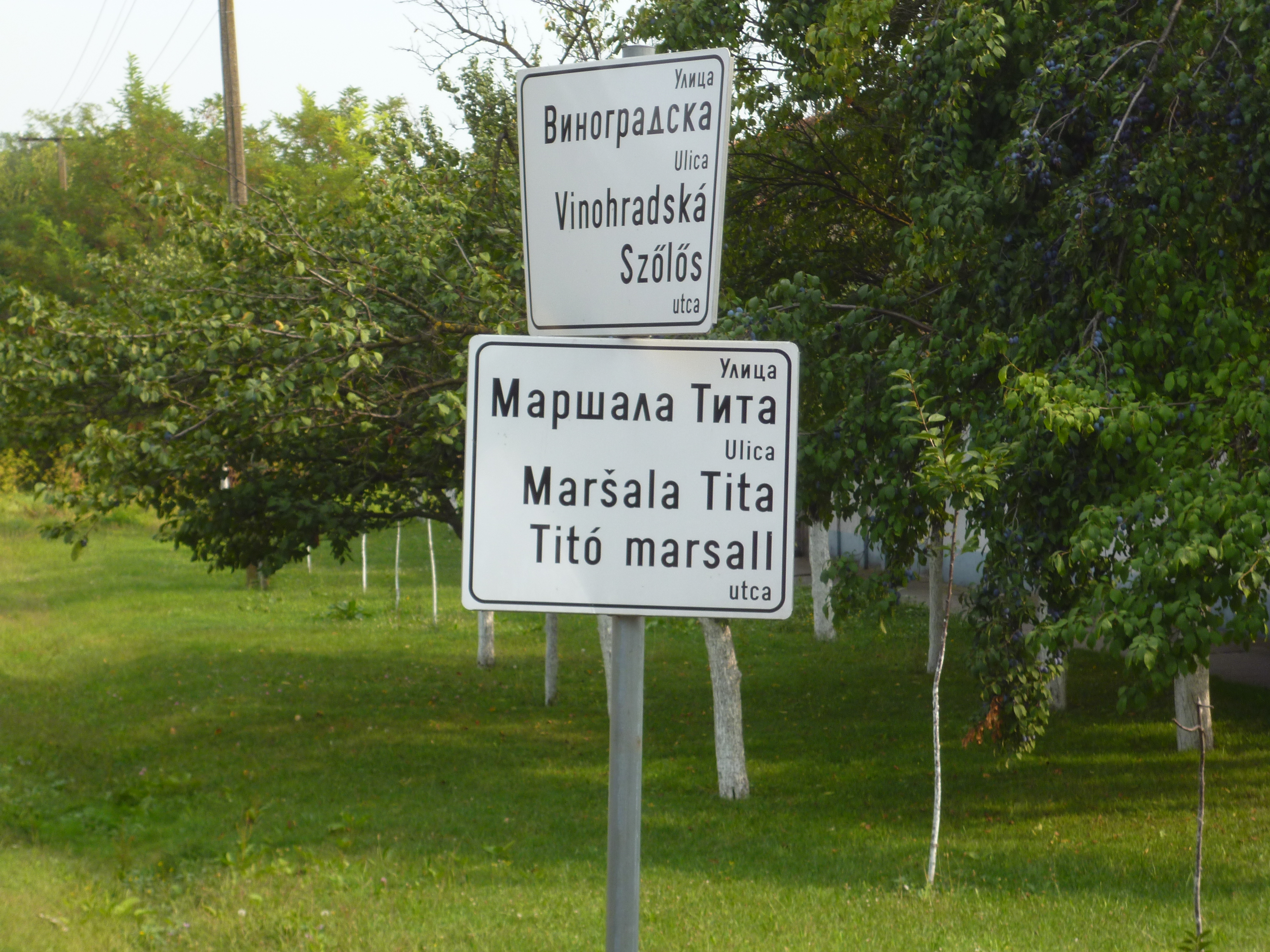
Street name sign, Marshal Tito Street, in Serbian, Slovak, and Hungarian languages, in Belo Blato.

=== Historical population ===
- 1961: 2,031
- 1971: 1,841
- 1981: 1,746
- 1991: 1,762
- 2002: 1,477
- 2011: 1,342
- 2022: 1,034

=== Ethnic groups ===
According to data from the 2022 census, ethnic groups in the village include:

- 349 (33.7%) Slovaks
- 318 (30.7%) Hungarians
- 159 (15.3%) Serbs
- 52 (5%) Bulgarians
- Others/Undeclared/Unknown

== See also ==
- List of places in Serbia
- List of cities, towns and villages in Vojvodina
