= Ečka =

Ečka Ечка
- Village (Selo)
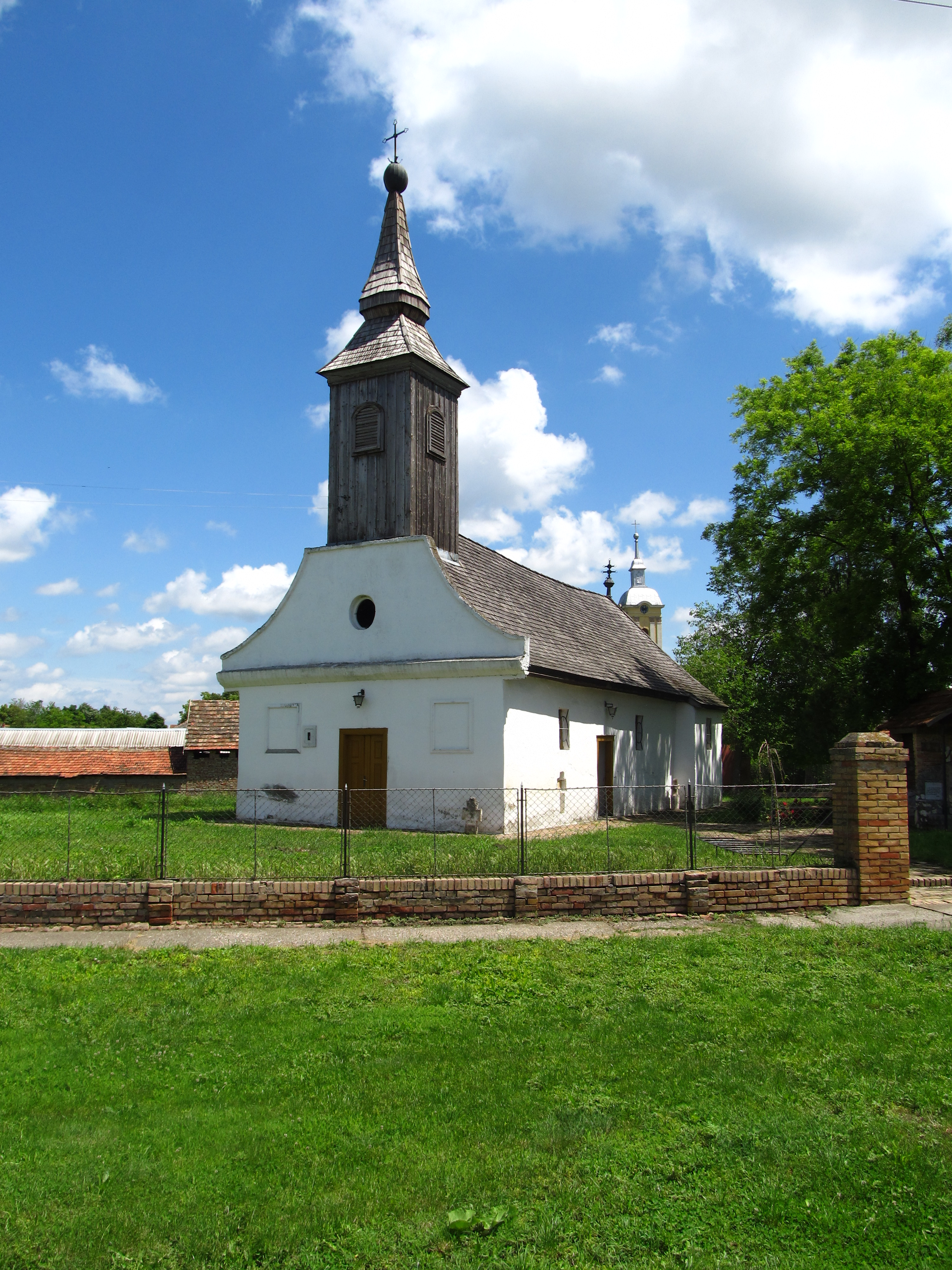
- Serbian Orthodox Church (1711)
- Interactive map of Ečka
- Coordinates: 45°19′04″N 20°26′20″E
- Country: Serbia
- Province: Vojvodina
- District: Central Banat
- Municipalities: Zrenjanin
- Elevation: 71 m (233 ft)

Population (2022)
  - Total: 3,406
- Time zone: UTC+1 (CET)
  - Summer (DST): UTC+2 (CEST)
- Postal code: 23203
- Area code: +381(0)23
- Car plates: ZR

Ečka (Serbian Cyrillic: Ечка, pronounced [êtʃka]; Romanian: Ecica, Hungarian: Écska) is a village located in the Zrenjanin municipality, in the Central Banat District of Serbia. It is situated in the autonomous province of Vojvodina on the Begej river.

== Name and history ==
In Serbian, the village is known as Ečka (Ечка), in Romanian as Ecica or Ecica Română, in German as Deutsch-Etschka, and in Hungarian as Écska (until 1899: Német-Écska).

The village was merged with former settlement known as Mala Ečka (Мала Ечка) in Serbian, Alt Etschka in German, and Román-Écska or Olahécska in Hungarian.

== Ethnic groups (2002 census) ==
The village has a Serb ethnic majority and its population numbering 4,513 people (2002 census).

- Serbs = 2,483 (55.02%)
- Romanians = 1,325 (29.36%)
- Hungarians = 196 (4.34%)
- Yugoslavs = 123 (2.73%)
- Romani = 72 (1.60%)

== Historical population ==
- 1900: 4,892
- 1931: 5,207
- 1948: 3,934
- 1953: 4,188
- 1961: 4,323
- 1971: 4,621
- 1981: 5,293
- 1991: 5,172
- 2002: 4,513
- 2011: 3,999
- 2022: 3,406

== Culture ==
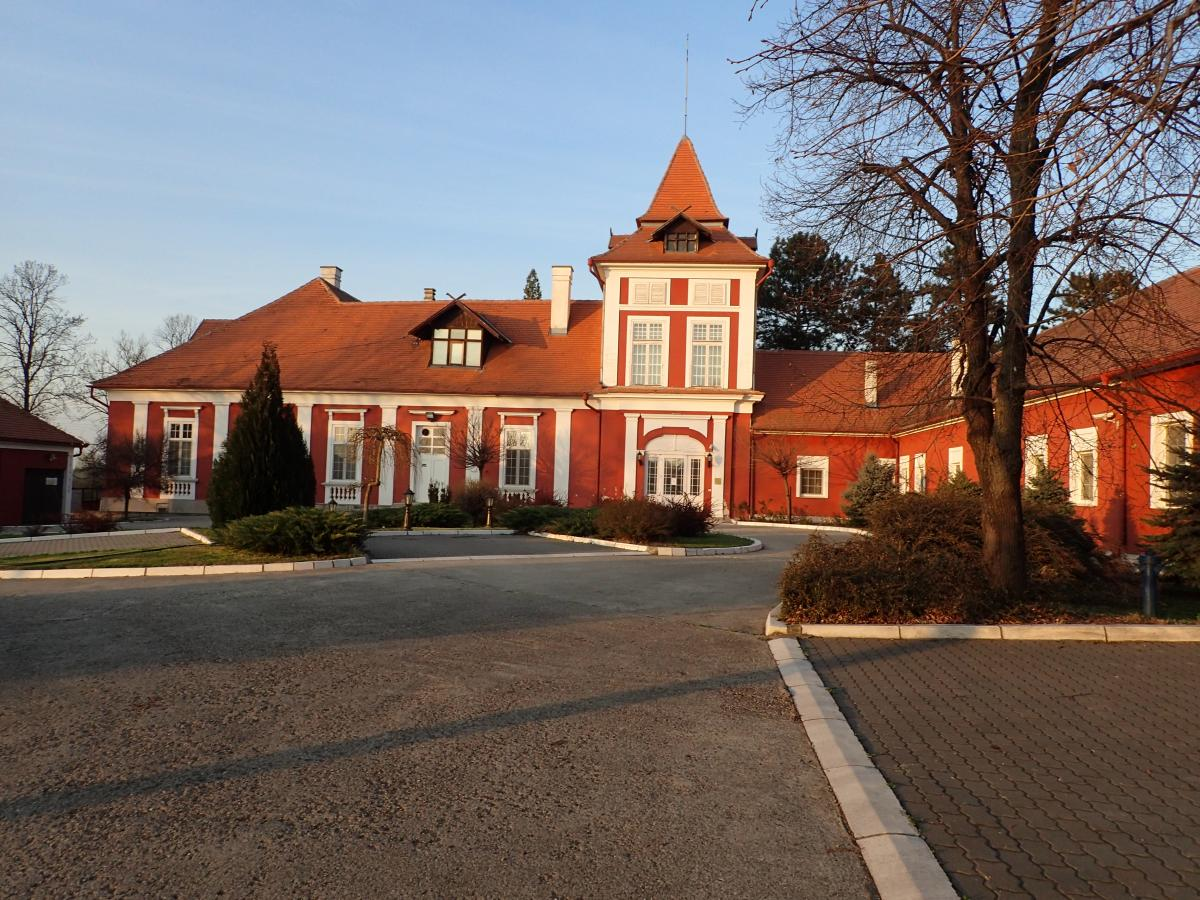
Kaštel Ečka, owned by Lazar, Thurn und Taxis, Harnoncourt and Pallavicini family

Kaštel Ečka is a historic hunting castle and a cultural monument. The estate was purchased by the Lazar family in 1781 and developed over the following decades. At the Castle's grand opening ceremony in 1820, Franz Liszt played piano as a nine-year-old boy. Kaštel Ečka estate includes the main building, horse stables, and the water tower.

In 1870, after the death of the last male member of the Lazar family and the castle owner, Sigismund Lázár de Ecska (d. 1870), his widow, Viktoria Edelspacher de Gyorok (1841-1895) inherited the castle. In 1871, due to her second marriage to Prince Egon Maximilian (1832-1892), the castle becomes the property of the House of Thurn und Taxis, later owned by the families of Harnoncourt and Pallavicini until the end of the WWII.

There are three churches in Ečka:

- Serbian Orthodox Church of St. Nikola was built in 1711. The iconostasis is the work of Teodor Popović from 1786.
- Romanian Orthodox Church was built in mid 19th century. The interior is equipped with an iconostasis and a throne of the Virgin brought from the church in Crepaja.
- The Catholic Church of St. John Baptist was built in 1864 and financed by the Lazar Family. It is located at the place of an older church, adjacent to Kaštel Ečka.

== Education ==
The first school in Ečka was established in 1711, within the Serbian Orthodox Church. New school was built in 1894, with initial classes in Romanian language and classes in Serbian added at a later date. Today's school "Dr Aleksandar Sabovljev" was established in 1957, and still has classes both in Romanian and Serbian.

== See also ==
- List of places in Serbia
- List of cities, towns and villages in Vojvodina

== Additional pictures ==
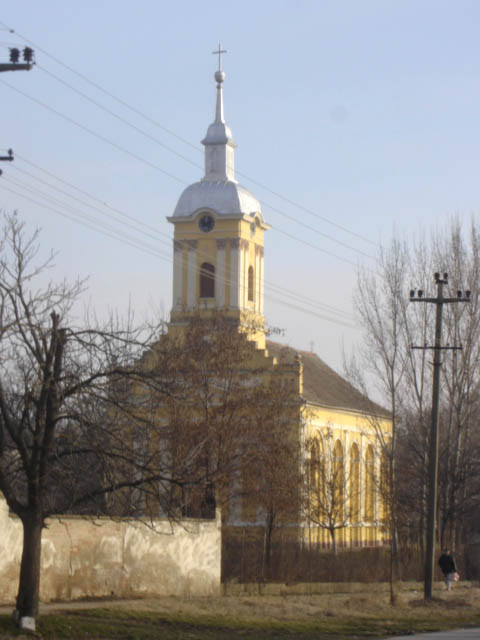
The Romanian Orthodox Church

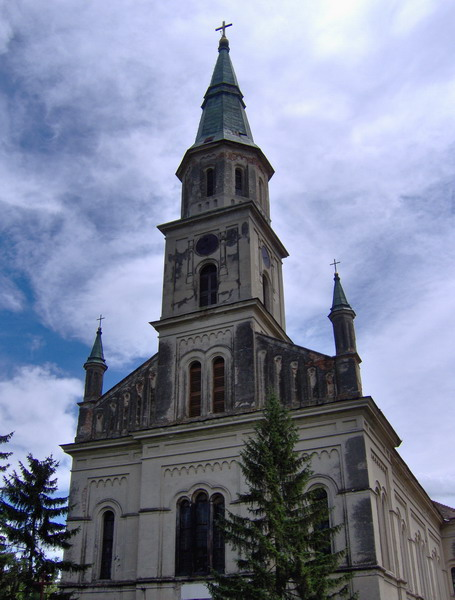
The Catholic Church of St. John Baptist, built in 1864 as the third church

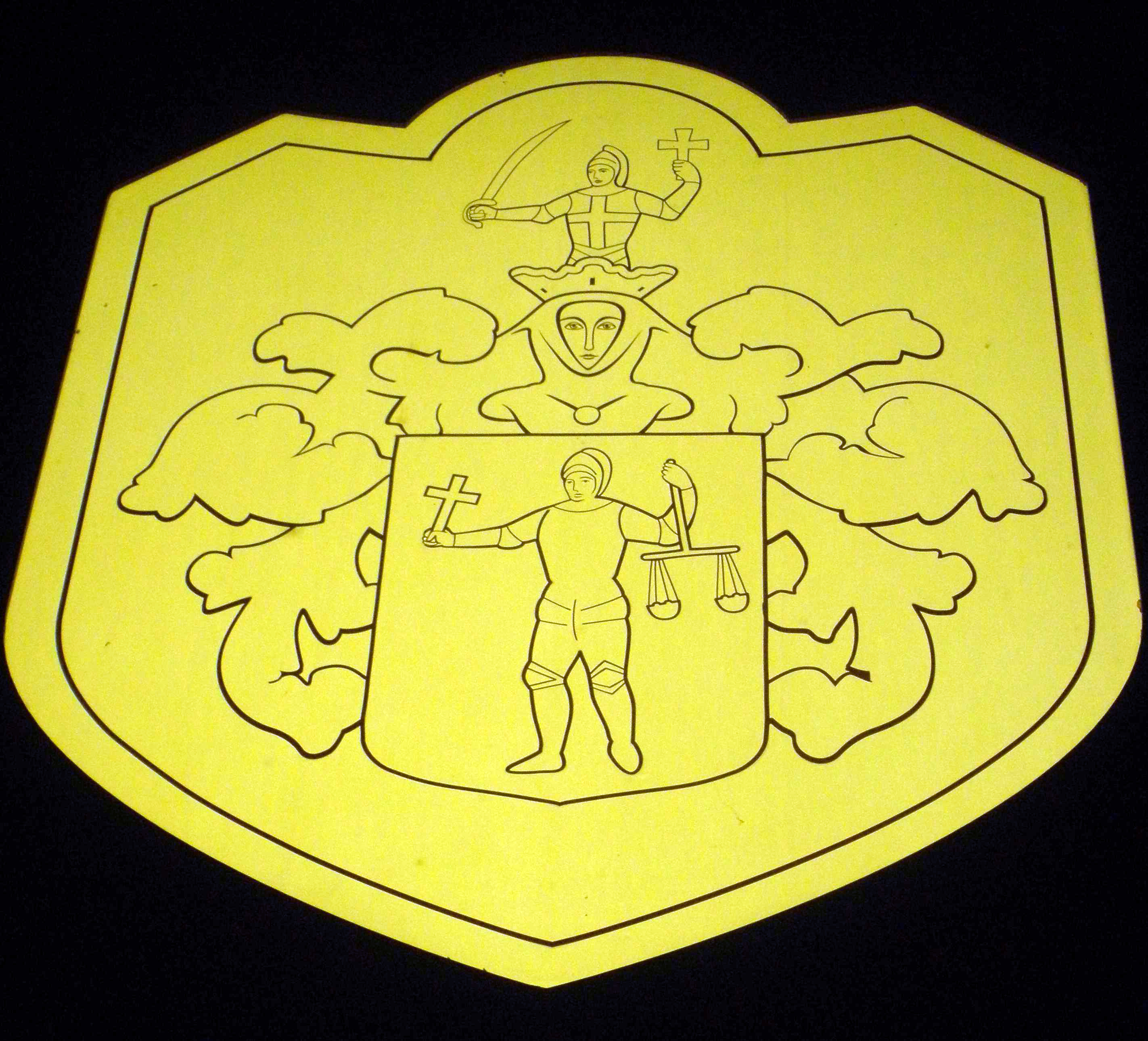
Blazon of counts Lazar in Ečka

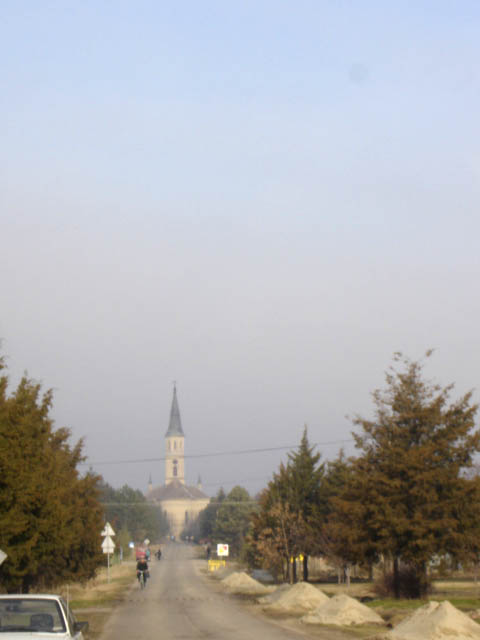
Main street and the Catholic Church

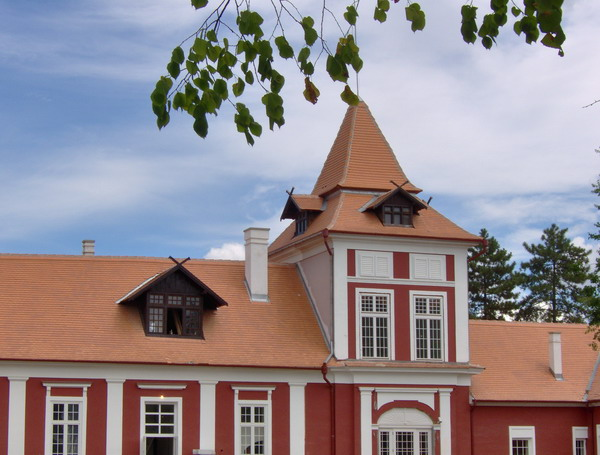
Kaštel Ečka built in 1820, by Lazar Lukács

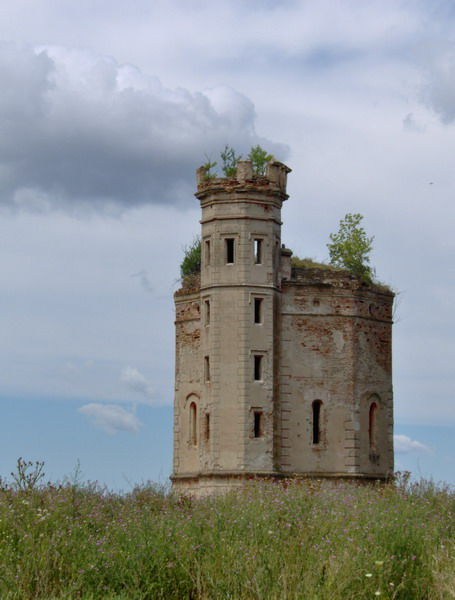
Tower in Ečka

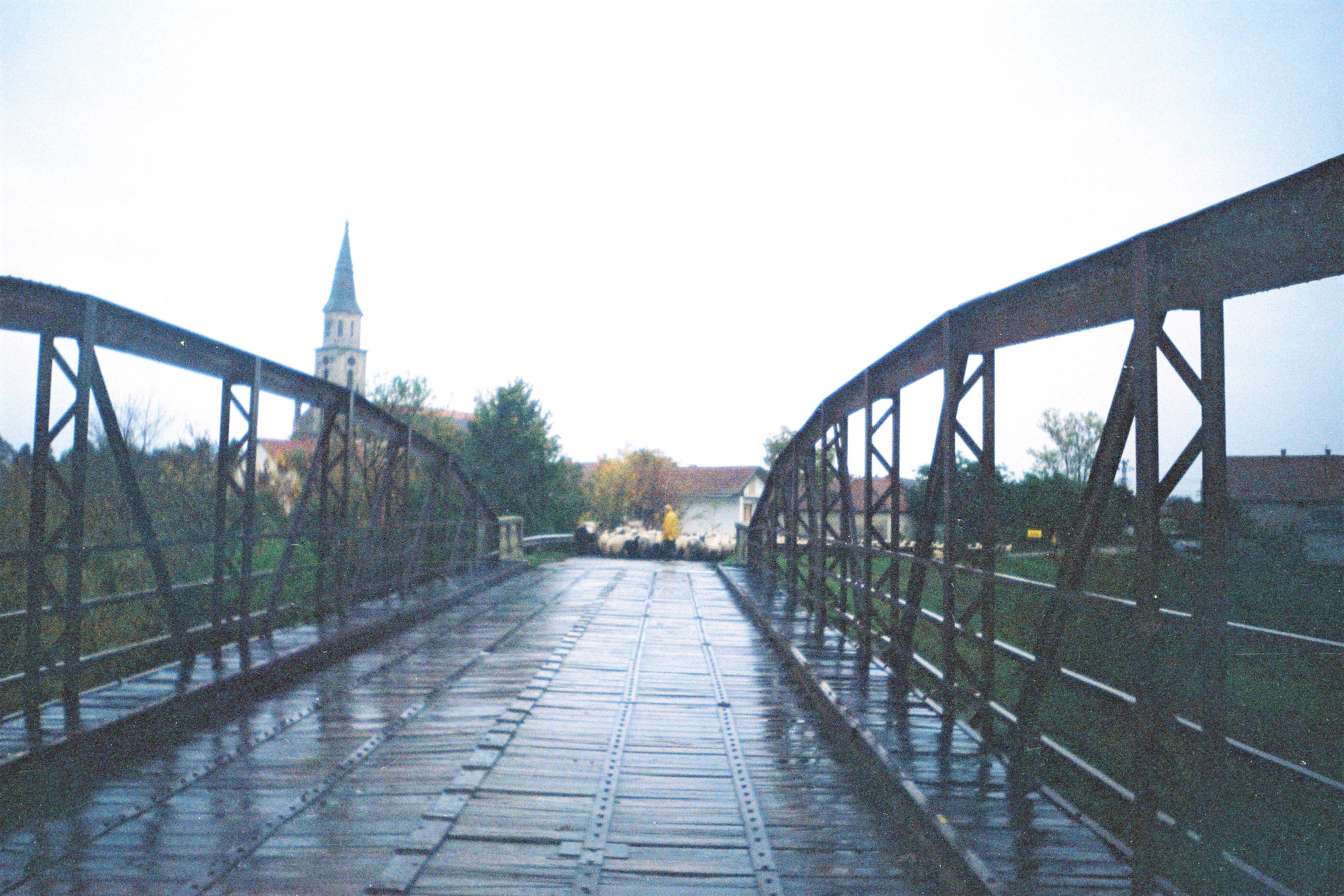
Old wooden bridge over Begej 1995, built 1889, renovated 1894 and later 2005

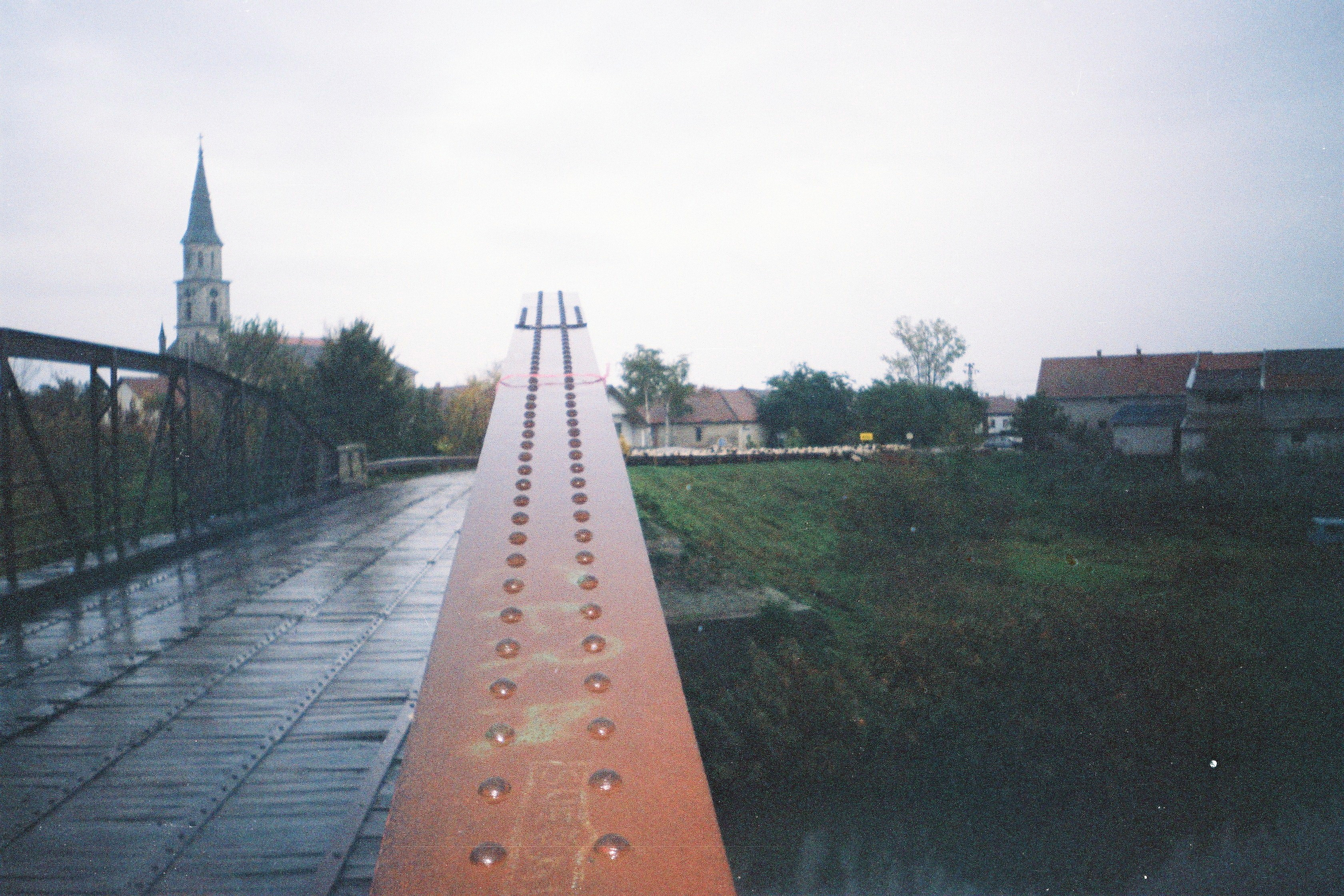
Old bridge over Begej 1995 with sheep and church in background
