= A6 motorway (Romania) =

Motorway in Romania

A6 motorway

- Map of the opened section of the A6 motorway, as of December 2013

Route information
- Maintained by Compania Națională de Autostrăzi și Drumuri Naționale din România
- Length: 11.4 km (7.1 mi) 260 km (planned)
- Existed: 2013–present

Major junctions
- From: A 1 at Balinț
- To: Lugoj

Location
- Country: Romania

Highway system
- Roads in Romania; Highways
| ← A 5 | → A 7 |

The A6 motorway (Romanian: Autostrada A6) is a partially built motorway in Romania, planned to connect Bucharest with the Banat region, through the southern part of the country. It will follow the route: Craiova, Calafat, Drobeta-Turnu Severin, Lugoj, connecting with the A1 motorway near Balinț. The section between Balinț and Calafat, where it will provide access to the New Europe Bridge, is part of the southern branch of the Pan-European Corridor IV.

== Description ==
It is currently operational on a section of 11.4 km, between the interchange with the A1 motorway near Balinț and Lugoj. The segment was part of the construction contract for the first section of the A1 motorway sector between Lugoj and Deva, and is operational since December 2013.

The rest of the project has been in pre-feasibility phase since October 2012, as the South Motorway (Romanian: Autostrada Sudului), and the precise route is yet to be decided. A junction with the Pitești–Craiova Expressway is planned near the city of Craiova.

The Lugoj-Calafat segment has received attention in 2020 for being built as a NATO strategic project.

== Exit list ==
| County | Location | km | mi | Destinations | Notes |
|---|---|---|---|---|---|
| Timiș | Balinț | 0 | 0.0 | A 1 – Timișoara (West), Deva (East) | Northern terminus |
| Timiș | Coșteiu | 2 | 1.2 | DJ609B – Țipari | |
| Timiș | Lugoj | 10 | 6.2 | DN6 – Lugoj | Temporary Southern terminus |
1.000 mi = 1.609 km; 1.000 km = 0.621 mi
