= DEx12 expressway =

Expressway in Romania

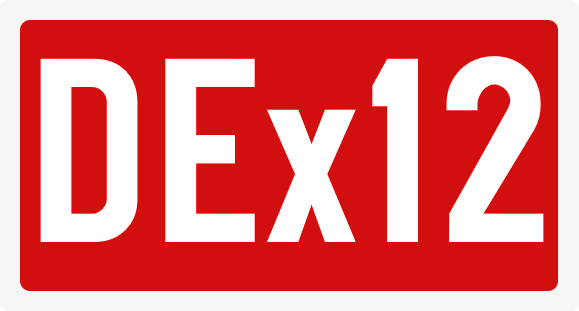
DEx12 expressway
- Drumul expres DEx12

Route information
- Maintained by Compania Națională de Autostrăzi și Drumuri Naționale din România
- Length: 121.1 km (75.2 mi)
- Existed: 2022–present

Major junctions
- From: A 6 near Craiova (planned)
- To: A 1 near Pitești

Location
- Country: Romania
- Counties: Dolj, Olt, Argeș

Highway system
- Roads in Romania; Highways
← A 11	→ A 13

The DEx12 expressway (Romanian: Drumul expres DEx12), also known as the Pitești–Craiova Expressway (Romanian: Drumul expres Pitești–Craiova), is a expressway in the south-western part of Romania, previously labelled as A12, when it was considered as a future motorway. It connects the cities of Pitești (branching off the A1 motorway), Slatina and Craiova (where it is planned to merge with the also planned A6 motorway), being 121 km long, with an estimated total cost of 1.66 billion euro.

As of 31 July 2025, the entire Craiova - Pitești segment is in service, totaling 121.1 km (75.2 mi), meaning that the expressway is open on its entire length.

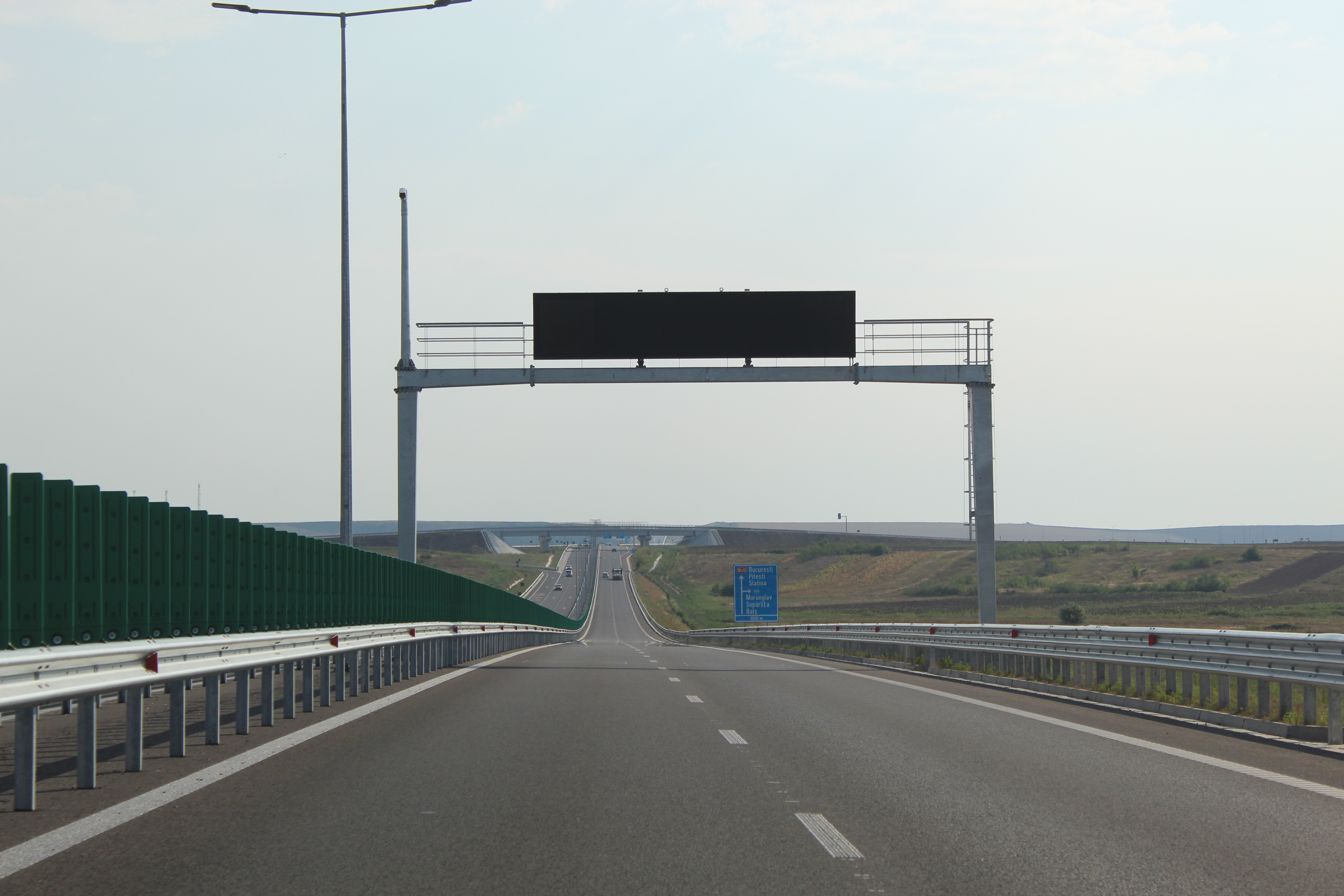
Expressway 12 near Piatra Olt

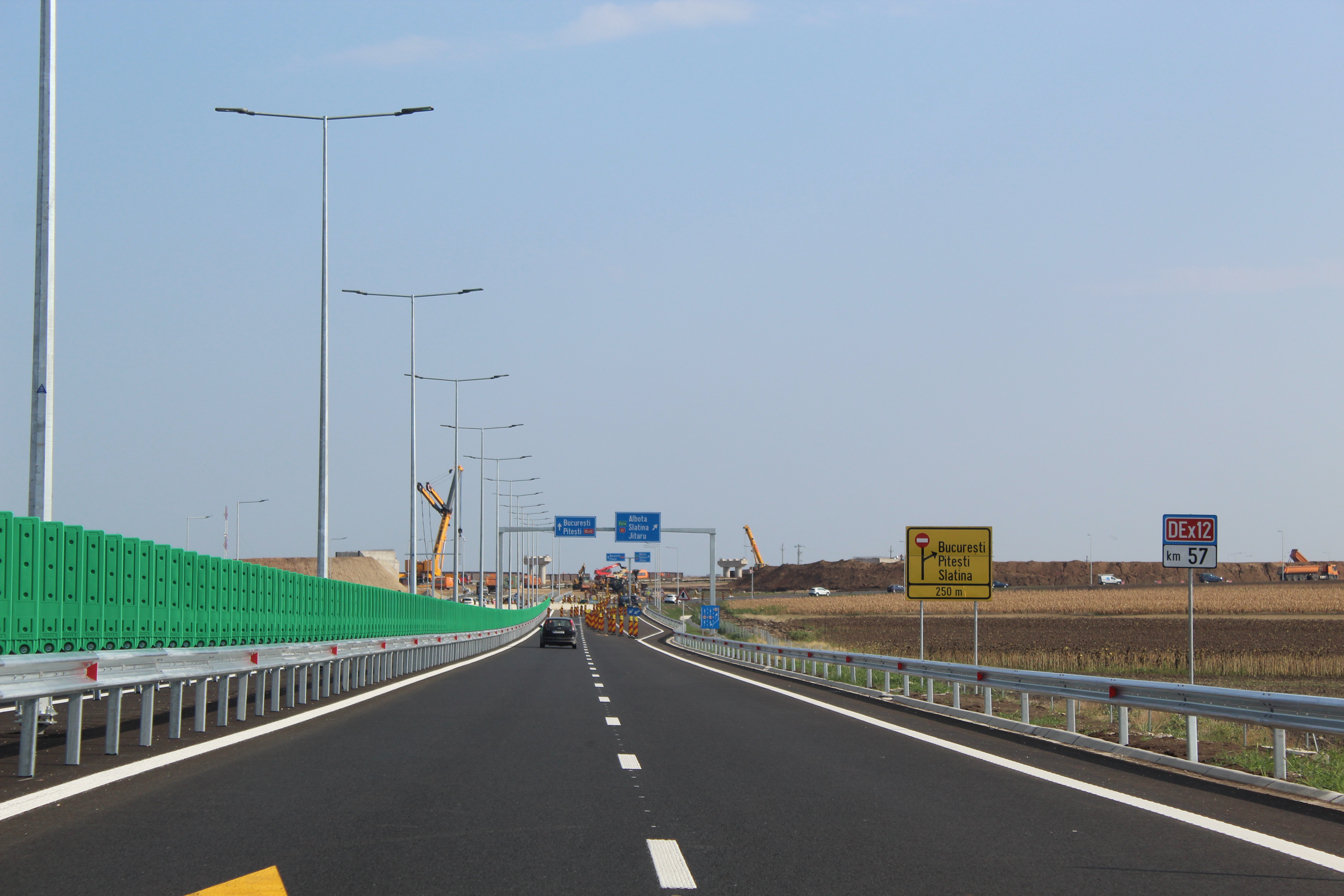
Temporary terminus of Expressway 12 east of Slatina in August 2022, today this is a through road

== History ==
While planned as a motorway, the construction was tendered as a concession contract in March 2013, that should have been awarded until December 2013. It was also yet to be decided whether it would be built as a motorway or an expressway.

In April 2017, it was suggested for the first time that this road will be an express road and not a motorway. Despite receiving criticism in the media for this switch, the road was tendered in November 2017.

It is split into four sections. The contracts for the sections 1 and 2 were awarded in October 2018 to the Italian company Tirrena Scavi and the Romanian company Spedition UMB, respectively, while those for the sections 3 and 4 had been signed in September 2020 with the Romanian joint-venture SA&PE Construct-Spedition UMB-Tehnostrade, without waiting for the decisions of the Bucharest Court of Appeal, the bids being challenged by several other participants. Initially, the first tenders for the sections 3 and 4, launched during 2017, had been canceled in August 2018 due to other participants challenging them, being launched again during 2019.

Works on section 3 were allowed to begin in May 2021, but the contract for section 4 was terminated by the Bucharest Court of Appeal, who obliged the CNAIR to review the bids of the Chinese company China Railway, of the Turkish company Nurol, and of the Italian company Rizzani, all who challenged the winning bid for the said section. In August 2021, the contract for section 4 was signed again with the same Romanian joint-venture with which the first contract was signed.

Among companies asking for the expressway works to begin as soon as possible was the automaker Ford, who has a car plant in Craiova. Due to this, the expressway is sometimes referred to as the Autostrada Ford (Ford motorway). In May 2021, the CNAIR submitted a request for the financing of a feasibility study and technical project for what could be a new connecting road between National Road 6 near the Ford Craiova plant and the DEx12 expressway.

In March 2022, construction works for section 4 began. However, on 21 December, the contract for section 1, with Tirrena Scavi, was cancelled. The progress for the execution of the section currently sits at 58.26%.

== Openings timeline ==
- 21 April 2022: Slatina - Balș (16.0 km)
- 28 July 2022: the Slatina bypass (21.3 km)
- 23 December 2023: Slatina - Colonești (31.88 km)
- 28 November 2024: Colonești - Albota (20.1 km)
- 29 November 2024: Craiova - Balș (17.7 km)
- 31 July 2025: Albota - Pitești (11.2 km)

== Exit list ==
County	Location	km	mi	Destinations	Notes
Dolj	Craiova	0	0.0	DN65F – Craiova North	
Dolj	Craiova	1	0.62	DJ643F – Craiova, Ghercești	
Dolj	Pielești	14	8.7	Short-term parking	
Olt	Balș	21	13	DN65 – Balș West	
Olt	Balș	27	17	DJ644 – Balș East	
Olt	Bârza	29	18	Short-term parking	
Olt	Piatra-Olt	35	22	DN65 – Slatina West, Găneasa, Piatra-Olt	
Olt	Slătioara	41	25	Short-term parking	
Olt	Slatina	50	31	DJ546 – Slatina South	
Olt	Valea Mare	55	34	Short-term parking	
Olt	Valea Mare	57	35	DN65 – Slatina North	
Olt	Scornicești	67	42	Short-term parking	
Olt	Scornicești	74	46	DN65 – Negreni, Scornicești	
Olt	Colonești	83	52	Short-term parking	
Olt	Colonești	88	55	DN65 – Colonești	Planned
Argeș	Lunca Corbului	99	62	Short-term parking	
Argeș	Costești	108	67	DN65A – Podu Broșteni, Costești, Albota	
Argeș	Suseni	113	70	DJ659 – Suseni	Planned
Argeș	Oarja	115	71	Short-term parking	
Argeș	Suseni	121	75	A 1 – Pitești South	
1.000 mi = 1.609 km; 1.000 km = 0.621 mi: Unopened

== See also ==
- Roads in Romania
- Transport in Romania
