= Autostrada A1 =

Autostrada A1 may refer to:

- Autostrada A1 (Italy)
- Autostrada A1 (Poland)
- A1 motorway (Romania) – in Romanian: Autostrada A1
