= Timișoara–Moravița Motorway =

Planned motorway in Romania

A9 motorway

Route information
- Part of E70
- Maintained by Compania Națională de Administrare a Infrastructurii Rutiere
- Length: 0 km (0 mi; 0 ft) 72.93 km (45.32 mi) (planned length)

Major junctions
- From: A 1 near Timișoara
- To: Moravița (border with Serbia)

Location
- Country: Romania

Highway system
- Roads in Romania; Highways
← A 8	→ A 10

The Timișoara–Moravița Motorway (Romanian: Autostrada Timișoara–Moravița) is a proposed motorway in the southwestern part of Romania, labelled as A9. It will connect the city of Timișoara to the border with Serbia. Feasibility studies for the whole motorway are currently ongoing. It is planned to be 72.93 km long.

== Route ==
The motorway begins east of Timișoara at the junction with the A1 motorway near Remetea Mare. It will bypass the largest city of the historical region of Banat in east. South of Timișoara, near Giroc, there will be a connecting road to the Timișoara ring bypass. From here, the motorway will head south towards Jebel, Opatiţa and Stamora Germană, east of the DN59, before reaching the border with Serbia near Moravița.

In Serbia, the motorway is planned to head towards the capital of Belgrade via Vršac, where it would connect to the rest of the Serbian motorway network, thus providing a high-speed connection from Romania to Montenegro and other former Yugoslav countries, but could also work as an alternative route between Romania and Western Europe via Serbia and Croatia, rather than Hungary.

The motorway will have a total length of 72.93 km and will be divided into three sections:

- section 1 from the current junction on A1 at Remetea Mare (km 0) to 600 meters after the intersection with DJ 693B (km 35+670);
- section 2 up to DN 57 (km 69+160);
- section 3 will represent the last three and a half kilometers to the border crossing point, where a new customs office will also be built.

== See also ==
- Roads in Romania
- Transport in Romania
