= A1 motorway (Romania) =

Motorway in Romania

A1 motorway

- Map of the A1 motorway, as of August 2026

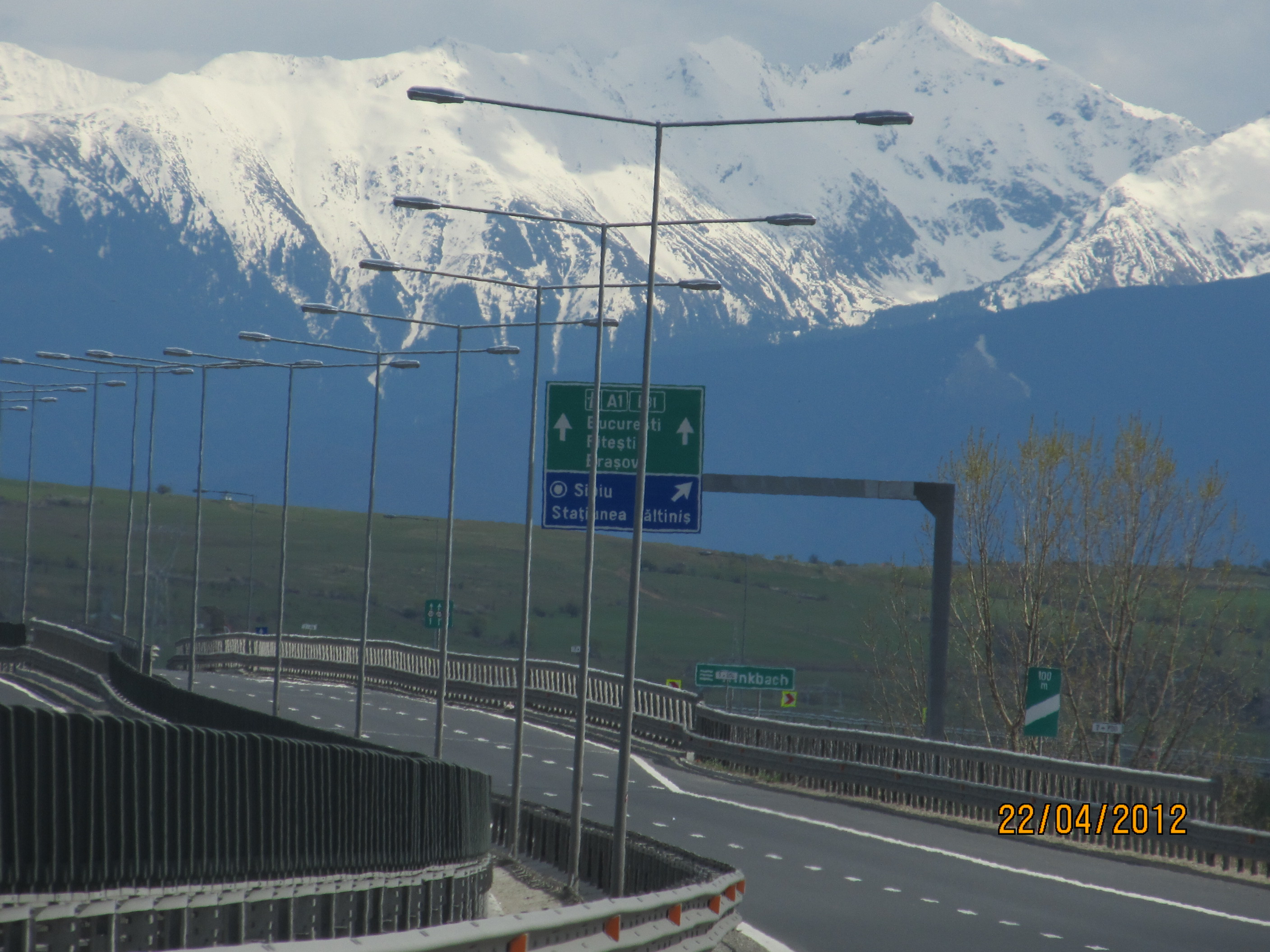

Route information
- Maintained by Compania Națională de Administrare a Infrastructurii Rutiere
- Length: 487 km (303 mi) 581 km (361 mi) planned 92 km (57 mi) under construction
- Existed: 1972–present

Major junctions
- East end: Bucharest
- A 0 near Ciorogârla; DEx12 near Pitești; A 13 near Sibiu (under construction); A 10 at Sebeș; A 6 near Lugoj; A 9 near Timișoara (planned); A 11 at Arad
- West end: M43 at Nădlac (border with Hungary)

Location
- Country: Romania
- Counties: Ilfov, Giurgiu, Dâmbovița, Argeș, Vâlcea, Sibiu, Alba, Hunedoara, Timiș, Arad
- Major cities: Bucharest, Pitești, Sibiu, Sebeș, Orăștie, Deva, Timișoara, Arad

Highway system
- Roads in Romania; Highways
← A 0	→ A 2

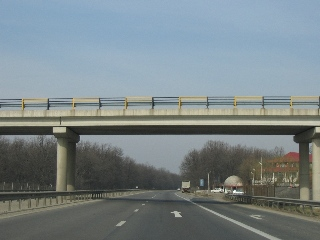
Bucharest – Pitești segment – country road overpass at km 55 (westbound view)

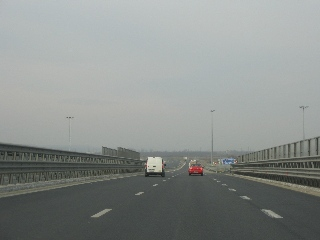
Pitești bypass segment – Pitești East node at km 115 (westbound view)

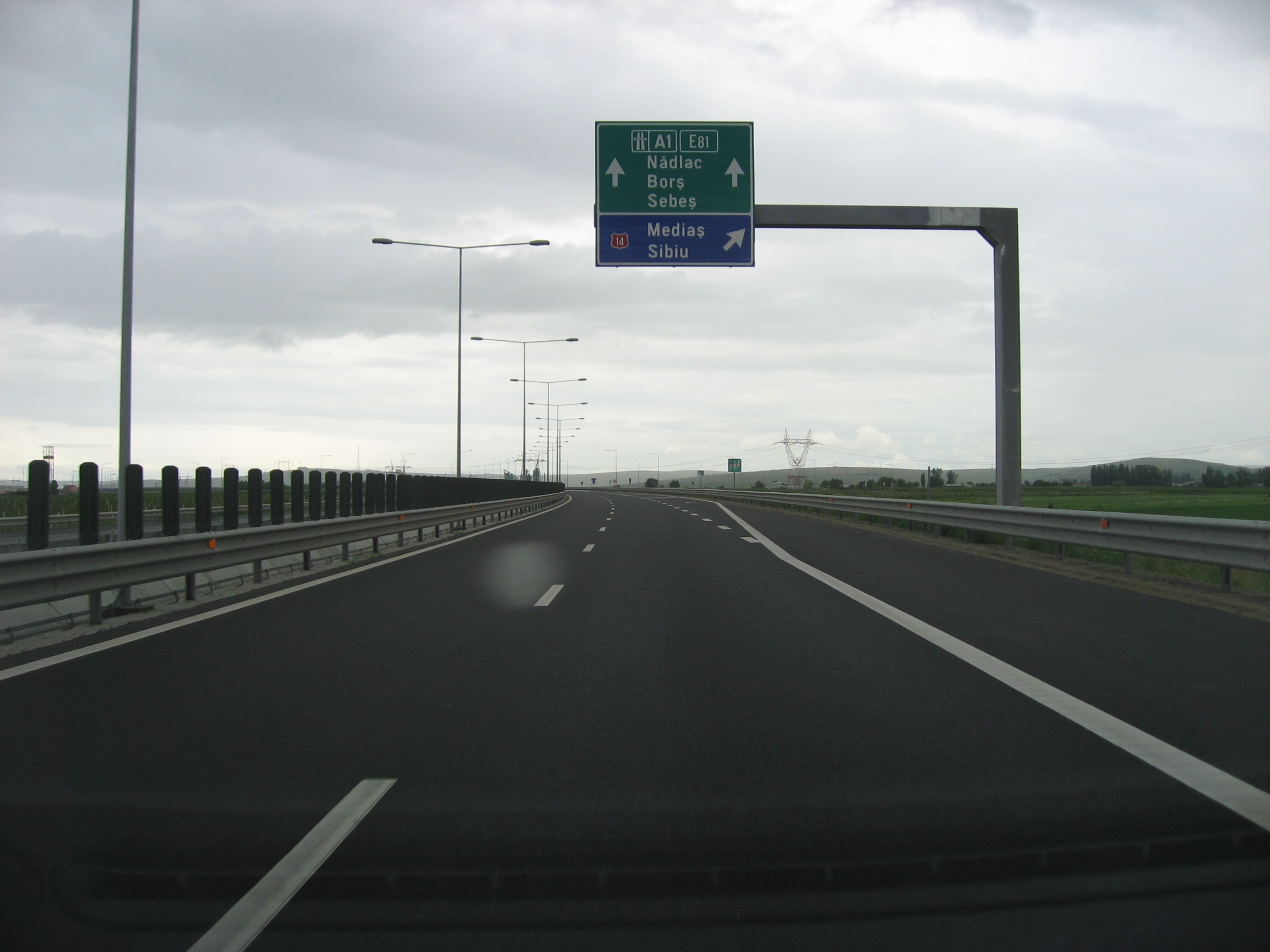
Sibiu bypass section – A1/DN14 node at km 246 (westbound view)

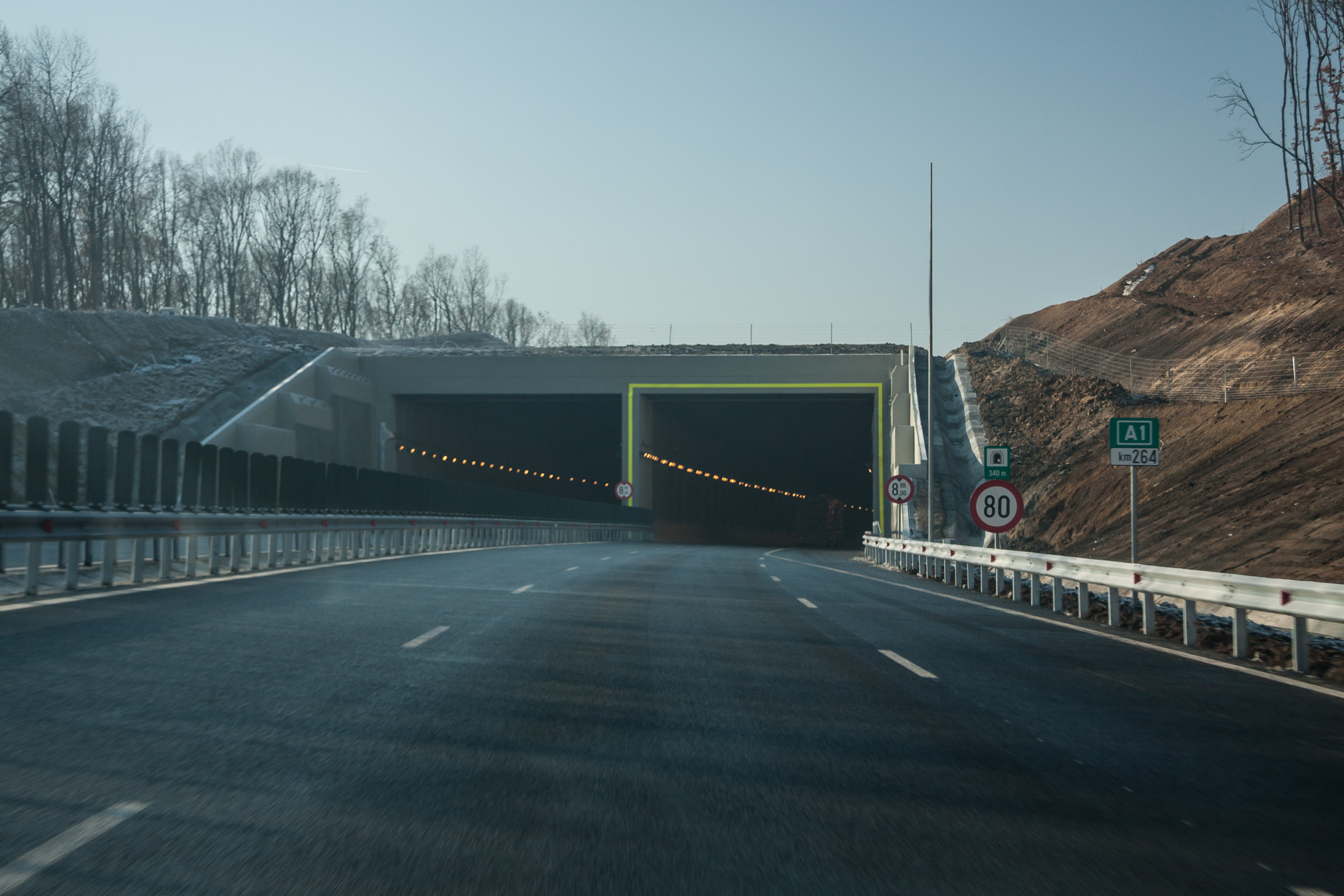
Sibiu – Săliște segment – Săcel Tunnel at km 264 (westbound view)

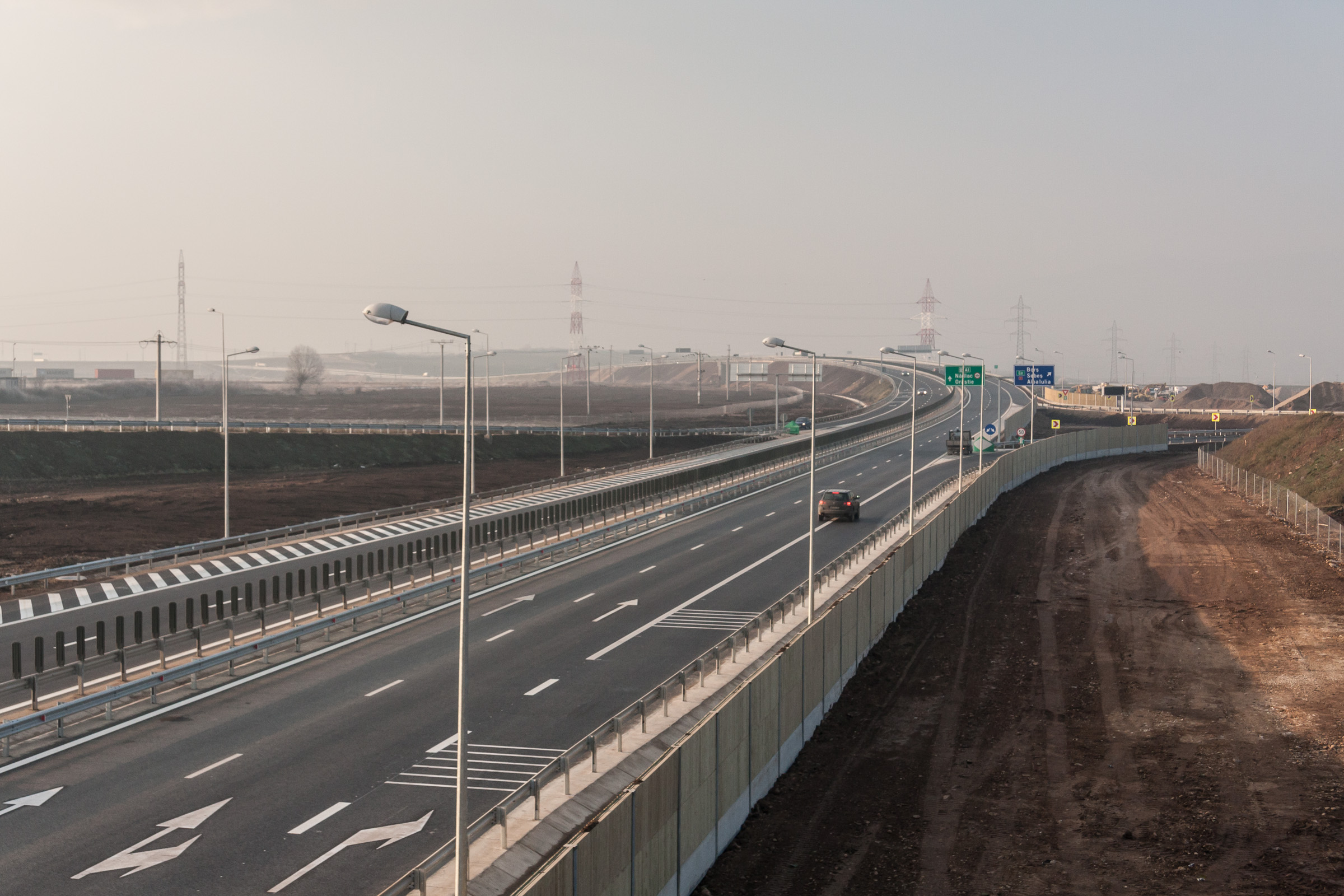
Sebeș – Orăștie segment – Sebeș North node at km 309 (westbound view)

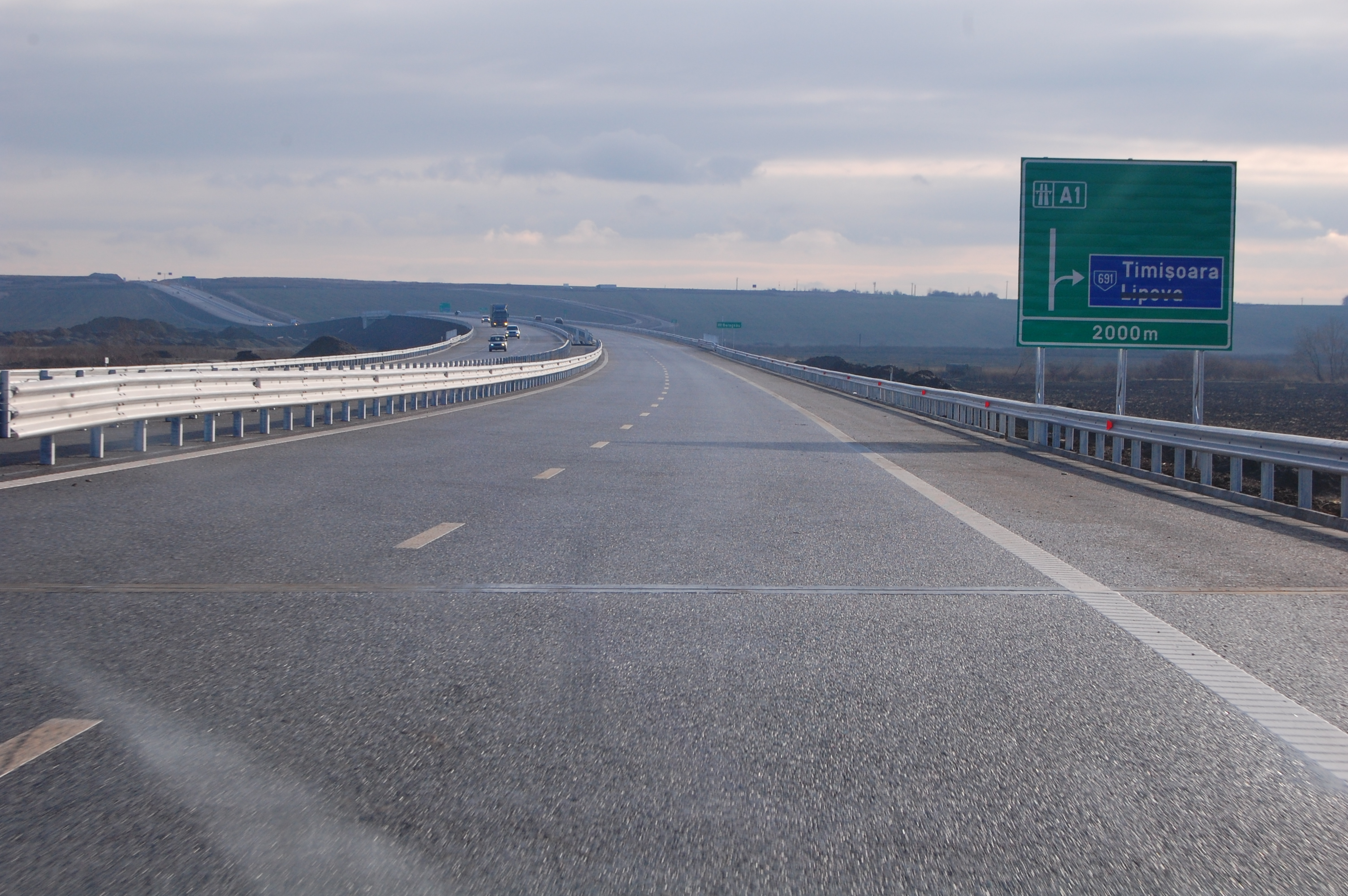
Timișoara – Arad segment at km 506 (eastbound view)

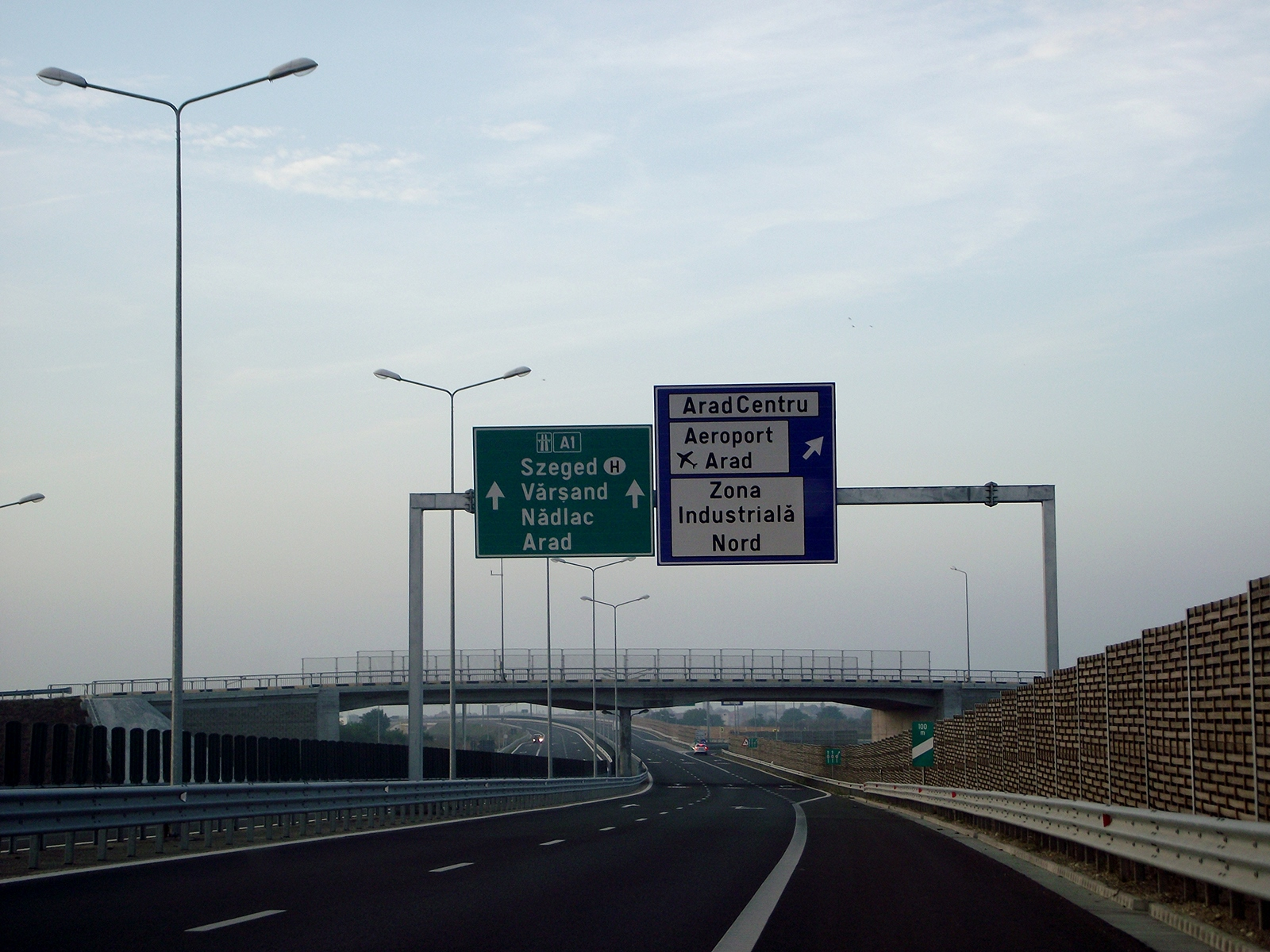
Arad bypass segment – Arad center/airport node at km 542 (westbound view)

The A1 motorway (Romanian: Autostrada A1) is a partially built motorway in Romania, planned to connect Bucharest with the Banat and Crișana regions in the western part of the country and the rest of Europe. When completed it will be 581 kilometres long, spanning the country from south-east to west. The motorway starts in the western part of Bucharest and connects the following cities: Pitești, Sibiu, Deva, Timișoara, Arad, connecting with Hungary's M43 motorway near Nădlac. As the motorway is built along the Trans-European Transport Networks Rhine-Danube Corridor its construction receives 85% funding from the European Union. The road is part of the proposed Via Carpatia route.

As of June 2025, the combined length of the opened sections totals 487 kilometres, with all the remaining sections under construction. The parts of the motorway currently in service include Bucharest – Curtea de Arges (140 km), Boița – Holdea (188 km) and Margina – Nădlac (158.8 km).

An additional segment, between Coșevița – Margina (13.5 km), which has several tunnels (2.1 km, in total) along its route is currently under construction

On the Pitești – Sibiu section, two segments were tendered as well: Pitești − Curtea de Argeș (30.4 km, lot 5) and Curtea de Argeș − Tigveni (10.7 km, lot 4), with the latter one awarded for construction in April 2019, and the first segment (Pitești − Curtea de Argeș) in May 2020.

In December 2024, the 16-km segment from Pitești to Curtea de Argeș (lot 5) was opened 8 months ahead of schedule.

== Sections ==
=== Bucharest – Pitești ===
This section of the motorway is fully operational and is composed of two segments: Bucharest – Pitești and Pitești bypass.

The Bucharest – Pitești segment (95.9 km) is the first motorway-class road built in Romania and remained the only one for more than 15 years, until the completion of the Fetești – Cernavodă segment on the A2 motorway in 1987. Construction works began on 4 February 1967 and the motorway's initial carriageway was opened on 12 April 1972, before eventually entering into full service to all traffic on 11 September 1972, except for oversize loads that were restricted to the old DN7 road. Various parts of the segment underwent several major rehabilitations: between 1997 and 2000 by the FAT joint venture composed of Italian companies Federici, Astaldi and Todini, between 2002 and 2004 by the Romanian companies Albix Timișoara and Cosar București and between 2006 and 2010 by Romanian companies PA&CO Internațional and Euroconstruct Trading '98. As of August 2023 this is the only segment of the motorway where motels and restaurants operate in rest areas.

The Pitești bypass segment (13.6 km) was awarded in April 2004 to a joint venture composed of Italian companies Astaldi and Italstrade. The segment was opened to traffic during November 2007, having a major role in diverting traffic from the Pitești city centre. An underpass in the Bascov area (north of Pitești) was also built to resolve traffic congestion at the nearby junction of the DN7 and DN7C roads which was generating in turn problems at the Pitești motorway end. The underpass was fully completed during October 2008.

=== Pitești – Sibiu ===
This section of the motorway is partially under construction and is split into five segments: Pitești – Curtea de Argeș (lot 5), Curtea de Argeș – Văleni (lot 4), Văleni – Racovița (lot 3), Racovița – Boița (lot 2), Boița – Sibiu (lot 1).

This is the most difficult section of the whole motorway from construction works perspective, considering that it has to cross the Carpathian Mountains, partly along the Olt River Valley. The feasibility study was initially completed during late 2008 with plans to start construction works next year, however the Romanian Government has continuously delayed the start of the activity until 2012, considering several options on how the motorway construction was to be funded, while advancing several deadlines for the start/completion of works on the section. As during early 2012 the section was accepted to be funded under European Union's Cohesion Fund, the 2008 feasibility study had to be updated with several key elements required by the European Union that were previously not considered. The tender for the update was launched in April 2012 aiming to have the section finalized by 2020, as total construction costs for its 116.6 kilometers were estimated at 3.25 billion euro. Eight months later the Romanian Government reconsidered and cancelled the tender.

The year 2013 brought much controversy, as the Romanian Government declared that the priority motorway route for crossing the Carpathian Mountains will be the A3 motorway (between Comarnic and Brașov) instead of the A1 motorway (between Pitești and Sibiu) and further supported the idea of modifying the route of the Pan-European Corridor IV to pass through Brașov. According to the same plans the A3 motorway was to be connected to the A1 motorway via another motorway between Sibiu and Făgăraș, thus creating a nearly complete motorway corridor between Bucharest and Sibiu, via Brașov, while the section between Pitești and Sibiu was no longer an immediate priority. This was generally regarded as a strategy to avoid a competing alternative route to the section of the A3 motorway between Comarnic and Brașov, which was planned to be built via a concession contract. During the 2013 Trans-European Transport Networks (TEN-T) reunion the European Union rejected the plan and officially criticized the attempt to switch priorities from constructing the Pitești – Sibiu motorway, determining the Romanian authorities to reconsider the change.

After further trying unsuccessfully in December 2013 to persuade the European Union to change the route of the motorway to pass through Râmnicu Vâlcea, the Romanian Government has retendered in June 2014 the update of the 2008 feasibility study for the section, and has signed the contract for this activity with a joint venture composed of the Italian company Spea Ingegneria Europea and the Romanian company Technic Consulting Engineering in June 2015, after an appeal from one of the bid participants. As the Ministry of Transport has started work on the Romanian General Master Plan for Transport required to access 2014–2020 European funds, it generated further controversy by appearing to continue to try avoiding the construction of the section as a motorway, as it downgraded it to express road in an October 2014 version of the Master Plan and later considered a phased express road/motorway approach in a subsequent version of the Master Plan. This has prompted reactions from the European Union, the public society and the employees of the Dacia plant near Pitești, and while the Romanian Prime Minister announced during October 2014 that the section will be included as a motorway in the final version of the Master Plan the change was reflected in the document only in July 2015.

In an interview given by the general manager of CNADNR during August 2015 it was announced that possible routes for lots 1 and 5 were already discussed with the joint venture updating the feasibility study and based on that the company will hold public consultations during October 2015, where all interested parties will be invited to comment on the proposed solutions and also to contribute with knowledge regarding the potential problems CNADNR might face on the selected routes. Dependent on the issues that might be identified and their environmental impact, the bid for the construction works on these two lots might be launched as early as January 2016. CNADNR has published on 7 November 2015 five alternative routes for the Pitești – Sibiu section. As previously announced all interested parties are welcome to provide their opinion by 11 December 2015 on the company's Facebook page. Following these consultations, it is expected that on 15 December 2015 the company preparing the feasibility study will hand over to CNADNR the final study for lots 1 and 5.

According to the approved version of the Master Plan, the section was expected to be completed until 2020 using a mix between European funds, Romanian budget and low interest loans.

The works for lots 1 and 5 were tendered in July 2017 and for lot 4 in March 2019. As of April 2019, the lot 1 was awarded for construction to the Austrian company Porr, for nearly 128.7 million euro, with 12 months allowed for planning and 36 months for execution. The other two lots were still pending to be awarded.

Announcements of intention for a tender were published for two of the rest of the three lots, as well, in April 2018.

As of July 2019, the lot 1 of this section (Boița – Sibiu, 13.1 km) is undergoing construction.

On 11 May 2020, the contract for the construction of the lot 5 (Pitești – Curtea de Argeș, 30.4 km) was signed with the Italian company Astaldi. The value of the contract is 356 million euro and it is scheduled to take 12 months for planning and 48 months for execution. The lot 4 (Curtea de Argeș – Tigveni, 9.86 km) followed on 15 November 2021; the contract for its construction was signed with the Austrian company Porr. On 7 February 2022, the contract for the construction of the lot 2 (Boița – Cornetu, 31.3 km) was signed with the Turkish joint-venture Mapa-Cengiz. On 1 August 2022, the contract for the construction of the lot 3 (Cornetu–Tigveni, 37.3 km) was signed with Webuild. It is the most expensive roadbuilding contract ever signed in Romania. On 15 December 2022, lot 1 (Sibiu - Boița, 13.1 km) was opened to the public. Lot 5 was also opened, but in stages, with the first stage, between Pitești and Capu Piscului opening in December 2024, with the second stage opening on June 11 2025.

=== Sibiu bypass ===
This section of the motorway is fully operational.

The contract for the whole section (17.5 km) forming a partial beltway around Sibiu was initially signed during 2003 with Italian company Todini, with the actual construction work starting during 2004 and scheduled to finish during 2007. This plan suffered multiple delays and eventually in September 2006 CNADNR decided to terminate the contract. Following this, the section was split into two segments. The first segment (km 0-14) was awarded in May 2008 to a joint venture composed of Geiger, Max Bögl and Comtram. The second segment (km 14-17) was awarded in September 2009 to the Romanian company Vectra Service and included also the upgrade of 3.3 kilometers of road connecting the motorway with DN1 that was designated DN1T. Works started on the first segment during July 2008 and on the second during February 2010 and were scheduled to be fully completed during 2011, but as a result of the authorities insisting on the bypass being finished sooner the section was opened for traffic in December 2010.

=== Sibiu – Orăștie ===
This section of the motorway is fully open and is split into four segments: Sibiu – Săliște (lot 4), Săliște – Cunța (lot 3), Cunța – Sebeș (lot 2) and Sebeș – Orăștie (lot 1).

The bid for the design & build contracts for all four segments that are part of this section was launched by CNADNR during December 2010. The Cunța – Săliște segment (22.1 km), which includes the 1,100-metre (3,600 ft) long Aciliu viaduct was awarded to Italian company Impregilo in May 2011, while the Orăștie – Sebeș segment (24.1 km) was awarded to Austrian company Strabag, the Sebeș – Cunța segment (19.7 km) was awarded to a joint venture composed of Romanian companies Straco and Studio Corona and the Săliște – Sibiu segment (16.1 km) was awarded to Italian company Astaldi, all in June 2011. Construction works on all four segments have started in October 2011 and were planned to finish in April 2013. After several delays, lots 1, 2 and 4 were opened in December 2013, while lot 3 was eventually opened at the end of November 2014. As of November 2015 construction works were still ongoing on lot 3, as there are multiple issues on this lot generated by a combination of ignoring the terrain instability identified by the feasibility study, the low quality of the construction works and the Romanian Government pressuring for electoral reasons for the segment to open before a number of critical road elements were completed. Another aspect that has surfaced and is generating controversy is related to the fact that while there are multiple disputes awaiting resolution between CNADNR and Impregilo and during the construction of the segment there were around 300 non-conformity reports issued, CNADNR has paid to Impregilo the works executed. Following this, during August 2015 the general manager of CNADNR has given a number of interviews during various TV shows defending the company and putting all the blame for the issues on lot 3 on the poor quality of execution of Impregilo.

Regardless of the statements from both parties, the problems on lot 3 are serious enough so that they required CNADNR to close down the traffic on the affected lanes during August 2015, while having both the company's experts and Impregilo's ones looking for the technical solutions to address the issues. As those solutions were discussed and agreed, lot 3 was closed down to traffic, initially for about one month and a half, just nine months after it was inaugurated. According to information surfacing from various sources about one kilometer from the motorway will need to be completely rebuilt from the ground while other issues that appeared will be addressed as well. During October and November 2015 the conflict between CNADNR and Impregilo seems to have taken a turn for worse as after the promised one month and a half term passed no substantial progress has been made on fixing the identified problems, the construction works on the lot were completely stopped and CNADNR announced it made a penal complaint against Impregilo. Six months after the closing, come the spring of 2016, the CNADNR decided to fix the problems itself with its own workforce and rented equipment; part of the financing of these repairs was to come from the 90 million lei guarantee posted for the project by Impregilo, which was to be blacklisted for two years in which it would not be allowed to obtain contracts from the Romanian government.

On 10 October 2016, the lot 3 was re-opened after repairing works had reportedly been completed.

=== Orăștie – Deva ===
This section of the motorway is fully operational and is composed of two segments: Orăștie – Simeria and Simeria – Deva.

Bids for the construction works for this section were launched by CNADNR during 2006 and subsequently during September 2009, but they were both cancelled due to problems related to the selection criteria. The bid was launched again during March 2010 and the whole section (32.8 km) was finally awarded to the joint venture between the Austrian company Strabag and the Romanian company Straco Grup in November 2010, after appeals from the competing companies. Construction works have started in April 2011 and were planned to finish in April 2013. The Simeria – Deva segment (15.4 km) was opened during December 2012, while the Orăștie – Simeria segment (17.4 km) was opened during May 2013.

=== Deva – Lugoj ===
This section of the motorway is partially operational and partially under construction and is split into four segments: Șoimuș – Ilia (lot 4), Ilia – Coșevița (lot 3), Coșevița – Dumbrava (lot 2) and Dumbrava – Șanovița (lot 1).

The bid for the design & build contract for lot 1 was launched by CNADNR during December 2010. The contract included also the first segment of the A6 motorway (11.4 km) that is branching off from the A1 motorway near the village of Balinț and connecting the city of Lugoj. The Șanovița – Dumbrava segment (27.4 km) was awarded to a joint venture composed of Italian companies Tirrena Scavi, Societa Italiana per Condotte D'Acqua and Cossi Construzioni in May 2011, after an appeal from one of the bid participants. Construction works on lot 1 have started in October 2011 and were planned to finish in April 2013. After several delays, the segment was eventually opened during December 2013, but only between the junction with the A6 motorway and Dumbrava. As of July 2015 the remaining part of lot 1 was still not usable, as the next segment containing an exit (Timișoara – Lugoj lot 2) was not opened for traffic. The idea of building a temporary exit at the western end of the segment near Șanovița was discussed but never implemented. Another option discussed, considering that Timișoara – Lugoj lot 2 was awarded to the same joint venture of companies was a partial opening from Șanovița to Topolovățu Mare interchange with DJ572 (6.02 km), but this was not pursued either.

The bid for the design & build contracts for the remaining three segments that are part of this section was launched by CNADNR during April 2012. After more than one year after the bid was launched, the Ilia – Șoimuș segment (22.1 km) was awarded to a joint venture composed of Romanian companies Spedition UMB and Tehnostrade in July 2013, while the Dumbrava – Coșevița segment (28.6 km) was awarded to a joint venture composed of Italian companies Salini Impregilo and Secol, and the Coșevița – Ilia segment (21.1 km) was awarded to a joint-venture led by the Spanish company Comsa, both in October 2013. Constructions works for lots 2, 3 and 4 were planned to finish in May 2016, however the lots face multiple issues: a revision of the environmental study imposed a number of changes to structures among which the requirement for a number of ecoducts for protecting the large carnivore fauna in the area, which called for an additional bid to cover for the changes; on lot 4 an illegal cemetery was discovered on the path of the motorway and was relocated, the motorway route was passing by too close to a cave near Brănișca which was supposedly housing a significant bat population protected by law and there were discussions between Spedition UMB and CNADNR regarding a potential change of the technical solution in the area of the Mintia ash and clay deposit. In an interview given by the general manager of CNADNR during August 2015, it was announced that the problems on lot 4 were now cleared and Spedition UMB was praised for their approach and pace of work on the segment, the appreciation being that if the issues hadn't surfaced most probably the works would have been completed by end of 2015.

On 6 March 2017, a part of lot 2, between Dumbrava and Margina was opened to traffic.

By April 2019, the physical progress was at 95.8% on lot 2 (except tunnels), 94% on lot 3 and 95% on lot 4. The bid for the new planned tunnels on lot 2, claimed publicly since December 2014, was finally announced in June 2019.

On 14 August 2019, lot 4 of the motorway was opened, whereas the lot 3 was opened on 23 December, same year, with speed and tonnage restrictions. Both restrictions on the latter were lifted gradually throughout the following year. In October 2022, the remainder segments of lot 2 were signed with Spedition UMB. This section was supposed to be finished by 2026, but has since been delayed to 2028. 11 months would be for the project phase, and 45 months for the execution.

=== Lugoj – Timișoara ===
This section of the motorway is fully operational and is composed of two segments: Giarmata – Izvin (lot 1) and Izvin – Șanovița (lot 2).

The Timișoara bypass (9.5 km, also referred to as the Timișoara – Lugoj lot 1) was awarded in April 2011 to the Romanian company Spedition UMB. It was opened to traffic in October 2012.

The stretch between Timișoara and Lugoj (25.6 km, referred to as the Timișoara – Lugoj lot 2) has been re-auctioned in August 2012, after appeals from participants at the previous auction. It has been awarded to the joint venture between the Italian companies Tirrena Scavi and Societa Italiana Per Condotte D'Acqua in December 2013. Construction works have been completed seven months earlier than the contractual deadline and the segment became operational in December 2015.

=== Timișoara – Arad ===
This section of the motorway is fully operational and is composed of two segments: Timișoara – Arad and Arad bypass.

Works for the Arad bypass (12.25 km) were awarded in March 2009 to the joint venture between the Spanish company FCC Construccion and the Austrian company Porr. The segment was opened in on a single carriageway December 2011, and on both carriageways in June 2012.

The 32.25 km section of motorway between Arad and Timișoara was awarded in December 2008 to the joint venture between the Spanish company FCC Construccion and the Italian company Astaldi. It was opened along with the Arad bypass in December 2011.

=== Arad – Nădlac ===
The construction of the 38.8 km section between Nădlac and Arad was split into two parts. The first part, between Nădlac and Pecica (22.2 km), was awarded in April 2011 to a consortium led by the Romanian company Romstrade, while the second section, between Pecica and Arad (16.6 km), was to be constructed by the Austrian company Alpine. Works started in October 2011 and were due to be finalized in April 2013.

However, the contract for the first part of the section was terminated by the Romanian government in November 2012, due to low construction progress recorded by the Romstrade company (approximately 15–20%) and potential fraud by the company owner. Also, the contract for the second part (construction progress approximately 85%) was terminated in July 2013, because the Austrian company filed for bankruptcy. The first segment was re-auctioned in April 2013, and awarded in December 2013 to the joint venture of Astaldi and Max Bögl. Works should be completed until the end of 2014. A tender for the remaining works on the second segment was announced in June 2014, and the section was finally awarded to the same joint venture of Astaldi and Max Bögl.

The section between Nădlac and Pecica and 6.30 km of the section between Pecica and Arad ware opened ahead of schedule on December 19, 2014. The remainder of the Pecica – Arad segment (10.3 km) was opened on 11 July 2015.

At the western end, the motorway connects with Hungary's M43 motorway, which further connects with the M5 motorway, that runs from the border with Serbia to the capital city of Budapest. A connecting road between the motorway (near the border crossing) and the town of Nădlac (approximately 7 km southbound), designated as DN7G, has also been built.

== Openings timeline ==
- Bucharest – Pitești (South) (95.9 km) was opened on 12 April 1972 partially, 11 September 1972 for all traffic.
- Pitești bypass (South – Bascov) (13.6 km) was opened on 19 November 2007.
- Sibiu bypass (17.5 km) was opened on 1 December 2010.
- Arad – Timișoara (44.5 km) was opened on 17 December 2011. Arad bypass (12.25 km) was initially opened on a single carriageway and completed on 6 June 2012.
- Timișoara – Lugoj lot 1 (9.5 km) was opened on 23 October 2012.
- Deva – Simeria segment (15.4 km) was opened on 21 December 2012.
- Simeria – Orăștie segment (17.4 km) was opened on 30 May 2013.
- Orăștie – Sibiu lots 1, 2 and 4 (59.9 km) were opened on 19 December 2013.
- Lugoj – Deva segment 1 (17.4 km) was opened on 23 December 2013, between the interchange with the A6 motorway (near Balinț) and the exit at Dumbrava.
- Orăștie – Sibiu lot 3 (22.1 km) was opened on 14 November 2014, but closed down completely for repairs on 7 September 2015.
- Nădlac – Arad segment 1 and 6.30 km of segment 2 (28.5 km) were opened on 19 December 2014.
- Nădlac – Arad remainder of lot 2 (10.3 km), junction with Hungarian M43 motorway and border control facility were opened on 11 July 2015.
- Timișoara – Lugoj lot 2 (25.6 km) along with Lugoj – Deva remainder of segment 1 (10.1 km) were opened on 23 December 2015.
- Orăștie – Sibiu segment 3 (22.1 km) was re-opened on 10 October 2016, after repairing works had reportedly been completed.
- Lugoj – Deva lot 2 was partially opened (15.2 km) on 6 March 2017.
- Lugoj – Deva lot 4 (22.13 km) was opened on 14 August 2019.
- Lugoj – Deva lot 3 (21 km) was opened on 23 December 2019.
- Pitești – Sibiu lot 1 (13.1 km) was opened on 15 December 2022.
- Pitești – Sibiu lot 5 first section (15.77 km) was opened on 13 December 2024.
- Pitești – Sibiu lot 5 second section (14.57 km) was opened on 11 June 2025.

=== Incomplete sections ===
- Pitești – Sibiu lot 4 is actively being built, while lots 2 and 3 have certain segments in design and some already being actively built.
- Lugoj – Deva lot 2 remaining 13.5 km are currently being built and planned to be opened in 2026.

== Exit list ==
County	Location	km	Junction	Destinations	Notes
Exits and structures (Northbound)
Bucharest – Curtea de Argeș (AG) (141 km)
Bucharest	Bucharest (Iuliu Maniu Boulevard)	10	—		
Bucharest	Bucharest Ring Road	11		CB	Opened 1972
Bucharest	Ciorogârla	13		DJ601	
Bucharest	Chitila / Otopeni; Domnești / 1 Decembrie	18	Interchange	A0	Opened June 2025
Giurgiu	Bolintin Deal	22			
Giurgiu	Bolintin area	30	Services	Lukoil, motel, restaurant	
Giurgiu	Bolintin Vale	30		DJ401A	Opened 1972
Giurgiu	Argeș River crossing	35	Bridge	Argeș River	
Giurgiu	Bolintin area	36	Services	Petrom, restaurant, parking	
Giurgiu	Bolintin area	42	Services	Lukoil	Northbound only
Giurgiu	Vânătorii Mici	44		DC162	Opened 1972
Giurgiu	Corbii Mari area	49	Services	OMV / MOL	
Giurgiu	Corbii Mari	49		DJ711A	
Dâmbovița	Restaurant (service area)	56	Services	Restaurant	Northbound only
Dâmbovița	Service area	59	Services	Gazprom	Opened 2013
Dâmbovița	Olteni	63		DC75	
Dâmbovița	Găești	70		DN61	Opened 1972
Dâmbovița	Găești	73		DN61	Northbound entrance, southbound exit
Dâmbovița	Service area	80	Services	MOL, motel, restaurant, parking	
Argeș	Teiu	86		DJ702A	Opened 1972
Argeș	Service area	94	Services	Petrom, motel, restaurant	
Argeș	Căteasca	94		DJ703B	Opened 1972
Argeș	Cireșu	97		DC105	
Argeș	Oarja	102		DJ503	Opened 1972
Argeș	Slatina, Craiova	104	Interchange	DEx12	Opened 2025
Argeș	Pitești South / Slatina, Craiova	106		DN65B DN65	Opened 1972; reconfigured in November 2007 as exit
Argeș	Parking	109	Services	Parking	
Argeș	Argeș River crossing	110	Bridge	Argeș River	
Argeș	Pitești East / Mioveni, Câmpulung, Bucharest	115		DN7 DN73	Opened November 2007
Argeș	Argeș River crossing	118	Bridge	Argeș River	
Argeș	Pitești North / Curtea de Argeș, Râmnicu Vâlcea	120		DN7 DN7C	Opened November 2007
Argeș	Argeș River crossing	129	Bridge	Argeș River	
Argeș	Mănicești / Curtea de Argeș	136		DN7C	Opened December 2024
Argeș	Argeș River crossing	139	Bridge	Argeș River	
Argeș	Argeș River crossing	146	Bridge	Argeș River	
Argeș	Argeș River crossing	150	Bridge	Argeș River	
Argeș	Curtea de Argeș	151		DN73C	Opened June 2025
Boița (SB) – Coșevița (TM) (188 km)
Sibiu	Boița	225	—	DN7	Opened December 2022
Sibiu	Parking	229	Services	Parking	Opened December 2022
Sibiu	Sibiu South / Tălmaciu	238		DN1 DN7	Opened December 2010; reconfigured in December 2022 as exit
Sibiu	Sibiu East / Agnita	243		DJ106	Opened December 2010
Sibiu	Sibiu City Centre	244			Opened December 2010
Sibiu	Sibiu North / Mediaș	247		DN14	Opened December 2010
Sibiu	Sibiu West, Sibiu Airport, Ocna Sibiului	254		DN1T	Opened December 2010; reconfigured in December 2013 as exit
Sibiu	Parking	260	Services	Parking	Opened 2014
Sibiu	Săcel Tunnel	264	Tunnel		Opened 2013
Sibiu	Săliște	269		DN1 DN7	Opened December 2013
Sibiu	Aciliu Viaduct	271	Bridge	Aciliu Viaduct	Opened November 2014
Sibiu	Apoldu de Jos	281		DJ143B	Opened November 2014
Sibiu	Cunța	293		DN1 DN7	Opened December 2013
Sibiu	Parking	296	Services	Parking	Opened 2014
Sibiu	Sebeș East	304		DN1 DN7	Southbound only; opened December 2013
Alba	Alba Iulia, Turda, Cluj-Napoca	308	Interchange	A10	Opened July 2021
Alba	Sebeș North / Alba Iulia	309		DN1	Opened December 2013
Alba	Sebeș West	312		DN7	Opened December 2013
Alba	Parking	316	Services	Parking	Opened 2014
Hunedoara	Orăștie	335		DN7	Opened 2013
Hunedoara	Parking	340	Services	Parking	Opened 2013
Hunedoara	Simeria, Călan / Hațeg	353		DN7 DN66	Opened December 2012
Hunedoara	Mureș River	355	Bridge	Mureș River	Opened 2012
Hunedoara	Deva / Șoimuș	368		DN7 DN76	Opened 2012
Hunedoara	Parking	389	Services	Parking	Opened August 2019
Hunedoara	Ilia, Săvârșin	391		DN7	Opened August 2019
Hunedoara	Dobra	402		DN68A	Opened December 2019
Hunedoara	Parking	409	Services	Parking	Opened December 2019
Hunedoara	Coșevița	411		DN68A	Opened December 2019
Margina (TM) – Nădlac (AR) (158 km)
Timiș	Margina	425	—	DN68A	Opened March 2017
Timiș	Parking	428	Services	Parking	
Timiș	Dumbrava / Traian Vuia	441		DN68A	Opened December 2013
Timiș	Parking	447	Services	Parking	Opened 2014
Timiș	Lugoj	458	Interchange	A6	Opened December 2013
Timiș	Timiș–Bega Channel	465	Bridge	Timiș – Bega Channel	Opened December 2015
Timiș	Bega River	467	Bridge	Bega River	Opened December 2015
Timiș	Parking	471	Services	Parking	Opened December 2015
Timiș	Topolovățu Mare / Lipova, Buziaș	474		DJ572	Opened December 2015
Timiș	Parking	481	Services	Parking	Under construction
Timiș	Timișoara South / Moravița, Belgrade	493	Interchange	A9	Planned
Timiș	Timișoara East, Timișoara Airport / Lugoj	494		DN6	Opened October 2012
Timiș	Parking	500	Services	Parking	Opened 2012
Timiș	Timișoara North / Lipova	503		DJ691	Opened December 2011
Timiș	Orțișoara / Seceani	516		DJ693	Opened 2013
Timiș	Parking	530	Services	Parking	Opened 2014
Arad	Arad South	536		DN69	Opened December 2011
Arad	Arad / Zădăreni, Sânnicolau Mare	538		DJ682	Opened June 2012
Arad	Mureș River	540	Bridge	Mureș River	Opened 2011
Arad	Arad City Centre, Arad Airport	542		DJ682F	Opened June 2012
Arad	Arad North, Oradea	545	Interchange	A11	Opened 2011; reconfigured in July 2015 as interchange
Arad	Pecica	556		DN7	Opened December 2014
Arad	Parking	559	Services	Parking	Opened 2015
Arad	Nădlac	582		DN7G	Opened December 2014; last exit in Romania
Arad	Nădlac – Csanádpalota border crossing	584	Border	M43 motorway (Hungary)	Opened July 2015
