= Balinț =

Balinț Bálinc
- Commune
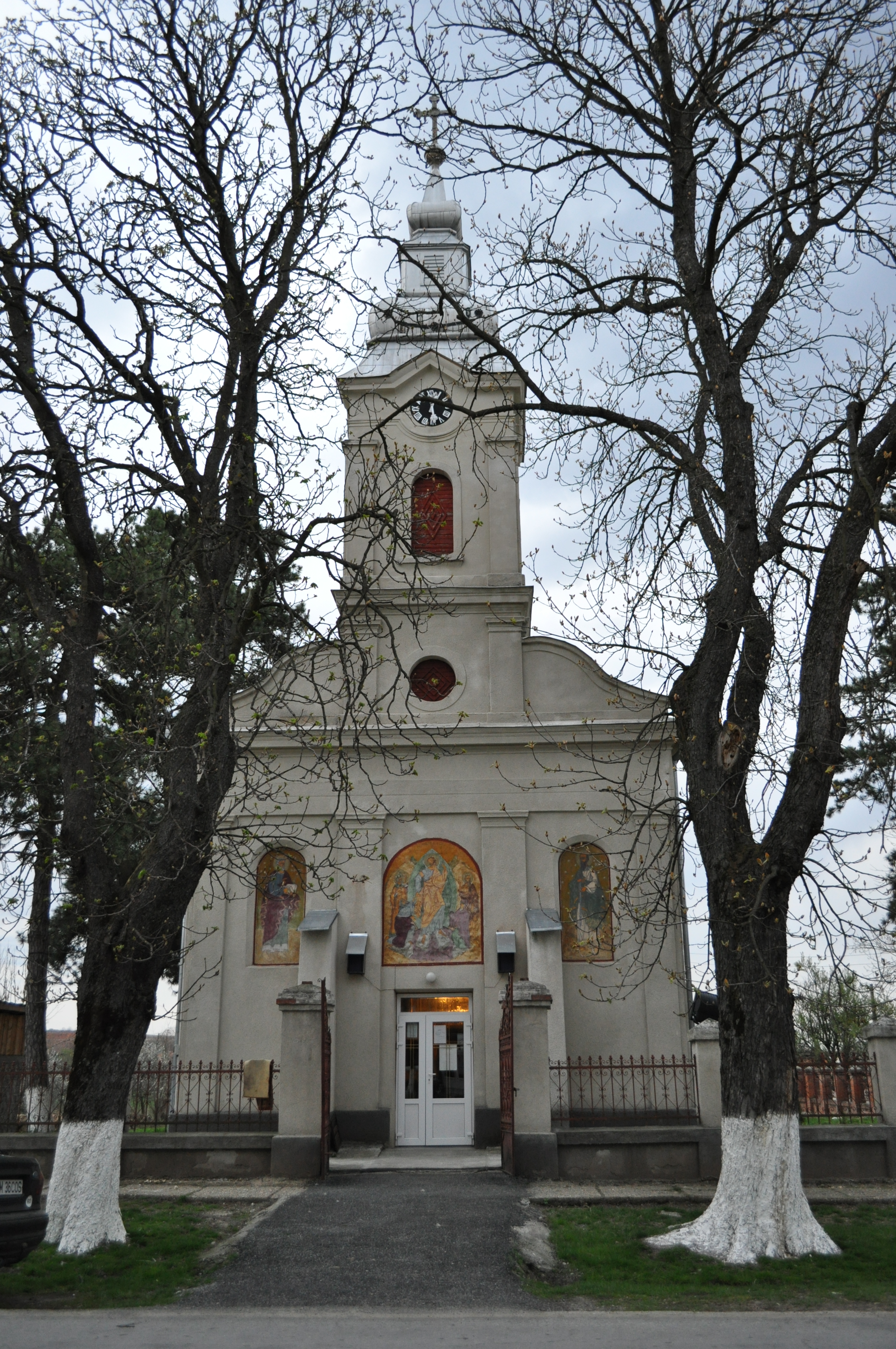
- Church of the Resurrection in Balinț

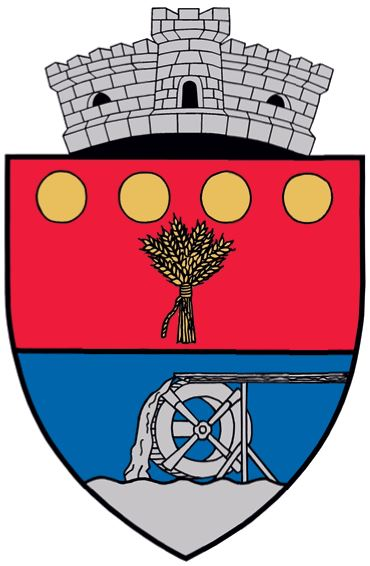
- Coat of arms

- Location in Timiș County

- Location in Romania
- Coordinates: 45°49′42″N 21°52′22″E
- Country: Romania
- County: Timiș

Government
  - Mayor (2024–): Andrei-Dumitru Popa (USR)
- Area: 55.6 km^{2} (21.5 sq mi)
- Population (2021-12-01): 1,489
  - Density: 26.8/km^{2} (69.4/sq mi)
- Time zone: UTC+02:00 (EET)
  - Summer (DST): UTC+03:00 (EEST)
- Postal code: 307005–307008
- Vehicle reg.: TM
- Website: www.primariabalint.ro

Balinț (Hungarian: Bálinc; German: Balintz or Balintin; Serbian: Балинц, romanized: Balinc) is a commune in Timiș County, Romania. It is composed of four villages: Balinț (commune seat), Bodo, Fădimac, and Târgoviște. It borders Bara to the north, Coșteiu to the south, Belinț and Ghizela to the west, and Bethausen to the east.

== History ==
=== Balinț ===
In the 7th century, Balinț was a village community led by a Daco-Roman chief named Balu. The community took its name from this leader. With the arrival of the Slavs during the same period, most village communities along the middle course of the Bega River underwent Slavic influence. The name "Balinț" originates from the root Bal (the chief's name), combined with the Slavic suffix -inț.

Since the 10th–11th centuries, there have been numerous floods on the middle course of the Bega River. Balinț, being located 500 meters (1,600 ft) from the Bega riverbed, was periodically flooded. In the 11th century, some of the villagers moved to a hearth protected from floods. A new village appears, derived from the first, Balințul de Sus (Upper Balinț), located in the Church valley, and Balințul de Jos (Lower Balinț) remains on the old hearth.

The first recorded mention of Balinț dates from 1488, when Count Ferenc Haraszti donates the Felsewbalyncz estate to his daughter. By 1554 the two settlements merged under the name Balynch. In 1604, around Balinț, there are battles between the troops of George I Rákóczi and the rebels of Stephen Bocskai (future Prince of Transylvania) and Gabriel Bethlen. Balinț is mentioned in the documents from 1690 and 1717, meaning that it continued to exist during the Turkish occupation. At the 1717 census it had 20 houses. In 1739 Austrian troops retaliated against the villagers who supported the Turks during the Austro-Turkish War of 1737–1739 and took part in the uprising. The villages of Balinț, Fădimac, and Târgoviște were burned down by the imperial armies. By 1740 the Austrians set new hearths for the burned villages.

Jewish merchant families and German craftsmen settled in Balinț in 1880. The Lugoj–Ilia railway was put into use in 1897, and a train station was built in Balinț.

At the end of the 19th century, Balinț was the seat of the Béga District of the Krassó-Szörény County; it was a small village with Romanian, German, and Hungarian inhabitants and had a post and telegraph office, as well as a sawmill.

=== Bodo ===
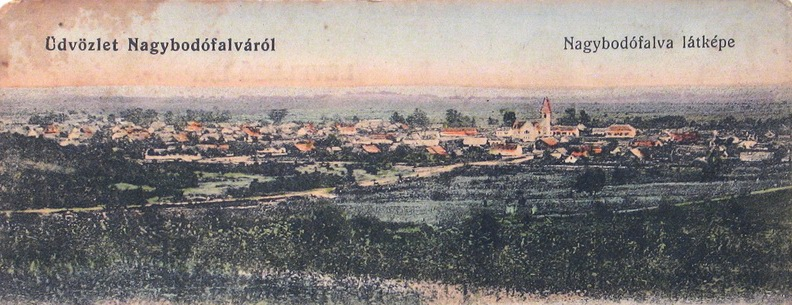
Postcard from the 1900s, showing the view of Nagybodófalva/Bodo

Bodo (Hungarian: Nagybodófalva; German: Boddau) seems to have existed since at least the 14th century, mentioned by the name Bodov in 1344. Later, in 1401, a certain Bodofalva is mentioned. However, the village itself was founded only in 1890, by Hungarian colonists who settled near the Romanian village of Păru, forming the current hearth of the village. Between 1880 and 1890, more than 50 Hungarian families settled here, most of them from the Debrecen area. It was named Andrásfalva for a while, in honor of András Bethlen, its founder. For a short period after the union of Banat with Romania, the village was called Bodofalva, while the Romanians also called it Bodăul Mare.

=== Fădimac ===
The first recorded mention of Fădimac (Hungarian: Fagymag; German: Fadmak) can be considered a diploma from 1488 where the name Fagymag appears. From the period 1500–1550 there are numerous other Hungarian and Turkish documents attesting the village under different derived names. The village has always been Romanian and was located on the hill to the north of the village. After conquering Banat, the Austrians named it Vitigmak. At the 1717 census it appeared with 23 houses and was owned by the state.

=== Târgoviște ===
The first recorded mention of Târgoviște (Hungarian: Vásáros; German: Tergowest) dates from 1690 in Marsigli's notes. The village is probably older, since the traces of a medieval earth fortification were discovered here.

== Demographics ==
Ethnic composition (2021)
1. Romanians (69.6%)
2. Hungarians (23.0%)
3. Ukrainians (1.27%)
4. Unknown (4.83%)
5. Others (1.30%)
Religious composition (2021)
1. Orthodox (63.5%)
2. Reformed (19.1%)
3. Greek Catholics (3.89%)
4. Pentecostals (3.49%)
5. Roman Catholics (3.29%)
6. Unknown (4.96%)
7. Others (1.24%)
8. Irreligious, atheists and agnostics (0.53%)

Balinț had a population of 1,489 inhabitants at the 2021 census, down 6.71% from the 2011 census. Most inhabitants are Romanians (69.64%), larger minorities being represented by Hungarians (22.96%) and Ukrainians (1.27%). For 4.83% of the population, ethnicity is unknown. By religion, most inhabitants are Orthodox (63.53%), but there are also minorities of Reformed (19.07%), Greek Catholics (3.89%), Pentecostals (3.49%) and Roman Catholics (3.29%). For 4.96% of the population, religious affiliation is unknown.

Census		Ethnic composition
Year	Population	Romanians	Hungarians	Germans	Roma	Ukrainians
1880	2,208	1,962	96	146	–	–
1890	2,411	2,166	98	118	–	–
1900	3,868	2,360	1,367	118	–	–
1910	4,903	2,338	2,368	132	–	–
1920	4,164	2,005	2,073	84	–	–
1930	4,018	2,087	1,763	92	47	–
1941	3,732	2,073	1,482	95	–	–
1956	3,309	1,925	1,329	43	5	–
1966	2,987	1,918	1,028	32	–	2
1977	2,523	1,687	817	13	3	–
1992	1,849	1,260	558	5	25	–
2002	1,751	1,181	477	7	68	16
2011	1,596	1,102	373	–	35	13
2021	1,489	1,037	342	–	13	19

== Politics and administration ==
The commune of Balinț is administered by a mayor and a local council composed of 11 councilors. The mayor, Andrei-Dumitru Popa, from the Save Romania Union, has been in office since 2024. As from the 2024 local elections, the local council has the following composition by political parties:

Party	Seats	Composition
Social Democratic Party	3	
Save Romania Union	3	
Democratic Alliance of Hungarians in Romania	1	
National Liberal Party	1	
Ind.	1	
S.O.S. Romania	1	
Alliance for the Union of Romanians	1	

== Notable people ==
- Lídia Fülöp (1925–2017), poet and prose writer
- Crișu Dascălu (b. 1941), poet and essayist

== Gallery ==
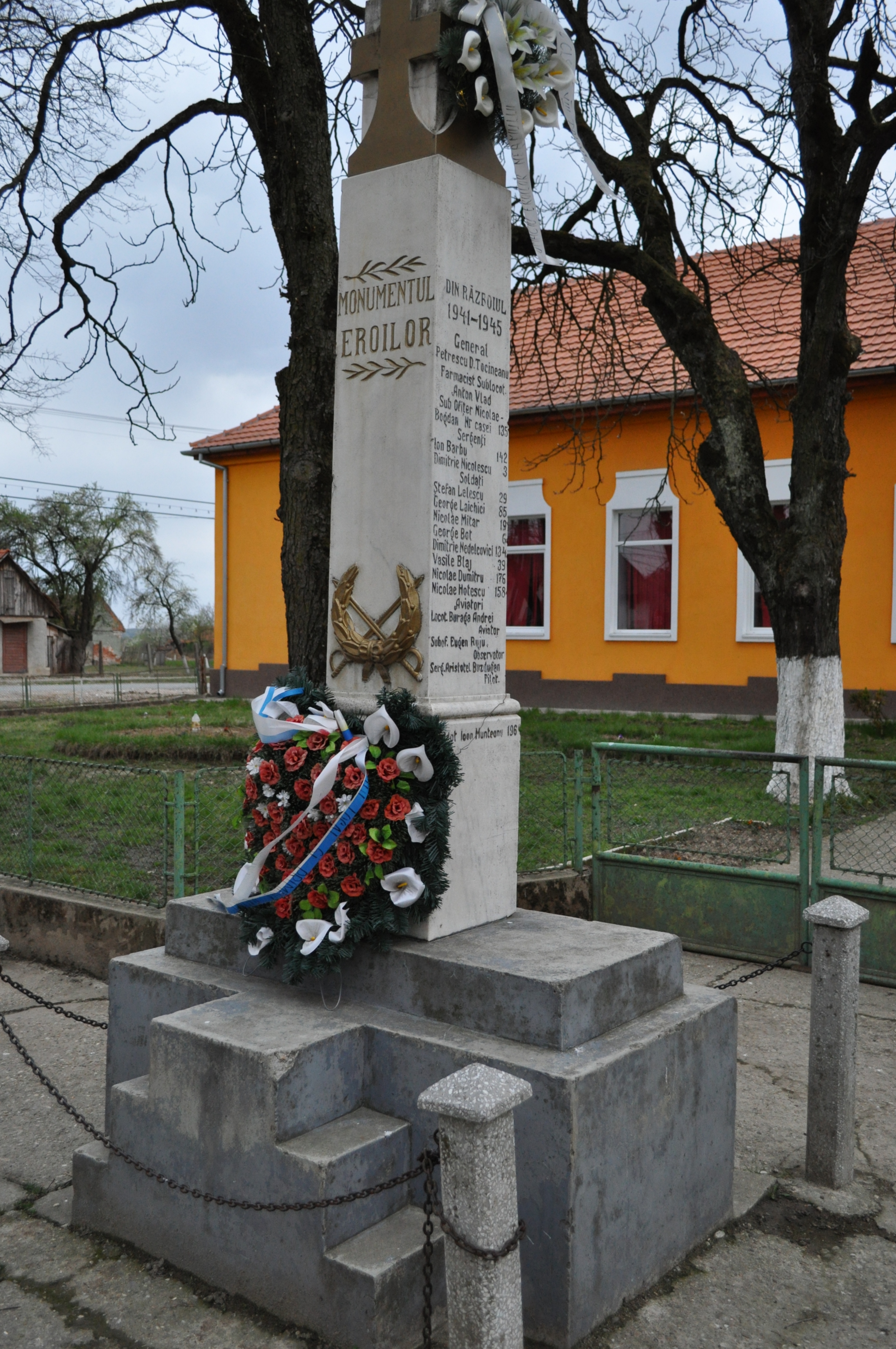
Heroes' Monument in Balinț

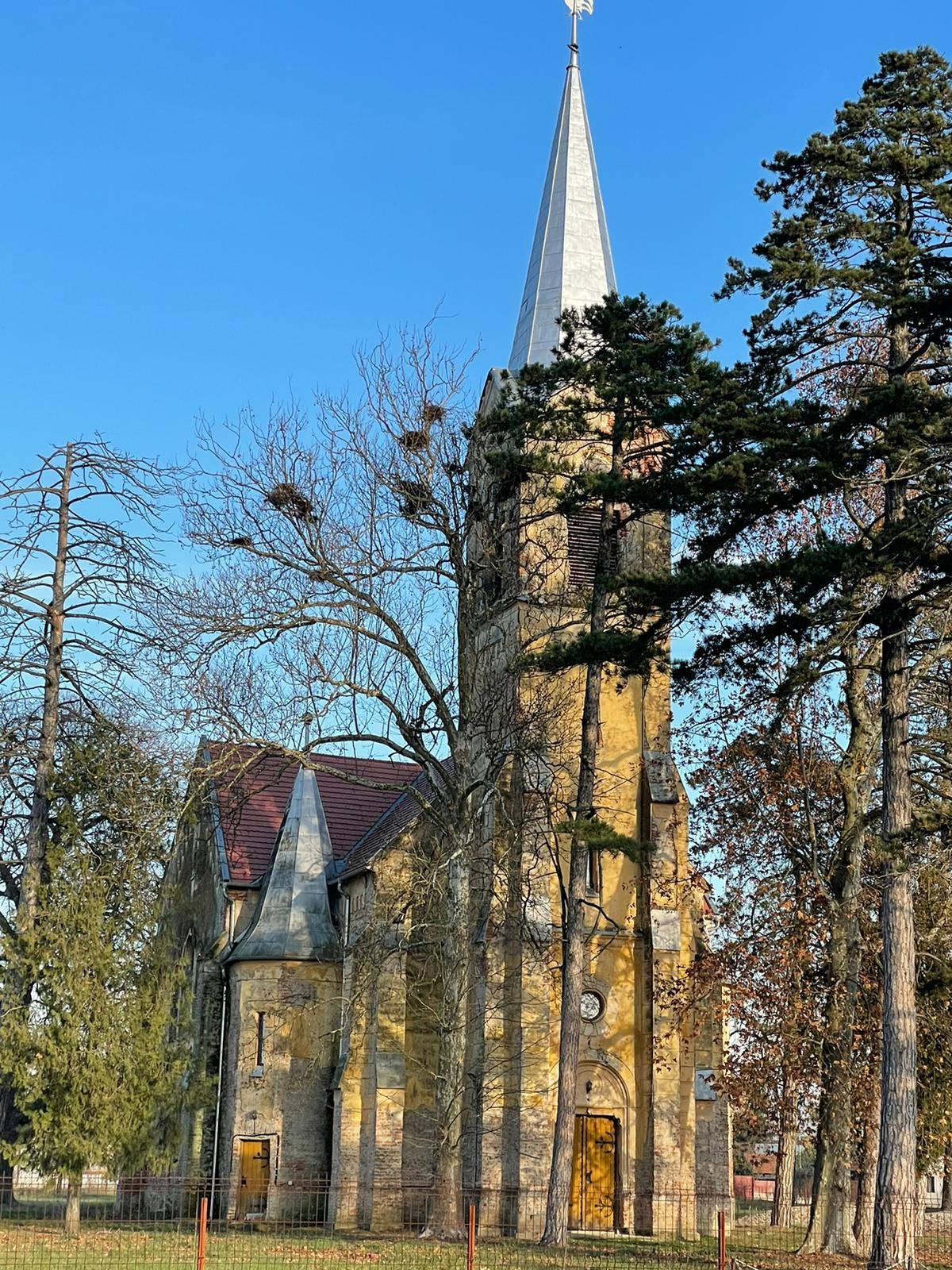
Reformed Church in Bodo

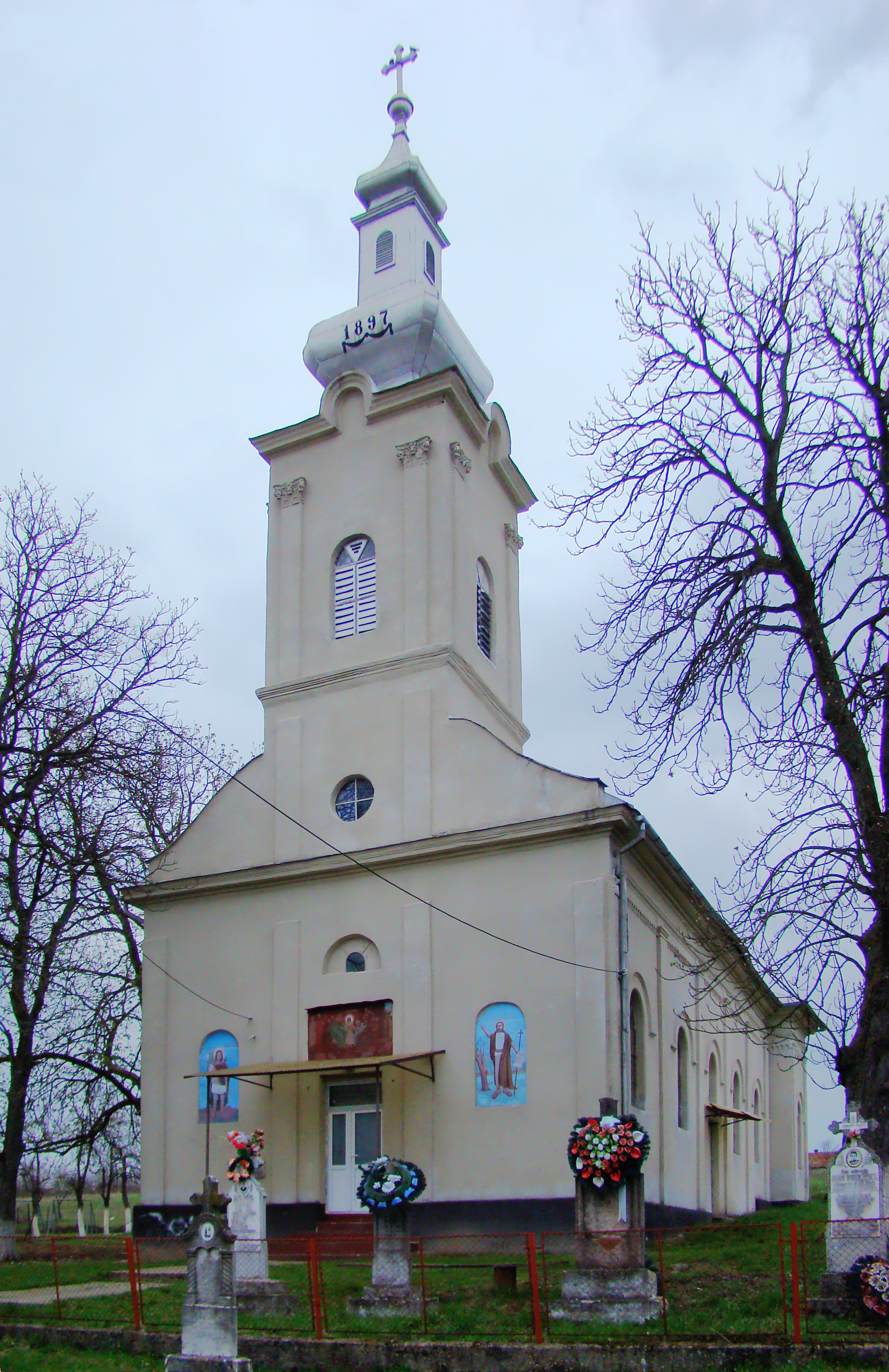
Orthodox Church in Fădimac

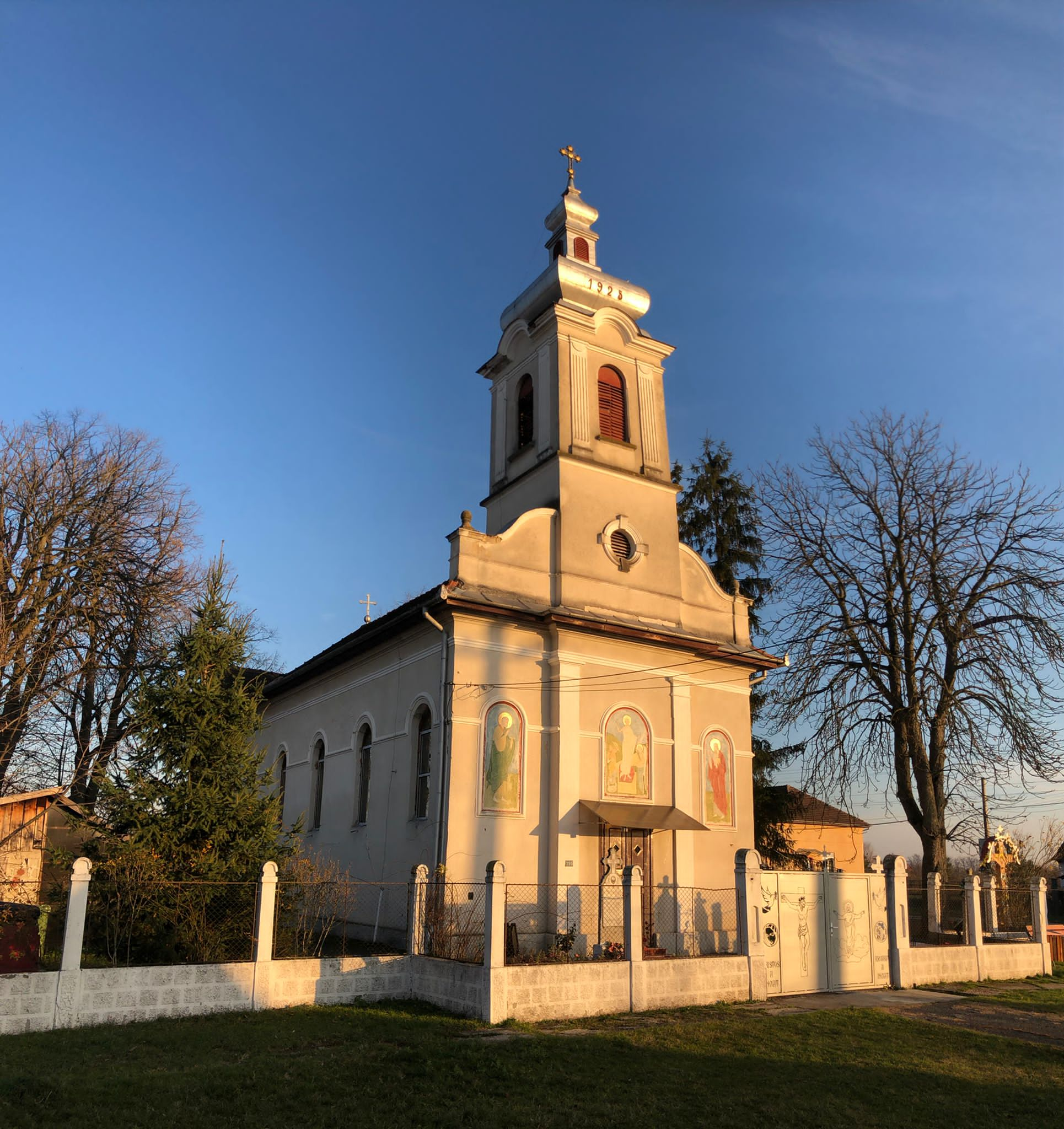
Orthodox Church in Târgoviște
