= Belinț =

- Commune
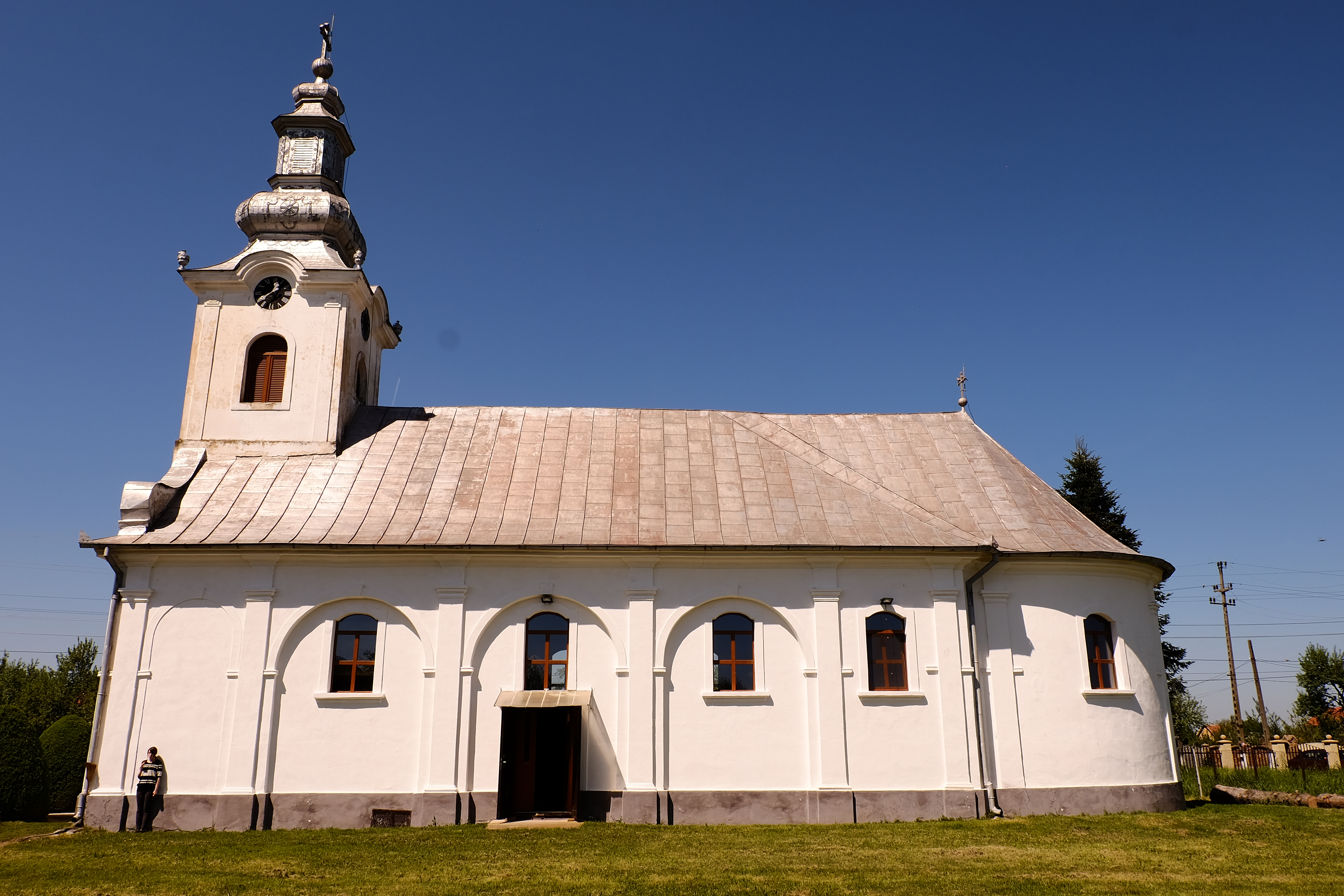
- Orthodox church in Chizătău

- Location in Timiș County

- Location in Romania
- Coordinates: 45°45′13″N 21°45′58″E
- Country: Romania
- County: Timiș

Government
  - Mayor (2020–): Laurențiu-Ionel Tîrziu (PNL)
- Area: 50.94 km^{2} (19.67 sq mi)
- Population (2021-12-01): 2,410
  - Density: 47.3/km^{2} (123/sq mi)
- Time zone: UTC+02:00 (EET)
  - Summer (DST): UTC+03:00 (EEST)
- Postal code: 307045–307048
- Vehicle reg.: TM
- Website: comunabelint.ro

Belinț (Hungarian: Belence; German: Belintz; Serbian: Белинц, romanized: Belinc) is a commune in Timiș County, Romania. It is located between the cities of Timișoara and Lugoj and is composed of four villages: Babșa, Belinț (commune seat), Chizătău and Gruni.

== Geography ==
Located east of the relative center of Timiș County, on DN6, Belinț is 45.5 km (28.3 mi) from Timișoara and 14.5 km (9.0 mi) from Lugoj, the nearest city.

The relief is represented on about a third of the commune's territory by a hilly area, part of the Lipova Hills, located north of the Bega River, with an altitude of 150–180 m (490–590 ft) and by a plain area, part of the Timiș Plain, in the southern part of the area, in the form of an alluvial-proluvial stoop located between the Lipova Hills and the right bank of Timiș River, with altitudes between 105–110 m (344–361 ft) in the vicinity of Chizătau and 111–140 m (364–459 ft) in the Gruni–Babșa area.

The main watercourses are represented by Timiș and Bega rivers; Miniș, Hisiaș and Glavița streams, as well as the Timiș–Bega supply canal, complete the hydrographic network. Bega, Miniș and Hisiaș also collect the waters of erosion valleys and torrential elements in the hilly area, which have in common large flow fluctuations, maximums being recorded mainly due to spring and early summer rainfall. The current hydrographic aspect is the result of important hydro-ameliorative and hydrotechnical works, started in 1728, which resulted, among other, in the canalization of Bega and the damming of the minor riverbed of Timiș.

== History ==
=== Belinț ===
Belinț has been inhabited since prehistoric times and was built in the vicinity of the ancient settlement of Tapia. In the 10th century it belonged to Voivodeship of Glad and then to the medieval district of Bel. The first recorded mention of Belinț dates from 1285 (Becl). In 1369 it is documented under the name Belenche, as property of the Beșan family. Within the commune there was also the village of Tătăraș, and the Ottoman defters from the 16th century speak about two localities: Belințul de Jos ("Lower Belinț") and Belințul de Sus ("Upper Belinț"), belonging to the Horasty (Horescu) family. Count Mercy's map shows Belinț inhabited by Romanians, belonging to the district of Lugoj. In 1782, Nicolae Defcics and Mihai Conrad bought the locality from the Aerarium, and in 1892 it became the property of the Iankovici (Doctorovics) family. In 1786 the village of Darva (today, a street in Belinț) is founded by the Romanians displaced from Darova by the German, Hungarian and Slovak settlers.

=== Babșa ===
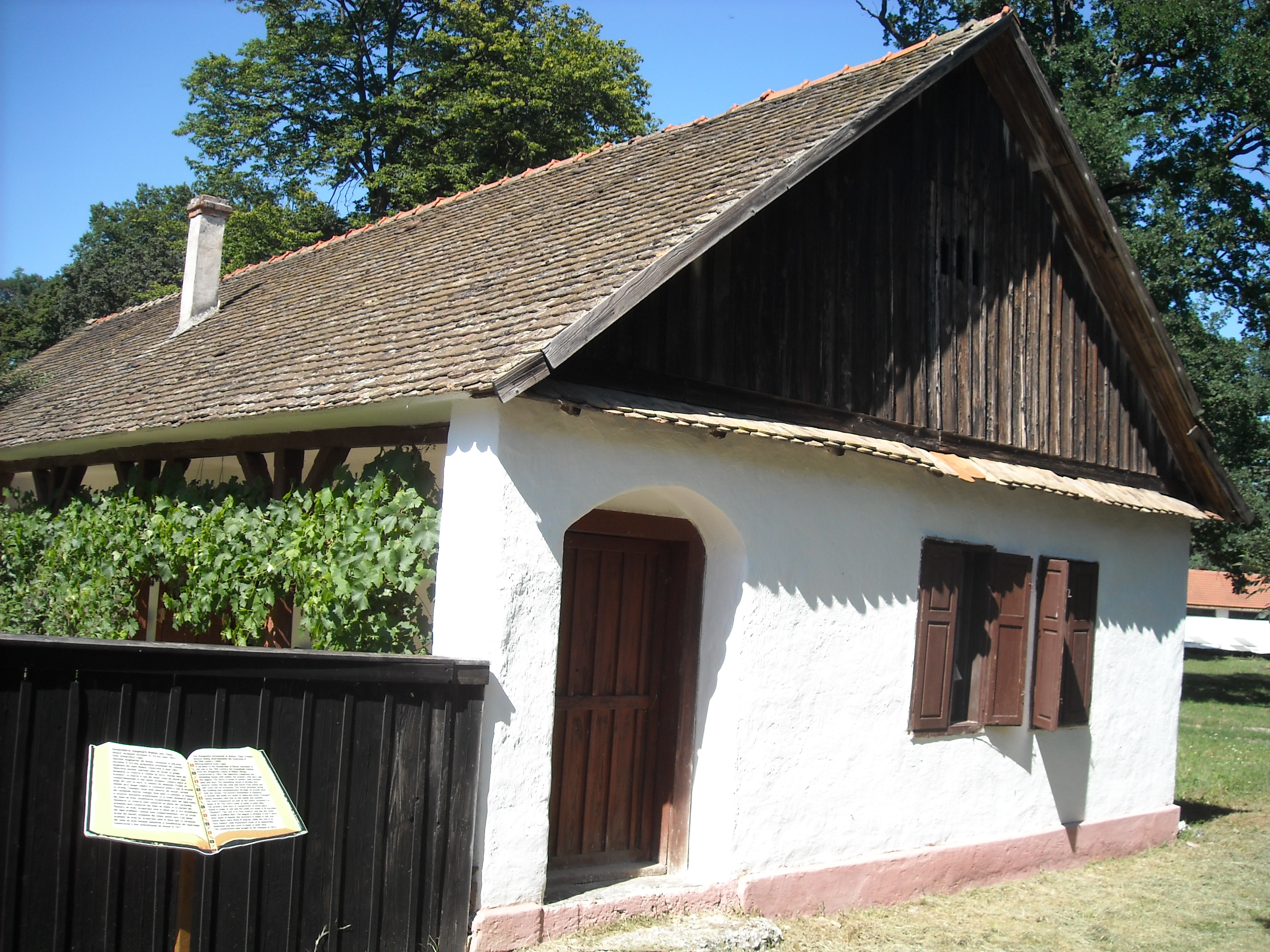
Ethnic Hungarian household from Babșa in the Banat Village Museum

Babșa is first mentioned in a noble diploma from 1488. Whereas at that time Babșa consisted of three small localities – Babșa Superioară ("Upper Babșa"), Babșa Inferioară ("Lower Babșa", on the left side of the Bega River) and Babșa Mijlocie ("Middle Babșa", on the right side of the Bega River) – it can be concluded that Babșa dates back to before 1400. The three small villages were definitively unified before 1800. Babșa was and is a village inhabited by Romanians. During the Middle Ages, it passed through the hands of several owners, such as the noble family Czikó in 1488 or Ferenc Horozath, Count of Arad, in 1510. In an Ottoman defter from 1554, it is recorded with 42 houses. Marsigli's notes (1690–1700) mention Babșa as belonging to the district of Lunca Lipovei. The Austrian conscription from 1717, the year of their conquest of Banat, mentions that Babșa had 40 houses. Count Mercy's map from 1723 places Babșa in the district of Făget, and Korabinsky's dictionary from 1786 in the district of Lugoj. Until the middle of the 18th century, the village was scattered on both banks of the Bega River, but, due to frequent floods, the hearth moved further north, on a promontory, and the component hamlets joined. The locals also moved the old wooden church. It was demolished between 1893 and 1896, being replaced with the current, brick-made one. In 1906 a Hungarian colony was founded in Babșa. A total of 55 houses were built and settled with Hungarians from northern Hungary and southern Slovakia. The colony has declined over time and is now on the verge of disappearing. Most of the houses were abandoned or demolished, and most of the inhabitants moved to the city. In the 1970s, one of the Hungarian households was taken to the Banat Village Museum in Timișoara.

=== Chizătău ===
First documented in 1359, under the name Kyzigtew ("Little Pool" (Romanian: Tăul Mic) or "Acrid Pond" (Romanian: Balta Acră)), Chizătău is mentioned in numerous medieval Hungarian diplomas, then in Habsburg documents after the conquest of Banat from under the Turkish rule. According to tradition, the old hearth of the village was "În Deal", to the right of Bega, but after the withdrawal of water from the valley where the current hearth is located, the village moved permanently to the new location. Located on the "big road" between Timișoara and Lugoj, the village was heavily influenced by commercial traffic, its importance increasing after 1867, when the railway between the two cities was inaugurated. In 1896, the Chizăteiana bank was established, and in 1911, the industrial railway between Chizătău and Șanovița was inaugurated, facilitating the transport of basalt from the quarries from Șanovița. Chizătău was an independent commune until 1956, when it was transferred to the administration of Belinț.

=== Gruni ===
Gruni is an old Romanian settlement, first documented in 1453, in a document by which King Ladislaus IV of Hungary donated it to John Hunyadi. In 1717 it had 18 houses and belonged to the district of Făget. In the interwar period it was part of Plasa Lugoj, Severin County.

== Demographics ==
Ethnic composition (2021)
1. Romanians (89.5%)
2. Others (10.5%)
Religious composition (2021)
1. Orthodox (83.0%)
2. Pentecostals (5.14%)
3. Unknown (10.1%)
4. Others (1.80%)

Belinț had a population of 2,410 inhabitants at the 2021 census, down 13.59% from the 2011 census. Most inhabitants are Romanians (89.46%). By religion, most inhabitants are Orthodox (82.98%), with a minority of Pentecostals (5.14%). For 10.08% of the population, religious affiliation is unknown.

| Census | | Ethnic composition |
| Year | Population | Romanians | Hungarians | Germans |
|---|---|---|---|---|
| 1880 | 6,590 | 6,308 | 71 | 169 |
| 1890 | 6,307 | 6,034 | 68 | 183 |
| 1900 | 6,092 | 5,739 | 182 | 154 |
| 1910 | 6,176 | 5,432 | 518 | 165 |
| 1920 | 5,287 | 4,733 | 355 | 156 |
| 1930 | 4,981 | 4,476 | 329 | 130 |
| 1941 | 4,781 | 4,310 | 264 | 157 |
| 1956 | 4,356 | 4,102 | 181 | 57 |
| 1966 | 4,331 | 4,170 | 96 | 48 |
| 1977 | 4,098 | 3,998 | 46 | 33 |
| 1992 | 3,055 | 2,965 | 46 | 17 |
| 2002 | 3,045 | 2,990 | 31 | 18 |
| 2011 | 2,789 | 2,662 | 31 | 14 |
| 2021 | 2,410 | 2,156 | 8 | – |

== Politics and administration ==
The commune of Belinț is administered by a mayor and a local council composed of 11 councilors. The mayor, Laurențiu-Ionel Tîrziu, from the National Liberal Party, has been in office since 2020. As from the 2024 local elections, the local council has the following composition by political parties:

| Party | Seats | Composition |
|---|---|---|
| National Liberal Party | 8 | |
| Social Democratic Party | 2 | |
| Save Romania Union–People's Movement Party–Force of the Right | 1 | |

== Culture ==
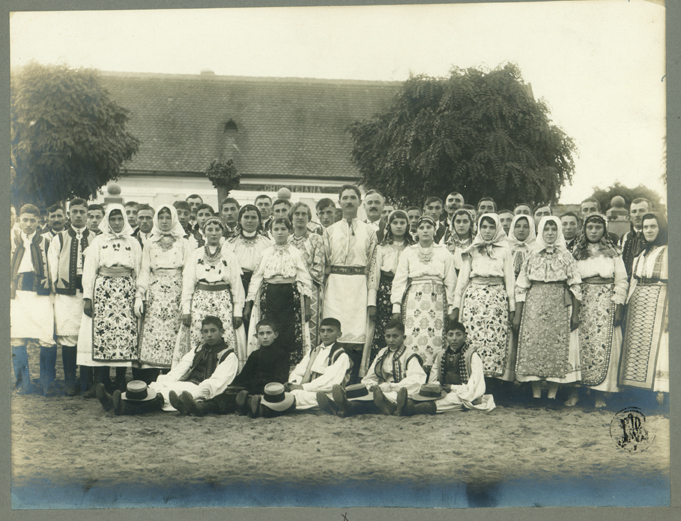
The Belinț choir at the beginning of the 20th century

Belinț has rich cultural traditions. Chizătău is home to the oldest choir in Romania, the Plowmen's Choir, founded in 1840 by a local priest. The Plowmen's Choir's repertoire includes songs inspired by folklore, as well as secular and religious acapella works, from doinas and carols to Renaissance madrigals and Byzantine music. The Plowmen's Choir is currently led by the priest from Chizătău. In the past, Belinț boasted a theater troupe (1896), a chorus (1882) and a traditional dance group (1905). Nowadays, cultural institutions from the Belinț commune are represented by the community centers in Babșa, Belinț, Chizătău and Gruni and the communal library in Belinț.

== Notable people ==
- Constantin Rădulescu (1824–1895), chief engineer of Timișoara and mayor of Lugoj
- Nicolae Coșariu (1842–1903), lawyer, journalist, owner of Gazeta poporului and founder of Banca Timișeană
- Horia Căciulescu (1922–1989), actor
- Simion Dănilă (b. 1943), linguist, translator and literary historian
