= Aciliu Viaduct =

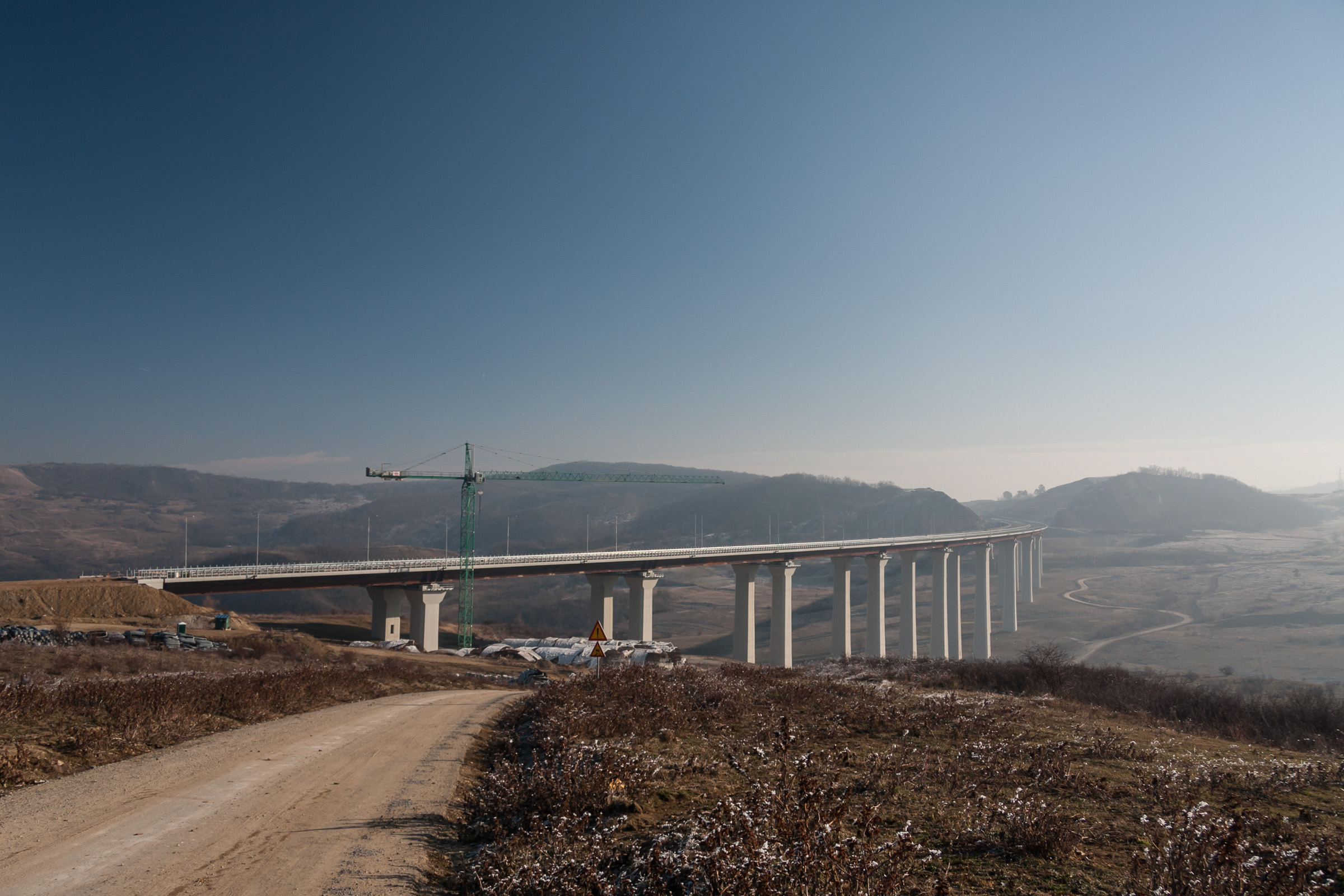
- Coordinates: 45°49′31″N 23°51′57″E
- Carries: Motorway four lanes
- Locale: between Orăștie and Sibiu

Characteristics
- Total length: 1,100 m

History
- Opened: 2014

The Aciliu Viaduct is a viaduct located on the route of the 82 km (51 mi) long Orăștie-Sibiu section of the A1 Motorway between Orăștie in Hunedoara County and Sibiu in Sibiu County, Romania. More precisely it is located between the commune of Apoldu de Jos and the town of Săliște both located in Sibiu County in central Romania.

The viaduct is one of the largest structures along the length of the A1 Motorway and is the longest and the highest viaduct in Romania. It is a traditional piled structure with a length of 1,100 m (3,600 ft) with 14 spans of 78 m (256 ft) each and a width of 24 m (79 ft). The pylons had to be concreted in the bedrock at a depth of 40 m (130 ft) below the surface because of the frequent landslides in the area. The fifth pylon is the highest of the structure, reaching 80 m (260 ft) from top to bottom.

The structure's deck is constructed out of 20 copper combined reinforced steel U-beams weighing an average 385 tonnes each, with the largest weighing up to 400 tonnes, resulting in a total steel usage of around 8000 tonnes for the entire structure. Each of the 20 U-beams has a length of 55 m (180 ft) and comprises 88 different sections welded together onsite. The company responsible for the construction of the Aciliu viaduct is Impregilo subcontractor Collini. The total cost of the 22 km (14 mi) highway section containing the viaduct, which runs between Cunța and Săliște, is around €142 million.

== See also ==
- A1 Motorway
- Roads in Romania
- List of bridges in Romania
