= A11 motorway (Romania) =

Partially built motorway in Romania

A11 motorway

- The A11 motorway connects the A1 motorway with the DN7 national road at the West of the city of Arad.

Route information
- Maintained by Compania Națională de Autostrăzi și Drumuri Naționale din România
- Length: 3.5 km (2.2 mi) 116 km (72 mi) planned
- Existed: 2011–present

Major junctions
- From: A 1 (Arad West Interchange)
- DN7 (Arad North)
- To: A 3 near Oradea (under construction)

Location
- Country: Romania

Highway system
- Roads in Romania; Highways
← A 10	→ DEx12

The A11 motorway (Romanian: Autostrada A11) is a partially built motorway in north-western part of Romania, planned to connect the cities of Arad and Oradea. As of January 2022, the only operational segment is a 3.5-kilometre (2.2 mi) section from Arad West Interchange (A1) to DN7 (Arad North), known as the Arad Bypass (Romanian: Centura Arad).

== History ==
The current segment in service was built as part of the Arad Bypass section of the A1 motorway, which was opened in December 2011 (on a single carriageway) and June 2012 (on both carriageways). In July 2015, when the Arad – Nădlac section of the A1 motorway became operational, it changed its route number from A1 to A11.

Part of the proposed route of Via Carpathia, the motorway is planned to be extended towards Oradea and connected to the A3 motorway, having 2x2 lanes on 43 km and 3x3 lanes on 14 km. The other 76 km are planned to be built under the expressway (DX) standards.

In early 2022, Hungary expressed its interest for an eventual connection of the A11 near Salonta to its M44 motorway, towards Kecskemét.

As of December 2022, the northern segment was under construction. This segment will connect the A3 motorway with the Oradea south bypass road.

== Exit list ==
County	Location	km	mi	Destinations	Notes
Arad	Arad	0	0.0	A 1 – Nădlac, Timișoara	Southern terminus
Arad	Arad	3	1.9	DN7 – Arad, Turnu	Temporary northern terminus
Missing connection North towards Oradea
Bihor	Oradea	116	72	A 3 – Oradea	Proposed northern terminus
1.000 mi = 1.609 km; 1.000 km = 0.621 mi: Unopened
