= Slătioara, Olt =

Slătioara
- Commune
- Seal

- Location in Romania
- Coordinates: 44°24′N 24°19′E
- Country: Romania
- County: Olt
- Area: 17.69 km^{2} (6.83 sq mi)
- Population (2021-12-01): 2,912
  - Density: 164.6/km^{2} (426.3/sq mi)
- Time zone: UTC+02:00 (EET)
  - Summer (DST): UTC+03:00 (EEST)
- Vehicle reg.: OT

Slătioara is a commune in Olt County, Oltenia, Romania. It is composed of two villages, Salcia and Slătioara.
