= DN6 =

Road in Romania

National Road 6
- Drumul Național 6

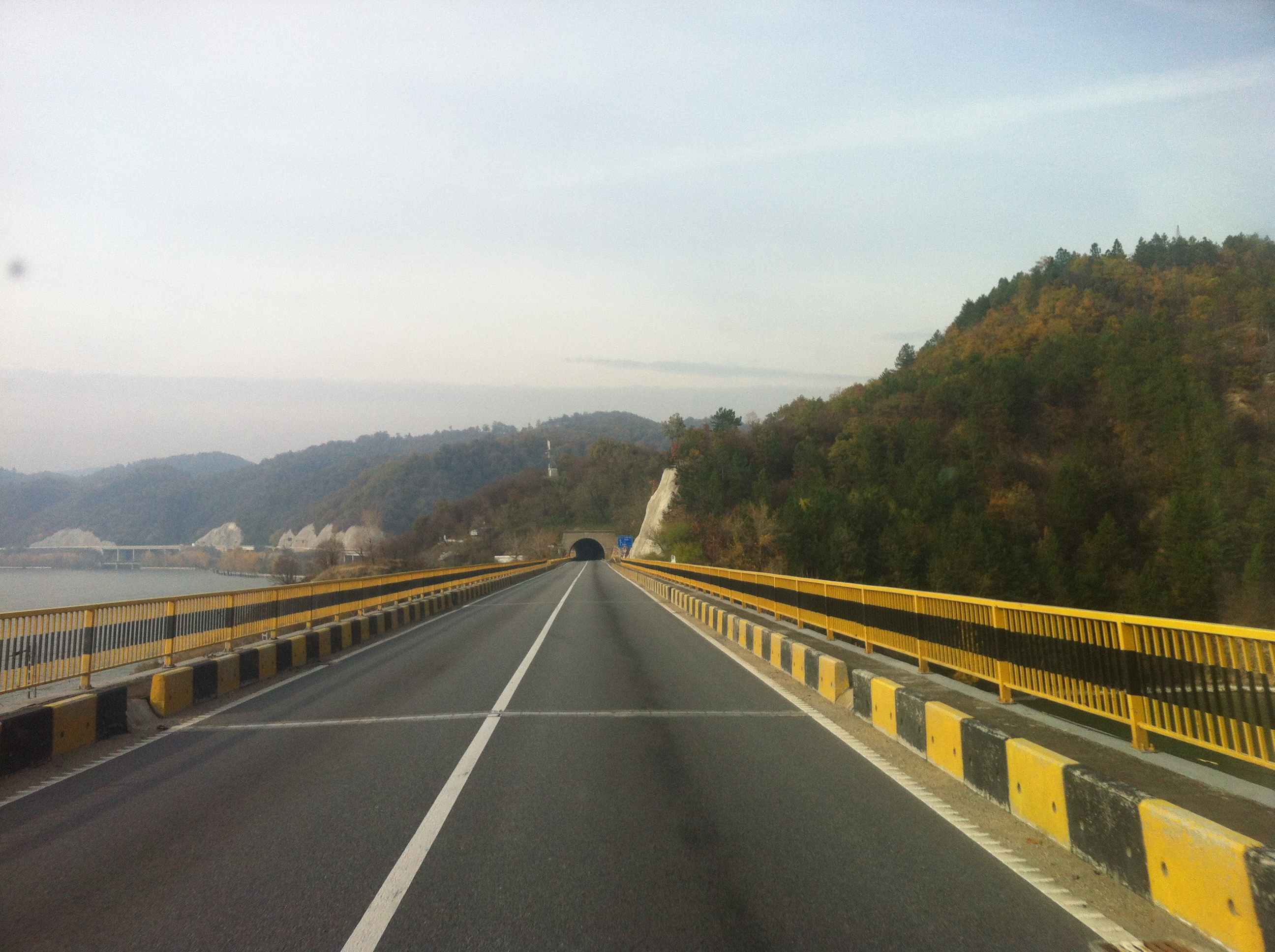

Route information
- Part of E70
- Maintained by Compania Națională de Autostrăzi și Drumuri Naționale din România
- Length: 639 km (397 mi)

Major junctions
- From: Bucharest
- List: DN61 at Ghimpați; DN5B at Ghimpați; DN51 at Alexandria; DN52 at Alexandria; DN65A at Roșiorii de Vede; DN54 at Caracal; DN64 at Caracal; DN56 at Craiova; DN65 at Craiova; DN6B at Craiova; DN66 at Filiași; DN67A at Strehaia; DN56A at Șimian; DN67 at Drobeta-Turnu Severin; DN6A near Porțile de Fier I; DN57 at Orșova; DN67D at Pecinișca; DN57B near Plugova; DN68 at Caransebeș; DN58 at Caransebeș; DN58A at Lugoj; DN68A at Lugoj; A1 near Remetea Mare; DN59 at Timișoara; DN69 at Timișoara; DN59C at Sânnicolau Mare
- To: Cenad (Hungarian border)

Location
- Country: Romania
- Counties: Ilfov, Giurgiu, Teleorman, Olt, Dolj, Mehedinți, Caraș-Severin, Timiș
- Major cities: Bucharest, Alexandria, Caracal, Craiova, Drobeta-Turnu Severin, Timișoara

Highway system
- Roads in Romania; Highways

DN6 (Romanian: Drumul Național 6) is a national road in Romania which links Bucharest with the Banat region in the western part of the country and further to the East-European capitals Budapest and Belgrade via the border with Hungary near Cenad. It is a very traveled road.

The national road passes through the following municipalities: Alexandria, Caracal, Craiova, Drobeta-Turnu Severin, Caransebeș, Lugoj and Timișoara. Near Gura Văii the road is linked by the road DN6A to the Serbian road network via a dam on the Danube (Porțile de Fier I).
