= Ghizela =

- Commune
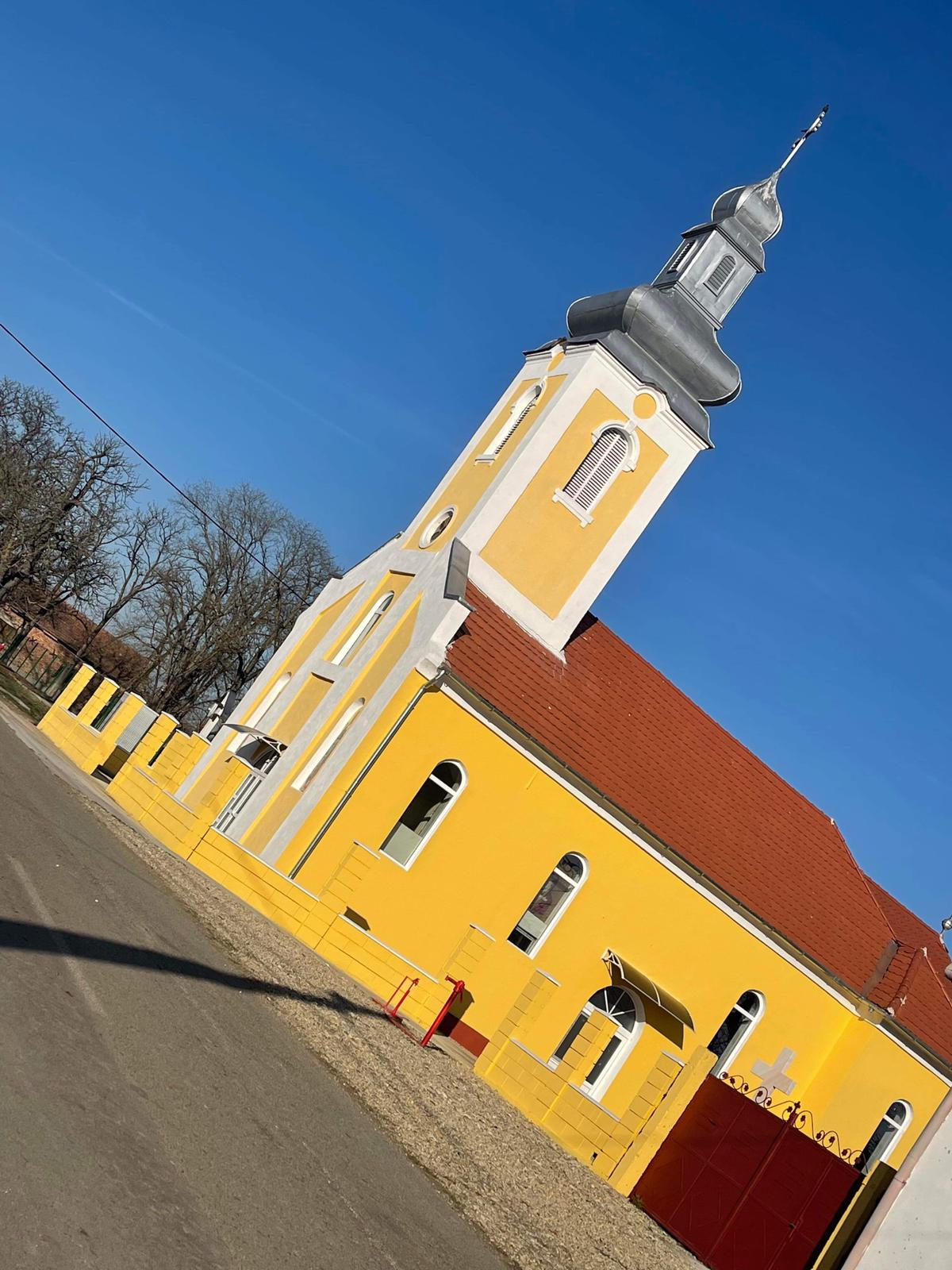
- The church in Paniova

- Location in Timiș County

- Location in Romania
- Coordinates: 45°49′N 21°44′E
- Country: Romania
- County: Timiș
- Established: 1880

Government
  - Mayor (2024–): Ștefan-Ciprian Cenușe (PSD)
- Area: 92.07 km^{2} (35.55 sq mi)
- Population (2021-12-01): 1,113
  - Density: 12.09/km^{2} (31.31/sq mi)
- Time zone: UTC+02:00 (EET)
  - Summer (DST): UTC+03:00 (EEST)
- Postal code: 307205–307208
- Vehicle reg.: TM
- Website: www.primariaghizela.ro

Ghizela (Hungarian: Gizellafalva; German: Giseladorf; Serbian: Гизела, romanized: Gizela) is a commune in Timiș County, Romania. It is composed of four villages: Ghizela (commune seat), Hisiaș, Paniova and Șanovița.

== History ==
Ghizela was founded by German colonists in 1880. The journey they took to settle here was a longer one. They came from Giselahein (near Pančevo, in the Serbian Banat), where they had settled in 1868. But before that they had come from the village of Molydorf (near Zrenjanin, now disappeared), founded by the first German colonists in 1832. The first generation of colonists was from Alsace and Lorraine. The new settlement was located on cleared land that belonged to Babșa and Șanovița. The name was given after the village of Giselahein, where the German colonists had come from. In 1906 a second wave of colonization took place, this time with 45 Hungarian families. They formed a separate colony, and the Hungarian state built them a Catholic church in 1909.

The first recorded mention of Hisiaș dates from 1410, when it is mentioned that it was part of the Duboz domain, together with four other localities. It may have disappeared completely during the Turkish period. The name Hiziasch, in the district of Făget, reappears on Count Mercy's map from 1723. It was said that the inhabitants, Romanians, would have resettled here during the reign of Queen Marie, the Orthodox parish being established in 1770. In 1779 it was attached to Temes County and became the property of the Aerarium.

Paniova is first mentioned in Marsigli's notes from 1690 under the name Panjeva. After the conquest of Banat by the Austrians, at the first census conducted by the Habsburg authorities in 1717, the locality appears recorded with 20 houses; it is called Bangeva and belongs to the Făget District. Until 1812 it was owned by the Aerarium, from which it was bought by the Demelich family. In 1896, colonizations were made with Roman Catholic Germans, but in a smaller proportion than in other localities in Banat, the majority Romanian character remaining unchanged. However, the Germans formed an important community, reaching 40% by 1900.

According to historian Coriolan Suciu, the first recorded mention of Șanovița dates from 1359, in a document where it appears with the name of Sasanfalva ("Sasan's village"). Historian Nicolae Ilieșiu considers that the village dates back to the Turkish period. The Austrian census of 1717 records the village of Seschenovaz with 40 houses, belonging to the Făget District. The inhabitants were mostly Romanians, but there were also Serbs, especially in the medieval past. In 1779 it was attached to Temes County and at the same time the Orthodox church was built.

== Demographics ==
Ethnic composition (2021)
1. Romanians (92.7%)
2. Unknown (5.75%)
3. Others (1.53%)
Religious composition (2021)
1. Orthodox (86.2%)
2. Roman Catholics (3.23%)
3. Baptists (1.43%)
4. Pentecostals (1.16%)
5. Unknown (6.01%)
6. Others (0.85%)
7. Irreligious, atheists and agnostics (1.07%)

Ghizela had a population of 1,113 inhabitants at the 2021 census, down 3.64% from the 2011 census. Most inhabitants are Romanians (92.72%). For 5.75% of the population, ethnicity is unknown. By religion, most inhabitants are Orthodox (86.25%), but there are also minorities of Roman Catholics (3.23%), Baptists (1.43%) and Pentecostals (1.16%). For 6.01% of the population, religious affiliation is unknown.

Census		Ethnic composition
Year	Population	Romanians	Hungarians	Germans
1880	2,205	2,105	20	48
1890	3,153	2,069	82	988
1900	4,106	2,202	68	1,810
1910	4,197	2,189	410	1,504
1920	3,715	1,961	363	1,348
1930	3,598	1,963	314	1,150
1941	3,638	1,970	312	1,066
1956	2,820	1,859	217	734
1966	2,505	1,829	199	461
1977	1,949	1,595	125	215
1992	1,311	1,223	54	22
2002	1,302	1,219	52	14
2011	1,155	1,071	29	6
2021	1,113	1,032	11	3

== Politics and administration ==
The commune of Ghizela is administered by a mayor and a local council composed of 9 councilors. The mayor, Ștefan-Ciprian Cenușe, from the Social Democratic Party, has been in office since 2024. As from the 2024 local elections, the local council has the following composition by political parties:

Party	Seats	Composition
Social Democratic Party	4	
National Liberal Party	4	
Save Romania Union	1	
