= Moravița =

- Commune
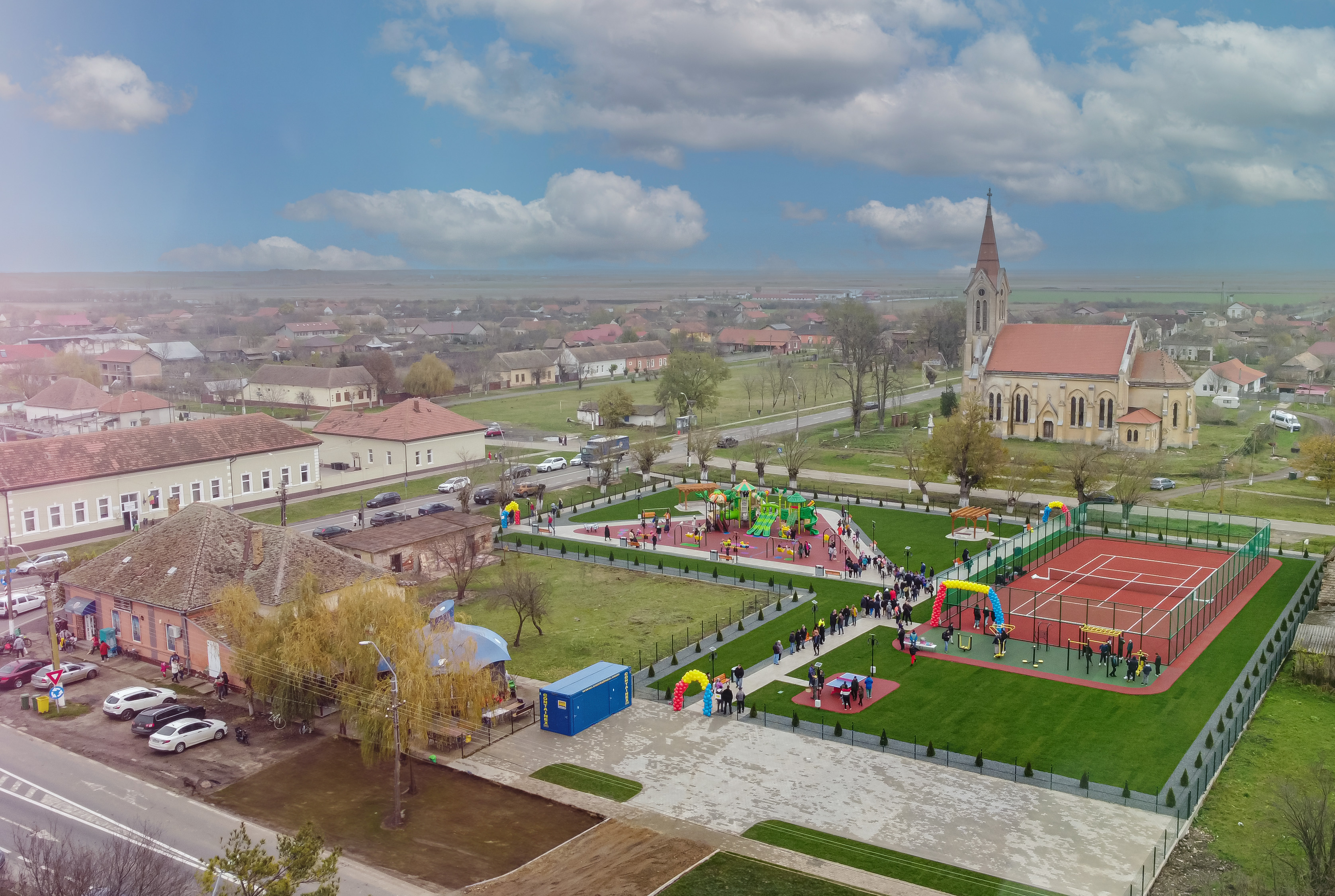

- Location in Timiș County

- Location in Romania
- Coordinates: 45°15′N 21°16′E
- Country: Romania
- County: Timiș

Government
  - Mayor (2020–): Remus-Răzvan Brăzdău (PNL)
- Area: 86.14 km^{2} (33.26 sq mi)
- Population (2021-12-01): 1,990
  - Density: 23.1/km^{2} (59.8/sq mi)
- Time zone: UTC+02:00 (EET)
  - Summer (DST): UTC+03:00 (EEST)
- Postal code: 307280–307283
- Vehicle reg.: TM
- Website: comunamoravita.ro

Moravița (Hungarian: Temesmóra; German: Morawitz; Serbian: Моравица, romanized: Moravica) is a commune in Timiș County, Romania. It is composed of four villages: Dejan, Gaiu Mic, Moravița (commune seat) and Stamora Germană. Moravița is the site of a rail and road border crossing with Serbia.

== History ==
The first recorded mention of Moravița dates from 1333. Hungarian historian Tivadar Ortvay, analyzing the document Incipium rationes decimes sexenallis coletae in Hungaria an ano 1332 ad 1337, found today in the Vatican Library, concludes that Mora (Mura), which appears in this document, refers to Moravița. Ortvay claims that at that time the settlement had a Catholic church. In 1337, due to a flood of the Moravița brook, the locals from Mora were to retreat on the hills of Butin, then forested.

Documents from 1492, 1494 and 1496 speak about the existence of two distinct localities: Tothmura ("Slovak Mura", inhabited by Slovaks, present-day Stamora Germană) and Magyarmura ("Hungarian Mura", inhabited by Hungarians, present-day Moravița). The two estates were owned by Mihály Csáky's family, bought from Miklós Mathko, who settled Hungarian families here in order to harness the fertile lands. In the mid-15th century, Banat fell under Turkish rule, but Moravița continued its existence. In 1597, several Romanian families from Krassó County settled in Moravița. It was then called Morawa.

During 1722, 1775 and 1784–1787, Moravița was settled in three waves with Germans, with the most consistent one between 1784 and 1787. Zipser Germans (Romanian: țipțeri) coming from Alsace, Lorraine and Luxembourg built 145 new houses here. At the time of colonization the village was mixed (Romanians, Germans and Serbs). Romanians and Serbs are forced to move to the neighboring villages of Dejan (Serbs) and Gherman (Romanians), and their Orthodox church (built in 1782) is handed over to Catholics, who will hold services in it until 1911, when they will build a new Catholic church. The old church was demolished in 1920 and the town hall was built from the resulting materials.

Moravița was given market rights in 1839. During this time, Moravița also received a military garrison in which a Uhlan squadron was stationed. The inauguration of the Timișoara–Moravița–Buziaș railway in 1858 boosted the economic activity and the development of the village.

77 locals, mostly Germans, died during World War I. After the war, the German delegation to the Paris Peace Conference would demand that the entire Banat be incorporated into Romania. The final border was decided later, and on 5 February 1924, the border rectification between Yugoslavia and Romania was made, through which Moravița passed into Romania. The interwar period marked a progress in cultural life, as in 1935 Moravița had two choirs and a brass band, a steam mill and a siphon factory, a people's bank, a post office and a train station.

== Demographics ==
Ethnic composition (2021)
1. Romanians (83.3%)
2. Unknown (14.8%)
3. Others (1.87%)
Religious composition (2021)
1. Orthodox (72.6%)
2. Roman Catholics (6.13%)
3. Pentecostals (4.77%)
4. Unknown (15.3%)
5. Others (1.02%)
6. Irreligious, atheists and agnostics (0.15%)

Moravița had a population of 1,990 inhabitants at the 2021 census, down 13.1% from the 2011 census. Most inhabitants are Romanians (83.31%). For 14.82% of the population, ethnicity is unknown. By religion, most inhabitants are Orthodox (72.61%), but there are also minorities of Roman Catholics (6.13%) and Pentecostals (4.77%). For 15.32% of the population, religious affiliation is unknown.

Census		Ethnic composition
Year	Population	Romanians	Hungarians	Germans	Roma	Serbs
1880	4,000	563	408	2,752	–	266
1890	4,600	684	480	3,179	–	243
1900	4,700	666	600	3,155	–	262
1910	4,759	745	742	2,970	–	284
1920	4,549	710	547	3,033	–	–
1930	4,374	821	563	2,707	19	254
1941	4,190	732	539	2,626	–	–
1956	3,376	1,483	533	1,151	14	186
1966	3,101	1,473	380	1,042	17	158
1977	2,874	1,592	314	794	43	115
1992	2,470	2,012	163	134	74	71
2002	2,393	2,086	122	52	64	48
2011	2,289	1,905	106	40	88	31
2021	1,990	1,658	10	11	3	5

== Politics and administration ==
The commune of Moravița is administered by a mayor and a local council composed of 11 councilors. The mayor, Remus-Răzvan Brăzdău, from the National Liberal Party, has been in office since 2020. As from the 2024 local elections, the local council has the following composition by political parties:

Party	Seats	Composition
National Liberal Party	8	
Social Democratic Party	2	
Alliance for the Union of Romanians	1	
