= Coșteiu =

- Commune
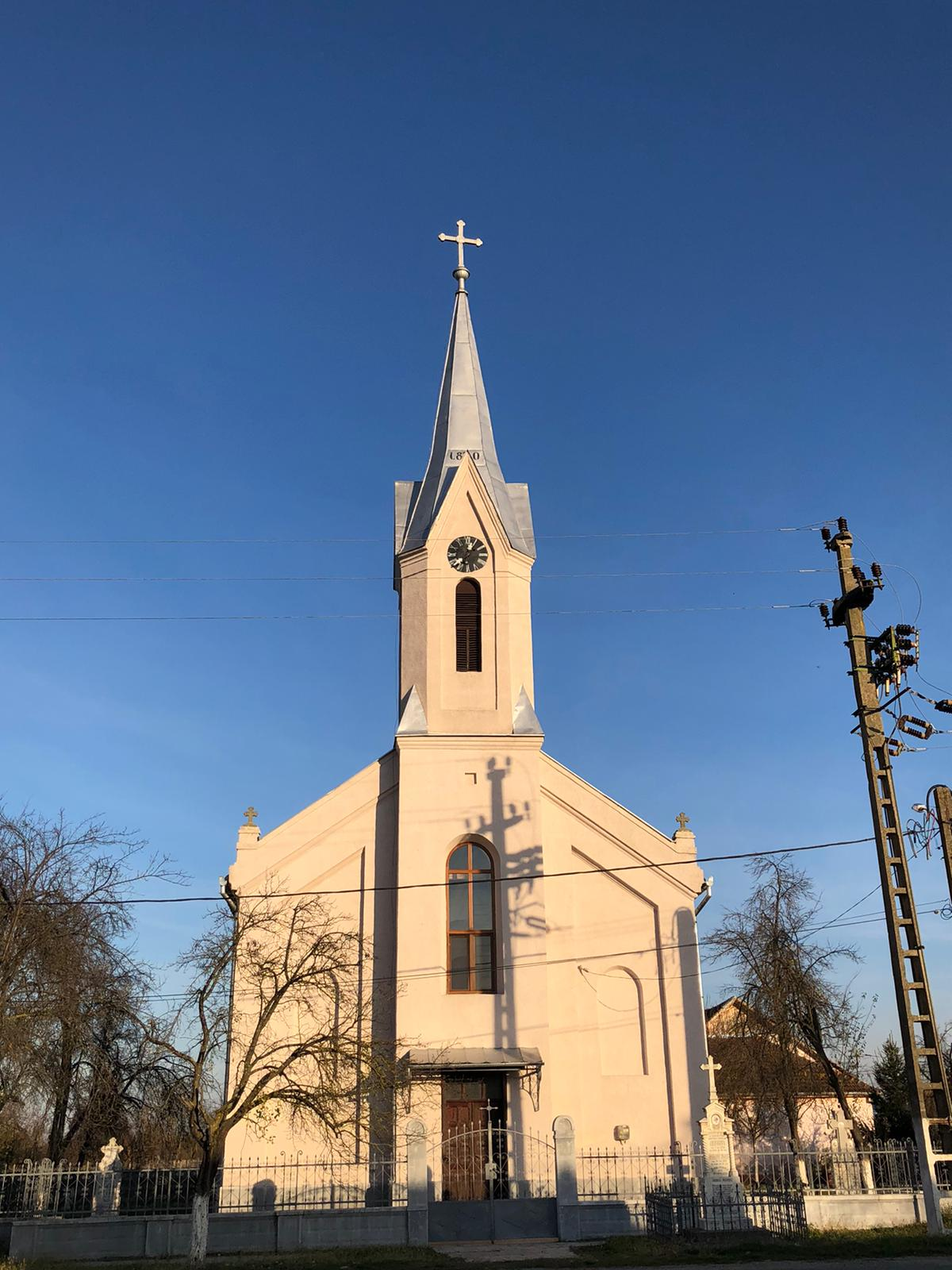
- The Catholic church in Coșteiu

- Location in Timiș County

- Location in Romania
- Coordinates: 45°44′N 21°51′E
- Country: Romania
- County: Timiș

Government
  - Mayor (2004–): Petru Carebia (PSD)
- Area: 84.11 km^{2} (32.48 sq mi)
- Population (2021-12-01): 3,815
  - Density: 45.36/km^{2} (117.5/sq mi)
- Time zone: UTC+02:00 (EET)
  - Summer (DST): UTC+03:00 (EEST)
- Postal code: 307125–307129
- Vehicle reg.: TM
- Website: costeiu.ro

Coșteiu (Hungarian: Kastély; German: Großkostil; Serbian: Коштеј, romanized: Koštej) is a commune in Timiș County, Romania. It is composed of five villages: Coșteiu (commune seat), Hezeriș, Păru, Țipari and Valea Lungă Română. It is located on the right bank of the Timiș River, downstream from Lugoj.

== History ==
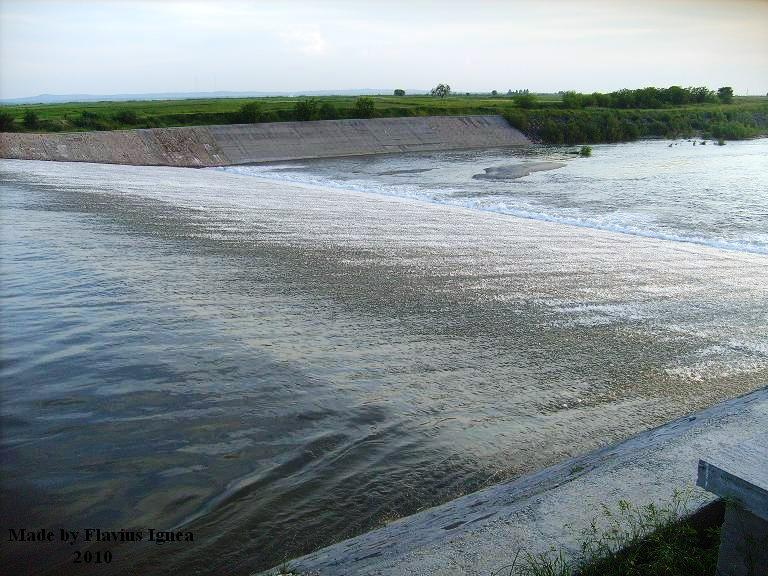
The dam spillway on the Timiș River in Coșteiu

The first recorded mention of Coșteiu dates from 1597. The settlement was formed around a medieval castle known as Kastély, from which its name is derived (in Hungarian kastély means "castle"). On the Josephinische Landesaufnahme of 1717, it was listed under the name Gustik. Today's village was formed by merging three hamlets after 1945: Coșteiu Mare (Hungarian: Nagykastély), Coșteiu Mic (Hungarian: Kiskastély) and Sâlha (Hungarian: Szilha).

The Bega Canal played an important role in the history of Coșteiu. Work on the canal began in 1728. To regularize Bega, Dutch engineer Maximilien Emmanuel Fremaut built a dam near Coșteiu between 1759 and 1760. It was rebuilt in 1860 after the catastrophic floods of the previous year.

== Demographics ==
Ethnic composition (2021)
1. Romanians (77.6%)
2. Hungarians (9.80%)
3. Roma (5.60%)
4. Unknown (6.63%)
5. Others (0.41%)
Religious composition (2021)
1. Orthodox (73.4%)
2. Reformed (6.31%)
3. Pentecostals (4.01%)
4. Greek Catholics (2.77%)
5. Roman Catholics (2.01%)
6. Adventists (1.83%)
7. Baptists (1.23%)
8. Unknown (7.02%)
9. Others (1.22%)
10. Irreligious, atheists and agnostics (0.18%)

Coșteiu had a population of 3,815 inhabitants at the 2021 census, up 4.95% from the 2011 census. Most inhabitants are Romanians (77.56%), larger minorities being represented by Hungarians (9.8%) and Roma (5.6%). For 6.63% of the population, ethnicity is unknown. By religion, most inhabitants are Orthodox (73.42%), but there are also minorities of Reformed (6.31%), Pentecostals (4.01%), Greek Catholics (2.77%), Roman Catholics (2.01%), Adventists (1.83%) and Baptists (1.23%). For 7.02% of the population, religious affiliation is unknown.

| Census | | Ethnic composition |
| Year | Population | Romanians | Hungarians | Germans | Roma |
|---|---|---|---|---|---|
| 1880 | 4,456 | 4,376 | 29 | 47 | – |
| 1890 | 5,343 | 4,127 | 1,119 | 80 | – |
| 1900 | 6,020 | 4,340 | 1,581 | 79 | – |
| 1910 | 6,373 | 4,281 | 2,021 | 34 | – |
| 1920 | 5,557 | 3,816 | 1,729 | 6 | – |
| 1930 | 5,590 | 3,882 | 1,591 | 27 | 61 |
| 1941 | 5,213 | 3,679 | 1,466 | 16 | – |
| 1956 | 4,575 | 3,377 | 1,182 | 7 | 5 |
| 1966 | 4,500 | 3,383 | 981 | 21 | 110 |
| 1977 | 4,535 | 3,642 | 814 | 19 | 53 |
| 1992 | 3,762 | 3,087 | 593 | 14 | 58 |
| 2002 | 3,830 | 3,171 | 501 | 12 | 132 |
| 2011 | 3,635 | 2,912 | 375 | 8 | 84 |
| 2021 | 3,815 | 2,959 | 374 | 7 | 214 |

== Politics and administration ==
The commune of Coșteiu is administered by a mayor and a local council composed of 13 councilors. The mayor, Petru Carebia, from the Social Democratic Party, has been in office since 2004. As from the 2024 local elections, the local council has the following composition by political parties:

| Party | Seats | Composition |
|---|---|---|
| Social Democratic Party | 6 | |
| Save Romania Union | 3 | |
| National Liberal Party | 2 | |
| Democratic Alliance of Hungarians in Romania | 2 | |
