= A8 motorway (Romania) =

Planned motorway in Romania

A8 motorway
- The Union Motorway; Autostrada Unirii

Route information
- Maintained by Compania Națională de Autostrăzi și Drumuri Naționale din România
- Length: 0 km (0 mi; 0 ft) 304.25 km (189.05 mi) planned 260.18 km (161.67 mi) under construction 44.07 km (27.38 mi) tendered

Major junctions
- East end: R 1 at Ungheni (border with Moldova)
- A 7 near Pașcani
- West end: A 3 near Târgu Mureș

Location
- Country: Romania

Highway system
- Roads in Romania; Highways
← A 7	→ A 9

The A8 motorway (Romanian: Autostrada A8), also known as The Union Motorway (Romanian: Autostrada Unirii) or the East-West Motorway (Romanian: Autostrada Est-Vest) is a planned and partially under construction motorway in Romania, that will cross the Eastern Carpathians to connect the historical regions of Moldavia and Transylvania. It will directly link the cities of Iași and Târgu Mureș. The A8 motorway route is an integral part of the Trans-European Transport (TEN-T) Core Network.

== History ==
Early plans estimated the first opening as early as 2009. With a total length of around 300 kilometres (190 mi), and an estimated cost of 4.07 billion €, the motorway will begin from the junction with the A3 motorway near Târgu Mureș, and will run through Sovata, Ditrău, Târgu Neamț, Pașcani, Târgu Frumos and Iași. At its eastern end, the motorway will cross the Prut river at Ungheni to reach Moldova's R1 highway, which further heads east towards Chișinău.

The A8 motorway is divided into five segments: Târgu Mureș – Ditrău segment of 92.2 kilometres (57.3 mi), Ditrău – junction with DN2 segment of 118.61 kilometres (73.70 mi), DN2 – Iași segment of 60.1 kilometres (37.3 mi), Iași Nord bypass segment of 17.7 kilometres (11.0 mi), and Iași – Ungheni border segment (15.47 kilometres (9.61 mi)).

Pre-feasibility studies performed in 2007 were followed by feasibility studies in 2009–2011. As of February 2015, the feasibility study revision and update is being conducted by private contractors. The auction for the execution of the Târgu Mureș - Târgu Neamț segments was expected to be launched in 2021.

== Sections ==
The tenders for two sections (Section 1 - 22 kilometres (14 mi): Târgu Mureș - Miercurea Nirajului, and Section 3 - 30.08 kilometres (18.69 mi): Leghin – Târgu Neamț) were set to be submitted by 27 February 2023 and 28 February 2023 respectively. On 20 September 2023, the contract for the design and execution of the Leghin – Târgu Neamț section (between Vânători-Neamț and Boureni (junction with DN2)) was signed with the SA&PE Construct-Spedition UMB-Tehnostrade association. In February 2024, the contract for the design and execution of the Târgu Mureș - Miercurea Nirajului section was signed with Nurol. The duration of the contracts are 30 months long, 6 months for planning and 24 months for the execution.

The tender for the design and execution of section 1B Miercurea Nirajului - Sărățeni (23.4 kilometres (14.5 mi)) was to be submitted by 22 May 2024, and by 25 June 2024 for section 2C Pipirig – Leghin (19.3 kilometres (12.0 mi)). As of January 2025, four other sections, 1C Sărățeni - Joseni (32.4 kilometres (20.1 mi)), 1D Joseni - Ditrău (14.4 kilometres (8.9 mi)), 2A Ditrău - Grințieș (37.9 kilometres (23.5 mi)), and 2B Grințieș - Pipirig (31.5 kilometres (19.6 mi)) were also under tender.

In March 2025, the contract for the design and execution of the Ditrău - Grințieș section (2A) was signed with the SA&PE Construct-Tehnostrade-Euro Asfalt-Spedition UMB association. The duration of the contract is 54 months long, 14 months for planning and 40 months for the execution.

Until the end of May 2025, two more contracts were signed for the sections 2C Pipirig - Leghin, and 1B Miercurea Nirajului - Sărățeni.

As of May 2026, eleven sections are under design and construction, while the last two remaining sections are tendered.

== See also ==
- Roads in Romania
- Transport in Romania
