= A3 motorway (Romania) =

Partially built motorway in Romania

A3 motorway

- Map of the A3 motorway, as of August 2026

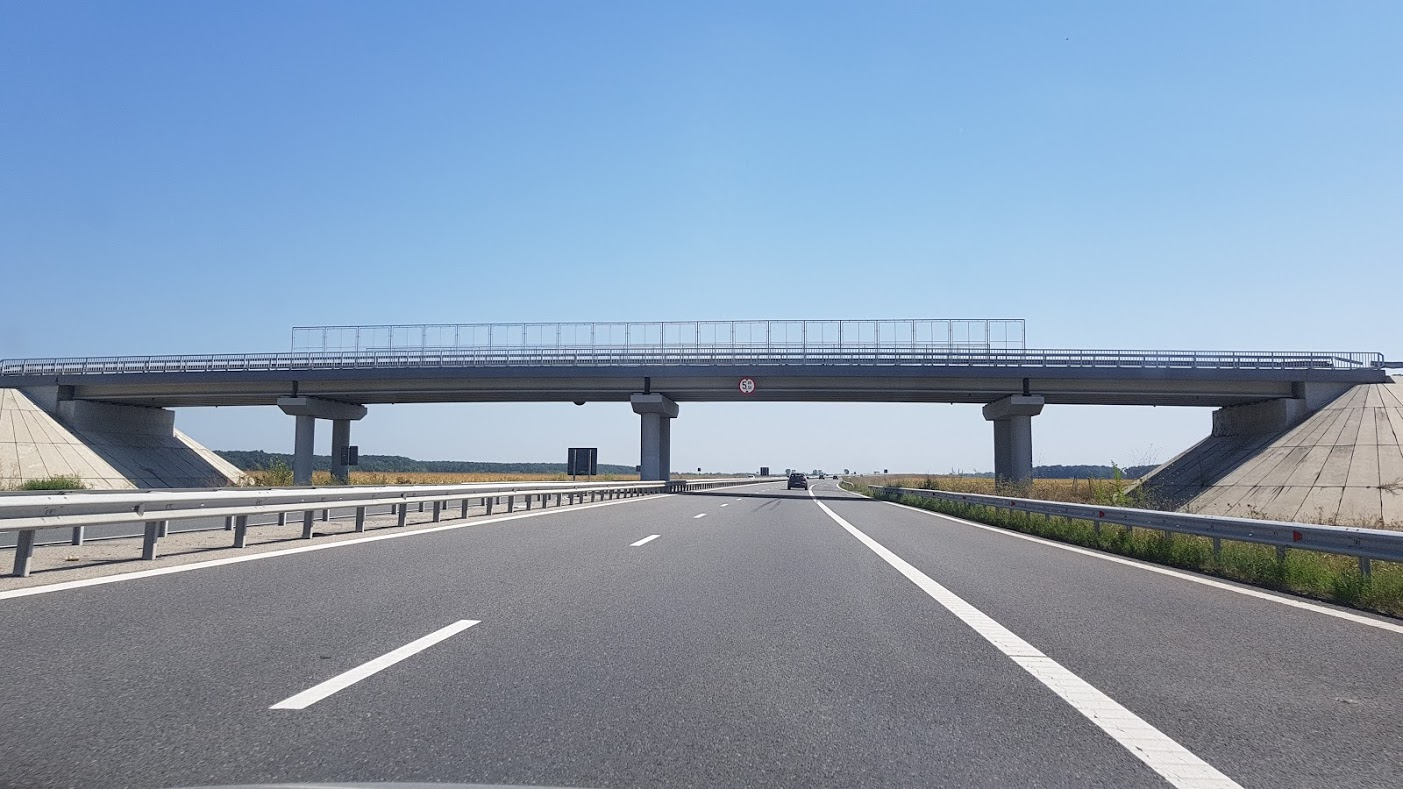

Route information
- Maintained by Compania Națională de Autostrăzi și Drumuri Naționale din România
- Length: 213.24 km (132.50 mi) 606.5 km (376.9 mi) planned 84.96 km (52.79 mi) under construction 41 km (25 mi) tendered
- Existed: 2009–present

Major junctions
- South end: Bucharest
- A 0 near Bucharest; A 7 near Ploiești; A 13 near Brașov (planned); A 13 near Făgăraș (planned); A 8 near Târgu Mureș (under construction); A 10 near Turda; DEx16 near Oradea
- North end: M4 at Borș (border with Hungary)

Location
- Country: Romania
- Counties: Ilfov, Prahova, Brașov, Sibiu, Mureș, Cluj, Sălaj, Bihor
- Major cities: Bucharest, Ploiești, Brașov, Făgăraș, Sighișoara, Târgu Mureș, Cluj-Napoca, Zalău, Oradea

Highway system
- Roads in Romania; Highways
← A 2	→ A 4

The A3 motorway (Romanian: Autostrada A3) is a partially built motorway in Romania, planned to connect Bucharest with the Transylvania region and the north-western part of the country. It will be 596 km long and will run along the route: Ploiești, Brașov, Făgăraș, Sighișoara, Târgu Mureș, Cluj-Napoca, Zalău and Oradea, connecting with Hungary's M4 motorway near Borș.

As of July 2025, there are roughly 204 km (127 mi) in service: the Bucharest – Ploiești motorway (62.5 km), the Râșnov – Cristian segment (6.3 km), the Târgu Mureș – Nădășelu segment (117 km) and the Biharia – Borș segment (5.4 km).

In January 2015, the motorway section between Târgu Mureș – Câmpia Turzii was awarded for construction. It was divided into two larger segments, with a total of five lots, which sum up 51.8 km. By December 2021, all segments have been opened to traffic, with the exception of Chețani − Câmpia Turzii (15.7 km), of which contract was terminated in March that year.

Additional works on the Nădășelu – Borș section (approx. 157 km, in total) were auctioned between 2018 and 2019, with contracts awarded for the Biharia − Borș segment (5.4 km, near the border with Hungary) in December 2018, the Chiribiș − Biharia segment (28.6 km) in June 2020, and the Zimbor – Poarta Sălajului segment (12.2 km) on the same month. Several other segments are still pending to be awarded.

Furthermore, on the Comarnic − Brașov section (58.0 km), the 5.2 km segment between Comarnic South – Comarnic North has been re-tendered in August 2020.

== Bucharest – Brașov section ==
Bucharest – Brașov section
Section	Length	Period of construction	Contractor	Total cost	Financier	Status
Bucharest – Moara Vlăsiei	19.5 km	May 2008 – August 2017	Impresa Pizzarotti and Tirrena Scavi	673.7 m lei	State budget	In service
Moara Vlăsiei – Ploiești	43.0 km	July 2007 – August 2012	Spedition UMB, Pa&Co Internațional, EuroConstruct Trading '98, Com-Axa	883.7 m lei	State budget	In service
Ploiești – Comarnic	48.6 km			379.4 m euro (est.)		Planned
Comarnic – Brașov	58 km				State budget	One segment in service, the rest - planned

This motorway section (also called the "Snow Motorway") will cross the Carpathian Mountains along the Prahova Valley (the Comarnic – Brașov segment is considered the most difficult section to be built). It will also provide access to the future Terminal 2 of the Henri Coandă Airport and to the future Bucharest – Chișinău motorway, via the Ploiești South-East (Dumbrava) interchange.

It was split into three larger sections: the Bucharest – Ploiești section (62 km), the Ploiești – Comarnic section (48.6 km) and the Comarnic – Brașov section (58 km).

=== Bucharest – Ploiești section ===
Work on the Bucharest – Ploiești section started on 15 March 2007 and was due to be completed by October 2012.

The first segment, between Bucharest – Moara Vlăsiei (19.5 km), was built as a six-lane set of carriageways to accommodate commuting and holiday surplus traffic. It was built by the Italian joint venture between Impresa Pizzarotti and Tirrena Scavi, while the second segment, between Moara Vlăsiei – Ploiești (43.0 km), was built by the Romanian companies Spedition UMB, Pa&Co Internațional and EuroConstruct Trading '98. Total construction cost of this section was estimated at 450 million euro.

The section between Bucharest Ring Road – Ploiești (55.5 km) was opened on 19 July 2012, while the rest of the section towards downtown Bucharest remained to be completed.

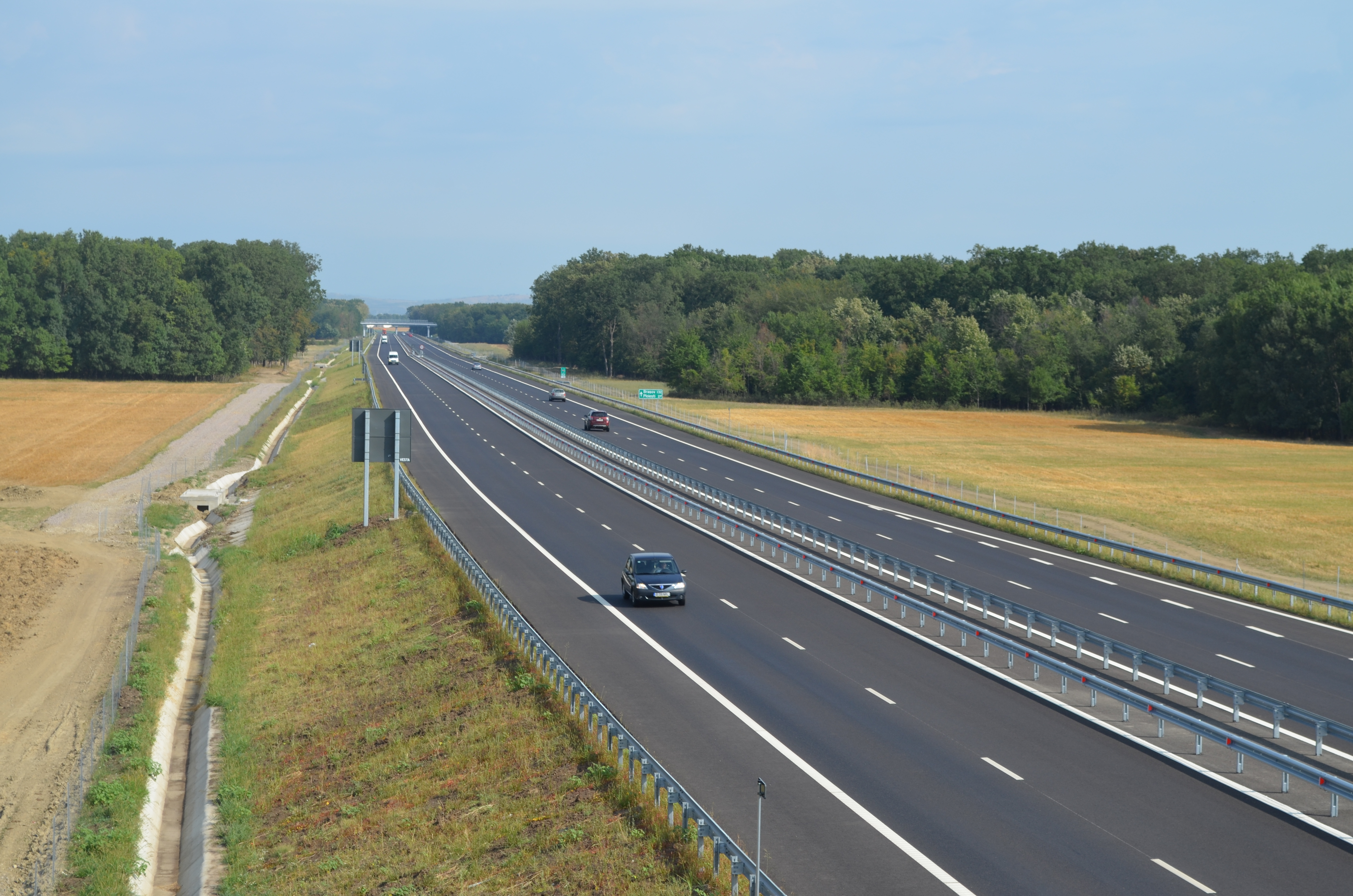
A3 motorway between Bucharest and Ploiești

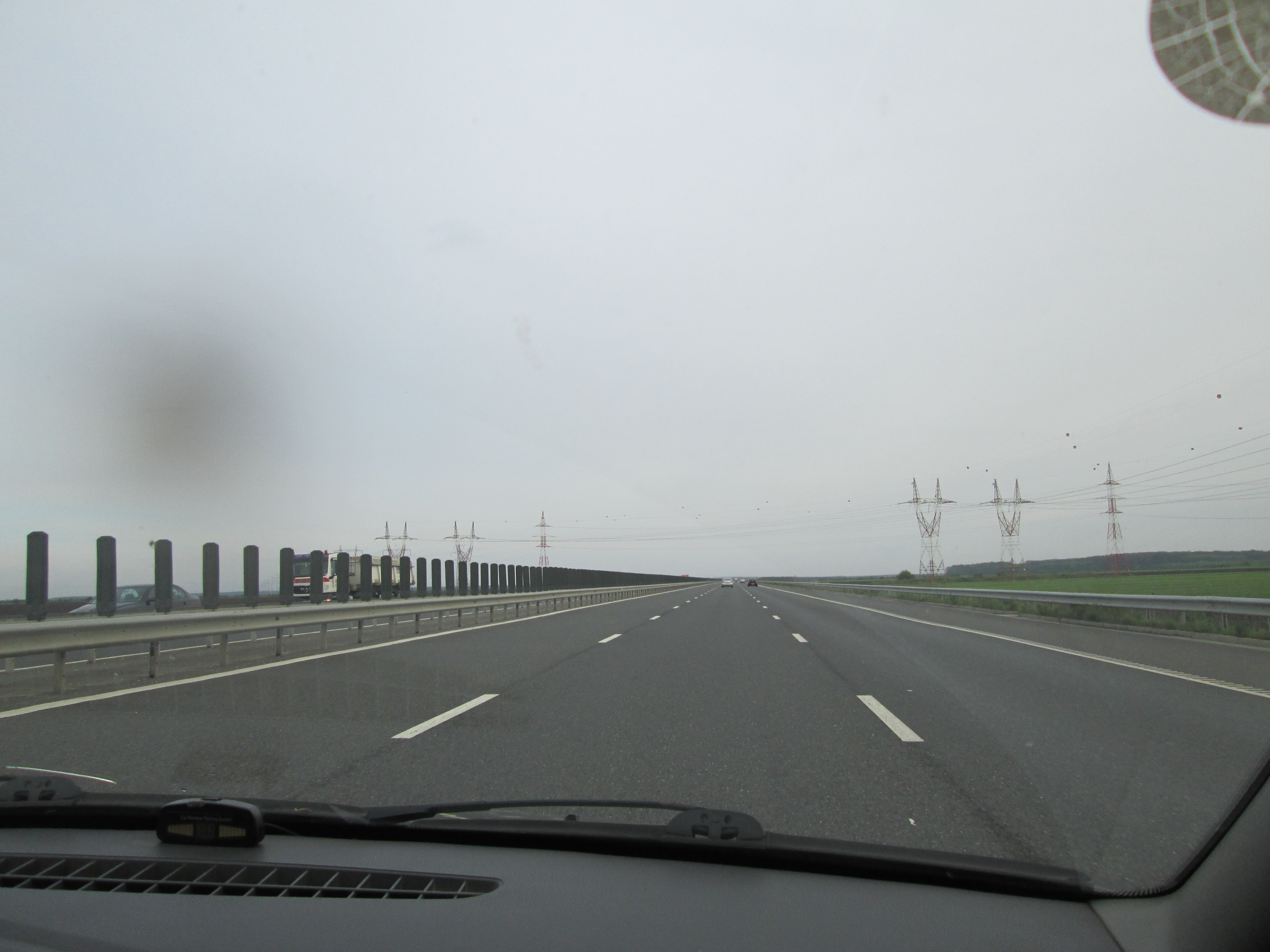
A3 motorway near Snagov. The subsection between Bucharest and Moara Vlăsiei is the only motorway in Romania that currently has three lanes in each direction.

The Bucharest – Bucharest Ring Road segment (6.5 km) is part of the Bucharest – Moara Vlăsiei subsection and was built under separately awarded contracts, as the one with Impresa Pizzarotti was terminated. It starts with a roundabout at the junction between the Fabrica de Glucoză and the Petricani Street (near 44°28′43″N 26°07′31″E), crosses over the Balta Saulei Lake, intersects the Gherghiței Street with a second roundabout (near 44°28′43″N 26°08′16″E), then continues northbound, crossing over the CFR Line 800, the Popasului Street (in Voluntari, where it has a diamond interchange near 44°29′33″N 26°08′57″E) and the Bucharest Ring Road, as well as the railroad again.

On the Popasului Street (Voluntari) – Bucharest Ring Road segment (4 km) work started in April 2012, whereas on the Petricani Street (Bucharest) – Popasului Street (Voluntari) segment (2.5 km) work was constantly delayed, partly because of remaining unfinished expropriations, until the contract was finally terminated in February 2015.

In December 2015, the construction work of the first 3.3 km of the motorway, the Bucharest Ring Road junction and the still under construction Moara Vlăsiei exit, was awarded to the joint-venture between Aktor and EuroConstruct Trading '98, for a cost of 129.2 million lei. They were planned to be completed by 2018, but the progress remained slow as of June that year. The entire segment from the Petricani Street to the Bucharest Ring Road was opened on 14 December 2018. The media has highlighted the facts that the motorway ends with a stoplight and it has a roundabout on its route, something unique in Romania, and widely regarded this segment as an "urban motorway".

=== Ploiești – Comarnic section ===
The Ploiești – Comarnic section has been in pre-feasibility phase and its profitability is being considered. It is complemented by a relatively settlement-free section of the parallel national road DN1.

=== Comarnic – Brașov section ===
Comarnic – Brașov section
Section	Length (Note: Lengths displayed had been modified and are no longer accurate.)	Period of construction	Contractor	Total cost	Financier	Status
Section 1: Comarnic Sud – Comarnic Nord	5.2 km			68.6 m euro		Re-tendered
Section 2: Comarnic Nord – Bușteni	16.3 km					Feasibility studies
Section 3: Bușteni – Predeal	12.8 km					Feasibility studies
Section 4: Predeal – Râșnov	15.2 km					Feasibility studies
Section 5: Râșnov – Cristian	6.3 km	October 2017 – December 2020	Alpenside	25.8 m euro	State budget	In service

Work on the Comarnic – Brașov section, the most difficult segment of the motorway, was due to begin in 2010 and take around four years to complete, but the French–Greek consortium Vinci–Aktor denounced the contract and construction was canceled. Total construction cost of this section was estimated at 1.2 billion euro.

The segment was re-tendered as a concession contract in February 2013. It has been awarded in December 2013 to the joint venture between Vinci, Strabag and Aktor, for a period of 29 years, with an estimated construction cost of 1.8 billion euro. This section of the motorway would have three twin tunnels, with a total length of 19.4 km, at Sinaia, Bușteni and Predeal, and four interchanges, at Comarnic, Bușteni, Predeal and Râșnov. The route would follow the river valley until Posada, where it would cross on the opposite side of the river and would run along the mountain range until Sinaia, from where it would then run nearly straight until Azuga, crossing through two twin tunnels that would bypass Sinaia and Bușteni, before crossing again to the eastern side of the river. According to media reports, work was expected to begin in April 2014, but was still pending, due to financial arrangements and the environmental certificate. According to the same reports, they had to be finalized in 2017.

As of June 2015, the concession had been canceled.

As of October 2015, section 1 (4.0 km) and section 5 (6.3 km, plus a connecting road) at the ends of the Comarnic – Brașov section were separately tendered. For section 1, a bid by Spedition UMB and Tehnostrade remained the only one, while the other tender was leaning towards a consortium led by the Spanish construction company Copisa. However, as of October 2017, after the termination of challenge procedures, only the Râșnov – Cristian segment was awarded for construction, to the Cypriot company Alpenside. The contract, which includes a 3.7 km connecting road, is worth 25.8 million euro and should take 6 months for planning and 18 months for execution. The bid for the Comarnic Sud – Comarnic Nord section had been canceled by February 2017, as the only bid was not in accordance with the terms.

In October 2018, the motorway Ploiești – Comarnic – Brașov (around 100 km) was once again tendered, as a public–private partnership, that would take 24 years and have an estimated cost of 1.36 billion euro. The Romanian state would contribute with 25%, while the private partner would contribute with 75%. As of December 2018, the tender's deadline, there were five companies or joint-venture interested. The project received criticism from the NGO called Asociația Pro Infrastructură for lacking details of major importance. In October 2019, it was announced that the joint venture selected for the construction work was China Communications Construction Company (China) – Makyol Insaat Sanayi Turizm (Turkey). The project was, once more, cancelled in the first quarter of 2020, by the newly elected government, in favor of a new future tender, based on European funds.

In August 2020, the segment between Comarnic South and Comarnic North (5.2 km, according to the project) was tendered again, for 68.6 million euro, with a contract length of 36 months, of which 12 months for the project and 24 months for the construction.

In December 2020, the Râșnov - Cristian segment was opened.

== Brașov – Oradea section ==
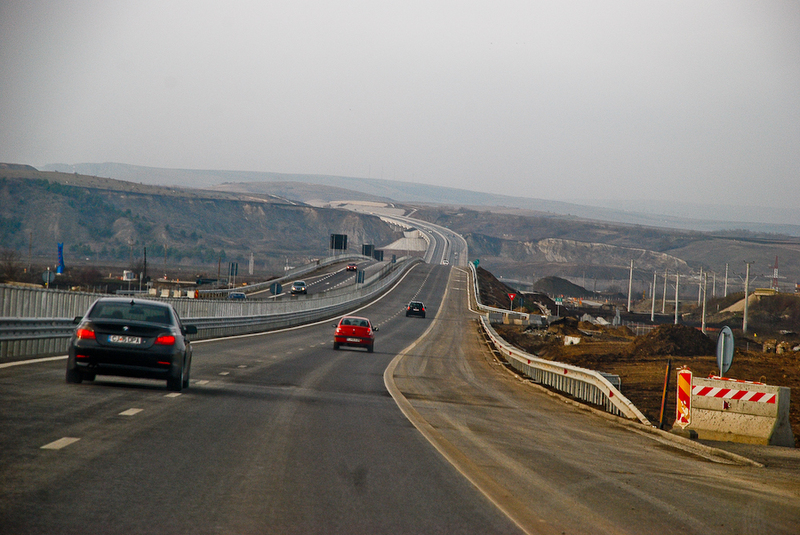
A3 motorway between Cluj-Napoca West (Gilău) and Turda

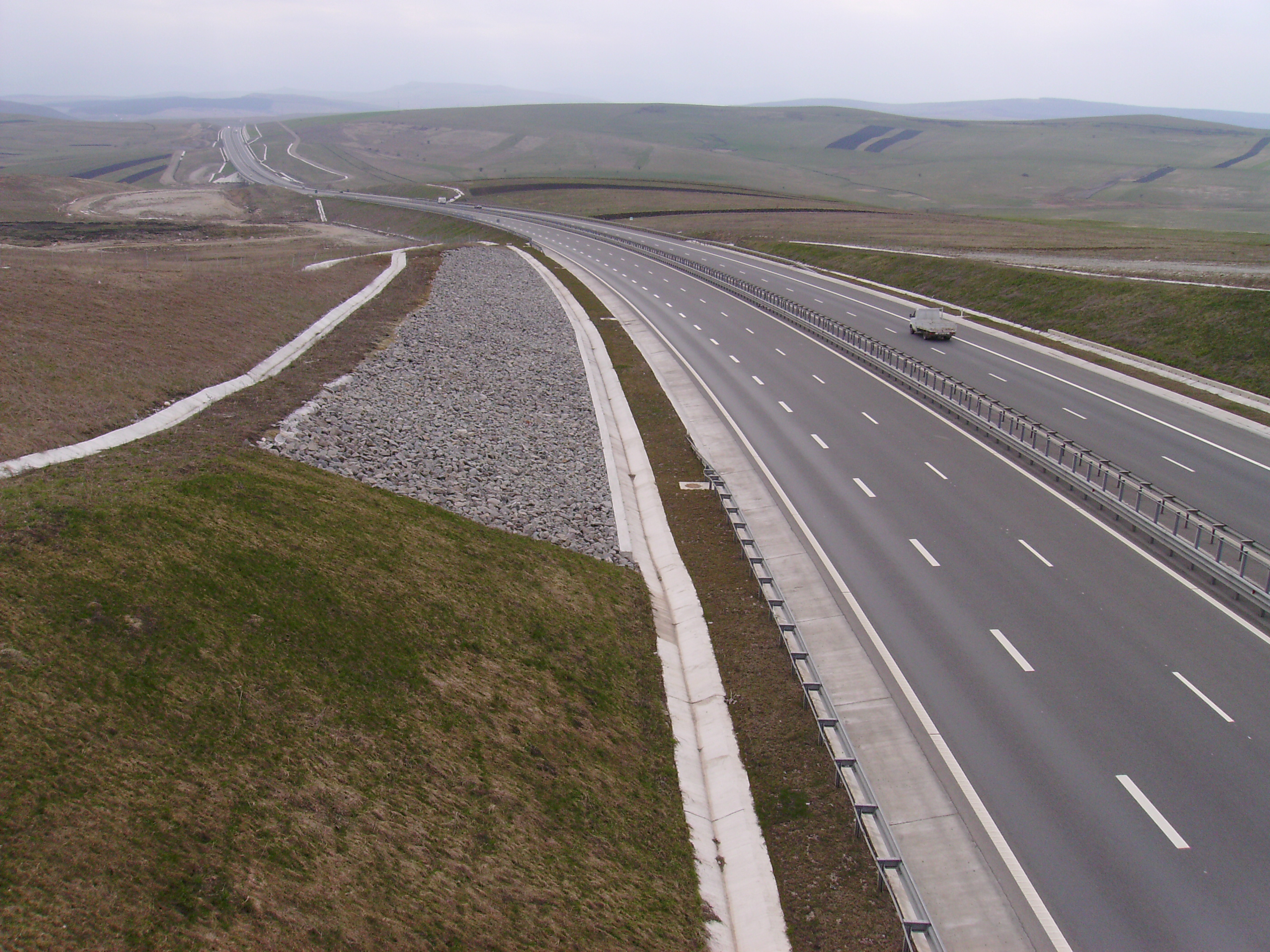
A3 motorway near Cheile Turului

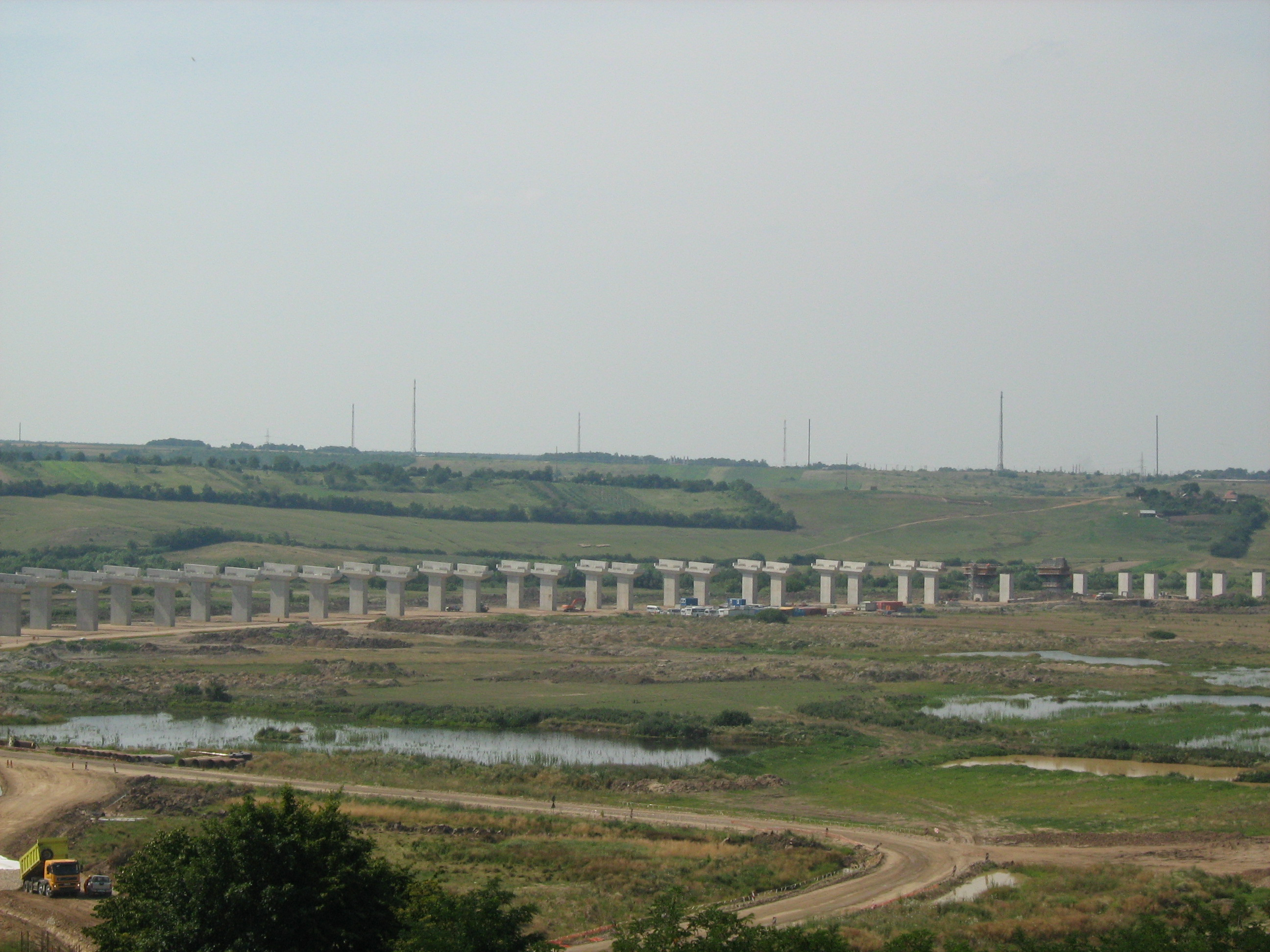
Suplacu de Barcău Viaduct under construction

This motorway segment, known as the Transylvania Motorway (Romanian: Autostrada Transilvania), was split into three parts, with several subsections: the Brașov (Cristian) – Târgu Mureș (Ogra) segment (160.1 km), the Târgu Mureș (Ogra) – Cluj-Napoca West (Gilău) segment (89.7 km) and the Cluj-Napoca West (Gilău) – Oradea West (Borș) segment (165.5 km).

The segments in service of this section of the motorway are the Câmpia Turzii – Nădăşelu segment (61.2 km), under several openings between December 2009 and September 2018, the Ungheni – Chețani segment (31.6 km), under several openings between December 2018 and September 2020, and the Biharia − Borș segment (5.4 km). The Suplacu de Barcău – Borș segment (64.5 km) has been under construction since 2004, but the contract was terminated in May 2013, with the construction progress around 50%. Additional work is being performed on the Chețani – Câmpia Turzii segment (15.7 km).

=== Bechtel controversy ===
The entire section was originally scheduled to be built by the American company Bechtel Corporation together with its regional partner Enka of Turkey. The contract was awarded in 2004 to the Bechtel Corporation by the Social Democrat Prime-Minister Adrian Năstase without an open bidding process, invoking "national security" as an excuse. The estimated construction cost was 2.8 billion € in 2003 and it rose to 4.7 billion € in a 2007 estimate. Although officially the deadline was set for 2013, the final cost and finalization date remained unknown.

As per the Romanian ministry of transportation, Anca Boagiu, the original contract was highly disadvantageous to the Romanian side. Following the contract renegotiation that occurred in June–July 2011, Bechtel agreed to lower the building cost per kilometer by 50% down to 6.9 million euro. Also it was decided that the American company will build only two segments (Suplacu de Barcău – Borș and Câmpia Turzii – Cluj-Napoca West/Gilău), leaving all the other segments of the motorway open for tendering.

=== Construction progress ===
==== Câmpia Turzii – Cluj-Napoca West – Nădășelu section ====
The official groundbreaking ceremony for the Transylvania Motorway was held near the village of Vălișoara on 16 June 2004. On 1 December 2009, the Turda – Cluj-Napoca West (Gilău) segment (42 km) was opened for traffic, followed on 13 November 2010, by the Câmpia Turzii – Turda segment (10 km). As of January 2012, work was being performed only on the Suplacu de Barcău – Oradea West (Borș) segment, with 17 km planned to be opened on 15 November 2012 and other 18 km on 30 August 2013. However, not much progress was visible on this segment by August 2012, and the bridge across the Someșul Mic river, part of the Câmpia Turzii – Cluj-Napoca West (Gilău) segment, was also yet to be built. In May 2013, the contract with the Bechtel Corporation was terminated through mutual agreement. The construction status of the Suplacu de Barcău – Borș segment is reportedly at 50%.

An additional 8.7 km segment, between Cluj-Napoca West (Gilău) and Nădășelu, was tendered in August 2012, and awarded to the joint venture between Spedition UMB and Tehnostrade in April 2013. Work on this segment was scheduled to begin as late as six months after signing the contract and take one year and a half to complete. The segment would act as a bypass for Cluj-Napoca, the second most populous city in the country, on the route towards Zalău and Baia Mare. The contract was reportedly terminated in June 2013, before any construction work started, but work began in the summer of 2014, with an expected opening date in April 2016. As of April 2017, the segment was largely completed, but unusable due to the fact that the bridge across the Someșul Mic river connecting with the Câmpia Turzii – Cluj-Napoca West (Gilău) segment was not completed. A contract for the remaining work to this bridge was signed in September 2017, and was expected to be completed by August 2018. The work was finally completed in September 2018. The contractor was the Italian company Tirrena Scavi.

==== Târgu Mureș – Câmpia Turzii section ====
The section from Târgu Mureș, via Ogra, to Câmpia Turzii, with a length of 51.8 km, was tendered in 2014, and for four out of five lots, contracts have been signed at the end of February and early March 2015. Construction was set to take between 12 and 16 months, depending on the lot.

The Târgu Mureș – Ogra lot 1 (between Târgu Mureș – Ungheni, 4.5 km of motorway and 4.7 km of connecting road) was awarded to the joint-venture Lemacons - Vega 93 - Arcada Company, for a cost of 179.8 million lei (excluding VAT). The Târgu Mureș – Ogra lot 2 (between Ungheni – Ogra, 10.1 km) was awarded to the joint-venture between Strabag and Straco Grup, for a cost of 251.3 million lei (excluding VAT). The Ogra – Câmpia Turzii lot 1 (between Ogra – Iernut, 3.6 km) was awarded to the joint-venture Geiger Transilvania - Wilhelm Geiger GmbH & Co. KG, for a cost of 55.8 million lei (excluding VAT). The Ogra – Câmpia Turzii lot 2 (between Iernut – Chețani, 17.9 km) was awarded to the joint-venture between Astaldi and Max Bögl, for a cost of 379.7 million lei (excluding VAT). The Ogra – Câmpia Turzii lot 3 (between Chețani – Câmpia Turzii, 15.7 km) was awarded to the joint venture Straco Grup - Specialist Consulting - Total Road, for a cost of 279.7 million lei (excluding VAT).

The contract for the Târgu Mureș – Ungheni segment (lot 1) was terminated in April 2016, due to delays in pre-construction arrangements by the CNADNR, and was awarded again in November 2017, to the Austrian company Strabag. However, the bid was challenged in court and it was not signed (with the Austrian contractor) until the end of May 2020. The contract is worth 39 million euro (not including VAT) and is supposed to take 18 months to complete. This segment finally opened on 6 December 2021.

On December 12, 2018, the Târgu Mureș – Ogra lot 2 and the Ogra – Câmpia Turzii lot 1 opened to traffic for a continuous motorway segment of 13.7 km between Ungheni and Iernut, while the Ogra – Câmpia Turzii lot 2 (17.9 km, between Iernut – Chețani) opened on 18 September 2020. On the other hand, the contract for the Ogra – Câmpia Turzii lot 3 was terminated in March 2021, due to the slow construction progress and insolvent status of the constructor.

The whole section was finished on December 15, 2023, when the final lot between Chețani and Câmpia Turzii was finished. Traffic was opened the following week, on December 21, and because of this, residents of the Mureș county can now travel from Târgu Mureș by changing to the A10 motorway in Turda and then the A1 motorway in Sebeș (with a small gap between Holdea and Margina) all the way to the Hungarian border in Nădlac, and from there towards most of Europe only on highway, being a huge achievement for the people in the region.

==== Cluj-Napoca West – Nădăşelu – Borș section ====
The section is divided into three subsections: Cluj-Napoca West (Gilău) – Mihăiești, Mihăiești – Suplacu de Barcău and Suplacu de Barcău – Borș.

The remaining work on the Suplacu de Barcău – Borș subsection (64.5 km) was awarded for construction in April 2015 (to the joint-venture of Corsán and Corviam Construcción), but no progress had been recorded as of January 2016. In November 2016, the contract was reportedly close to being terminated.

In August 2018, the same subsection were auctioned for the third time, with some of the winners of the bids still pending to be awarded. The subsection is divided into three lots: lot 1, Suplacu de Barcău – Chiribiș (26.3 km); lot 2, Chiribiș − Biharia (28.6 km), and lot 3, Biharia − Borș (5.4 km). In October 2018, the lot 2 was awarded to the Romanian company Trameco, part of the Selina Group, but this was challenged and only as of June 2020, the contract has been signed with that specific company. It should take 6 months for projection and 18 months for construction, being valued at 67.5 million euro. In December 2018, it was announced that the contract for the lot 3 was signed with a joint-venture led by the same company, Trameco. It is worth 28.5 million euro and has the deadline in 19 months. The same month, the lot 1 was awarded to the same company, but the bid was challenged and the result was still expected.

In March 2019, additional segments were tendered: Nădășelu – Mihăiești – Zimbor (30.1 km), Zimbor – Poarta Sălajului (12.2 km) and Nușfalău – Suplacu de Barcău (13.6 km).

In June 2019, two more contracts were awarded: Suplacu de Barcău – Chiribiș (26.35 km) and Chiribiș – Biharia (28.55 km). However, the tender for the Suplacu de Barcău – Chiribiș segment, awarded to the Constructii – Hidroelektra Mehanizacija joint venture, was canceled in October 2019, after the Croatian partner filed for insolvency, whereas the one for the Chiribiş – Biharia segment has been contested again and was still under trial procedures until June 2020, when it was signed with a joint-venture led by Trameco. The value of the contract 67.5 million euro, with 6 months allowed for the projection and 18 months for the construction.

In June 2020, the contract for the Zimbor – Poarta Sălajului segment (12.2 km) was signed with the Romanian company Spedition UMB, for about 140 million euro and a term of 12 months for projection and 24 months for construction. In September 2020, this was followed by the signing of the contract for the Nușfalău – Suplacu de Barcău segment (13.6 km) with the Turkish company Nurol (costing 384 million lei (excluding VAT), with a term of 6 months for projection and another 18 for construction), later being followed by the signing of the contract for the Nădășelu – Mihăiești – Zimbor segment (30.1 km) with a joint-venture led by Spedition UMB. The value of this contract is 1.4 billion lei (excluding VAT), having the same terms for projection & construction as that of the Zimbor – Poarta Sălajului segment.

By the end of 2020, the last remaining segments of this section have been tendered: Poarta Sălajului − Zalău − Nușfalău (41 km) and Suplacu de Barcău − Chiribiș (26.35 km).

In January 2021, construction began on the Nădăşelu - Mihăieşti segment and the Chiribiş - Biharia section. The contract for the Chiribiş-Biharia section was canceled due was terminated in May 2022 because the construction slow progress and problems with claims.

On 19 February 2021, the submission of applications for the award procedure of Poarta Sălajului − Zalău − Nușfalău section took place, 12 companies applied, from which CNAIR will only choose 6 for the actual tender

== Openings timeline ==
- Turda – Cluj-Napoca West (Gilău) segment (42 km) opened for traffic on 1 December 2009 and it currently serves as a motorway bypass for the city of Cluj-Napoca.
- Câmpia Turzii – Turda segment (10 km) opened on 13 November 2010 and it currently serves as a motorway bypass for both these cities.
- Bucharest Ring Road – Ploiești segment (55 km) opened on 19 July 2012.
- Cluj-Napoca West (Gilău) – Nădășelu segment (9.5 km, including the Someșul Mic viaduct) opened on 28 September 2018.
- Ungheni – Iernut segment (13.7 km) opened on 12 December 2018.
- Bucharest (Petricani Street) – Bucharest Ring Road segment (6.5 km) opened on 14 December 2018.
- Biharia − Borș segment (5.4 km) and border control facility opened on September 4, 2020.
- Iernut − Chețani segment (17.9 km) opened on 18 September 2020.
- Râșnov − Cristian segment (6.3 km) opened on 17 December 2020.
- Târgu Mureș − Ungheni segment (4.5 km) opened on 6 December 2021.
- Nuşfalău – Suplacu de Barcău (13.5 km) opened on 21 September 2023.
- Cheţani – Câmpia Turzii (15.7 km) opened on 21 December 2023.
- Zimbor - Poarta Sălajului (12.24 km) opened on 11 August 2026

=== Construction progress ===
As of July 2020, the following progress was recorded:

The following segments also have contracts signed and are in early design and construction states:

- Nădăşelu - Zimbor, due March 2027

== Exit list ==
County	Location	km	mi	Destinations	Notes
City of Bucharest		6	3.7	Gherghiței Street, Bucharest	Southern terminus. Opened December 2018
Ilfov	Voluntari	9	5.6	Popasului Street, Voluntari	Opened December 2018
Ilfov	Ștefăneștii de Jos	13	8.1	DNCB – Bucharest	Opened July 2012
Ilfov	Ștefăneștii de Jos	16	9.9	Short-term parking	
Ilfov	Ștefăneștii de Jos	22	14	A 0 – Bucharest	Opened 2023
Ilfov	Moara Vlăsiei	23	14	Short-term parking, north-bound only	
Ilfov	Moara Vlăsiei	25	16	DJ101 – Moara Vlăsiei, Balotești	Opened 2018
Ilfov	Moara Vlăsiei	26	16	Short-term parking, south-bound only	
Ilfov	Snagov	30	19	DC184 – Snagov	Opened July 2012
Ilfov	Gruiu	34	21	Short-term parking	
Ilfov	Gruiu	38	24	Bridge over Ialomița river	
Prahova	Gherghița	41	25	Short-term parking	
Prahova	Gherghița	43	27	DJ100B – Gherghița	Opened November 2015
Prahova	Drăgănești	47	29	Bridge over Prahova river	
Prahova	Dumbrava, Prahova	49	30	Short-term parking	
Prahova	Dumbrava, Prahova	53	33	A 7 – Ploiești East, Buzău	Opened December 2024
Prahova	Râfov	56	35	Short-term parking	
Prahova	Bărcănești	63	39	Short-term parking	
Prahova	Bărcănești	68	42	DN1 – Ploiești South	Opened July 2012
Missing connection north towards Râșnov
Brașov	Râșnov	0	0.0	DN73 – Râșnov, Bran	Opened December 2020
Brașov	Râșnov	6	3.7	DN73G / DJ112B – Brașov South, Cristian	Opened December 2020
Missing connection north-west towards Târgu Mureș
Mureș	Gheorghe Doja	0	0.0	DN15J – Târgu Mureș West	Opened December 2021
Mureș	Ungheni	2	1.2	DJ151D – Acățari	westbound entrance, eastbound exit
Mureș	Ungheni	4	2.5	DN15 – Ungheni, Târgu Mureș International Airport	Opened December 2018
Mureș	Sânpaul	7	4.3	Short-term parking	
Mureș	Iernut	18	11	DN14A – Iernut, Târnăveni	Opened December 2018
Mureș	Bogata	31	19	Bridge over Mureș river	
Mureș	Luduș	32	20	Short-term parking	
Mureș	Luduș	34	21	Bridge over Mureș river	
Mureș	Chețani	36	22	DN15 – Chețani, Luduș	Opened September 2020
Cluj	Câmpia Turzii	0	0.0	DN15 – Câmpia Turzii	Opened November 2010
Cluj	Mihai Viteazu	9	5.6	A 10 – Alba Iulia, Sebeș	Opened July 2018
Cluj	Mihai Viteazu	9	5.6	DN1 – Turda, Aiud	Opened December 2009
Cluj	Mihai Viteazu	10	6.2	Short-term parking	
Cluj	Mihai Viteazu	12	7.5	U-turn exit	Northbound only
Cluj	Mihai Viteazu	12	7.5	Bridge over Arieș river	
Cluj	Petreștii de Jos	21	13	DEx4 – Tureni, Cluj-Napoca South	Opened July 2025
Cluj	Săvădisla	44	27	U-turn exit	Southbound only
Cluj	Florești	46	29	Short-term parking	
Cluj	Gilău	51	32	DN1 – Cluj-Napoca West, Gilău	Opened December 2009
Cluj	Gilău	52	32	Bridge over Someșul Mic river	
Cluj	Gârbău	61	38	DN1F – Cluj-Napoca North, Nădășelu	Opened September 2018
Missing connection north-west towards Zimbor
Sălaj	Zimbor	0	0.0	DN1G – Zimbor, Huedin	Opened August 2026
Sălaj	Românași	12	7.5	DN1F – Poarta Sălajului	Opened August 2026
Missing connection west towards Nușfalău
Sălaj	Nușfalău	0	0.0	DN1H – Nușfalău, Huedin	Opened September 2023
Sălaj	Nușfalău	2	1.2	Short-term parking	
Sălaj	Ip	3	1.9	U-turn exit	Westbound only
Sălaj	Suplacu de Barcău	13	8.1	DN19B – Suplacu de Barcău	Opened September 2023
Missing connection west towards Biharia
Bihor	Biharia	0	0.0	DN19 – Oradea North, Biharia	Opened September 2020
Bihor	Biharia	2	1.2	DEx16 – Oradea West, Arad	Opened March 2024
Bihor	Biharia	4	2.5	Short-term parking	
Bihor	Biharia	5	3.1	M4 – Debrecen	Opened September 2020
1.000 mi = 1.609 km; 1.000 km = 0.621 mi: Unopened

== See also ==
- Roads in Romania
- Meseș Tunnel
- Suplacu de Barcău Viaduct
- Transport in Romania
