= Suceava–Oar Motorway =

Planned motorway in Romania

A14 motorway

Route information
- Maintained by Compania Națională de Autostrăzi și Drumuri Naționale din România
- Length: 0 km (0 mi; 0 ft) 335 km (208 mi) (planned length)

Major junctions
- From: A 7 near Suceava
- To: M49 at Oar (border with Hungary)

Location
- Country: Romania

Highway system
- Roads in Romania; Highways
← A 13	→ A 0

The Suceava–Oar Motorway (Romanian: Autostrada Suceava–Oar), also known as the North Motorway (Romanian: Autostrada Nordului), labelled A14, is a proposed motorway in the northern part of Romania that upon completion will link Southern Bukovina to Maramureș and further to the Central and Western Europe countries. It will begin in Suceava (at the junction with the A7 motorway) and pass through Vatra Dornei, Bistrița, Dej, Baia Mare and Satu Mare, connecting with Hungary's under construction M49 expressway near Oar. It will be 335 km long.

As of 2021, the segment between Satu Mare and Oar (14 km) is in the project phase.

== See also ==
- Roads in Romania
- Transport in Romania
