= Cornu de Sus =

Cornu de Sus may refer to several villages in Romania:

- Cornu de Sus, a village in Cornu, Prahova
- Cornu de Sus, a village in Dumbrava, Prahova
