= A7 motorway (Romania) =

Highway replacer of the E85 traffic

A7 motorway

- Overview of the A7 motorway as of August 2026

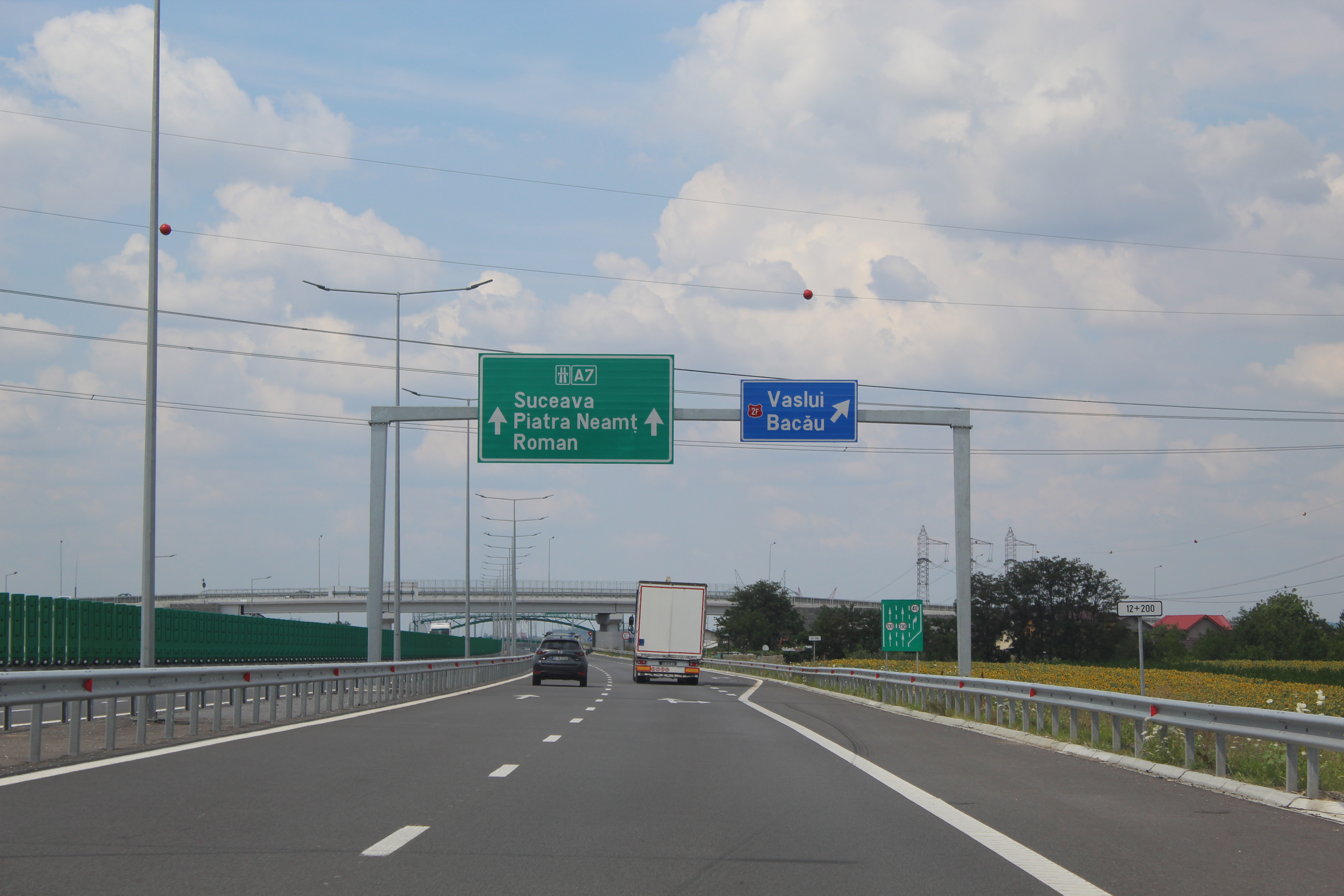
- Interchange with the DN2F at Holt, east of Bacău

Route information
- Maintained by Compania Națională de Administrare a Infrastructurii Rutiere
- Length: 241.62 km (150.14 mi) 453.3 km (281.7 mi) planned 185.3 km (115.1 mi) under construction 56.1 km (34.9 mi) tendered
- Existed: 2020–present

Major junctions
- South end: A 3 near Ploiești
- A 13 near Răcăciuni; A 8 near Pașcani; A 14 near Suceava
- North end: M 19 at Siret (border with Ukraine)

Location
- Country: Romania
- Counties: Prahova, Buzău, Vrancea, Bacău, Neamț, Iași, Suceava
- Major cities: Ploiești, Buzău, Focșani, Bacău, Roman, Pașcani, Suceava

Highway system
- Roads in Romania; Highways
← A 6	→ A 8

The A7 motorway (Romanian: Autostrada A7), also known as the Ploiești–Siret Motorway (Romanian: Autostrada Ploiești–Siret) or the Moldavia Motorway (Romanian: Autostrada Moldovei), is a partially built motorway in Romania, that upon completion will link Ploiești to the north-eastern part of the country, partly along the Pan-European Corridor IX. It will run along the route: Buzău, Focșani, Bacău, Roman, Pașcani, and Suceava, connecting to Ukraine's M19 highway near Siret.

As of September 2026, several segments of the motorway are done, totaling to 241.61 km of opened motorway. All other sections of the motorway are in various stages of tendering and construction.

The Pașcani – Siret section will be co-financed through EU funds, while the government wants the Ploiești – Pașcani section (excluding the Bacău bypass) to be financed through the Romanian PNRR (short for Planul Național de Redresare și Reziliență, part of the Next Generation EU package).

== History ==
Initially it was designed as a 314 km (195 mi) long motorway branching off the A3 motorway and passing through Buzău, Focșani, and Albița, to the border with the Republic of Moldova. However, since 2014 plans in favor of a motorway past Focșani were scrapped in favor of a motorway towards Bacău, Suceava, and Siret termed A7. The motorway from Focșani to Albița (155 km) will have a different route number assigned and, as of April 2014, it was no longer a priority in the master plan for the national motorway network.

In November 2024, Mykola Kutsak, the head of the Chernivtsi Oblast Council, stated that, in the future, the highway might expand to Chernivtsi and that it will have a strong positive impact on the region.

== Sections ==
Map of the Bacău bypass

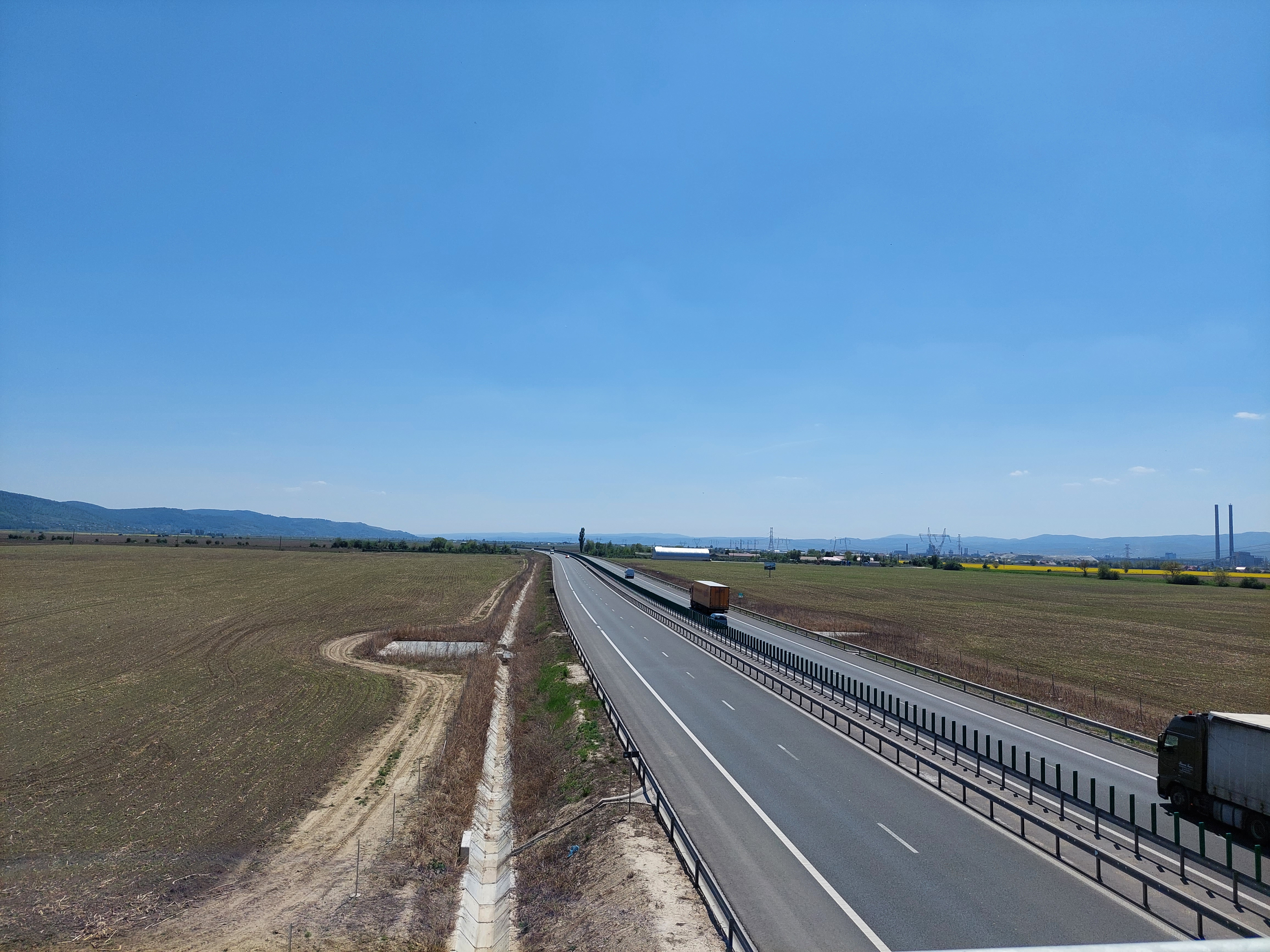
The Bacău bypass

The first section, from Ploiești to Focșani (133 km), was proposed for a concession contract for tendering first half of 2013. No contract was signed, and the only section that has been tendered was the Bacău bypass (30.6 km, of which 16.2 km of motorway) in August 2013, but built at only half profile. It was awarded for construction in November 2013, but the results of the tender were contested by some of the participants. Later in 2014, the whole motorway was redesigned as an expressway that would later be expanded to full motorway specifications.

On 30 May 2016, the construction works at Bacău bypass started, and they were expected to be finished by 2022, but the contract with the Turkish company Eko İnşaat ve Ticaret was terminated in April 2017, due to financial difficulties of the constructor.

In December 2017, the Bacău bypass was reauctioned, this time as a full motorway section, and was awarded in December 2018, to the local based Spedition UMB – Tehnostrade joint venture, with the deadline in three years.

The Bacău bypass opened on 2 December 2020, with minor works, mainly to the protective elements and to one exit, remaining yet to be completed. All remaining works on the bypass and its branches were completed by August 2021. All other sections are in the feasibility study and technical project phase, with the exception of the motorway segments between Ploiești and Focșani via Buzău. The Ploiești - Buzău section (62 km) was auctioned for construction on 1 June 2021. On 1 February 2022, the Buzău bypass (4.6 km) and the Focșani bypass (10.9 km) were auctioned for construction, followed by the segments Buzău - Râmnicu Sărat (30.8 km) and Râmnicu Sărat - Focșani (36.1 km) on 8 February, same year, both on the Buzău - Focșani section (82.4 km).

On 7 June 2022, the segment between Mizil and Pietroasele (Ploiești - Buzău lot 2, 28.3 km) was awarded to the joint-venture Coni-Trace. 9 days later, on 16 June 2022, the segment between Ploiești and Mizil (Ploiești - Buzău lot 1, 21.0 km) was awarded to the joint-venture Impresa Pizzarotti-Retter. On 25 July 2022, the tender for the Bacău - Pașcani section (77.3 km) was launched, being divided into three lots: Bacău - Roman (lot 1, 30.3 km), Roman - Săbăoani (lot 2, 18.9 km), and Săbăoani - Pașcani (lot 3, 28.09 km). In August 2022, the tender for Focșani - Bacău launched as well, also divided into three lots: Focșani - Domnești-Târg (lot 1, 35.6 km), Domnești-Târg - Răcăciuni (lot 2, 38.78 km), and Răcăciuni - Bacău (lot 3, 21.52 km). On 6 September 2022, the Buzău bypass and the Focșani bypass were awarded to the joint-venture SA&PE-Spedition UMB-Tehnostrade.

The route of the Focșani bypass, which opened on 7 November 2024, is notorious for its so-called "hump", backed by the local authorities of the city of Focșani on the grounds of an unapproved "general urban plan". The CNAIR tried unsuccessfully to convince the local authorities to support the variant of a straight route. Plans call that at Rădăuți (Milișăuți) the road towards Siret becomes an expressway, however this section is yet to have a route number assigned.

As of August 2022, lots 1 and 2 of the Ploiești - Buzău section are undergoing construction.

In the early hours of 21 September 2023, a gas explosion occurred near Călimănești in the Vrancea county, killing 4 and injuring 5 more. The explosion was caused where the motorway's construction site crossed a gas pipeline, which was initially believed to be at a depth of 1,8 meters, but had turned out to be much more shallow. Transgaz, the national gas distribution provider, blamed the construction company for performing unauthorized work in the area.

== Openings timeline ==
- 2 December 2020: the Bacău bypass (16.269 km).
- 7 November 2024: Mândrești–Munteni – Focșani (Buzău-Focșani lot 4; 10.94 km).
- 21 November 2024: Buzău–Râmnicu Sărat (30.8 km).
- 20 December 2024: Mândrești–Munteni – Râmnicu Sărat (36.1 km).
- 23 December 2024: Dumbrava–Mizil (21 km).
- 31 August 2026: Adjud–Bacău (47 km).

== Exit list ==
County	Location	km	mi	Exit	Destinations	Notes
Prahova	Dumbrava	0	0.0	—	A 3 – Bucharest, Ploiești	Southern terminus. Opened December 2024.
Prahova	Albești-Paleologu	9	5.6	1	DN1D	Opened April 2025.
Prahova	Mizil	21	13	2		Opened December 2024.
Buzău	Pietroasele	39	24	3		Opened October 2025.
Buzău	Buzău	53	33	4	DN2 – Buzău West	Opened November 2025.
Buzău	Buzău	62	39	5	DN2B – Buzău East	Opened July 2025.
Buzău	Vadu Pașii	67	42	6		Opened November 2024.
Buzău	Valea Râmnicului	91	57	Rest area: MOL		
Buzău	Râmnicu Sărat	98	61	7	DN22	Opened November 2024.
Vrancea	Bogza	117	73	8	DN2N	Opened December 2024.
Vrancea	Slobozia Ciorăști	126	78	9		Opened December 2024.
Vrancea	Focșani	136	85	10	DN23 – Focșani Sud	Opened November 2024.
Vrancea	Focșani	145	90	11	DN2 – Focșani Nord	Opened November 2024.
Vrancea	Tișița	161	100	12	DN2L / DN24	Opened December 2025.
Vrancea	Domnești-Târg	180	110	13	DN2	Opened December 2025.
Vrancea	Adjud	195	121	14	DN11	Opened December 2025.
Bacău	Sascut	205	127	Short-term parking		
Bacău	Răcăciuni	219	136	15	DJ252E – Răcăciuni	Opened August 2026
Bacău	Faraoani	236	147	Short-term parking		
Bacău	Bacău	242	150	16	DN2 – Bacău Sud	Opened December 2020.
Bacău	Bacău	252	157	17	DN2F – Bacău Est	Opened December 2020.
Bacău	Bacău	258	160	18	DN2 – Bacău Nord	Temporary Northern terminus. Opened December 2020.
Temporary missing connection north towards Pașcani
1.000 mi = 1.609 km; 1.000 km = 0.621 mi: Unopened

== See also ==
- Roads in Romania
- Transport in Romania
