= DN2 =

Road in Romania

National Road 2
- Drumul Național 2

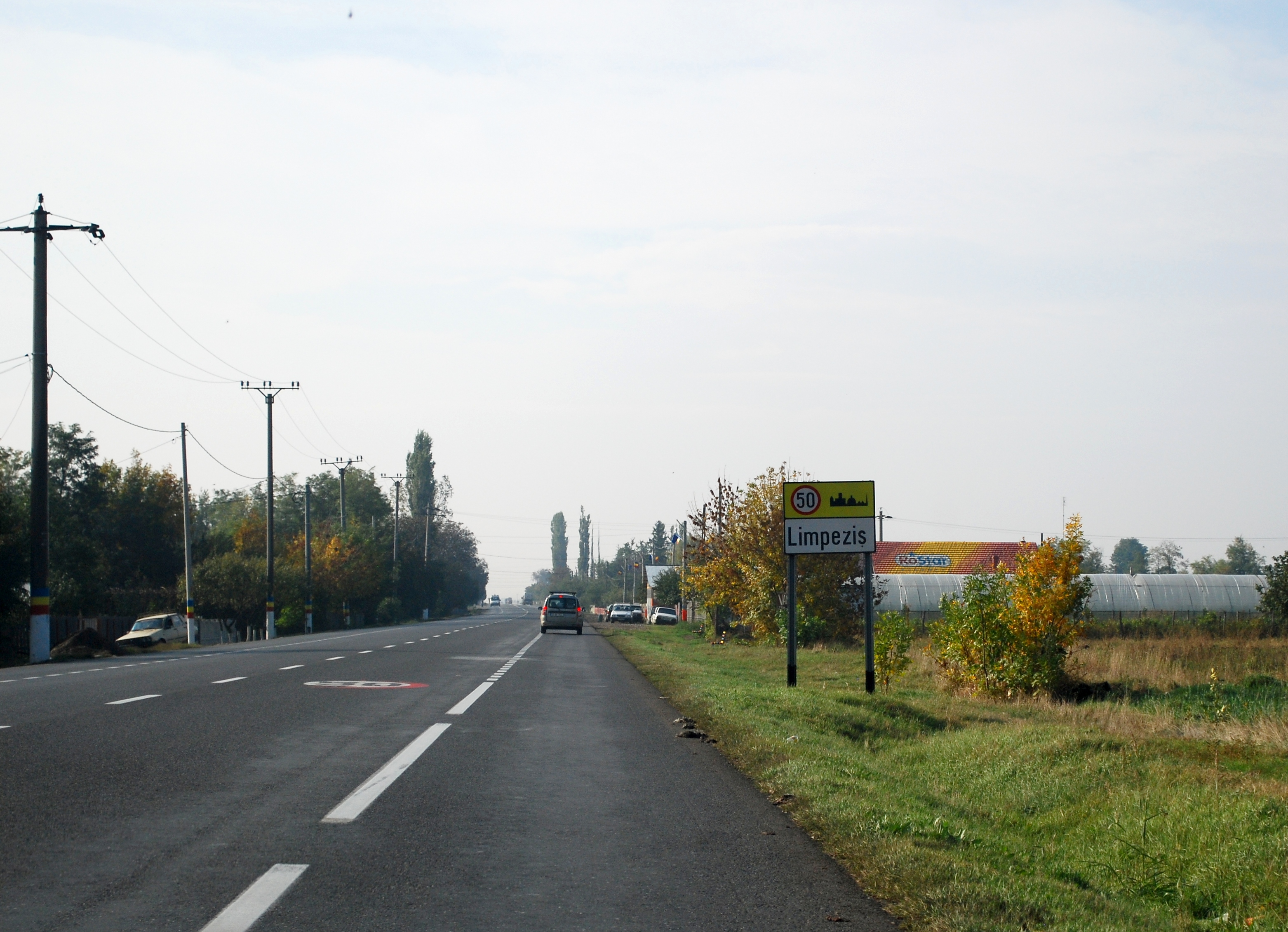
- DN2 entering the village of Limpeziș, Buzău County

Route information
- Part of E85
- Maintained by Compania Națională de Administrare a Infrastructurii Rutiere
- Length: 446 km (277 mi)

Major junctions
- From: Bucharest
- To: Siret (Ukrainian border)

Location
- Country: Romania
- Major cities: Bucharest, Buzău, Focșani, Bacău, Roman, Suceava

Highway system
- Roads in Romania; Highways

DN2 (Romanian: Drumul Național 2) is a national road in Romania which links Bucharest with the historical regions of Moldavia and Bukovina in north-east Romania. Recently upgraded, it is today one of the best-maintained roads in the country. The main cities linked by the DN2 are: Bucharest, Buzău, Focșani, Bacău, Roman, and Suceava.

Along the first 350 km from Bucharest to Săbăoani, near Roman the road has two lanes with one narrow emergency lane and reconstructed bridges, works which were conducted between 1993 and 2000. The road continues to Siret, at the Ukrainian border as a simple two-lanes road. Together with the adjacent section of DN28, Săbăoani – Iași, part of E583, the DN2 is currently Moldavia's backbone.

The DN2 is also considered Romania's most dangerous trunk road. The road has high accident rates, and the Bucharest–Săbăoani section is the most affected, due to drivers improperly using the emergency lanes. This has prompted the CNAIR (formerly CNADNR, the Romanian National Road Company) to upgrade a segment to a 2+1 road near the Sinești forest, the first 2+1 road in Romania. This upgrade was made in 2019, and due to the resulting low accident rates, it has been demanded that the rest of DN2 between Bucharest and Săbăoani, as well as DN28 to Iași be converted to a 2+1 road also.

The A7 motorway, together with the Bucharest – Ploiești section of the A3 motorway, will serve as a safer and high-speed alternative to the DN2 and will take part of traffic using the road when completed.

== See also ==
- Roads in Romania
- Transport in Romania

== Gallery ==
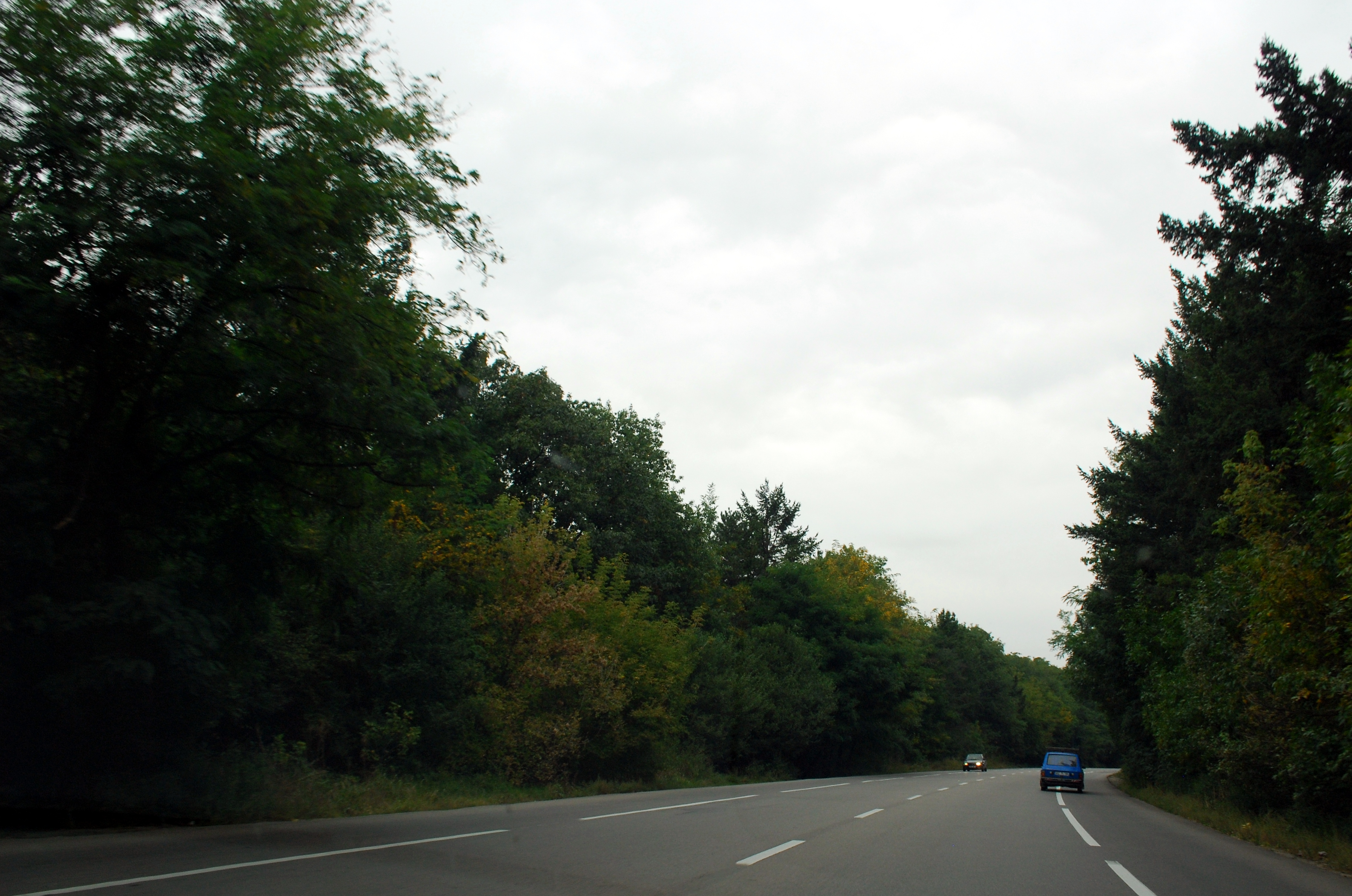
DN2 in the Sinești Forest, 2009, prior to it being converted to a 2+1 road.

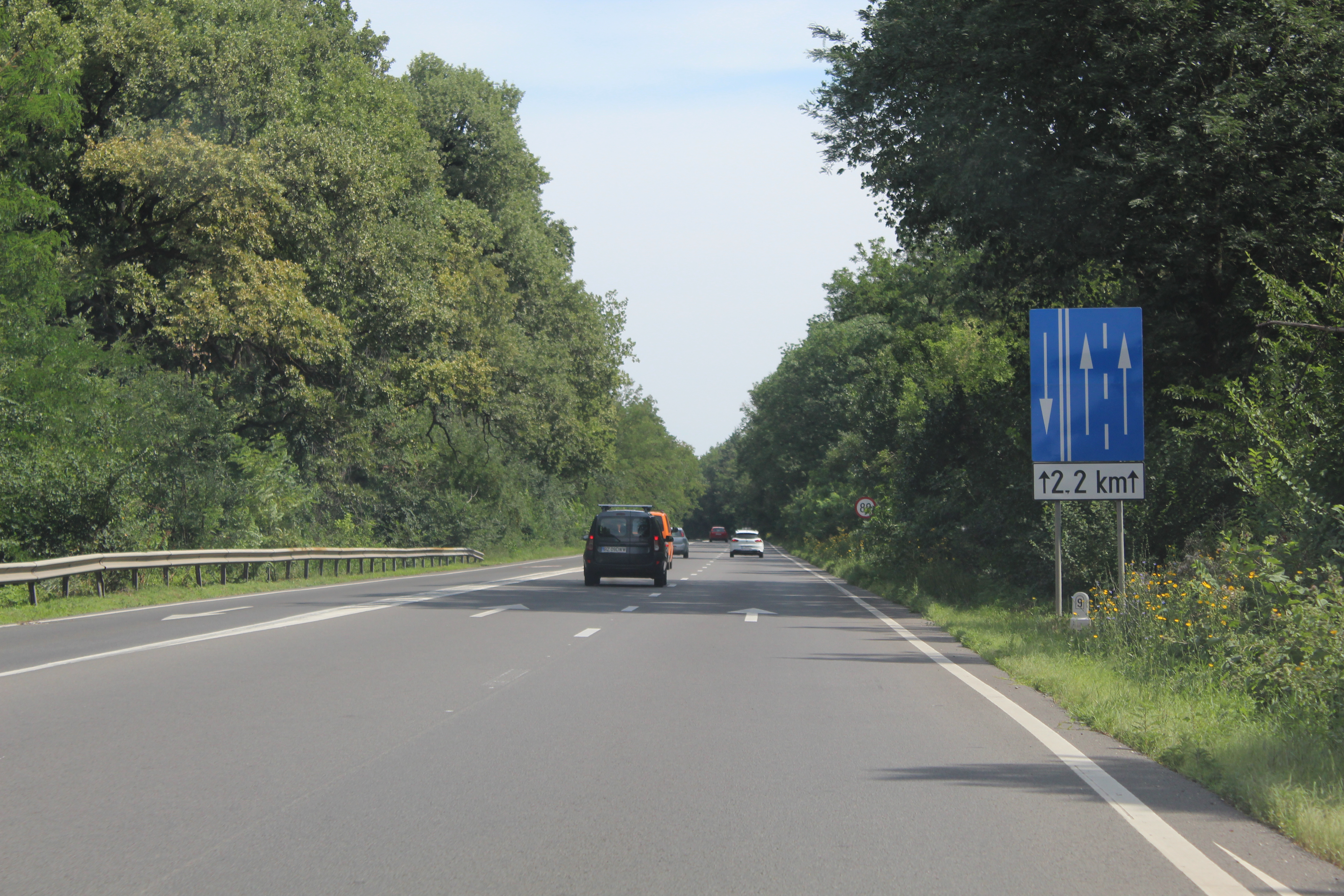
DN2 in the Sinești Forest, after conversion to a 2+1 road, 2022.

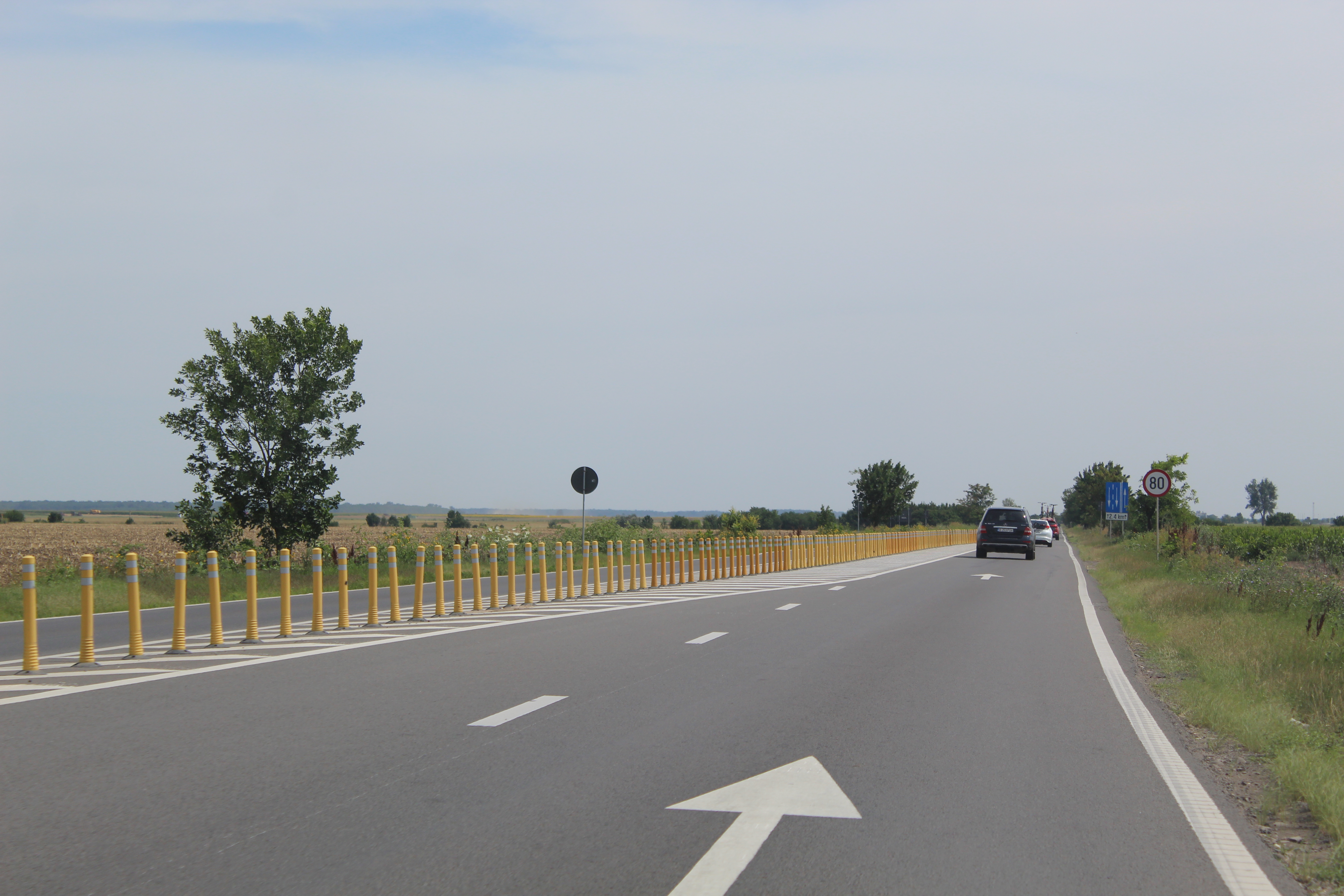
DN2 between Sinești and Movilița, with yellow delineators to indicate the end of a 2-lane stretch.

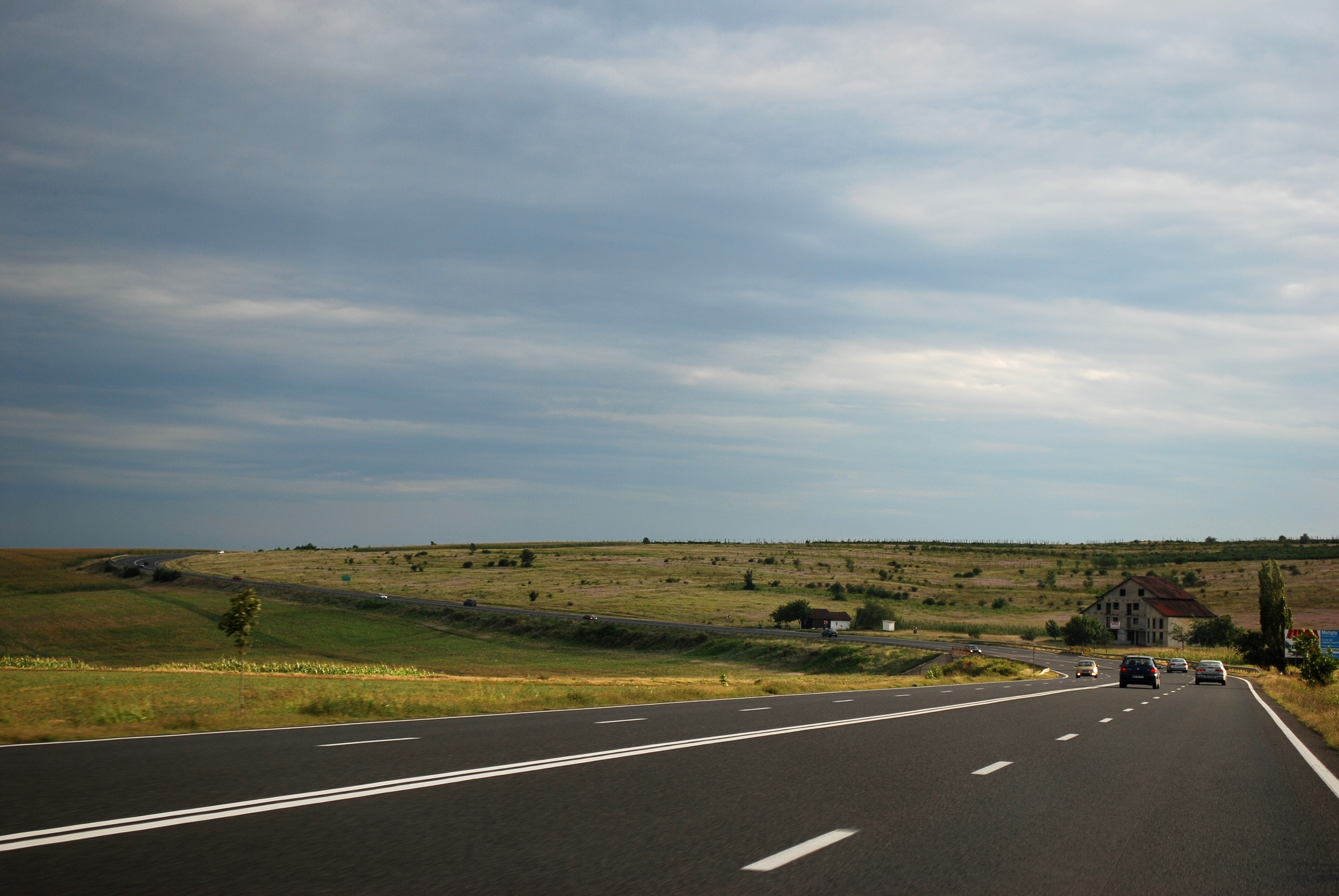
DN2 in Buzău County, at the "Comisoaia Cross". Here the road is an undivided two-lane road.

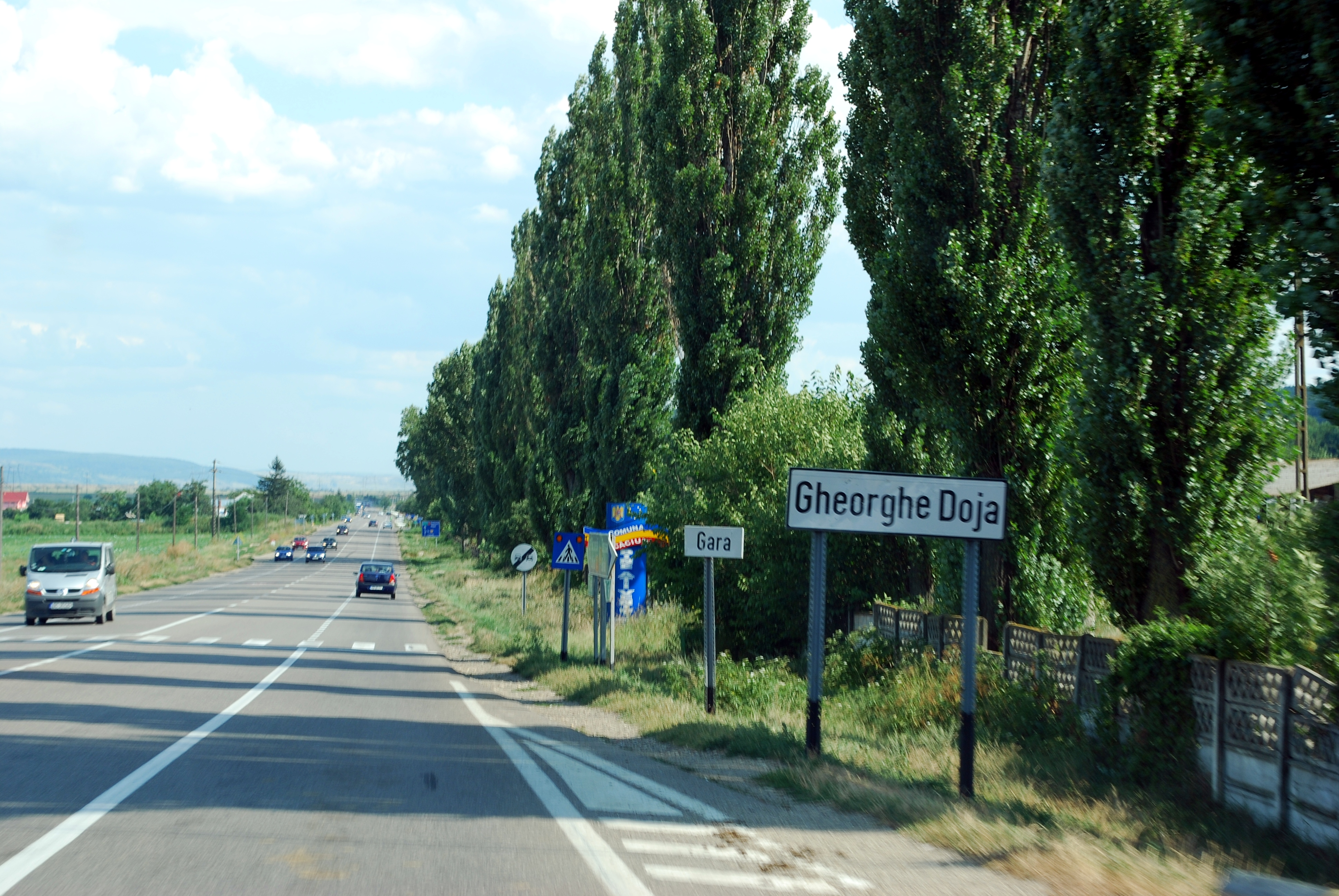
DN2 entering the village of Gheorghe Doja, Bacău County, where you can see the 13m road type: 1 lane with hard shoulders.
