= A10 motorway (Romania) =

Motorway in Romania

A10 motorway

- Map of the A10 motorway, as of July 2018

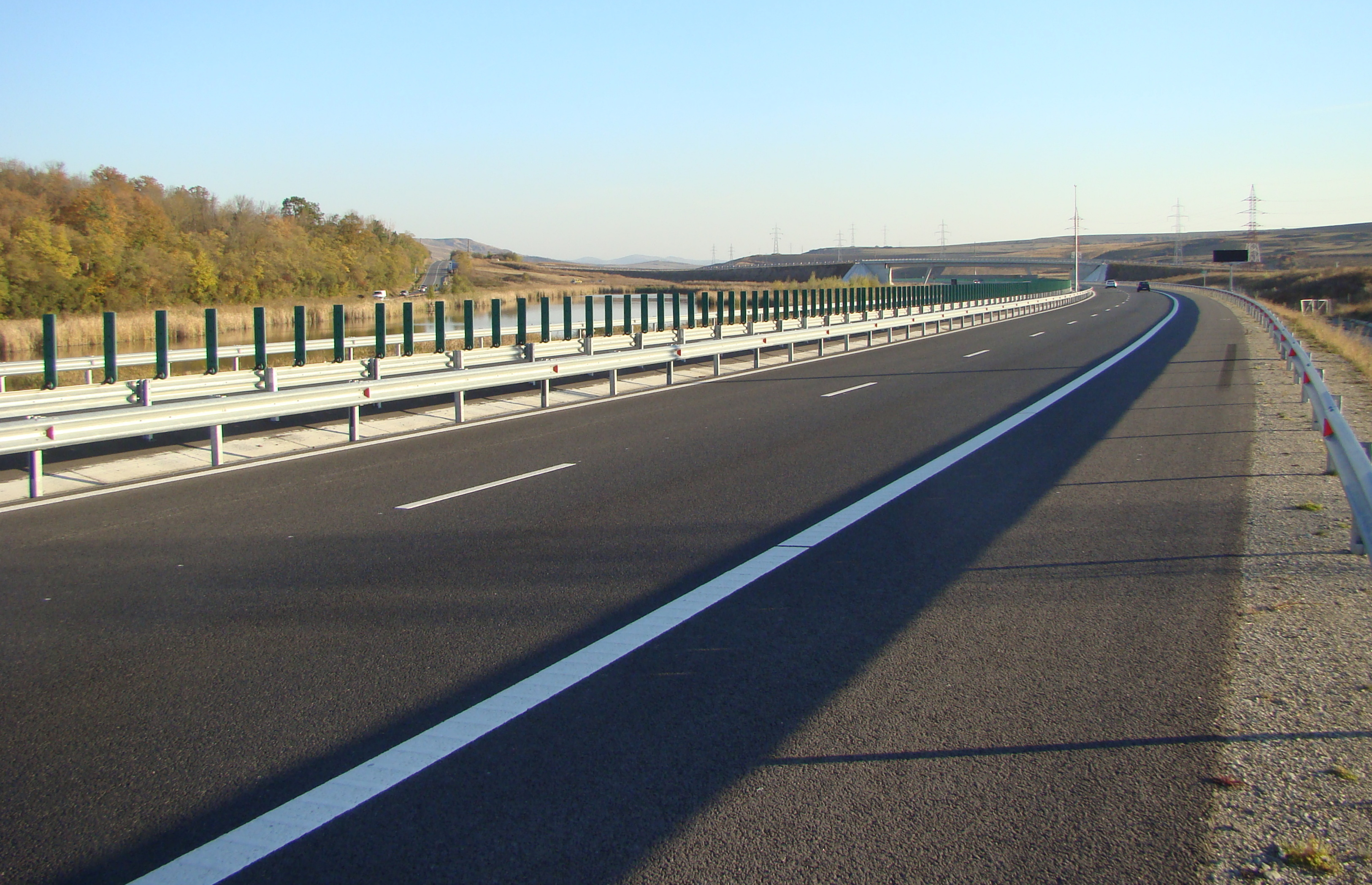

Route information
- Maintained by Compania Națională de Autostrăzi și Drumuri Naționale din România
- Length: 70 km (43 mi)
- Existed: 2018–present

Major junctions
- South end: A 1 near Sebeș
- North end: A 3 near Turda

Location
- Country: Romania
- Counties: Alba, Cluj
- Major cities: Alba Iulia, Aiud

Highway system
- Roads in Romania; Highways
← A 9	→ A 11

The A10 motorway (Romanian: Autostrada A10), also known as the Sebeș–Turda Motorway (Romanian: Autostrada Sebeș–Turda), is a motorway in the central-western part of Romania, connecting the A1 and A3 motorways, between the cities of Sebeș and Turda, also providing access to Alba Iulia and Aiud. It is 70 km long, with a total cost of 420 million euro, which is financed in proportion of 85% from the European Union funds, the rest of 15% being insured from the state budget. The motorway's construction was divided into four lots: works for lots 3 and 4 began on 20 May 2014, whereas for the other two lots began in 2015.

Since 2021, it has been operational on its entire length. Near Oiejdea, however, initially it was only operational on two lanes, due to a landslide that occurred in the area that was still not resolved. The motorway became fully operational on 19 November 2022.

== Sections ==
The construction was split into the following four segments, the contracts for which have been awarded in December 2013:

- Lot 1: 17.0 km, from the highway entrance near the interchange with the A1 motorway at Sebeș to Alba Iulia North interchange, awarded to the building consortium of Impresa Pizzarotti & Pomponio Construcții SRL, for a cost of 541,739,137 lei. Includes a complex node with A1.
- Lot 2: 24.3 km, from Alba Iulia North interchange to Aiud, awarded to building consortium of Aktor SA & Euroconstruct Trading '98 SRL for a cost of 549,332,493 lei.
- Lot 3: 12.5 km, from Aiud to the Decea interchange, awarded to the building consortium of Tirrena Scavi SpA and Società Italiana per Condotte d'Acqua, for a cost of 420,511,921 lei.
- Lot 4: 16.3 km, from the Decea interchange to the interchange with the A3 motorway near Turda, awarded to Porr Construct SRL and Porr Bau GmbH, for a cost of 470,004,894 lei.

== Openings timeline ==
- The Aiud – Turda segment (26.4 km) opened to traffic on 30 July 2018.
- The Sebeș – Alba Iulia North segment (14.8 km) opened to traffic on 3 December 2020.
- The Alba Iulia North – Aiud segment (28.8 km) opened to traffic on 30 November 2021.

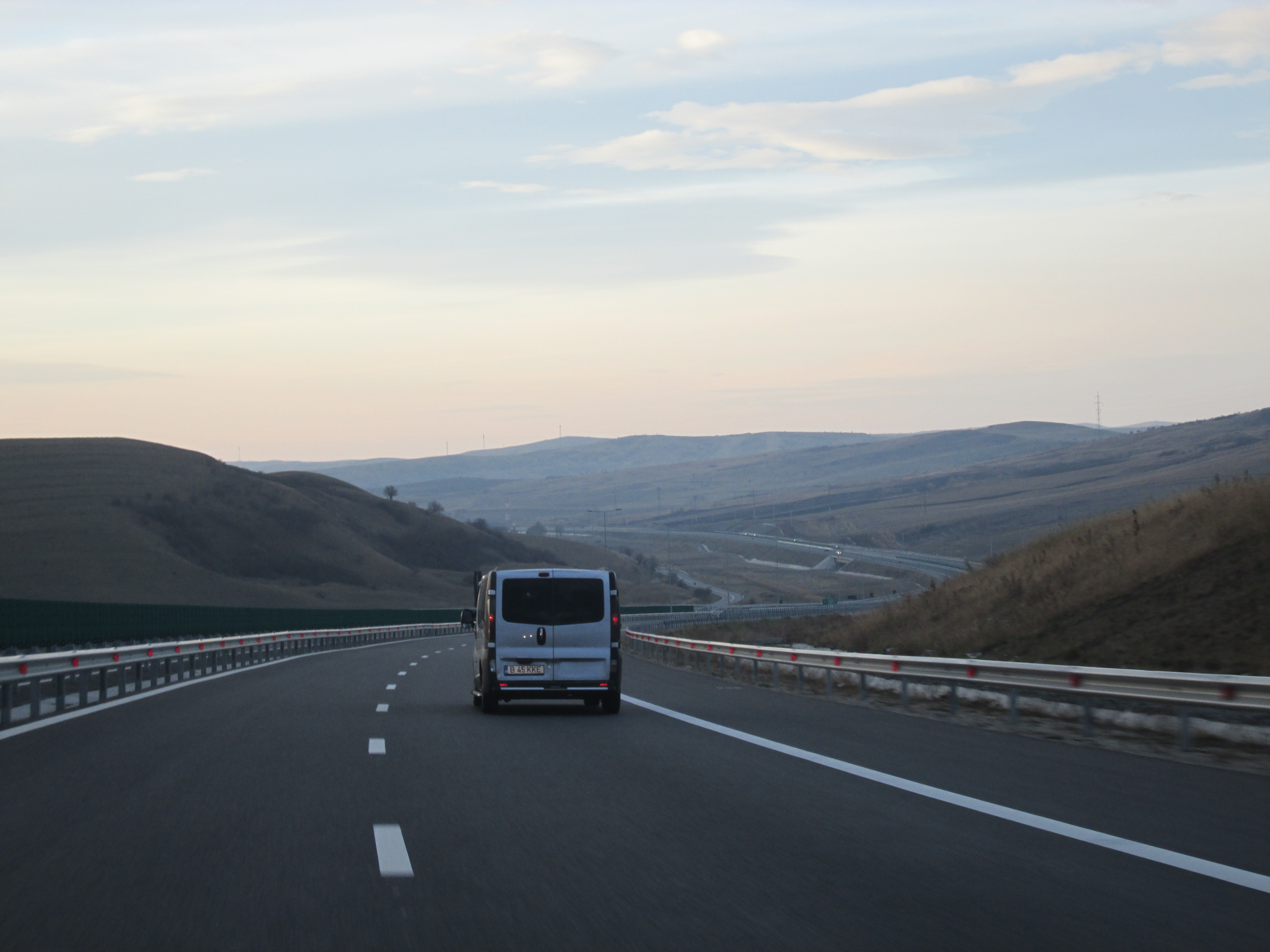
The A10 motorway near Unirea, October 2018

== Exit list ==
County	Location	km	mi	Destinations	Notes
Alba	Sebeș	0	0.0	A 1 – Deva, Timișoara, Sibiu, Bucharest	Southern terminus
Alba	Sebeș	0	0.0	DN1 – Sebeș North	
Alba	Alba Iulia	4	2.5	Short-term parking	
Alba	Alba Iulia	8	5.0	DN1 – Alba Iulia South	
Alba	Alba Iulia	17	11	DN1 – Alba Iulia North	
Alba	Teiuș	23	14	Short-term parking	
Alba	Teiuș	26	16	DN14B – Teiuș, Blaj	
Alba	Aiud	44	27	DN1 – Aiud	
Alba	Aiud	46	29	Short-term parking	
Alba	Decea	53	33	DN1 – Decea, Unirea, Ocna Mureș	
Alba	Unirea	57	35	U-turn exit	Northbound only
Alba	Unirea	60	37	Short-term parking	
Alba	Unirea	61	38	U-turn exit	Northbound only Centru de Întreținere și Coordonare (C.I.C)
Cluj	Mihai Viteazu	70	43	DN1 – Turda	
Cluj	Mihai Viteazu	70	43	A 3 – Târgu Mureș, Brașov, Cluj-Napoca, Borș	Northern terminus
1.000 mi = 1.609 km; 1.000 km = 0.621 mi: Unopened

== See also ==
- Roads in Romania
- Transport in Romania
