= Sibiu–Bacău Motorway =

Planned motorway in Romania

A13 motorway

Route information
- Maintained by Compania Națională de Autostrăzi și Drumuri Naționale din România
- Length: 0 km (0 mi; 0 ft) 282 km (175 mi) planned 68 km (42 mi) under construction

Major junctions
- From: A 1 near Boița
- A 3 near Făgăraș; A 3 near Brașov
- To: A 7 near Răcăciuni

Location
- Country: Romania

Highway system
- Roads in Romania; Highways
← A 12	→ A 14

The Sibiu–Bacău Motorway (Romanian: Autostrada Sibiu–Bacău) is a planned motorway in Romania, with some sections currently under construction. It is intended to connect the counties of Sibiu, Brașov, Covasna and Bacău, along a total estimated length of approximately 282 kilometres (175 miles). The project is divided into three main sections: Boița – Făgăraș, Făgăraș – Brașov (also part of the A3 motorway), and Brașov – Răcăciuni.

== History and status ==
From Boița (junction with A1), it will follow the Olt River valley before running through Avrig, Cârțișoara, Voila to a junction with A3 east of Făgăraș, with which it intersects until west of Brașov, where there's another junction with A3. The Făgăraș – Brașov section will be shared with A3 motorway.

This 120 km (75 mi) long section was initially planned as an expressway as an alternative to the National Road 1 (DN1) between Sibiu and Făgăraș at 72.57 kilometres (45.09 mi) long and with an estimated cost of 614 mil. €. In 2013, the Romanian government has reportedly changed the plans in order to provide the connection from Sibiu to Bucharest alternative to A1 via Pitești as part of the Trans European Transport Network, thus implementing it as a motorway rather than expressway.

The section between Brașov and Bacău was initially designated as the A5 motorway, which was planned to link Brașov to the city of Bacău through the Oituz Pass. Following the decision to merge this corridor with the Boița–Făgăraș–Brașov route, the project was reclassified and incorporated into the A13 motorway, thus forming a single continuous west–east connection between Sibiu and Bacău.

== Boița – Făgăraș section ==
The feasibility study and the technical project for the Boița – Făgăraș section (68.05 km (42.28 mi)) were approved in December 2021 and January 2022, respectively. The total value of the investment was estimated at 7.5 billion RON.

On 5 May 2023, the auction of the lot 4 (16.26 km (10.10 mi)) of the Boița - Făgăraș section of the motorway was won by the Turkish association Makyol - Yapi. The total term length is 48 months, (12 months for the project stage and 36 months for the execution stage).

On 20 September 2023, the contract for the design and execution of the lot 3 (17.61 km (10.94 mi)) was signed with the same association Makyol - Yapi.

Lot & route	Length (km)	Builder	Status
Lot 1: Boița – Avrig – Mârșa	14.25	Makyol Insaat Sanayi ve Ticaret A.S.	In progress (construction)
Lot 2: Mârșa – Arpașu de Jos	19.92	Makyol Insaat Sanayi ve Ticaret A.S.	In progress (construction)
Lot 3: Arpașu de Jos – Sâmbăta de Sus	17.61	Makyol Insaat Sanayi ve Ticaret A.S.	In progress (construction)
Lot 4: Sâmbăta de Sus – Făgăraș	16.26	Makyol Insaat Sanayi ve Ticaret A.S.	In progress (construction)

== Făgăraș – Brașov section ==
The Făgăraș–Brașov section of the A13 motorway is planned to connect the city of Făgăraș with the metropolitan area of Brașov, running entirely through Brașov County over an estimated length of approximately 46 kilometres. The contract for the feasibility study and technical design was awarded in 2021 to Search Corporation S.R.L. The project is valued at approximately 18 million lei and includes route analysis, topographical studies and environmental documentation. Preparatory design activities and field investigations are currently underway.

== Brașov – Răcăciuni (Bacău County) section ==
From Brașov, the motorway will cross through the plains of the Szekely Land (Ținutul Secuiesc), reaching the cities of Sfântu Gheorghe and Târgu Secuiesc, then cross the Eastern Romanian Carpathians through the Oituz Pass to reach Onești, then the junction with A7 near Răcăciuni towards Bacău (north) and Focșani (south).

This 162 km (101 mi) long section is also the most difficult section to build, as it crosses the Carpathians, with an estimated construction cost of over €2 billion. The contract for the feasibility study and the technical project of this section of the motorway was signed in May 2020, but the inability of Search Corporation (with whom the contract was signed) to cover the costs of geotechnical studies resulted in a termination of the contract in June 2022.

Subsequently, in July 2024, a new contract for the updated feasibility studies and technical documentation was awarded to Consitrans S.R.L., under the coordination of the National Company for Road Investments (CNIR), and the section is currently under active feasibility studies and field investigations.
