= Plug-in electric vehicles in Romania =

As of December 2024, there were almost 55,000 electric vehicles registered in Romania, out of which 49,594 were passenger cars, 1,652 motorcycles, 1,503 buses and mini-buses, 1,681 trucks, 20 tractors and 13 special purpose electrice vehicles.

As of April 2023, there were around 40,000 electric vehicles (including plug-in hybrid vehicles) in Romania, equivalent to 0.5% of all cars in the country. As of March 2023, 8.6% of new cars registered in Romania were fully electric, and 3.4% were plug-in hybrid.

As of 2022, the most popular electric car model in Romania was the Dacia Spring.

== Government policy ==
As of May 2023, the Romanian government does not tax electric cars. As of July 2022, the Romanian government offers subsidies of up to 51,000 lei for the replacement of a gasoline-powered car with an electric car.

== Charging stations ==
As of April 2023, there were around 1,600 public charging stations in Romania.
