= Copisa =

Barcelonan construction contracting firm established in 1959

- Industry: Engineering
- Founded: 1959
- Headquarters: L'Hospitalet de Llobregat, Barcelona, Catalonia, Spain

Copisa is a construction contracting firm, established in 1959, with headquarters in L'Hospitalet de Llobregat, near Barcelona, Catalonia, Spain. They are involved in civil engineering, building restoration and public infrastructure.

== History ==
=== 1959–1970 ===
The company originated during the electrification of Catalonia during the 1950s; an effort headed by Fuerzas Eléctricas de Cataluña (FECSA). In 1959, the company was behind the founding of Constructora Pireneica S.A. (shortened to "Copisa"), with the aim of carrying out building work for FECSA in the Val d'Aran, in the heart of the Lleida Pyrenees. Soon afterwards, in the nearby Vall de Cardós, Copisa started work on a huge hydroelectric project. For 15 years, the company dedicated human and technical resources to all aspects of this construction project, which consolidated Copisa's position as a firm experienced in large scale, complex building work.

=== 1970–1980 ===
Copisa increased its specialisation in the energy sector, with projects such as the thermal power station in Utrillas (Teruel Province) and the thermal power station in Sant Adrià de Besòs. Participation in the construction of the Ascó and Vandellòs II nuclear power plants represented a major leap in technological and industrial capacity. In the area of civil engineering, Copisa took on projects such as canals, roads and bridges, supply infrastructures, sanitation and water purification plants, among others. In the field of construction, it began building homes, hotels, housing developments, schools and sports facilities.

=== 1980–1990 ===
In the third decade of Copisa's history a major project was the construction of the Estany Gento-Sallente reversible hydraulic power plant in Lleida. Examples in the field of civil engineering are the viaduct over the Alcanadre River and the Monrepós tunnels. In construction, two projects became architectural icons, the Institut National d'Educació Física de Catalunya (National Physical Education Institute of Catalonia) in Barcelona, and the Sports Pavilion of the club Joventut Badalona. Finally, in the field of heritage site restoration, the company rehabilitated the Roman Forum and the remodelling of La Seo Cathedral in Zaragoza.

=== 1990–2000 ===
In 1991, the company began operating as a property developer. A few years later, it moved into a new business area: the construction of student dormitories as concessions and high-speed railways.

=== 2000 to present ===
A growth area is the restoration of architectural heritage sites and the environmental sector. Copisa applies methods, technologies and materials to make its works more sustainable; and participates in renewable energy implementation projects, such as photovoltaic solar energy installations.
