= UMB Grup =

Romanian company

UMB Grup is a privately held company of Romania, mainly active in the construction business (through it subsidiaries "Spedition UMB" and "Tehnostrade") and in the transport and sale of petrol. The company is owned by the Romanian entrepreneur Dorinel Umbrărescu, who previously owned Banca Română de Credite și Investiții (formerly ATEbank Romania), and who is commonly known as Romania's "asphalt king".

It has expanded into other domains (steel, energy, banking) through acquisitions. Its subsidiary UMB Steel has been very active acquiring steel works and energy.

== Projects ==
The "Spedition UMB" subsidiary was involved in Romania in the construction of segments of roads, including but not limited to:

- The A3 motorway (between Moara Vlăsiei – Ploiești, 43.0 km, and Gilău – Nădășelu – Mihăiești – Zimbor – Poarta Sălajului, entirely 51.8 km)
- The A1 motorway (the lot 1 of the Lugoj – Timișoara motorway, between Giarmata – Izvin, 9.5 km, widely acclaimed at the time for being opened to traffic ahead of the deadline; and the lot 4 of the Deva – Lugoj motorway, between Ilia and Șoimuș, 22.1 km)
- The A7 motorway (the Bacău bypass, 30.6 km, of which 16.2 km of motorway)
- The DX12 expressway (segments Balș – Slatina (39.8 km), Slatina – Colonești (31.7 km), Colonești – Pitești (31.8 km); most of the total length of 121 km of the DX12).

== Acquisitions ==
The "UMB Steel" subsidiary was created on Sep 17, 2007 and has made the following acquisitions:

- Oțelu Rosu - Dec 2024 for RON 140 million (€28M). The plant has been idle since 2012 and its buildings have been neglected and vandalized while idle. UMB Steel has started a €300M restoration project. There is a very active youtube channel dedicated to the reconstruction activity: Natură și Infrastructură. Here is a list planned improvements. Energy efficiency, sustainability and green steel are common themes in all these announcements:
  - Continuous mill technology (CMT) from SMS Group (Germany) designed to produce 700M tons of straight bars, compact coils and wire rod straight from scrap. It will be the first in Europe.
  - New Electric Arc Furnace (EAF) provided by Saralle (Spain).
  - New facility for producing high-strength steel strands.
- Combinatul Siderurgic Hunedoara (ArcelorMittal Hunedoara) - April 2026 for €12.5 million ($14.8M).
- Halânga Power Station - Oct 2026 for €30M.
- As of Nov 2026, it is one of the 5 companies interested in acquiring Liberty Steel Galați. The deal is expected to be over €200M.
