= Moara Vlăsiei =

- Commune
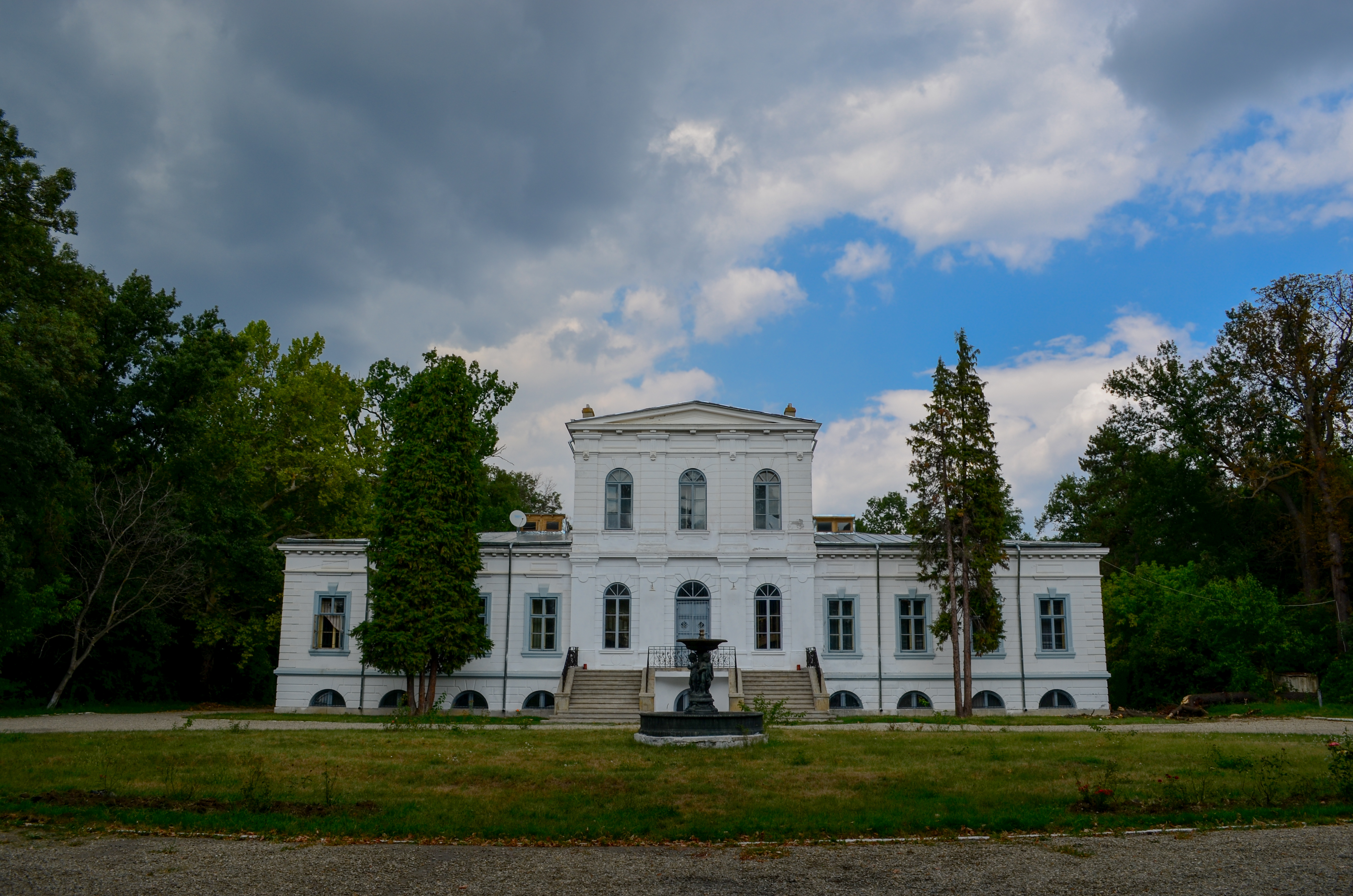
- Alexandru Ghica Palace in Căciulați

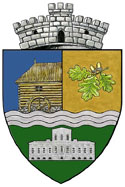
- Coat of arms

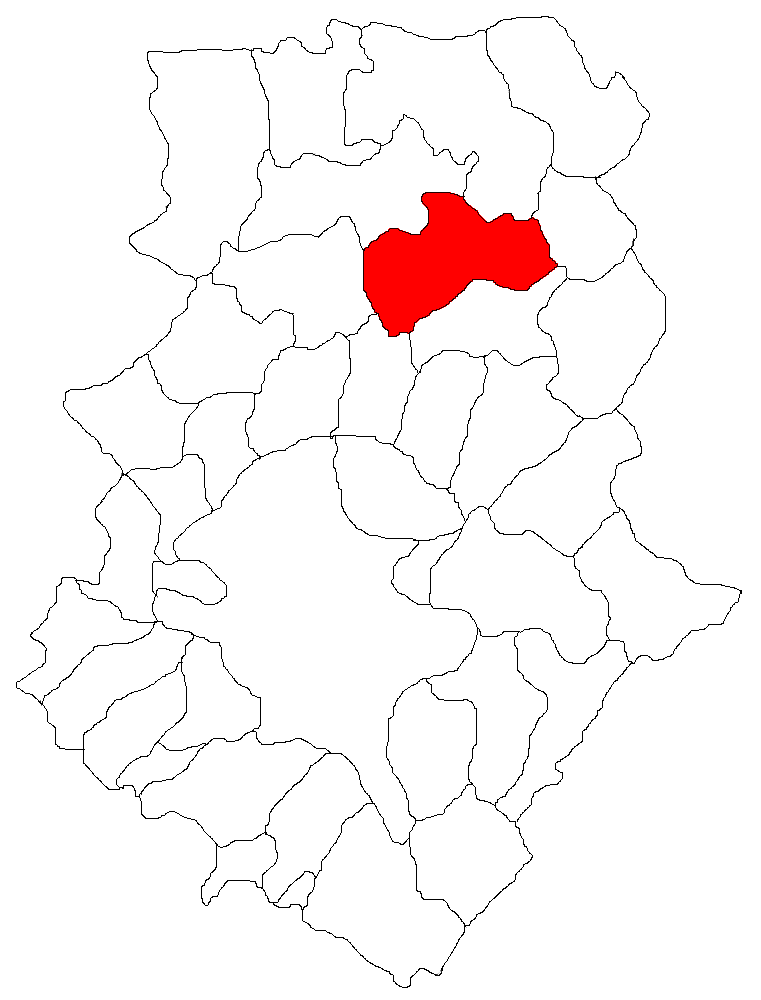
- Location in Ilfov County

- Location in Romania
- Coordinates: 44°39′N 26°13′E
- Country: Romania
- County: Ilfov

Government
  - Mayor (2024–2028): Andrei Filip (PNL)
- Area: 63 km^{2} (24 sq mi)
- Elevation: 87 m (285 ft)
- Population (2021-12-01): 6,597
  - Density: 100/km^{2} (270/sq mi)
- Time zone: UTC+02:00 (EET)
  - Summer (DST): UTC+03:00 (EEST)
- Postal code: 077130
- Area code: +40 x1
- Vehicle reg.: IF
- Website: www.primariamoara-vlasiei.ro

Moara Vlăsiei is a commune in the northern part of Ilfov County, Muntenia, Romania. Its name means "Mill of Wallachia[n forest]", and was called Căciulați until 1968, when its administrative center was moved from the village of Căciulați to Moara Vlăsiei (a village previously named Moara Săracă— the Poor Mill). It is composed of two villages, Căciulați and Moara Vlăsiei.

The village is home to Moara Vlăsiei Cricket Ground, the only cricket field in Romania.

Train stations in Căciulați and Moara Vlăsiei serve the CFR Line 700, which connects Bucharest with the Moldovan border at Giurgiulești.

Historical population
Year	Pop.	±%
2002	5,833	—
2011	6,307	+8.1%
2021	6,597	+4.6%
Source: Census data
