= Transport in Romania =

Transportation infrastructure in Romania is the property of the state, and is administered by the Ministry of Transport and Infrastructure, Constructions and Tourism, except when operated as a concession, in which case the concessions are made by the Ministry of Administration and Interior.

The country's most important waterway is the river Danube. The largest port is that of Constanța, which is the second largest port in the Black Sea.

With over 13 million passengers Bucharest Airport is a major international airport and European transportation hub. Air travel is used for greater distances within Romania but faces extreme competition from the state-owned CFR's rail network. Public transport is available in most areas.

== History ==
Romania has a system of large, navigable rivers, such as the Danube, Olt and Mureș that cross the country.

The first important human improvements were the Roman roads linking major settlements and providing quick passage for marching armies.

== Railway transport ==
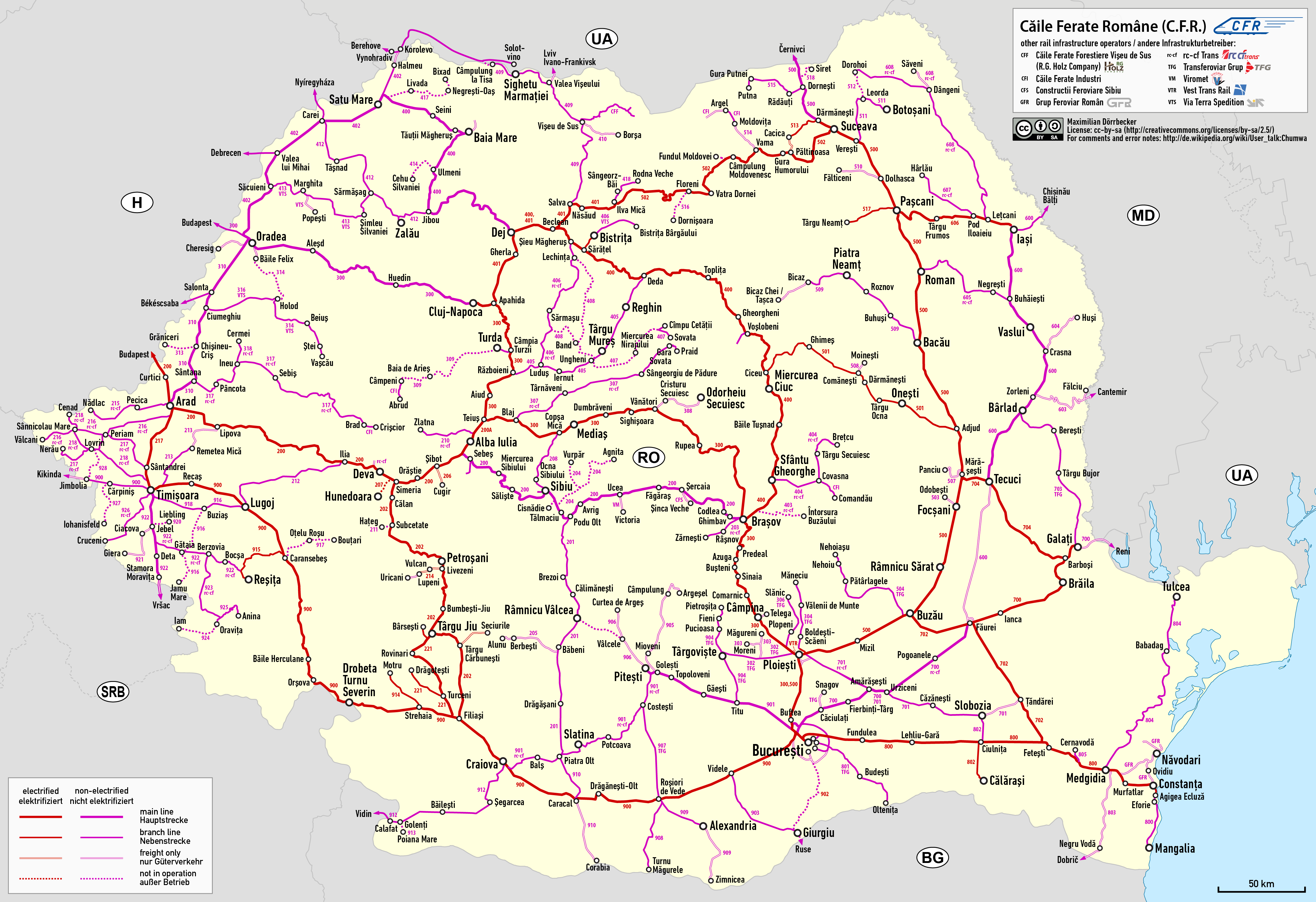
Map of Romania's railway system

A growing number of Romania's major cities have modern tram or light rail networks, including Bucharest, Timișoara, Cluj-Napoca and Oradea. Recently the tram has seen a revival with experiments such as ground level power supply in Oradea.

== Roads and automotive transport ==
Romania's road network

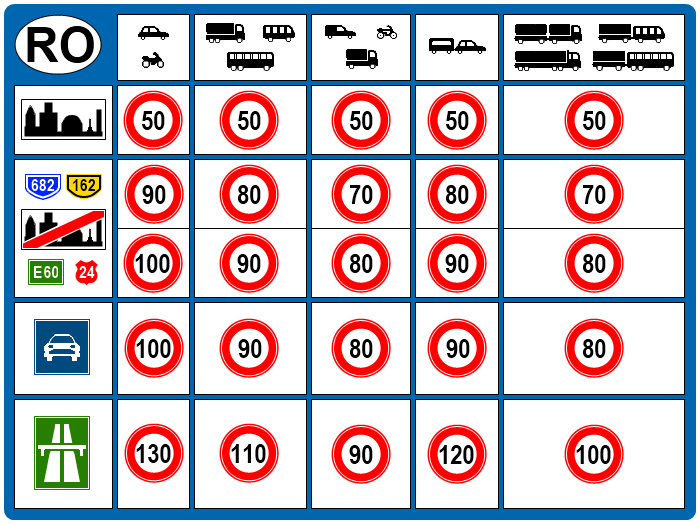
Speed Limits in Romania based on road type and vehicle category

According to the CIA Factbook, in 2022 Romania had a total road network of 85,387 km, ranking 59 in the world.

Romania's National Institute of Statistics (INS) 2022 transport report stated that total road network is 86,336 km: 41,653 km (48,2%) modernized roads (94,1% with asphalt pavements of heavy/medium type and 5.9% with concrete), 20,956 km (24.3%) with light asphalt road clothing, 15,713 km (18,2%) stone paving (such as sett paving or cobblestone roads) and 8,014 km (9,3%) dirt roads.

=== Motorways ===
Motorways are identified by A followed by a number. As of December 2024, Romania has 1,217.77 km of highway completed with more under planning or construction. In recent years, a master plan for the national motorway network has been developed and approved by the European Commission in July 2015.

Currently the A1 motorway, part of the northern branch of the Pan European IV Corridor, is open on 456 km. Under construction are the segments Curtea de Argeș—Pitești (30 km). Margina—Holdea (13 km) and Boița—Curtea de Argeș (73 km) have yet to start construction. It has a total length of 576 km.

The A2 motorway was the first motorway in Romania opened on all its segments, with a length of 205 km. It links Bucharest to Constanța (junction with A4)

The A3 motorway, which is the largest motorway project in Eastern Europe with a length of 588 km from Bucharest to Oradea (near the Hungarian border), is open on 173 km. The segment Chețani—Câmpia Turzii (15.7 km) is under construction. All segments between Nădășelu and Oradea have been tendered by the end of 2020. The remaining sections are still in the planned phase.

The A4 motorway is operational on 22 km, from Ovidiu to Agigea (also known as the Constanța bypass). Another 45 km are planned, from Agigea to Vama Veche (at the border with Bulgaria).

The A6 motorway is also part of the Pan European IV Corridor, but near Lugoj it starts as the southern branch, that connects the cities of Sofia, Istanbul and Athens. It has a length of 270 km, of which 11.4 km between A1 and Lugoj bypass are open.

The A7 motorway starts from the A3 (near Ploiești), linking it to the region of Moldavia and further to the Ukrainian border. From its planned 450 km, 16 km are open near Bacău, which serve as the bypass for that city.

The A10 motorway is the first motorway which links two motorways in Romania: A1 (near Sebeș) and A3 (near Turda). It has 70 km, and since 2021, it has been operational on its entire length.

The A11 motorway is a 135 km motorway, the second to connect A1 with A3 this time between Arad and Oradea, of which a 2.4 km stretch near Arad called the Arad bypass is open.

=== Statistics ===
According to the Romanian "Direcţia Regim Permise de Conducere şi Înmatriculare a Vehiculelor", in 2017 there were 7,635,000 vehicles (of which 1,320,230 in Bucharest), and 8,900,000 in 2019. It is estimated that by 2021 there will be more than 10 million registered cars in Romania.

In 2016 62% of road fatalities occurred in urban area, Romania has 1189 fatalities in urban area, that is 60 killed in urban area per million inhabitants, or 3.2 times more than EU average of 19. This makes Romania the EU member state with the most fatalities per million population, 42.9% more fatalities than the second country, Hungary.

== Metro ==
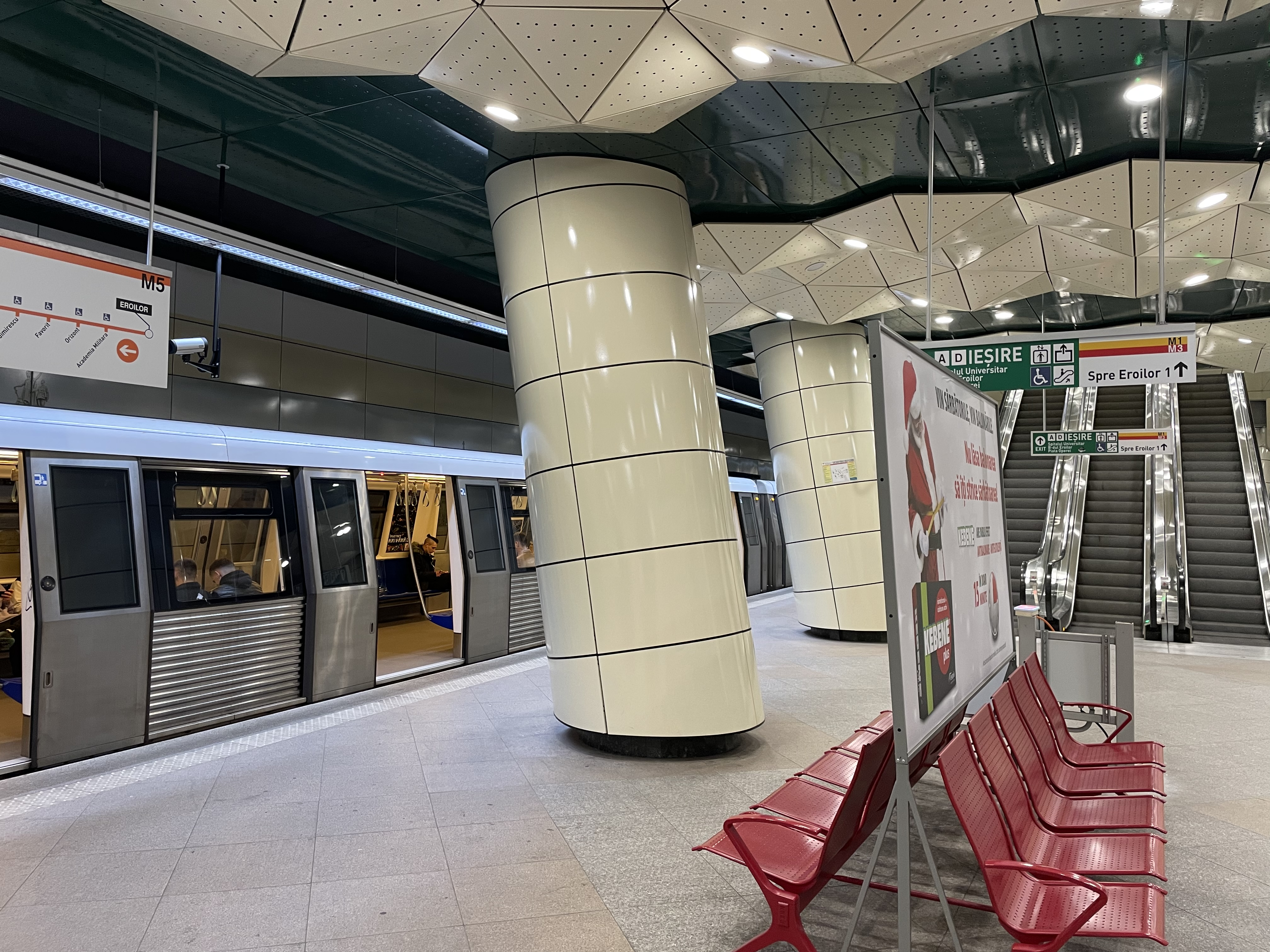
Eroilor, one of the metro stations in Bucharest

Bucharest is the only city in Romania which has an underground railway system, comprising both the Bucharest Metro and the Bucharest Light rail system of the Regia Autonomă de Transport București.

The Bucharest Metro forms the backbone of Bucharest public transport network. Bucharest has a fairly extensive subway system consisting of five lines (M1, M2, M3, M4, and M5) run by Metrorex. In total, the network is 80.1 km (49.8 mi) long and has 64 stations, with 1.5 km (0.9 mi) average distance between stops. It is one of the fastest ways to get around the city. The oldest metro line is M1, which was opened in 1979. The newest metro line is M5, which was opened in 2020. A sixth metro line, M6 line, is currently under construction.

A second metro station, the Cluj-Napoca Metro, is currently under construction.

== Air transport ==
The air traffic in Romania reached 20.28 million passengers in 2017 and 21 million passengers in 2022.

The national carrier of Romania is TAROM, while Wizz Air has the largest share of Romania's air transport market.

=== Airports ===
There are 20 airports in Romania (estimated as of 2006).

- Airports – with paved runways : 25
  - Runways over 3,047 m: 5
  - Runways from 2,438 to 3,047 m: 8
  - Runways from 1,524 to 2,437 m: 12
- Airports – with unpaved runways : 36
  - Runways from 1,524 to 2,437 m: 2
  - Runways from 914 to 1,523 m: 11
  - Runways under 914 m: 23
- Heliports 1 (2006)

see: List of airlines of Romania and List of airports in Romania

== Water transport ==
Romanian companies operate over 700 ships of which 400 are registered in Romania. Romania's 110 shipping firms employ 12,500 personnel at sea and 15,500 on shore. Each year, 105 million tonnes of goods and 1 million passengers are transported by sea. Marine transport is responsible for 52% of Romania's imports and exports.

=== Ports ===
- With terminals:
  - Port of Constanța (the largest port and shipyard in the Black Sea and one of the busiest ports in Europe)
  - Port of Galați (on the Danube)
  - Brăila (on the Danube)
  - Tulcea (on the Danube)
- Other Black Sea ports:
  - Mangalia
  - Sulina
  - Năvodari
- Other ports on the Danube:
  - Giurgiu
  - Drobeta-Turnu Severin
  - Oltenița
- Ports on the Danube-Black Sea Canal:
  - Cernavodă
  - Poarta Albă
  - Constanța Sud
  - Agigea

=== Waterways ===
As of 2006, there are 1,731 km of navigable waterways of which:

- 1,075 km on Danube River
- 524 km on secondary branches
- 132 km on canals

In 2004, according to europaworld.com, 19 million passenger-km and 4 billion ton-km were carried through these waterways.

=== Merchant fleet ===
The merchant marine has seen a dramatic drop in capacity during the first decade of the 21st century:

- from 142 ships (1,000 gross tonnage (GT) or over) totaling 1,154,127 GT/1,612,314 tonnes deadweight (DWT) 1999
- to 19 ships (1,000 GT or over) 146,307 GT/165,548 DWT in 2007.

These include: 13 cargo ships, 1 passenger ship, 2 passenger/cargo ships, 2 petroleum tankers, 1 roll-on/roll-off.

50 other ships are registered in other countries: Cambodia 1, Georgia 15, North Korea 6, Malta 10, Marshall Islands 1, Panama 8, Sierra Leone 2, Saint Kitts and Nevis 1, Saint Vincent and the Grenadines 1, Syria 4, Tuvalu 1, unknown 4.

=== International sea-borne freight traffic ===
- Goods loaded: 18.2 million tons
- Goods unloaded: 22.3 million tons (2004)

== Pipelines ==
- Oil: 2,427 km
- Natural gas: 3,508 km (2006)

== See also ==
- List of airports in Romania
- Automotive industry in Romania
- License plates in Romania
- Highways in Romania
- Plug-in electric vehicles in Romania
- Tourism in Romania
