= Dumbrava, Prahova =

Dumbrava
- Commune
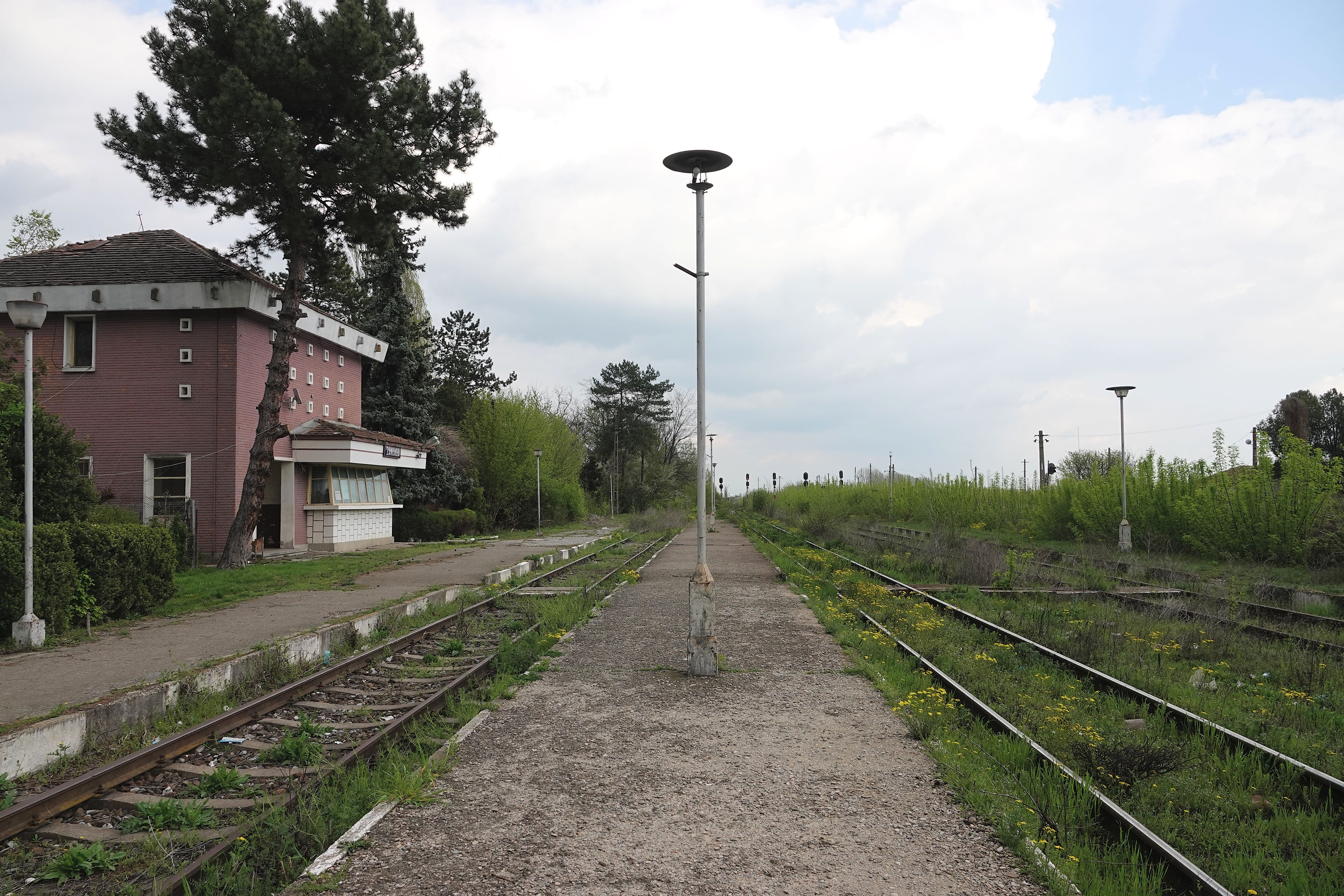
- Zănoaga train station

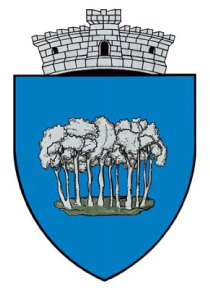
- Coat of arms

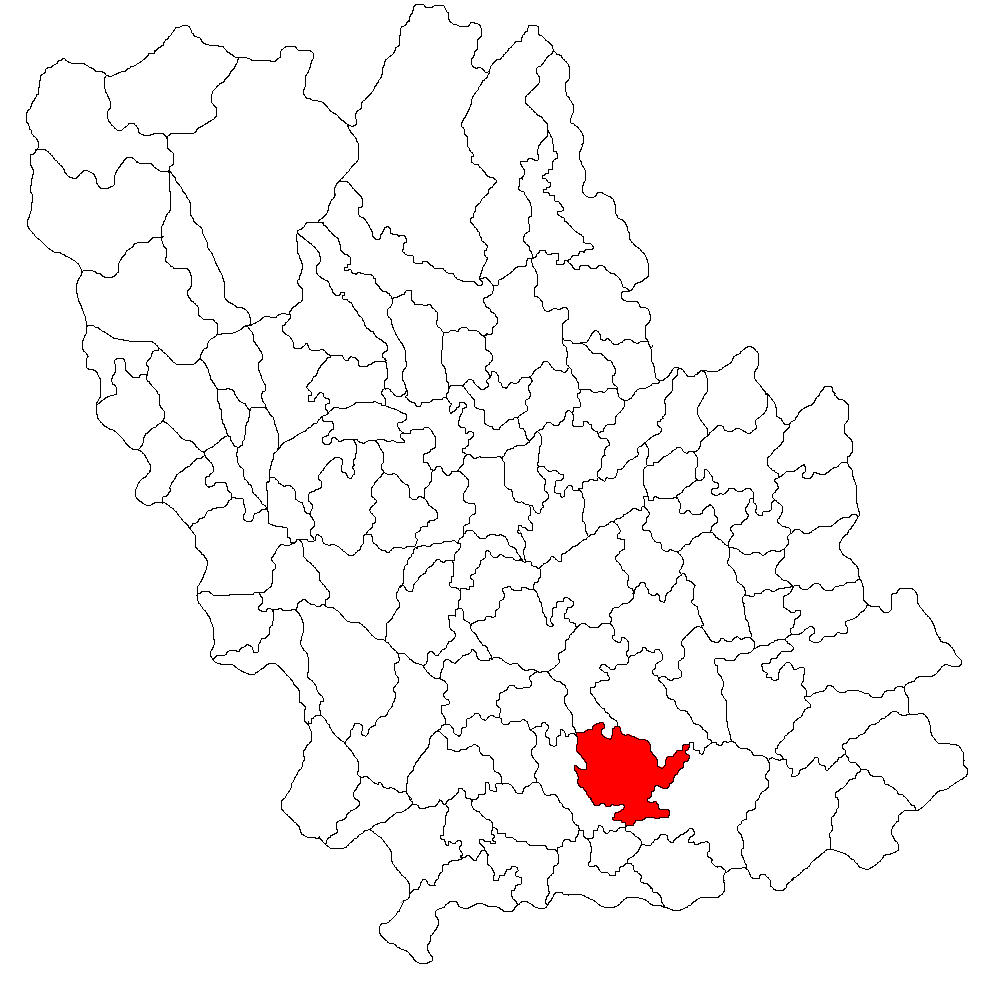
- Location in Prahova County

- Location in Romania
- Coordinates: 44°52′N 26°12′E
- Country: Romania
- County: Prahova

Government
  - Mayor (2024–2028): Marian Apostol (PNL)
- Area: 63.56 km^{2} (24.54 sq mi)
- Elevation: 99 m (325 ft)
- Population (2021-12-01): 4,342
  - Density: 68.31/km^{2} (176.9/sq mi)
- Time zone: UTC+02:00 (EET)
  - Summer (DST): UTC+03:00 (EEST)
- Postal code: 107220
- Area code: +(40) 244
- Vehicle reg.: PH
- Website: primaria-dumbrava.ro

Dumbrava is a commune in Prahova County, Muntenia, Romania. It is composed of six villages: Ciupelnița, Cornu de Sus, Dumbrava, Trestienii de Jos, Trestienii de Sus, and Zănoaga.

The commune is situated in the Wallachian Plain, on the banks of the river Teleajen. It is located in the southern part of Prahova County, 20 km (12 mi) southeast of the county seat, Ploiești, and 61 km (38 mi) north of the national capital, Bucharest.

== Demographics ==
Historical population
Year	Pop.	±%
2002	4,466	—
2011	4,505	+0.9%
2021	4,342	−3.6%
Source: Census data

At the 2021 census, Dumbrava had a population of 4,342; of those, 76% were Romanians and 17% Roma.

== Pictures ==
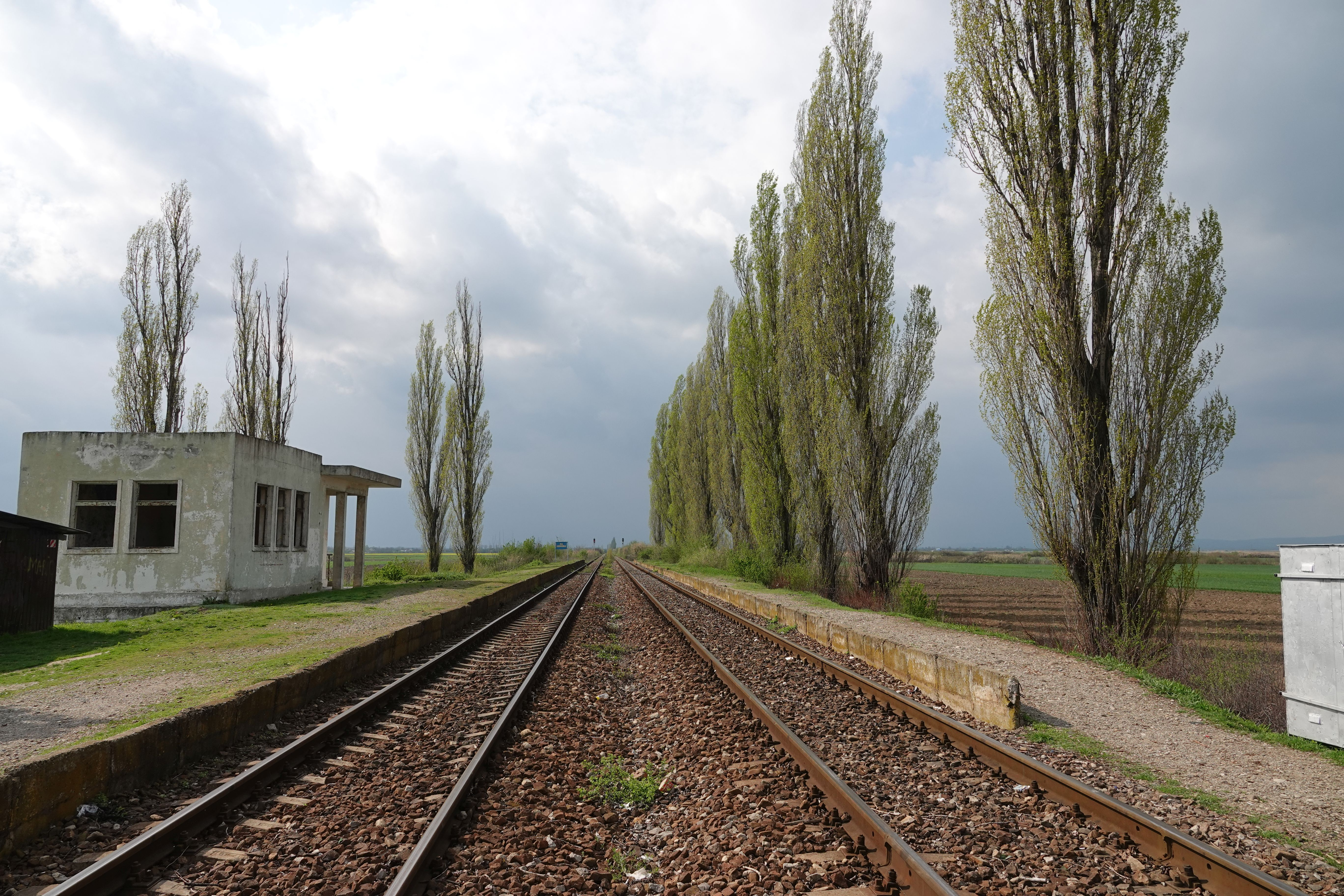
Cornurile railway stop

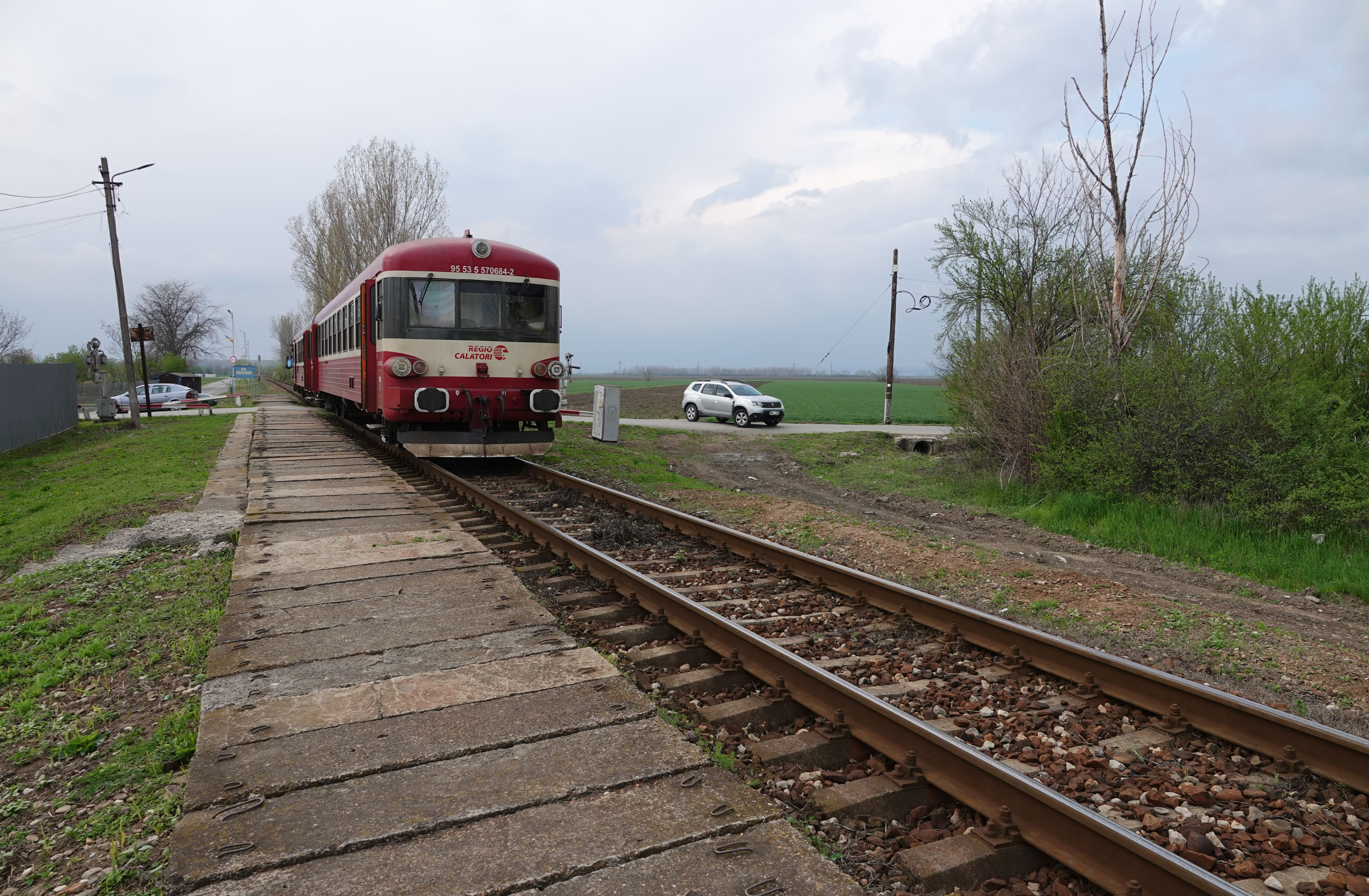
Trestieni railway stop
