= Edgar Pick =

Israeli immunologist

Edgar Pick (Hebrew: אדגר פיק) is an Israeli immunologist who is Professor Emeritus of Immunology in the Department of Clinical Microbiology and Immunology at the Faculty of Medical and Health Sciences at Tel Aviv University in Israel.

== Early life and education ==
Pick was born in 1938 in Lugoj, Romania. After receiving his baccalaureate at the Coriolan Brediceanu High School in Lugoj, he enrolled at the Victor Babeș University of Medicine and Pharmacy. He completed his medical studies at the Hebrew University Hadassah Medical School in Jerusalem, graduating with an M.D. in 1965. He was a postdoctoral fellow in experimental pathology at the Scripps Clinic and Research Foundation in La Jolla, California, from 1965 to 1967, where he trained with Joseph D. Feldman. In 1967 he joined the laboratory of John L.Turk, the world leader of cell-mediated immunity studies. He received a Ph.D. from the University of London in 1970. While in London, Pick focused on the study of soluble products made by antigen-stimulated T lymphocytes—known as lymphokines, and later as a form of cytokines—characterizing molecules known as "skin reactive factor" and "migration inhibitory factor". With Turk, he published one of the first reviews on lymphokines.

== Career and research ==
In October 1970, Pick was appointed Senior Lecturer of Immunology in the Department of Human Microbiology (now Clinical Microbiology and Immunology) at the Sackler Faculty of Medicine, Tel Aviv University, and rose to professorship in 1979. His research centered on the role of T cell-derived lymphokines in enhancing innate immunity by augmenting the capacity of phagocytes to produce reactive oxygen species (ROS) in response to pathogenic microorganisms. He co-edited the first book on lymphokines, and edited the 15 volumes of the series Lymphokines.

Pick is best known for his fundamental studies on the enzyme complex responsible for the generation of the primary ROS, superoxide, by phagocytes, known as the NADPH oxidase. With Yael Bromberg, he described a novel method of activating the NADPH oxidase derived from resting phagocytes by unsaturated fatty acids and anionic amphiphiles, known as the "cell-free system". This approach was a major paradigm shift, leading to the discovery that phagocytes contain, in addition to the membrane component directly responsible for superoxide production (known as gp91phox or Nox2), cytosolic components, responsible for the formation of the active NADPH oxidase complex. It also led to the identification of previously unknown causes for an inherited disease, characterized by the inability of phagocytes to produce ROS, known as Chronic Granulomatous Disease, resulting in repeated infections. Pick (with D. Sha'ag and T. Kroizman) also had a leading role in the identification and characterization of the "cytosolic components" of the NADPH oxidase, and is best known for the finding (with A. Abo and A.W. Segal) that the small GTPase Rac is an essential participant in the activation of the NADPH oxidase.

Pick's other major contribution (with G. Joseph and I. Dahan) was introducing "peptide walking" as a method to identify functionally important regions in individual NADPH oxidase components and as a path to the discovery of peptide-based drugs for the treatment of diseases caused by excessive generation of ROS.

Pick is also known for the pioneering design (with Y. Berdichevsky and A. Mizrahi) of the tripartite chimeras ("trimeras"), where functionally important segments of the NADPH oxidase activating cytosolic components are fused in a single molecule; and for studies (with E. Bechor and A. Zahavi) on the mechanism of interaction of p67phox with Nox2.

A description of Pick's contributions to NADPH oxidase research in a form accessible to the lay readership was recently published. Pick has edited the book "NADPH Oxidases Revisited: From Function to Structure", to which he has contributed the introductory chapter, which is a history of research on Nox2 and its cytosolic regulators.

Pick was the Incumbent of the Roberts-Guthman Chair in Immunopharmacology (1988–2008), Director of the J. F. Cohnheim – Minerva Center for Cellular and Molecular Phagocyte Research (1994–2008), Head of Sackler Institute of Molecular Medicine (1997–1998), and Head of Kodesz Institute of Host Defense against Infectious Diseases (1999–2008).

He is a lifetime member of the Society for Leukocyte Biology and a member of the Israel Immunological Society.

Pick was a member of the Editorial Boards of "International Archives of Allergy and Applied Immunology" (1974–1990), "Immunology" (1979–1986), "Cellular Immunology" (1984–1992), "Immunobiology" (1981–2003), "International Journal of Immunopharmacology" (1984–2000), "Journal of Leukocyte Biology" (1996–2001; Section Editor), and "FASEB Journal" (2006–2018). He was a member of the advisory board of "Antioxidants" (2020).

Pick's research has been supported by grants from institutions including the Israel Science Foundation, the National Institutes of Health, and The David Roberts Fund. He served as a speaker and discussion leader at several Gordon Research Conferences.

== Publications ==
Pick has published 113 peer-reviewed papers, 10 book chapters, and 19 papers published in conference proceedings. Pick has also edited several books, including the 15-volume Academic Press "Lymphokines" series and Springer's "NADPH Oxidases Revisited". In 2026, he published a scientific autobiography as a chapter in a book on NADPH oxidases that he edited.
