= Ioan Popovici =

Ioan Popovici may refer to:

- Ioan Popovici (brigadier general) (1865–1953), Romanian general
- Ioan Popovici (divisional general) (1857–?), Romanian general
- Ioan Popovici-Bănățeanul (1869–1893), Romanian poet
