= Filaret Barbu =

Romanian operetta composer

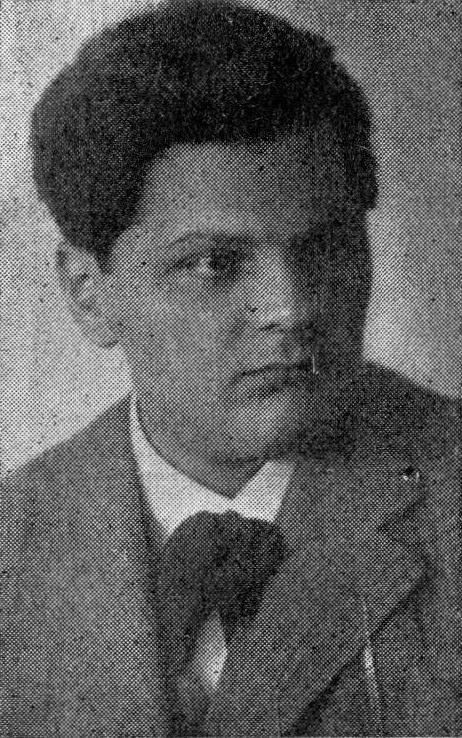
- Filaret Barbu in 1934.
- Born: Filaret Barbu; April 16, 1903; Lugoj, Romania
- Died: May 31, 1984 (aged 81); Timișoara, Romania
- Occupation: Composer
- Children: Gelu Barbu (son)

Filaret Barbu (April 16, 1903 – May 31, 1984) was a Romanian operetta composer.

== Life ==
Filaret Barbu was the son of Iosif Hazi Barbu, a pork butcher, and Ema Barbu (née Dragoș). During his childhood he often heard traditional Romanian lăutari and taraf bands in his grandfather's inn. He went to school in Lugoj and Caransebeș. He studied the violin and the counterpoint at the New Vienna Conservatory during 1922—1926.

Back in Romania, he became a music teacher at "Coriolan Brediceanu" High School in Lugoj and the conductor of "Ion Vidu" choir, which he founded in 1922. In 1931, after the death of Ion Vidu, he became the leader of the local choir "Reuniunea română de muzică și cântări". His debut work was the 1924 vaudeville Privighetoarea albă (The White Nightingale). He also wrote a monographic study dedicated to tenor Traian Grozăvescu and a collection of choir songs titled Portativ bănățean (The Banat Staff).

He died in 1984 in Timișoara. He was the father of ballet dancer and choreographer Gelu Barbu.
