= Gelu Barbu =

Romanian-born Spanish ballet dancer and choreographer

- Born: Gelu Barbu; 14 April 1932; Lugoj, Romania
- Died: 17 February 2016 (aged 83); Las Palmas, Spain
- Occupations: Ballet dancer; choreographer
- Parent: Filaret Barbu (father)

Gelu Barbu (Romanian pronunciation: [ˈd͡ʒelu ˈbarbu]; 14 April 1932 – 17 February 2016) was a Romanian-born Spanish ballet dancer and choreographer.

== Life ==
Barbu was born in Lugoj, the son of composer Filaret Barbu. He received his basic training at the ballet school of the Romanian National Opera in Bucharest, where he was taught by Anton Romanovski and Floria Capsali.
