= Danube–Criș–Mureș–Tisa Euroregion =

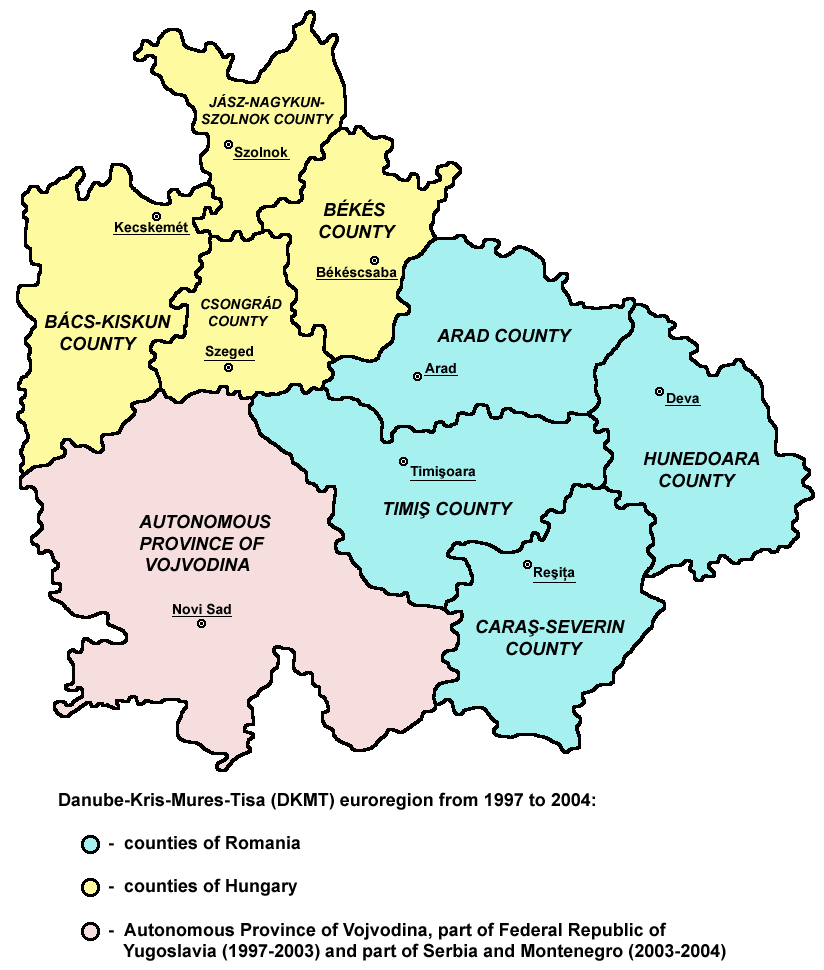
Map of DKMT (1997–2004).

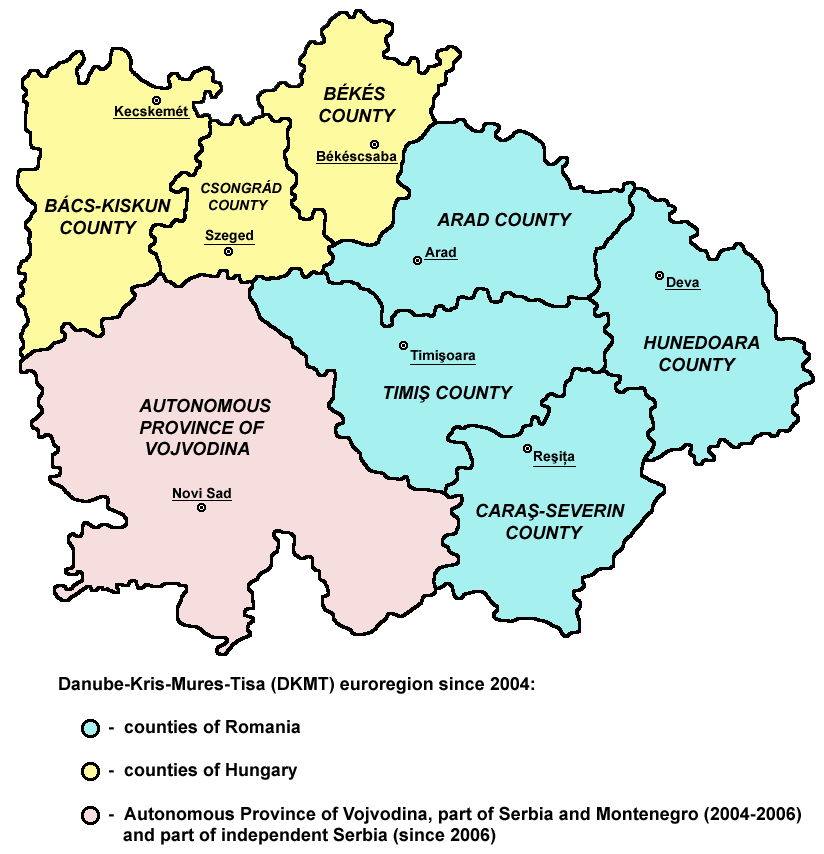
Map of DKMT (2004-2007).

The Danube–Criș–Mureș–Tisa Euroregion (DMKT; Romanian: Dunăre–Criș–Mureș–Tisa; Hungarian: Duna–Körös–Maros–Tisza; Serbian: Dunav–Kriš–Moriš–Tisa or Дунав–Криш–Мориш–Тиса) is a euroregion located in Hungary, Romania, and Serbia. It is named after four rivers: Danube, Criș, Mureș, and Tisa.

== Member regions ==
Originally established in 1997, the Danube–Criș–Mureș–Tisa euroregion consists of 8 member regions (formerly 9):

- Arad County, in Romania
- Bács-Kiskun County, in Hungary
- Békés County, in Hungary
- Caraș-Severin County, in Romania
- Csongrád-Csanád County, in Hungary
- Hunedoara County, in Romania
- Timiș County, in Romania
- Vojvodina, in Serbia

In 2004, the Jász-Nagykun-Szolnok County of Hungary abandoned membership in this regional cooperation; thus, since 2004, the DKMT euroregion is composed of only 8 member regions.

== Largest cities in DKMT ==
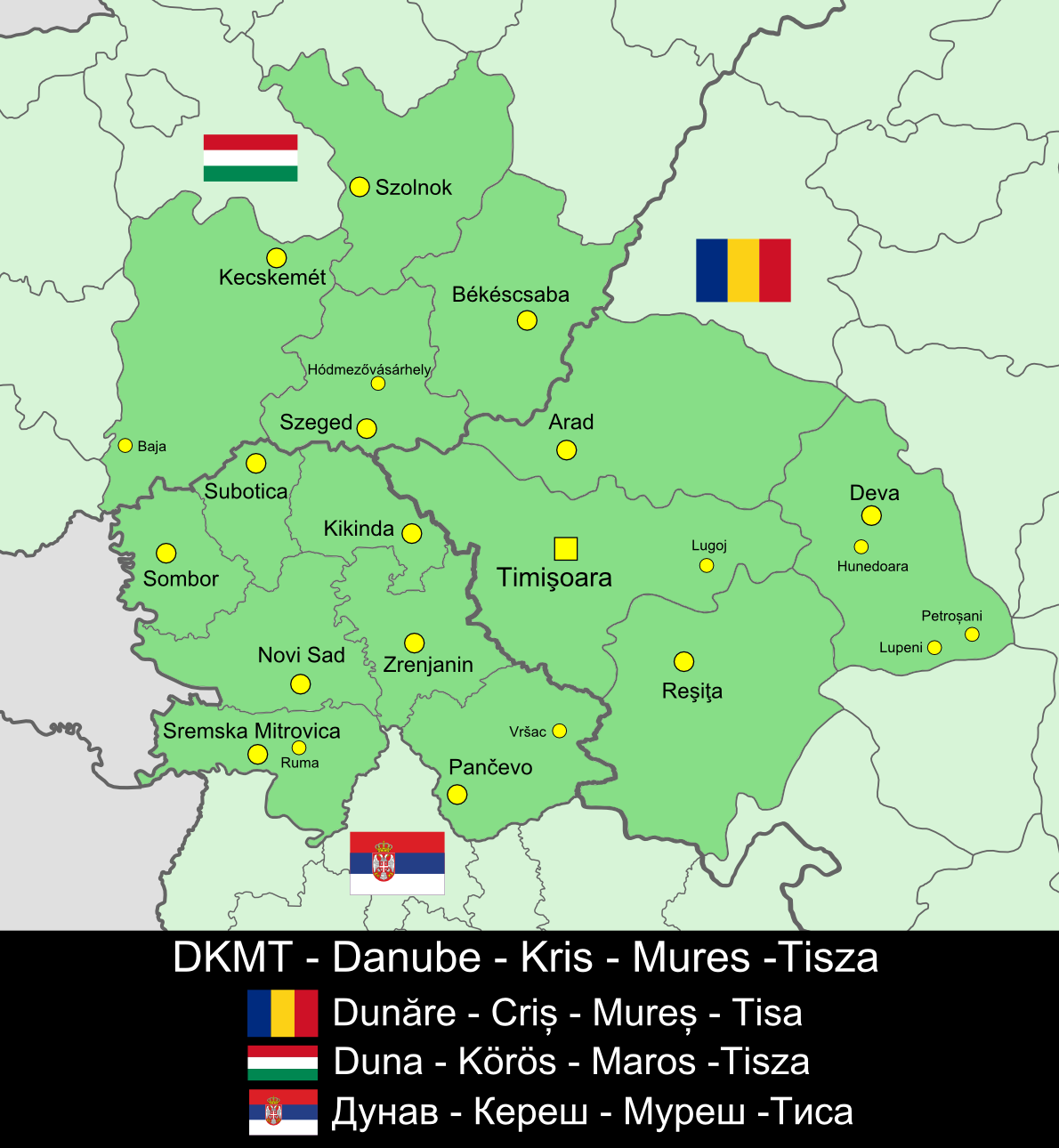
Map of largest cities in the DKMT Euroregion (within pre-2004 borders).

List of largest cities in DKMT (with population figures):

Country flag / City	Population	Metro
(Serbia) Novi Sad	325,511	372,136
(Romania) Timișoara	319,279	359,443
(Hungary) Szeged	168,048	
(Romania) Arad	159,704	
(Hungary) Kecskemét	111,411	
(Serbia) Subotica	88,752	
(Serbia) Pančevo	73,401	
(Romania) Reșița	73,282	
(Hungary) Szolnok^{a}	72,953	
(Serbia) Zrenjanin	67,129	
(Hungary) Békéscsaba	62,050	
(Romania) Deva	61,123	
(Romania) Hunedoara	60,525	
(Serbia) Sombor	47,623	
(Hungary) Hódmezővásárhely	47,019	
(Serbia) Kikinda	38,065	
(Serbia) Sremska Mitrovica	37,751	
(Romania) Lugoj	37,321	
(Hungary) Baja	36 267	
(Serbia) Vršac	35,701	
(Romania) Petroșani	34,331	
(Serbia) Ruma	30,076	

^{a} Szolnok has not been part of the DKMT euroregion since 2004.

== Gallery ==
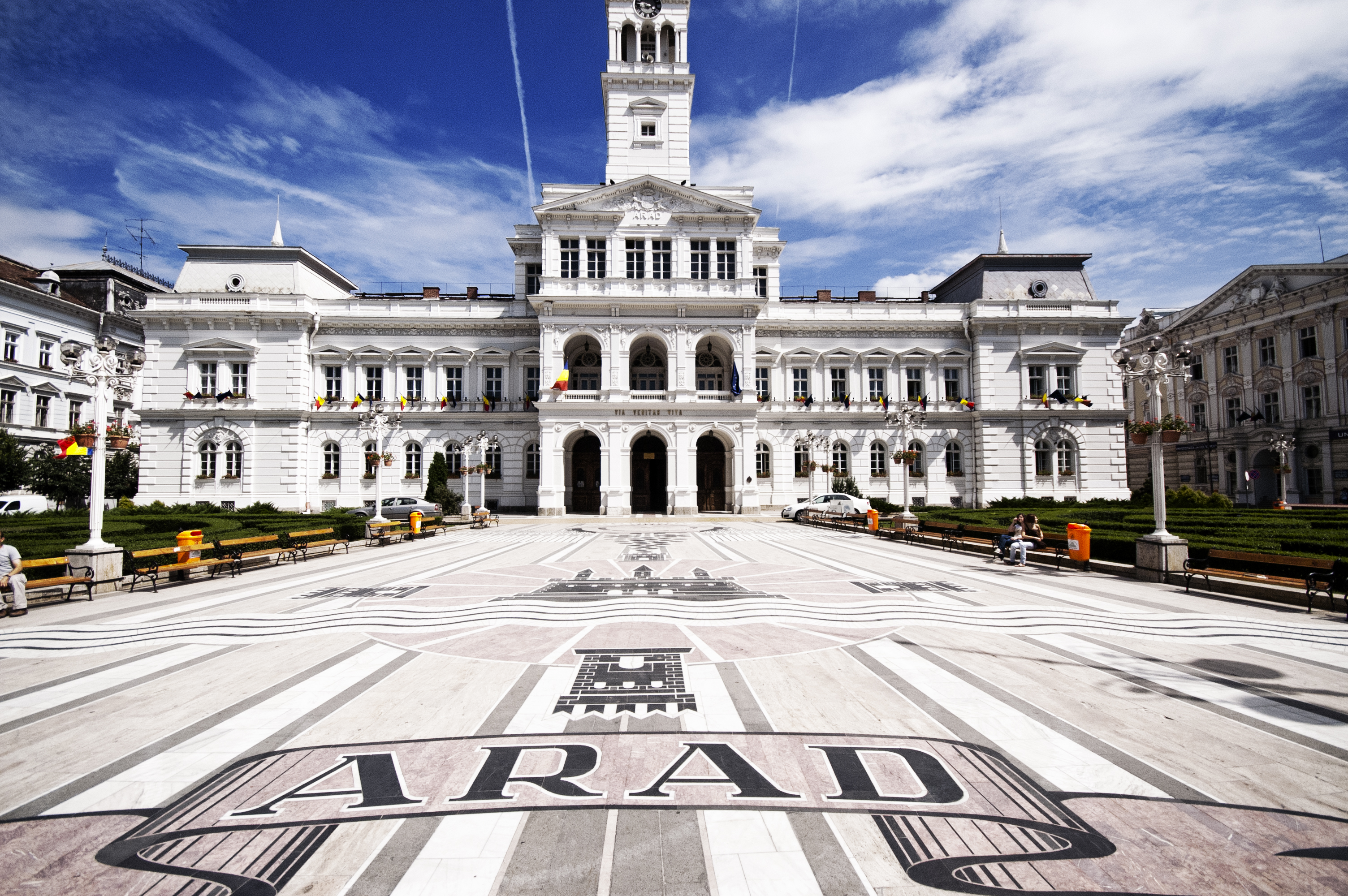
Arad

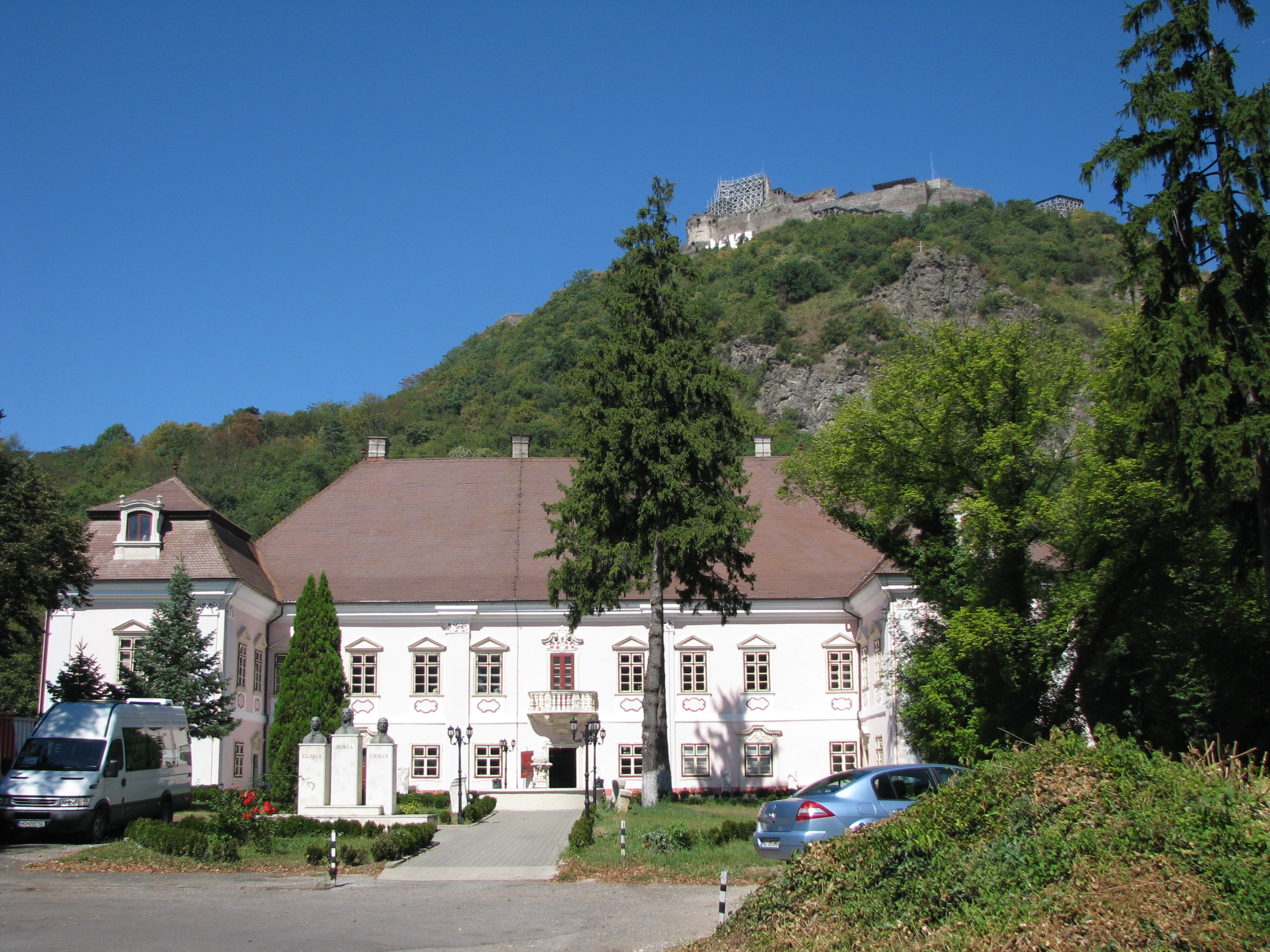
Deva

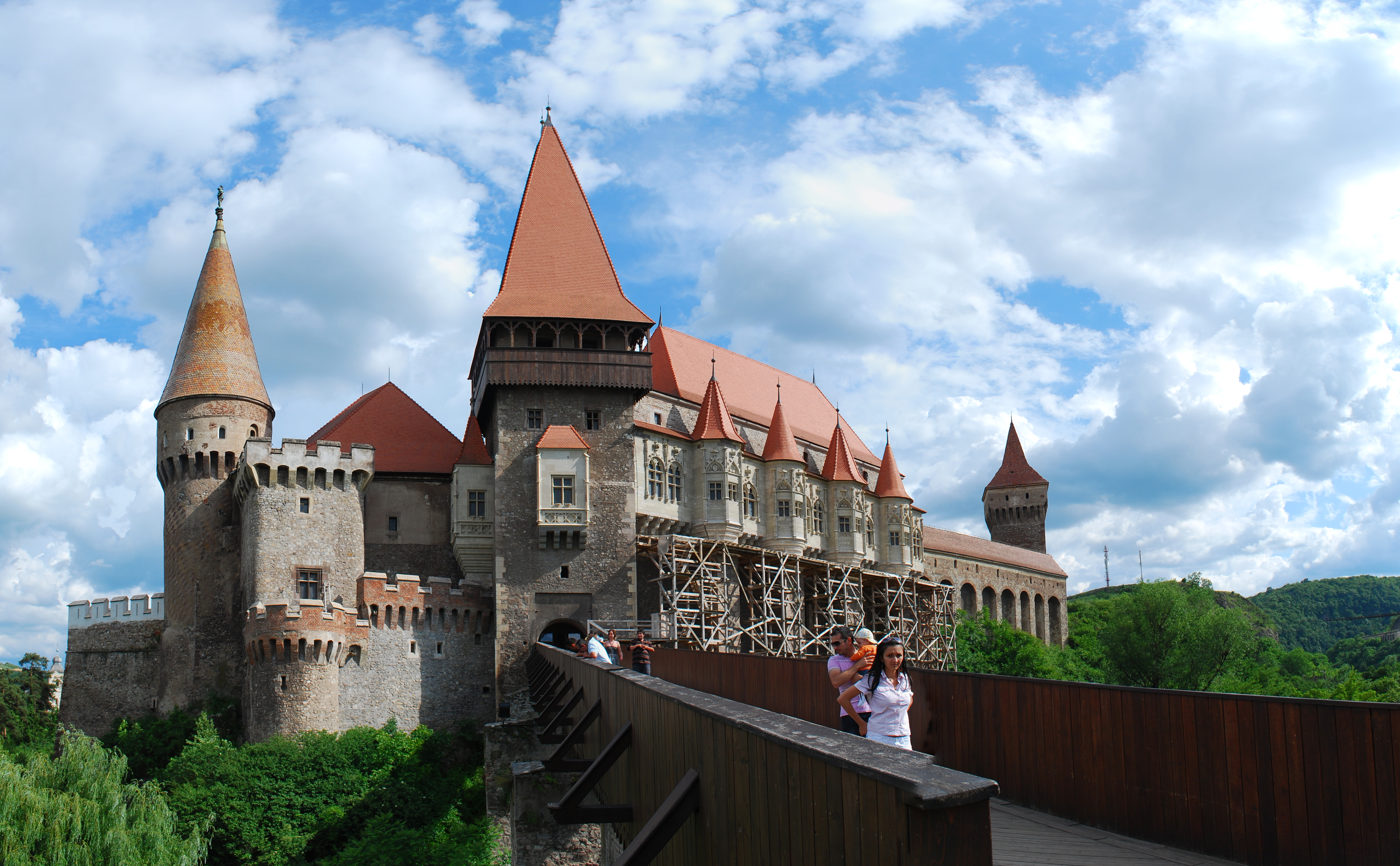
Hunedoara

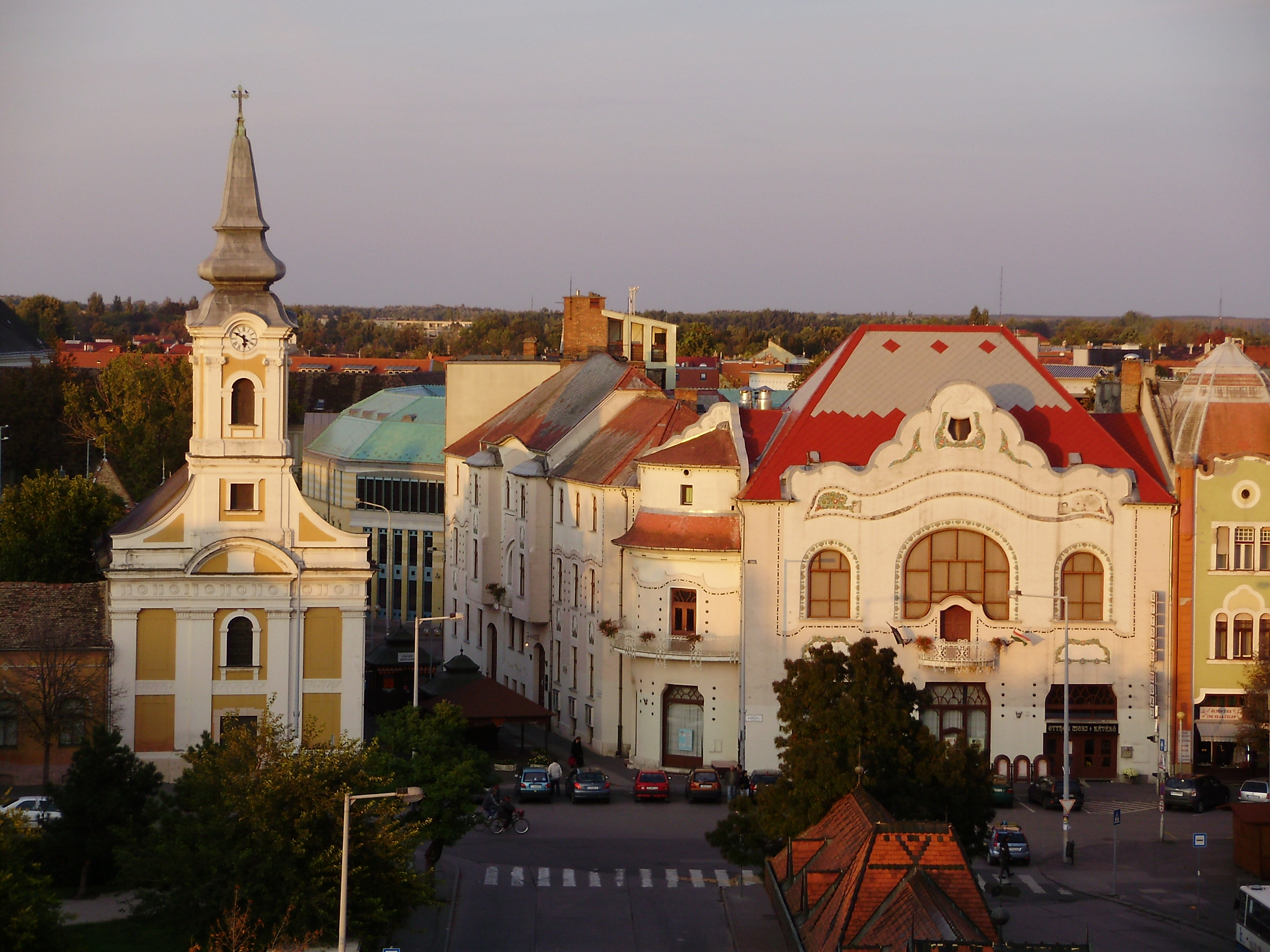
Kecskemét

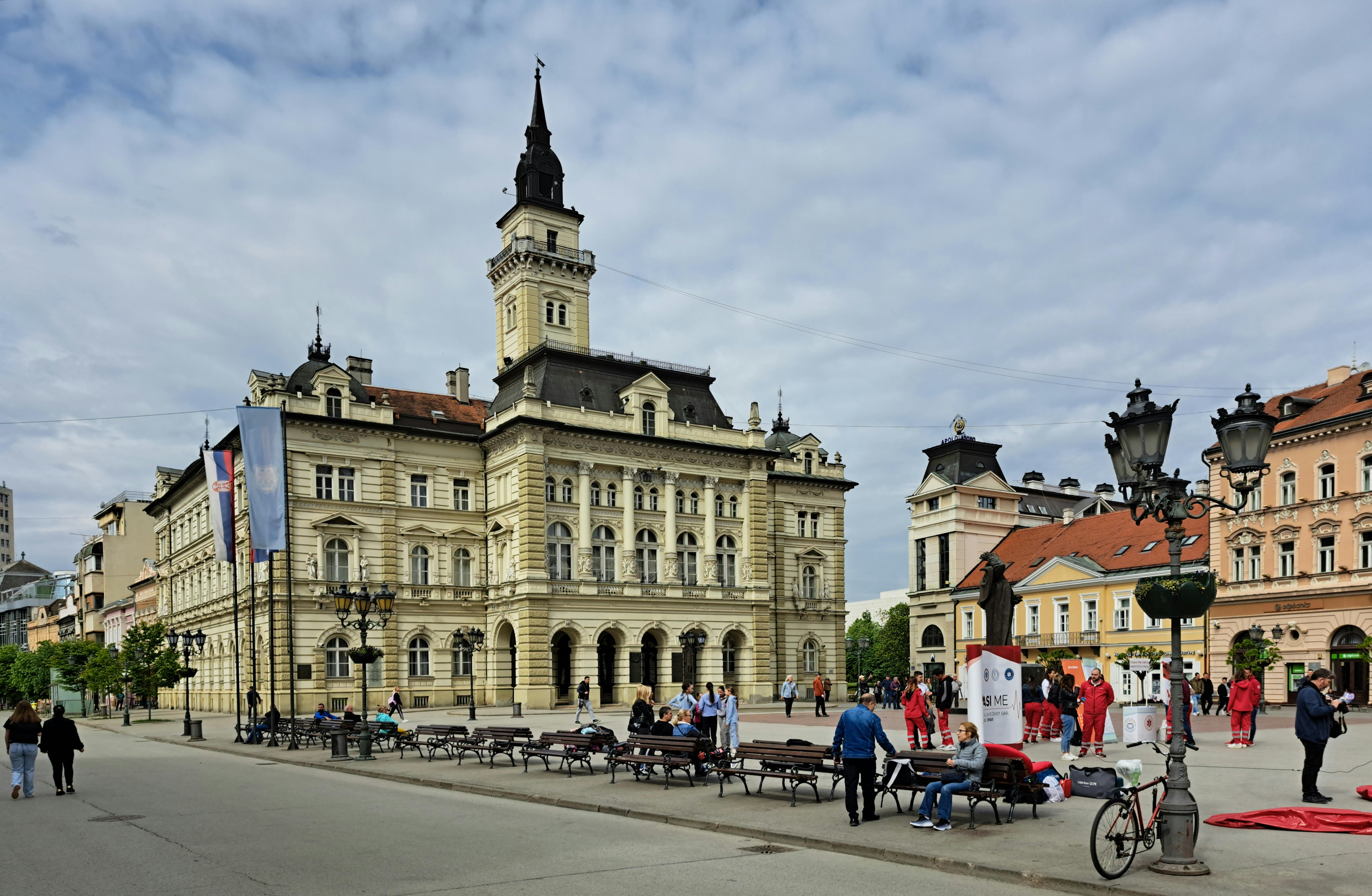
Novi Sad

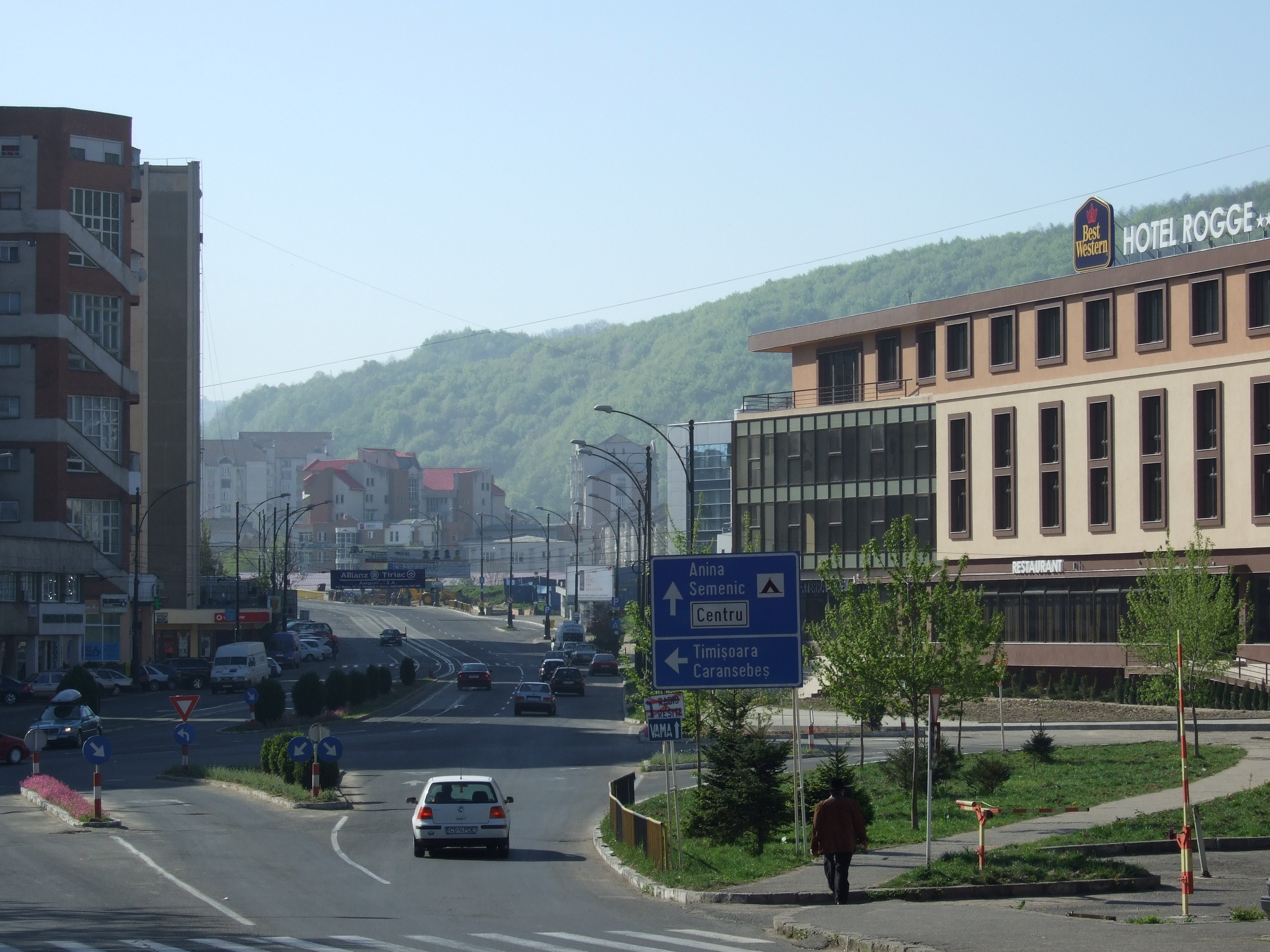
Reșița

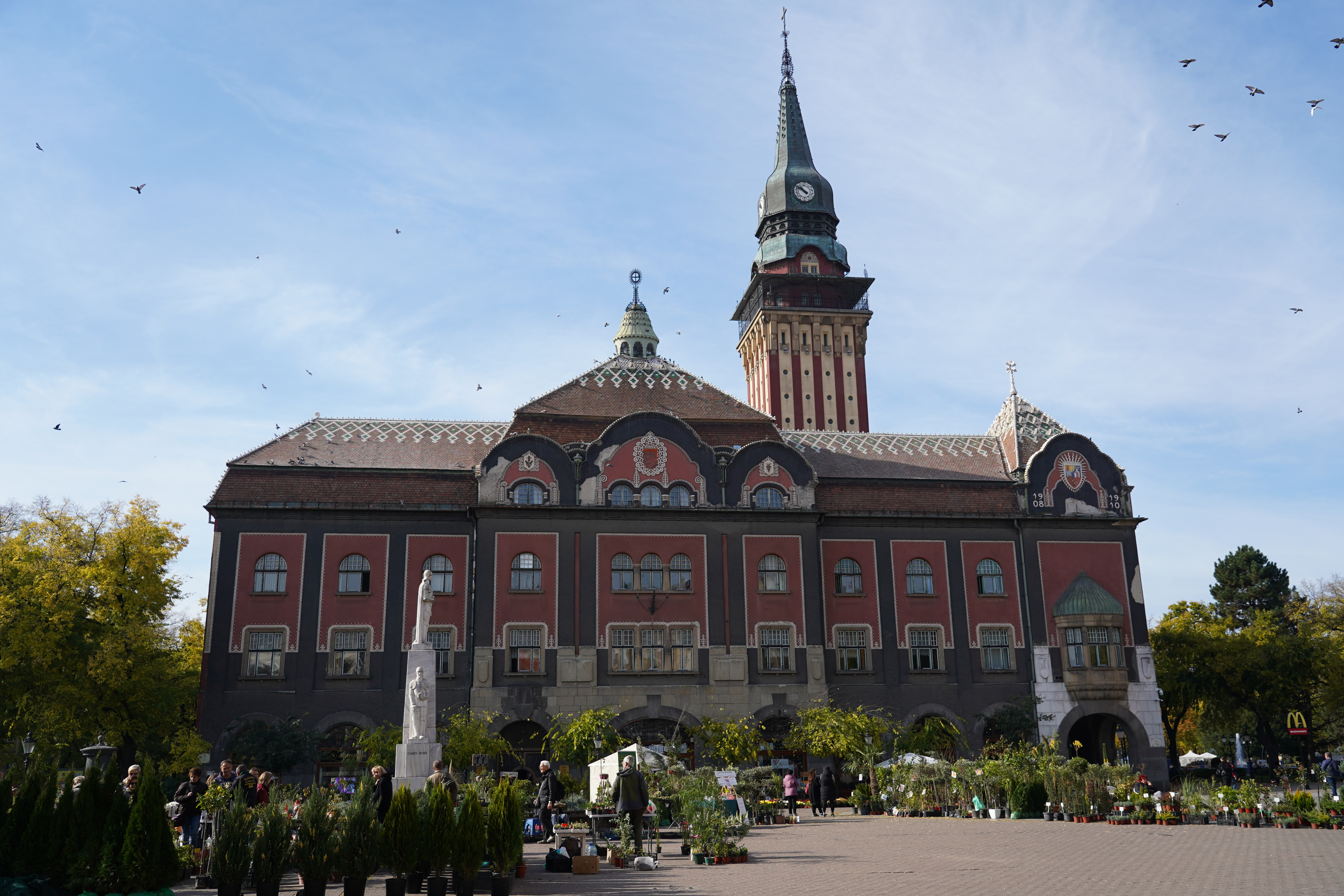
Subotica

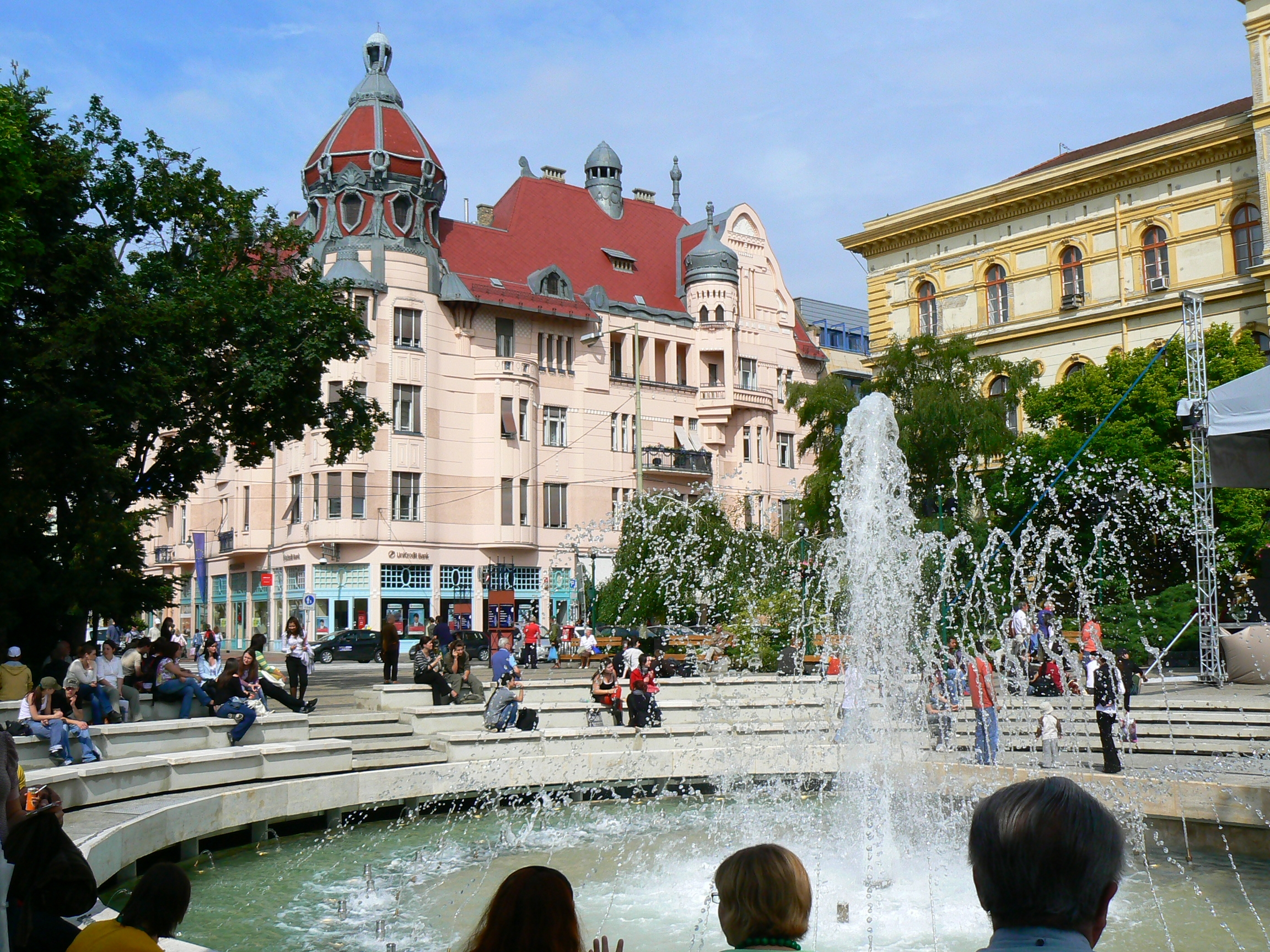
Szeged

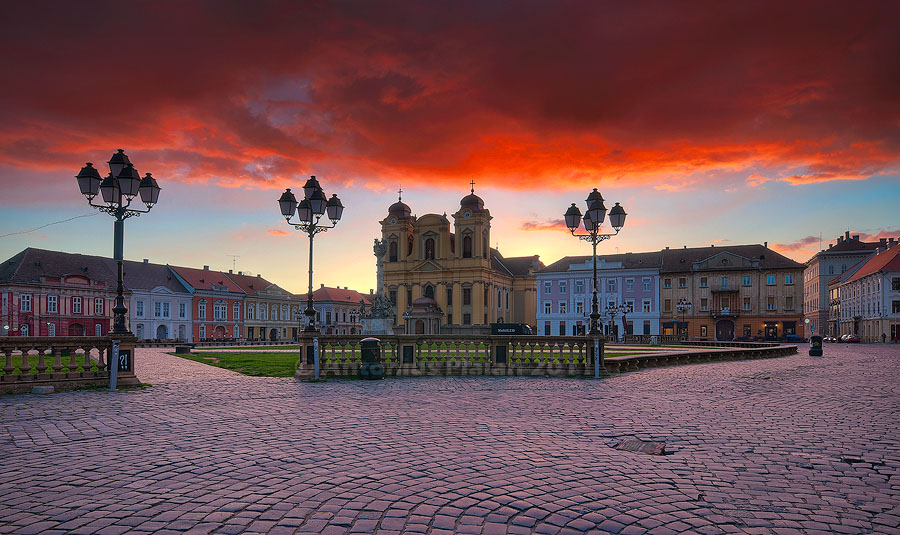
Timișoara

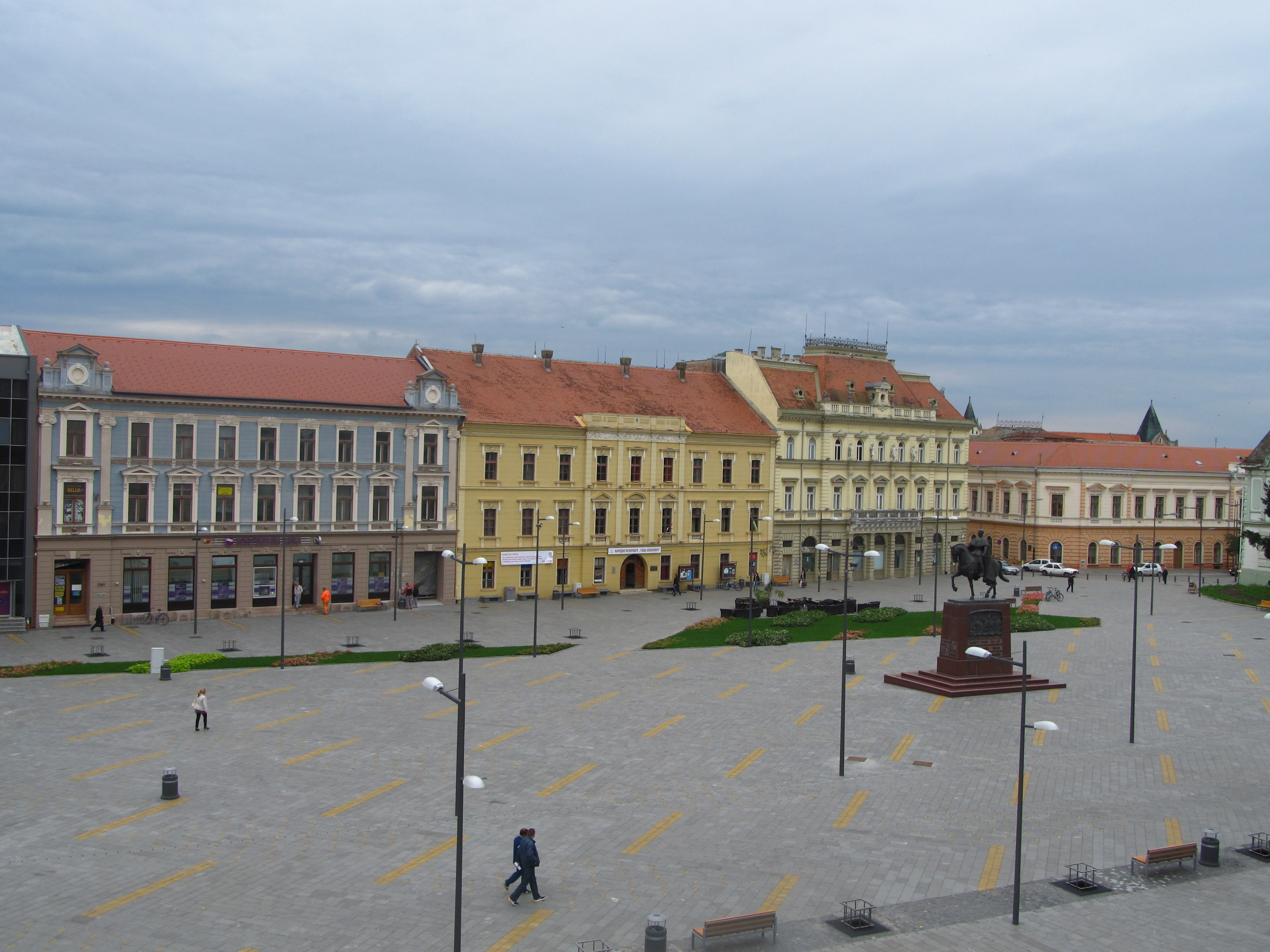
Zrenjanin

== See also ==
- List of euroregions
