= Victor Neumann =

Romanian historian, political analyst and professor

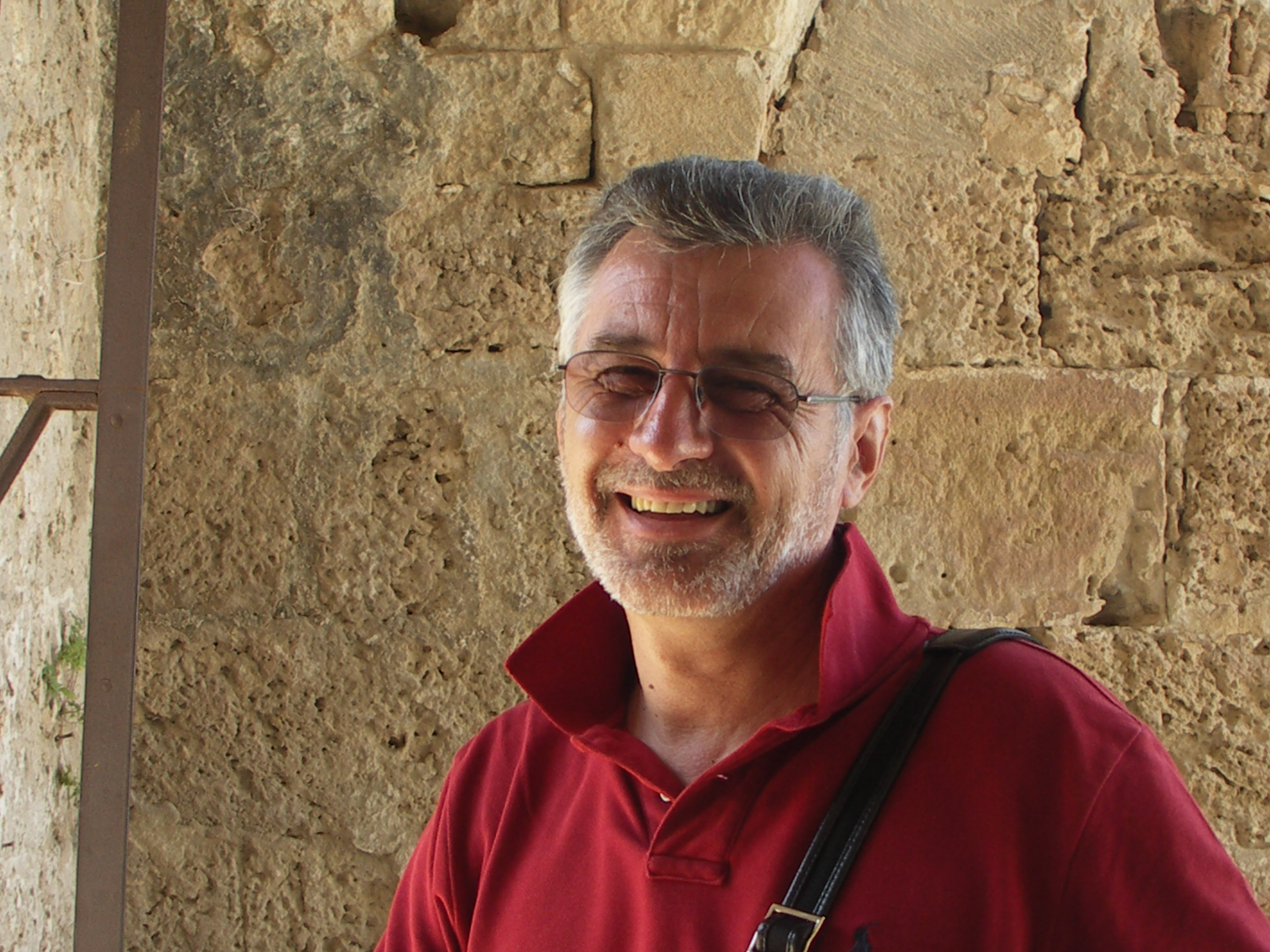
Victor Neumann

Victor Neumann is a Romanian historian, political analyst, and professor at the West University in Timișoara, focusing on the recent cultural and intellectual histories of Eastern and Central Europe (focusing his research on interculturality and multiculturality). Much of his work deals with Conceptual History, history of political thought and theory of history. As of October 2013, he is Director of the Timișoara Art Museum.

== Biography ==
Born in Lugoj, Victor Neumann graduated from the University of Cluj-Napoca in 1976, and earned his PhD in history from the University of Bucharest in 1992. He was a visiting professor at the Université d'Angers (1999), Emory University in Atlanta, and Georgia State University in Athens, Georgia (1999), the National Foreign Affairs Training Center from Washington, D.C. (2001), and the University of Vienna (2003–2004). He received NATO Scholarship (1995-1997) and he was Fulbright Senior Scholar (September 2000 - September 2001) affiliated with The Catholic University of America and with the Center for Advanced Holocaust Studies within the Holocaust Memorial Museum, Washington, D.C.

Neumann was also head of research at the École Pratique des Hautes Études in Paris, and a lecturer at several higher learning institutions (the Woodrow Wilson International Center for Scholars, Columbia University, the London School of Slavonic and East European Studies, and the University of Udine).
