= Lugoj =

Municipality in Romania

- Municipality
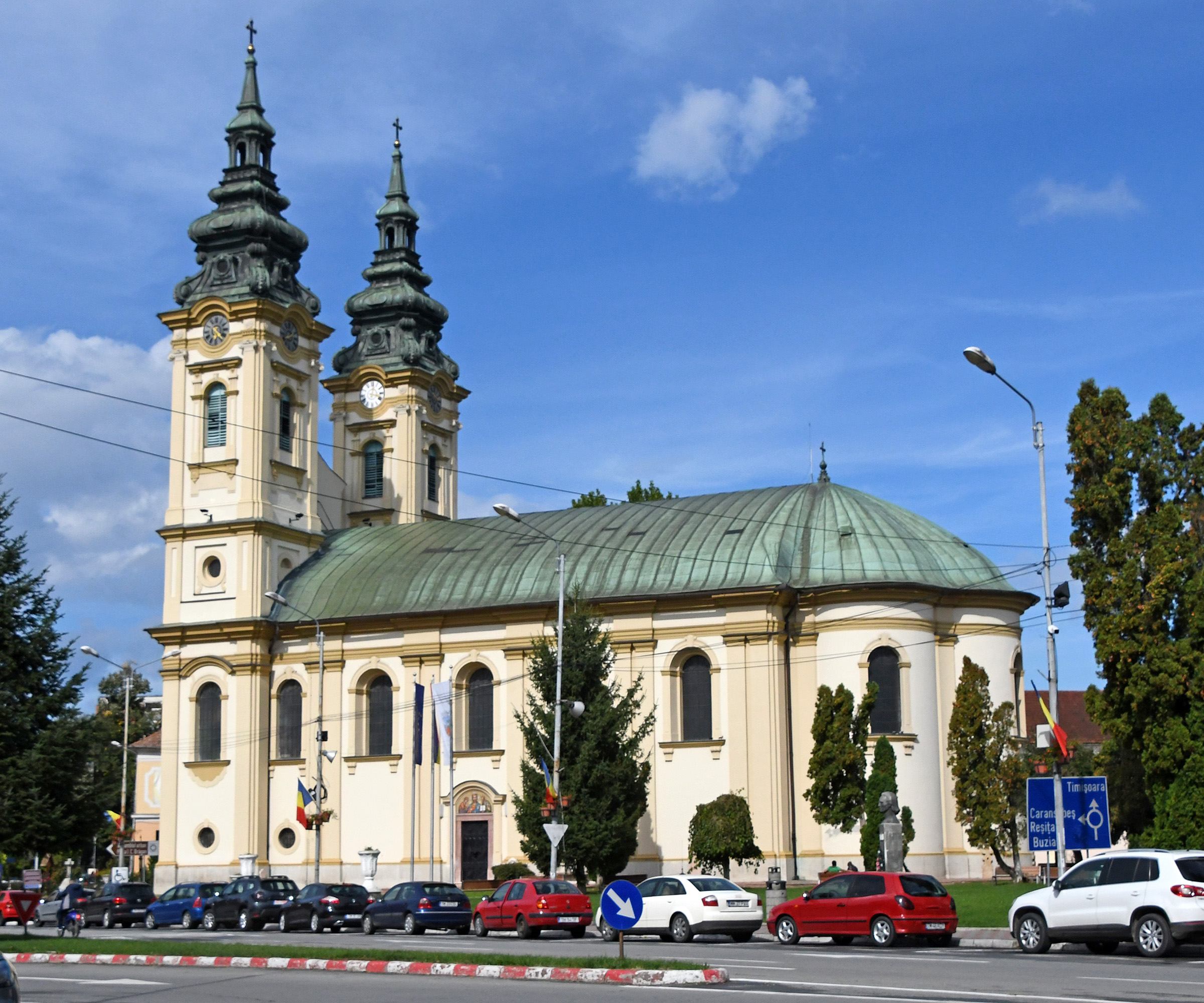
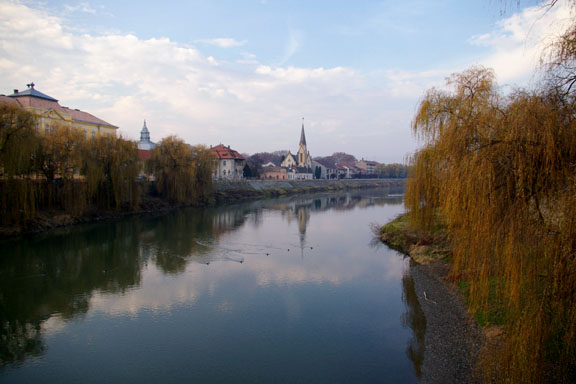
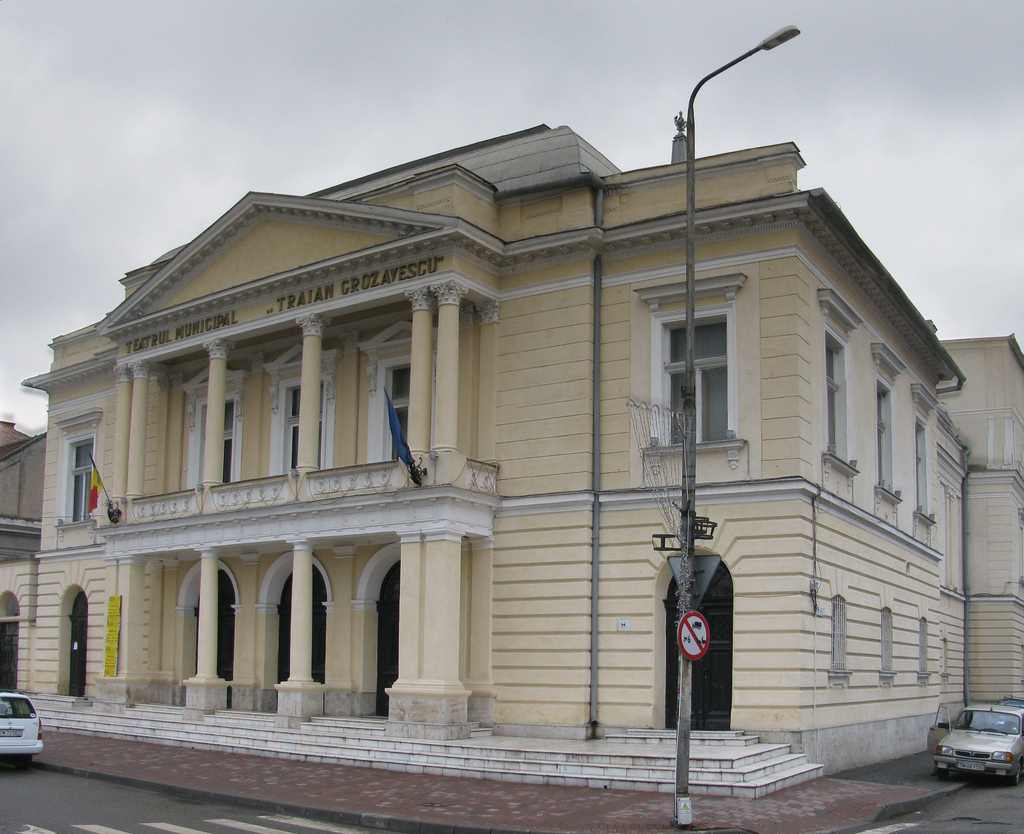
- The Orthodox Dormition Church in central Lugoj Timiș River in Lugoj Traian Grozăvescu Theater

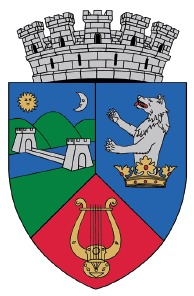
- Coat of arms

- Location in Timiș County

- Location in Romania
- Coordinates: 45°42′20″N 21°55′33″E
- Country: Romania
- County: Timiș

Government
  - Mayor (2024–2028): Călin-Ionel Dobra (PSD)
- Area: 98.03 km^{2} (37.85 sq mi)
- Elevation: 124 m (407 ft)
- Population (2021-12-01): 35,450
  - Density: 361.6/km^{2} (936.6/sq mi)
- Time zone: UTC+02:00 (EET)
  - Summer (DST): UTC+03:00 (EEST)
- Postal code: 305500–305502
- Area code: (+40) 02 56
- Vehicle reg.: TM
- Website: primarialugoj.ro

Lugoj (Romanian pronunciation: [ˈluɡoʒ]; Hungarian: Lugos; German: Lugosch; Slovak: Lugoš; Serbian: Лугош, romanized: Lugoš; Turkish: Logoş) is a city in Timiș County, Romania. The Timiș River divides the city into two halves: the "Romanian Lugoj" that spreads on the right bank, and the "German Lugoj" on the left bank. The city administers two villages, Măguri and Tapia.

== Etymology ==
The origin of the toponym Lugoj has generated a series of controversies over time. Vasile Maniu claims that it derives from the Latin word "lucus" (grove, small forest). Iorgu Iordan, in his Romanian Toponymy, accepts the origin of the name from the Slavic prefix "lug-" or "luh-" (swamp forest) and the Hungarian suffix "-os". However, linguist Simion Dănilă claims that the name of the city has its origin in the word "logos," a Banat doublet for "rogoz" (sedge, a hydrophilous plant). All these hypotheses refer to the swampy areas that once surrounded the city.

== Geography ==
Lugoj is located in southwestern Romania, in central-eastern Timiș County, in the historical region of Banat. It consists of the town of Lugoj and the villages of Măguri and Tapia. According to the National Territorial Planning Scheme, Lugoj is a second-tier locality – a municipality of county and zonal importance at county level, secondary pole at county level, with a balancing role in the network of localities. It is the second largest and most important city in Timiș County, being part of the Western Development Region and the Danube–Criș–Mureș–Tisa Euroregion. Lugoj covers an area of 98.03 km^{2}, of which 20.35 km^{2} in the build-up area and 77.68 km^{2} outside the build-up area. It borders Boldur to the west, Darova to the southwest, Victor Vlad Delamarina to the south, Gavojdia to the southeast, Criciova and Bârna to the east and Coșteiu to the north-northwest.

=== Relief ===
The territory of Lugoj belongs to the high plain of Lugoj and the hills of Lugoj. Located in the contact area of these units, the city developed on the lower terrace of the Timiș River, on both its banks. The relief unit in which Lugoj is located is the Lugoj Plain, which penetrates deep into the piedmont hills. The average altitude of the area is 124 m (407 ft).

Most of the land on which the city is located has a flat relief, with a few elevations that do not exceed 2–3 metres above the surface of the terrace. In the northwest of the plain there are the Lugoj Hills, which make the transition to the Poiana Ruscă Mountains. South of the Timiș riverbed, the territory of Lugoj extends to the floodplain of Cernabora, the nearest local tributary of Timiș.

=== Hydrography ===
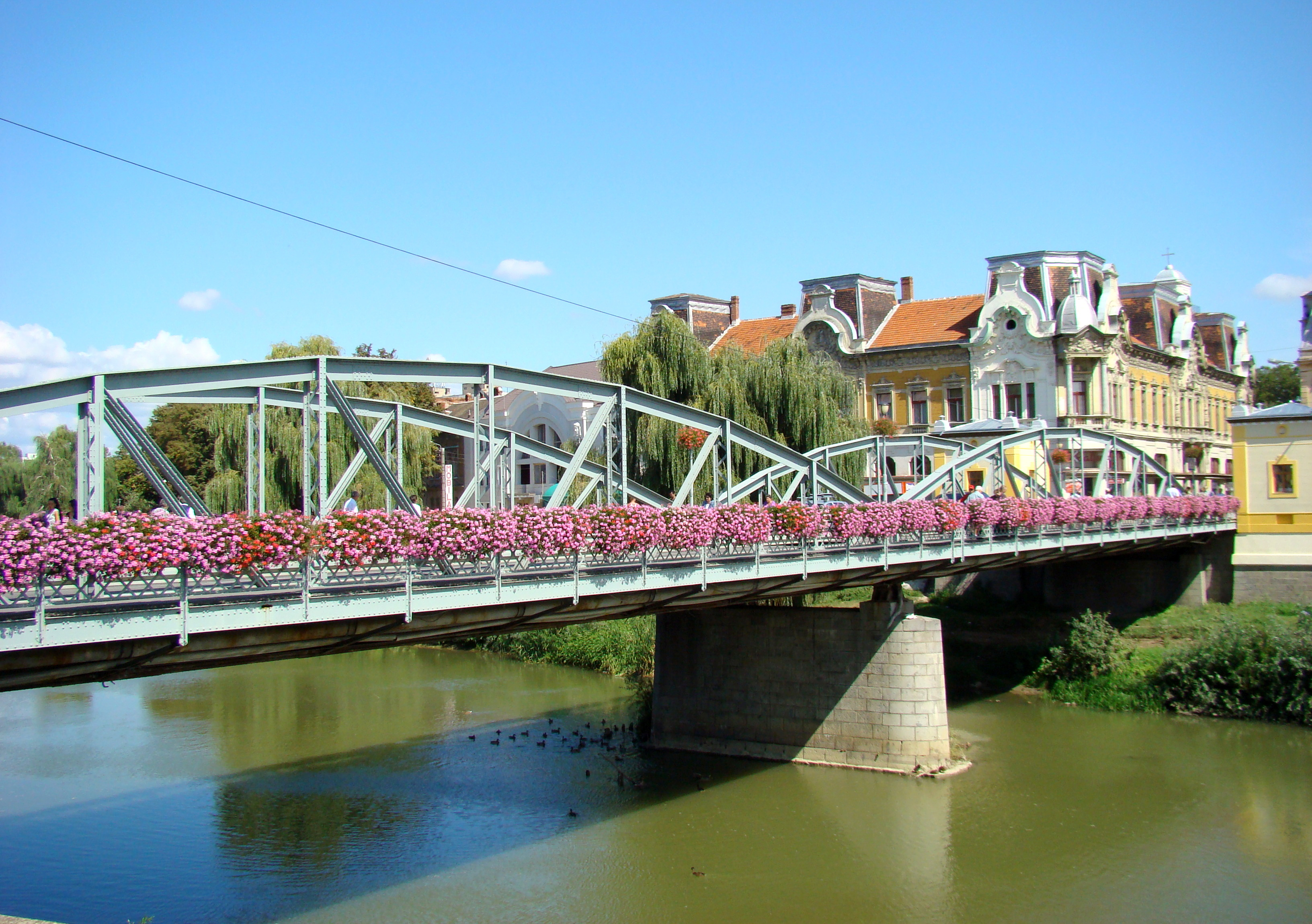
Timiș River and the Iron Bridge

The hills of Lugoj have a radial hydrographic network that comes from the mountainous area and goes to the main collectors: Bega (in the north) and Timiș (in the southwest). Overall, the valleys have a consistent character and have naturally detached long peaks with the same radial orientation. The configuration of the relief north of Fârdea, in the confluence area of Miniș and Gladna, allowed the location here of the Surduc accumulation lake, which, with an area of over 320 ha, represents the largest lake area of Timiș County.

=== Climate ===
From a climatic point of view, the Lugoj area is part of the moderate temperate continental climate, with influences from the west and south of the continent, characterized by mild winters and cool summers. Sub-Mediterranean influences are felt by relatively small thermal amplitudes and the appearance of a second maximum in the precipitation regime (autumn).

Cyclonic air masses are very common here, which, coming from the Mediterranean and Adriatic regions, cause thawing and early melting of winter snow. The average annual temperature is 10.6 °C (51.1 °F).

=== Flora and fauna ===
Regarding the fauna and flora, among the protected fauna species that can be found in the area are European bee-eater (Merops apiaster) and sand martin (Riparia riparia), found mainly on the valley and meadow of the Timiș River. Among the protected trees can be found the 70-year-old specimen of Banat black pine (Pinus nigra ssp. banatica) in the Catholic cemetery.

== History ==
The beginnings of the settlement can be established since the Neolithic period, the archeological excavations made on the right bank of Timiș and in the Dealul Viilor area highlighting levels of living of a population of shepherds and farmers dating back to the 4th–3rd millennia BC. The later epochs are represented archeologically by the bronze deposit discovered in the Mondial area and vestiges from the Iron Age and the Daco-Roman period signaled both in the city center and in various localities in the vicinity.

Lugoj first appears in written history in 1334, when a papal tithe record mentions a certain priest Martin of Lucas. As an administrative formation, the district of Lugoj, which also included the surrounding villages, dates from 1369, when it is mentioned as posesio Lugas. Later, in 1376, a document issued by King Sigismund of Luxembourg mentions the attribution of the fortress of Lugoj (castrum Lugas) to the count of Temes, and soon, in 1379, it appears in documents as a castle town, with Nicholas II Garai as chatelain. Gradually, Lugoj becomes an important strategic and communication point in the medieval Banat area, due to its geographical position, in the contact area of the Tisa Plain with the Poiana Ruscă Mountains, at the intersection of the roads between Banat, Transylvania and the southwest of Wallachia, ensuring access to the Danube. In 1390 Lugoj is attested as the seat of a Romanian district.

The 15th century found Lugoj under the authority of the count of Temes, but the settlement enjoyed a wide autonomy. The management of the town was entrusted to a knyaz, assisted by 12 jurors, the inhabitants having in addition to feudal obligations also military duties. Visiting Lugoj when he was count of Temes, John Hunyadi ordered the restoration and strengthening of the fortress on the right bank of Timiș, by building ramparts and palisades.

The merits of the Lugoj District in the battles with the Turks are recognized on 29 August 1457, by a diploma of privileges granted by King Ladislaus the Posthumous. A special moment during this period is the participation of the people of Lugoj, under the captainship of Count Pál Kinizsi, in the battle of Breadfield in 1479.

After the establishment of the Temeşvar Eyalet, the eastern part of Banat was organized in a separate administrative unit, Banate of Lugos and Karánsebes, dependent on the prince of Transylvania. The distinctive role of the town is confirmed on 7 May 1551, by Queen Isabella Jagiellon, who strengthens the old privileges by granting Lugoj the status of civitas regionalis, as well as heraldic signs – a wolf standing above the crown. The Banat of Lugos and Karánsebes resisted the Turkish pressures until 1658 when Ákos Barcsay, prince of Transylvania, asked the people of Lugoj and Caransebeș to accept the decision of the Diet of Sighișoara, subduing to the Turks. They soon occupied the town, bringing in a military garrison led by an agha.

The end of the 17th century finds Lugoj involved in the battles for supremacy between the Habsburgs and the Ottomans, the inhabitants supporting on 25 September 1695 the resistance of General Frederico Veterani, fortified in the swampy area southeast of the town. The battle ended with the defeat of Austrian troops by the Ottoman army led by the sultan himself, General Veterani being killed on the battlefield. The Treaty of Karlowitz, concluded in 1699 between the imperialists and the Ottomans, saw the fortress of Lugoj demolished; today, only a street called Cetatea Veche (Old Fortress) reminds of the former fortress. The plan of the fortress, made at the end of the 17th century by architect Luigi Ferdinando Marsigli, was also preserved, and the works for the construction of the University of Lugoj building revealed traces of fortifications, initially located between two arms of the Timiș. In 1661, Turkish traveler Evliya Çelebi described the fortress as a "square-shaped building, built of stone, fortified with palisades and surrounded by the Zeppel stream, with a gate to the east and a bridge that can be raised". The Turkish domination, for over 150 years in Banat, has left few traces on Lugoj, as well as on other towns on the edge of the Empire, which being subjected to a more tolerant regime, feel strongly the influences and temptations of the West, as a result of policies promoted by Habsburgs.

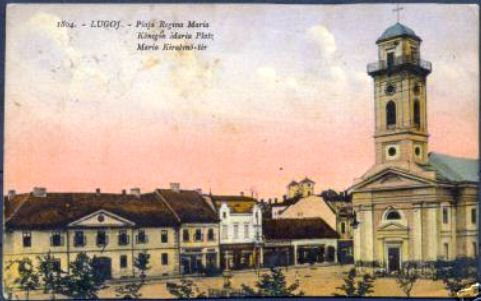
Queen Marie Square (present-day Iosif Constantin Drăgan Square) in 1804

By the Treaty of Passarowitz of 1718, Banat came under Austrian rule, being declared a crown land, under the name of Banat of Temeswar, administered by the imperial court through General Claude Florimond de Mercy. In 1778, Austria ceded Banat to Hungary, and Lugoj became the seat of Krassó County. After the revolution of 1848, for a short time, it was returned to the possession of Austria, so that through the Austro-Hungarian Compromise of 1867 it was returned to Hungary, integrating into the dualist empire thus created. Starting with 1881, Lugoj became the capital of the new Krassó-Szörény County, created by merging the Krassó and Szörény counties, and in 1889 it was declared a municipality. The new statute brought a series of defining changes in the ethnic and religious structure and in the economic and cultural evolution of the whole area. Hungarian reformism made possible access to modernity in the fields of institutions, legislation and education system, imposing emancipation from the servitudes of the medieval mentality, the penetration of new European ideas and thus the shaping of social categories capable of receiving them.

=== German colonization ===
In 1725 the first settlers from Austria, Bohemia, Bavaria and Silesia were brought to Lugoj, dealing mainly with blacksmithing, carpentry and masonry. They were settled to the left of Timiș, in a strictly delimited area, where they built their houses, laying the foundations of "German Lugoj" (German: Deutsch-Lugosch). The two localities on the banks of Timiș were the property of the Chamber, but each had its own administration. According to the 1786 conscription, "Romanian Lugoj" had 1,039 houses and 5,130 inhabitants, while "German Lugoj" had 203 houses and 1,446 inhabitants. In 1795, as a result of a decision of the Chamber, the two localities were unified, the leaders being elected alternately between Romanians and Germans.

=== Jewish history ===
Jews first settled in the town in the early 18th century, working in manufacturing and in running the transport system. They eventually adhered to the Neolog movement; a Jewish school was founded in 1883. Many Jews left at the end of World War I and the beginning of Romanian rule. Zionist activity began in 1919. In 1930, there were 1,418 Jews, accounting for 6% of the population.

During World War II, the Ion Antonescu regime economically sanctioned the Jews, sending male members of the community to forced labor camps near the Olt River and to the Brașov area. Four youths aged 14–15, charged with illegal communist activity, were sent to the Transnistria Governorate, where they died. Many Jews left after the war, mainly to Palestine.

== Demographics ==
Ethnic composition (2021)
1. Romanians (75.2%)
2. Hungarians (3.82%)
3. Roma (1.63%)
4. Germans (1.04%)
5. Unknown (17.0%)
6. Others (1.31%)
Religious composition (2021)
1. Orthodox (63.9%)
2. Roman Catholics (5.76%)
3. Pentecostals (4.77%)
4. Baptists (2.39%)
5. Reformed (2.34%)
6. Greek Catholics (1.04%)
7. Unknown (18.0%)
8. Others (0.98%)
9. Irreligious, atheists and agnostics (0.76%)

Lugoj had a population of 35,450 inhabitants at the 2021 census, down 12.17% from the 2011 census. Most inhabitants are Romanians (75.23%), larger minorities being represented by Hungarians (3.82%), Roma (1.63%) and Germans (1.04%). For 16.97% of the population, ethnicity is unknown. By religion, most inhabitants are Orthodox (63.93%), but there are also minorities of Roman Catholics (5.76%), Pentecostals (4.77%), Baptists (2.39%), Reformed (2.34%) and Greek Catholics (1.04%). For 18.03% of the population, religious affiliation is unknown.

Census		Ethnic composition
Year	Population	Romanians	Hungarians	Germans	Jews	Roma	Ukrainians	Serbs	Czechs	Slovaks
1880	12,389	5,987	1,475	4,696	–	–	2	69	–	32
1890	13,548	6,235	1,872	5,184	–	–	–	67	–	37
1900	17,486	6,632	3,976	6,274	–	–	3	153	–	77
1910	20,962	7,322	6,896	6,179	–	–	5	221	–	127
1920	21,172	8,723	4,257	5,995	1,774	–	–	–	–	–
1930	24,694	10,702	5,403	6,158	1,387	280	27	118		264
1941	27,871	14,395	4,729	6,037	–	–	–	–	–	–
1956	31,364	19,884	5,594	4,280	536	718	106	89	130	153
1966	36,728	24,989	6,004	4,540	250	301	199	106	76	145
1977	44,537	32,315	6,154	4,747	113	490	348	73	74	96
1992	50,939	40,665	5,442	2,658	55	1,097	737	101	32	108
2002	44,636	37,043	4,272	1,319	33	1,032	701	44	20	77
2011	40,361	31,885	2,752	748	26	928	520	34	7	37
2021	35,450	26,672	1,357	369	12	581	334	14	3	22

== Politics and administration ==
The city of Lugoj is administered by a mayor and a local council composed of 19 councilors. The mayor, Călin-Ionel Dobra, from the Social Democratic Party, has been in office since 2024. As from the 2024 local elections, the local council has the following composition by political parties:

Party	Seats	Composition
Social Democratic Party	7	
National Liberal Party	5	
Save Romania Union–People's Movement Party–Force of the Right	4	
Alliance for the Union of Romanians	2	
Ind.	1	

== Economy ==
At the end of the 18th century, Lugoj was recorded as an important viticultural center, with 90% of the population owning vineyards. During this period, the population was engaged in agriculture, viticulture, animal husbandry and crafts. An important moment in the history of Lugoj is the formation of guilds towards the end of the 18th century, marking the transition to the future industrial system. The first industrial activities present in Lugoj were: milling (Elisabeth Imperial Mill, 1722), cloth manufacturing, blanket manufacturing, silk processing and brewing.

At present, the main economic areas in Lugoj are represented by: manufacturing (57%), trade (23%), transport and storage (6%) and construction (5%). In the local economy, the largest contribution to turnover is made by the manufacturing industry, which generates more than 50% of turnover at municipal level and concentrates more than half of the local labor force. The best represented fields of activity locally are those of the manufacture of ceramic sanitary ware, the automotive industry and the manufacture of electrical equipment. Over the years, two industrial platforms have been individualized, Tapiei and Timișorii. Among the most important companies present here are: Honeywell (protection, alarm and control systems), Autoliv (car safety products), Schieffer (plastics, supplier to the automotive industry), Hella (electrical systems and electronic equipment for the automotive industry), Villeroy & Boch (sanitary items), Inter-Spitzen (fancywork), Schöller and Riva Intima (underwear), Rieker, Primos and Calzaturificio Torre (footwear), Agache (furniture), Werzalit (wood products), Gammet 2000 (metal fabrications for furniture), Lugomet and Silcom (metalworks).

== Culture ==
=== Music ===
Lugoj has always been one of the musical centers of Banat. Lugoj is also called "City of Music". Mozart, Haydn and Schubert's masses and other sacred music works were performed here while they were still alive. The Minorite Church was the culture bearer of the city. The oldest piano school in Banat also comes from Lugoj, founded in 1760 by a monk from the Minorite Church. The monks themselves dealt with church music, piano lessons and organ building. The Ion Vidu Municipal Choir has existed since 1810; in 1852 another choral society was founded under the direction of composer Conrad Paul Wusching – Lugoscher Gesang und Musikverein/Lugosi Dal- és Zeneegylet. The cultural life of Lugoj has been enriched over the years with the activity carried out by the Chamber Music Society (1869) and the Philharmonic Orchestra (1926).

=== Performing arts ===
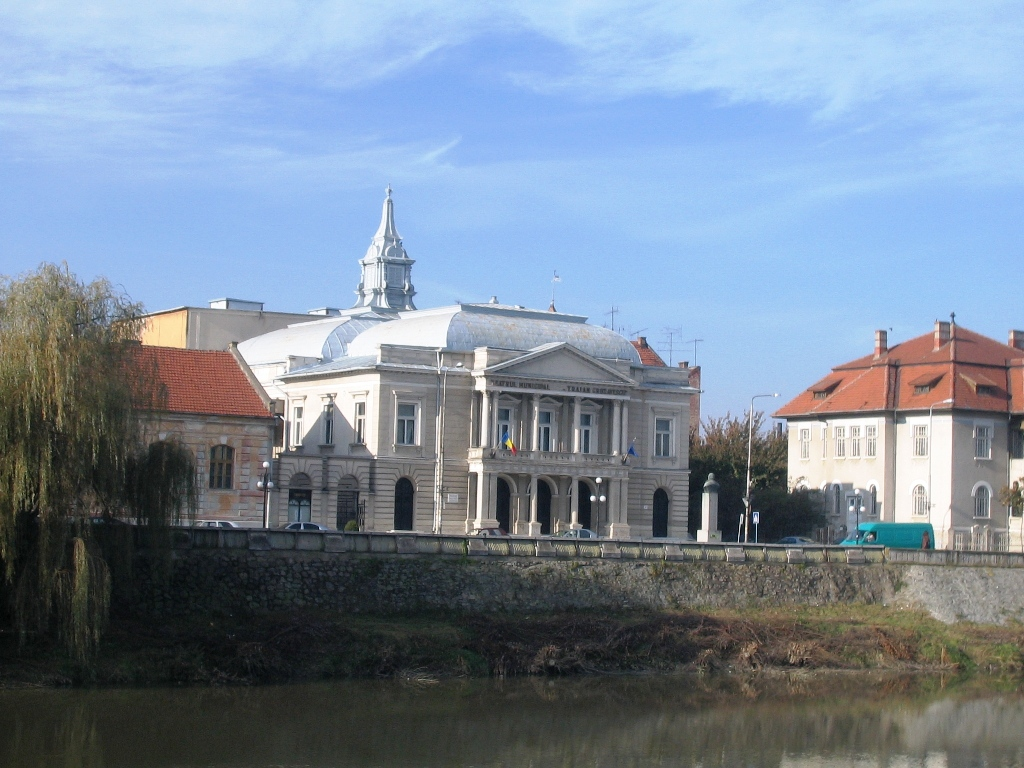
Traian Grozăvescu Theater

The first theater performance in Lugoj took place on 10 May 1841 and was a school theater performance staged by students from the local gymnasium. In January and February 1847, the Romanian Society of Theatrical Singers, under the direction of Iosif Farcaș, made up of several professional actors, presented the first performances in Romanian on the stage of the Lugoj Theater.

The current theater in Lugoj, named after tenor Traian Grozăvescu, was built between 1899 and 1900. The initiative to build the current Traian Grozăvescu Theater was made by Imre Jakabffy, count of Krassó-Szörény, who, after managing to get the land for the new theater, mobilized the local population who donated 24,000 kroner to build the theater.

During the interwar period, in Lugoj, several amateur theater societies were active: Thalia Romanian Theater Association, Banat Academic Circle, Musical Theater Society, which carried out a fruitful activity to promote the Romanian classical repertoire. It is worth mentioning that the Thalia Romanian Theater Association also took care of editing some collections of plays in one act, printing and disseminating, within ten years, almost 300 works.

Since 1992, the municipality and the theater of Lugoj have been organizing the only non-professional theater festival-competition with international participation in Romania.

=== Written press ===
Lugoj imposed a distinct coloratura in the landscape of Banat press in the 19th and early 20th centuries, with numerous German (Lugoser Anzeiger – 1852, Lugoscher Zeitung – 1905) and Hungarian newspapers and magazines (Krassó-Szörényi Lapok – 1879) published here, as well as valuable Romanian publications (newspapers Deșteptarea and Drapelul under the editorship of Valeriu Braniște). Currently, two local weekly newspapers appear in Lugoj, Actualitatea and Redeșteptarea.

== Education ==
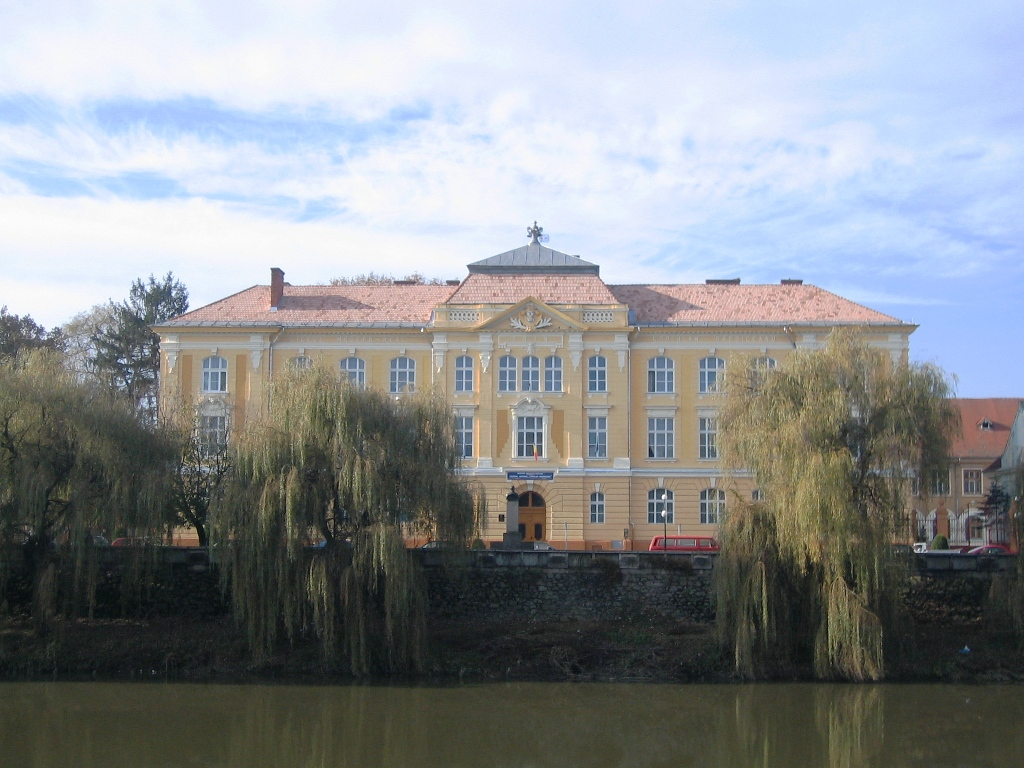
Coriolan Brediceanu National College

The first schools in Lugoj are mentioned in the 16th–17th centuries. In the 19th century, a rich didactic activity is already recorded, in the gymnasium and high school, where the teaching was done in Romanian. The first Romanian school in western Romania was built in Lugoj in 1770.

There are currently 17 kindergartens, 10 primary schools and four high schools in Lugoj: two national colleges – Coriolan Brediceanu National College (former Roman Catholic lyceum) and Iulia Hasdeu National College, Valeriu Braniște Technical College and Aurel Vlaicu Technological High School, as well as Filaret Barbu School of Fine Arts. In Lugoj there are a School Sports Club, a Children's Club and a Popular Arts School.

In terms of higher education, Drăgan European University, a private university with economic and juridic profiles, has been functioning in Lugoj since 1992.

== Architecture ==
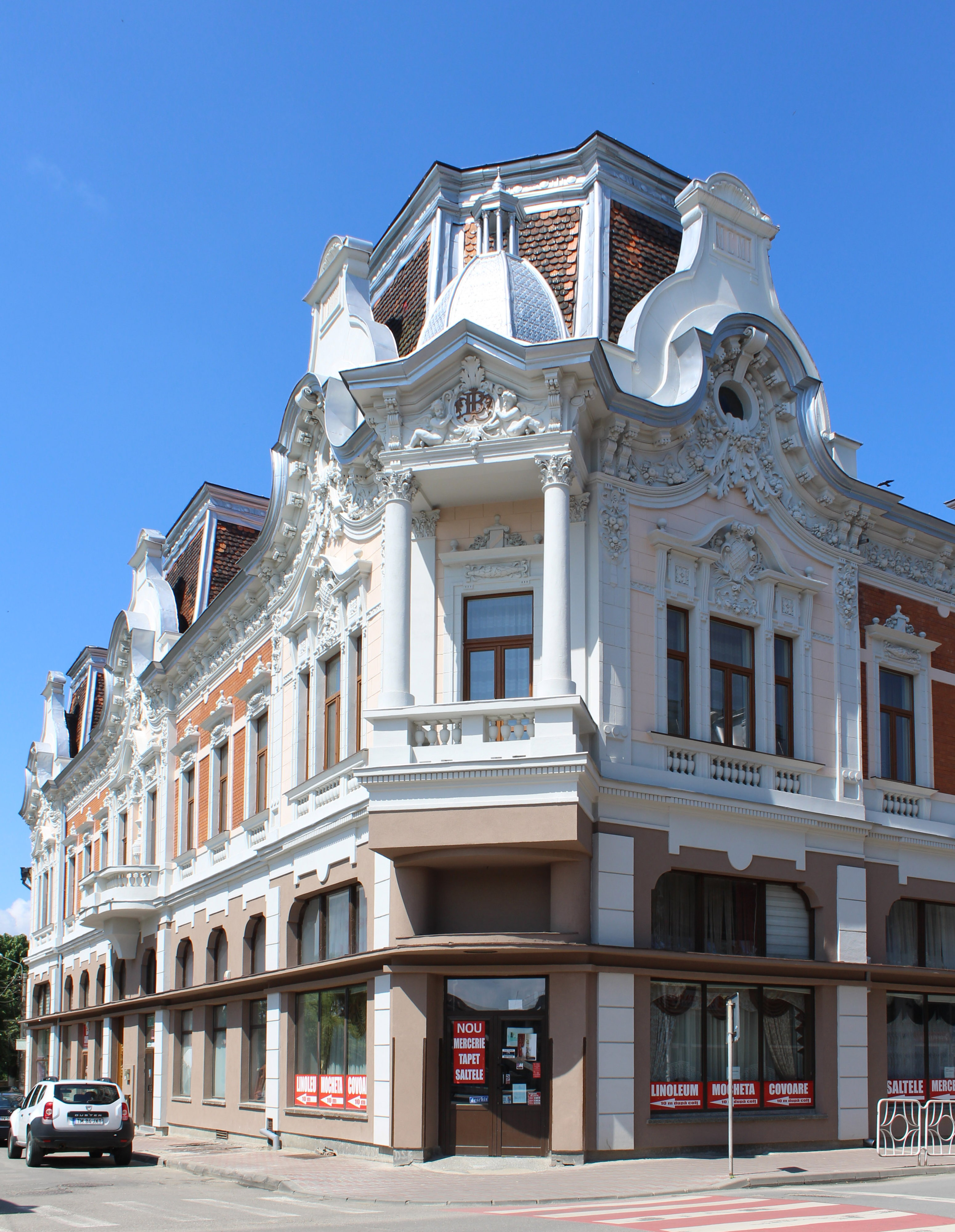
Bejan Palace in Iosif Constantin Drăgan Square

Most of the buildings of historical interest are concentrated in Iosif Constantin Drăgan Square. The square is flanked by "palaces for rent" built towards the end of the 19th century. These large buildings consisted of ground floor spaces and owner's home and apartments for rent upstairs. The prevailing architectural style of this period was Wiener Secession used throughout the Austro-Hungarian monarchy, combining the functional aspects with a rich decoration, but which did not aim to mask the constructive structure. One of the important public buildings of the city was the People's Palace built in 1904 according to the plans of royal architect Armin Villanyi. Occupying one side of Iosif Constantin Drăgan Square, the building hosted the headquarters of the bank of the Greek Catholic community in the city and the editorial office of Banat newspaper. The Palace of the Reformed Community (1906) was also designed by Villanyi.

Along with the Secession style, you can often find buildings with an eclectic style combined with neoclassical and Art Nouveau elements. Thus, between 1895 and 1896, the building of the current Coriolan Brediceanu National College was built, which has obvious Austrian Baroque influences, between 1898 and 1899, the building of the current History Museum was built, the facade of which is decorated in Baroque style, and between 1899 and 1900, the theater was built in neoclassical style.

The Bejan Palace of the Athanasievici-Bejan noble family was built between 1900 and 1901 based on the project of architect Karl Hart in an eclectic and Late Baroque style, with elements of Art Nouveau architecture, being one of the representative constructions of Lugoj. The Parvy-Haberehrn Palace was built in 1897 in eclectic style and is several years older than the Bejan Palace.

The court building was built between 1901 and 1906 in an eclectic style, combining classical elements, pilasters with Doric and Corinthian capitals in the upper register. The former headquarters of the financial administration, the current City Hall, was built between 1903 and 1905 and is of neoclassical design, as it is the Muschong Palace. Muschong Palace was built in the period immediately following the union, around 1926–1927, by architect Aladar Ferenczik for industrialist Jacob Muschong's family. The building was used as the Muschong family home, and on the ground floor were the brick factory offices and several shops.

The Palace of the Prefecture (located on the former Komitatsgasse), was built between 1843 and 1859 in the current urban ensemble Iosif Constantin Drăgan Square (historical monument ensemble) and functioned as the administrative headquarters of Krassó County (1860–1880), Krassó-Szörény County (1881–1919), Caraș-Severin County (1919–1926), as well as Severin County (1926–1950). It is a massive building in area, being one of the largest administrative buildings in Lugoj. The facade is imposing, with aspects of neoclassical architecture. Bought in 2016 by an Italian company, the building was transformed into a shopping gallery.

=== Religious buildings ===
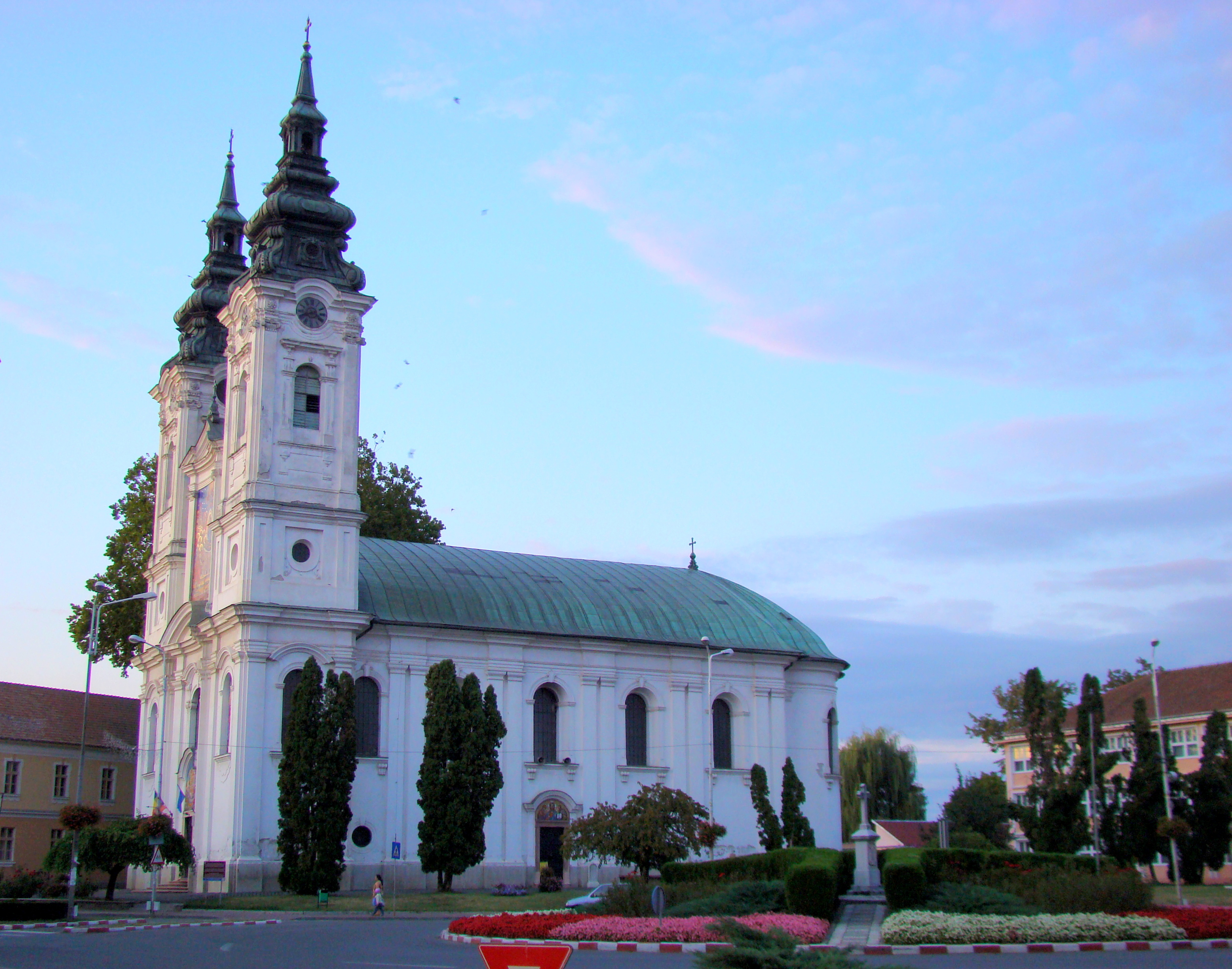
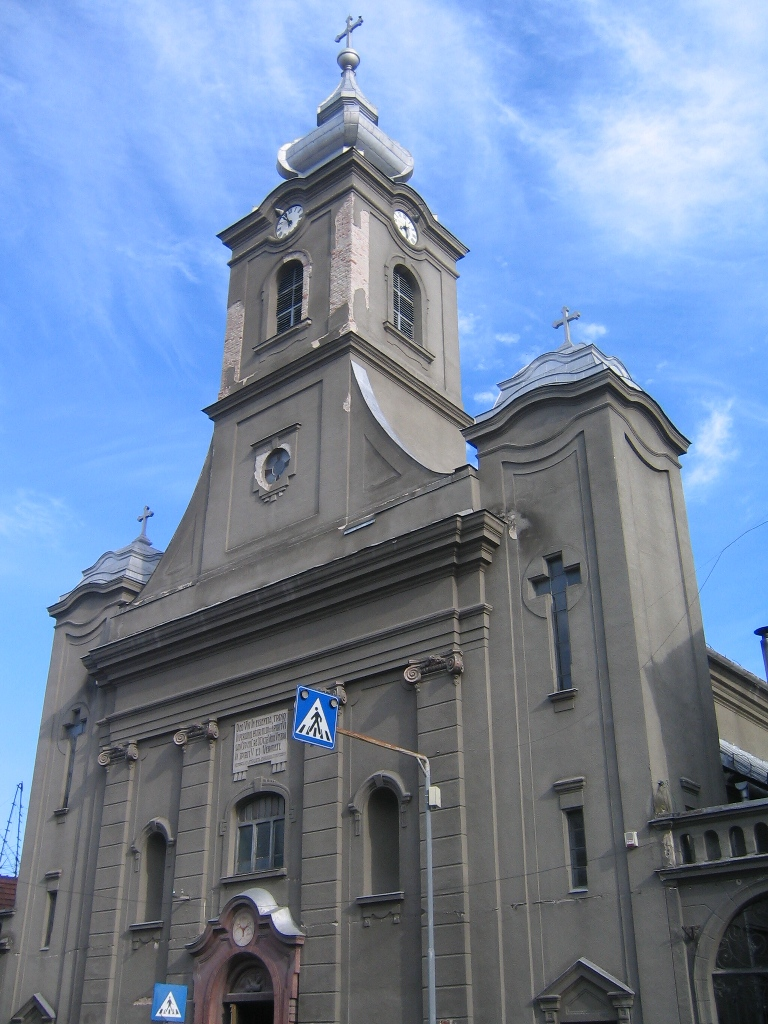
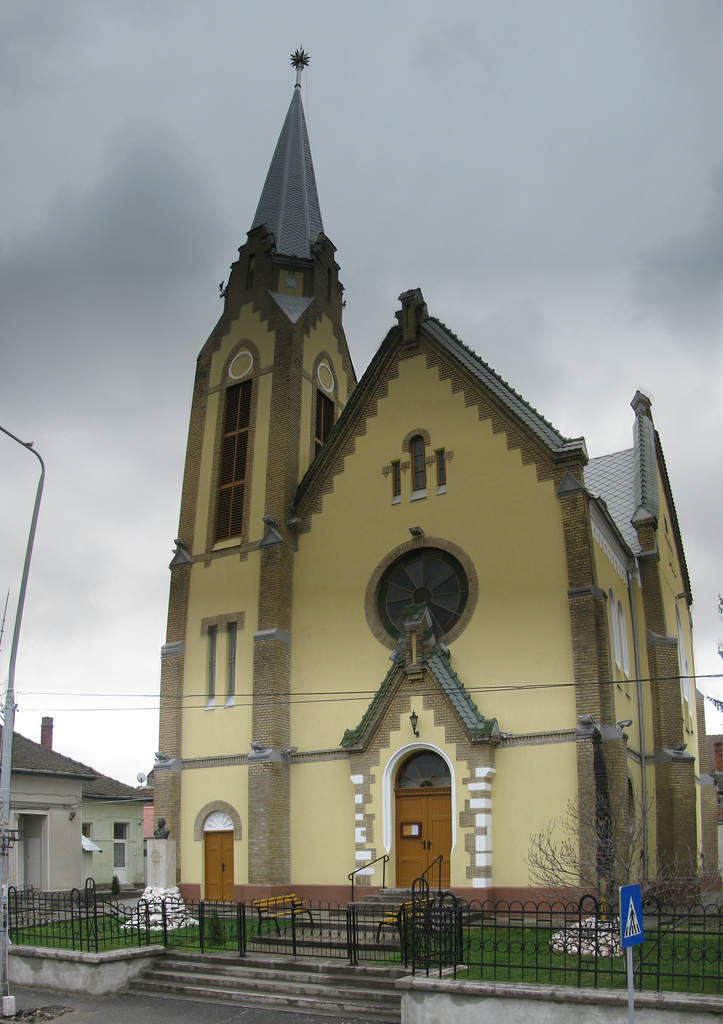
From the top: Dormition Church, Descent of the Holy Spirit Church, Roman Catholic Church and Reformed Church

Lugoj has 16 churches, chapels and conventicles, of which six Orthodox, three Roman Catholic, one Reformed and one Lutheran. A symbol of the city that also appears on the seal from 1793 is the Dormition of the Theotokos Church, Lugoj with its two bell towers. The construction made between 1759 and 1766, from the donations of the Romanian parishioners led by obor-knez Gavril Gureanu, follows a plan similar to that of the Timișoara Dome, designed by Viennese architect Joseph Emanuel Fischer von Erlach. The bell tower in its immediate vicinity belongs to the old church dedicated to St. Nicholas, whose beginnings are uncertain, most researchers attributing it to the ban of Severin's wife, Ecaterina Perian (1402). With the restoration of 1726 made by the obor-knez Ioan Raț of Mehadia, the tower on the west side is added to the church, with a bas-relief representing the face of St. Nicholas.

The Roman Catholic church was built between 1733 and 1735 by German settlers at the initiative of the "Convent of the Minorities" established between 1719 and 1722. Its interior ornaments and paintings are in the Baroque style, appreciated at the time throughout the Habsburg Empire.

The Greek Catholic cathedral dedicated to the Descent of the Holy Spirit is linked to the establishment of the Greek Catholic diocese based in Lugoj. Construction began in 1843 and was completed, due to frequent work stoppages, only in 1868 when it was consecrated by Bishop Alexandru Dobra. Made in neoclassical style, the church preserves the valuable interior fresco of neo-Byzantine influence made by Virgil Simonescu.

The city's current synagogue dates back to 1843, after the first Jewish place of worship was destroyed by the great fire of 1842.

From the contribution of the Roman Catholic parishioners of Hungarian origin, the St. Stephen's Chapel was built starting with 1780. Later, at the beginning of the 20th century, the building of the Reformed (Calvinist) church was erected with obvious influences of the Gothic style.

== Transport ==
Lugoj benefits from primary connectivity to the TEN-T Core network via A1 motorway (Bucharest–Nădlac), passing through the north of the city. Also to the north, in connection with the A1 motorway, a section of about 11 km of the A6 motorway was inaugurated in 2013, which will connect Lugoj and Calafat. Lugoj is also served by a 9.6 km ring road, inaugurated in 2010. The network of streets in Lugoj totals about 99 km, of which 75 km are modernized streets. At the municipal level, 95% of Lugoj streets are paved.

Regarding the railway transport, Lugoj station is located on the CFR Line 900. With the commissioning of the Lugoj–Ilia railway, on 17 September 1898, Lugoj became a railway junction.

Public passenger transport services are provided by Meridian 22, established in 2007, on four urban lines: 1C (train station–Agricultural High School), 7 (Tirol–Banatului Street–I.C. Drăgan neighborhood), 15 (I.C. Drăgan neighborhood–Old Post–Tirol) and 17 (Tapia–Măguri–Agricultural High School).

== Notable people ==
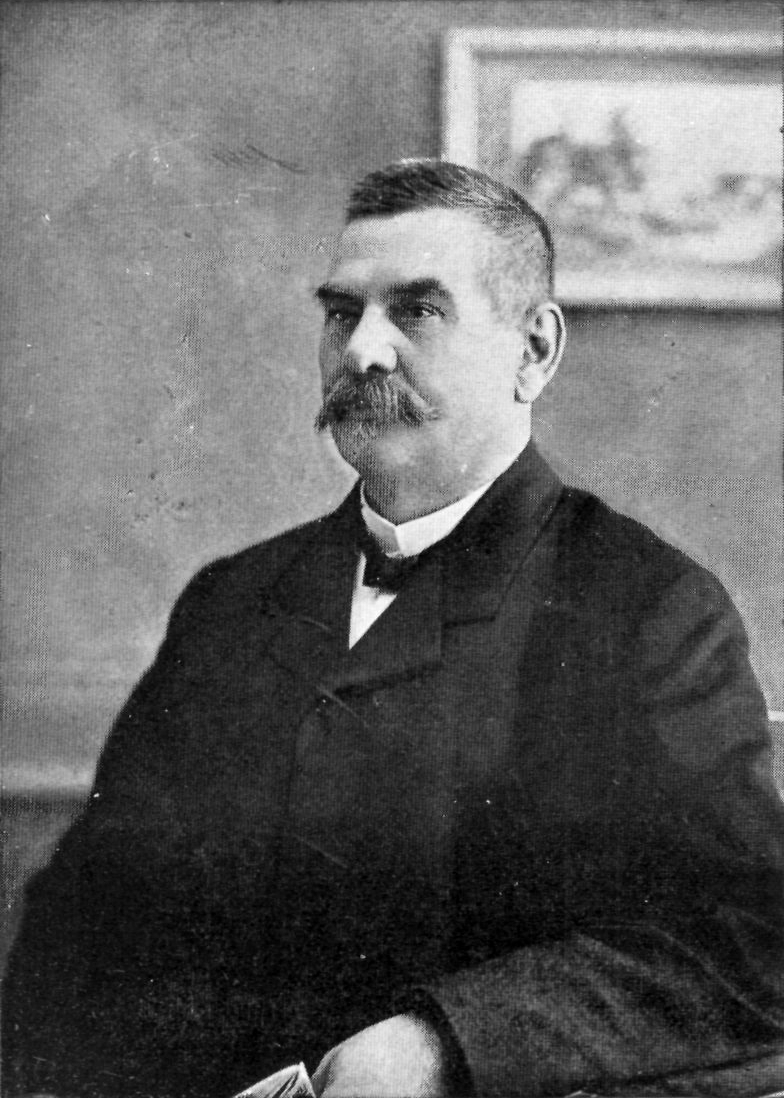
Coriolan Brediceanu

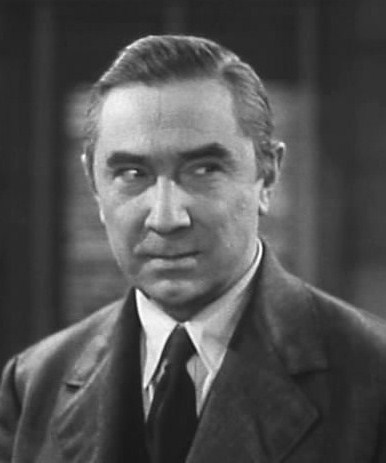
Bela Lugosi

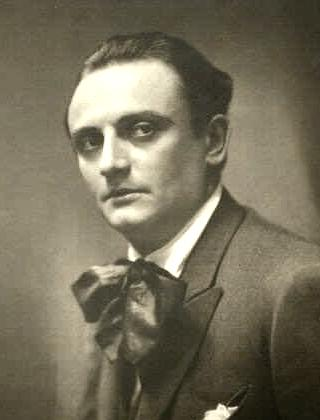
Traian Grozăvescu

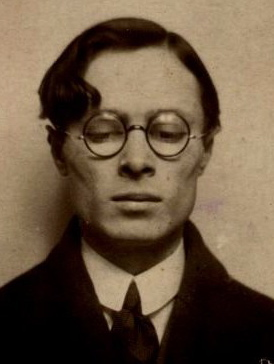
Georges Devereux

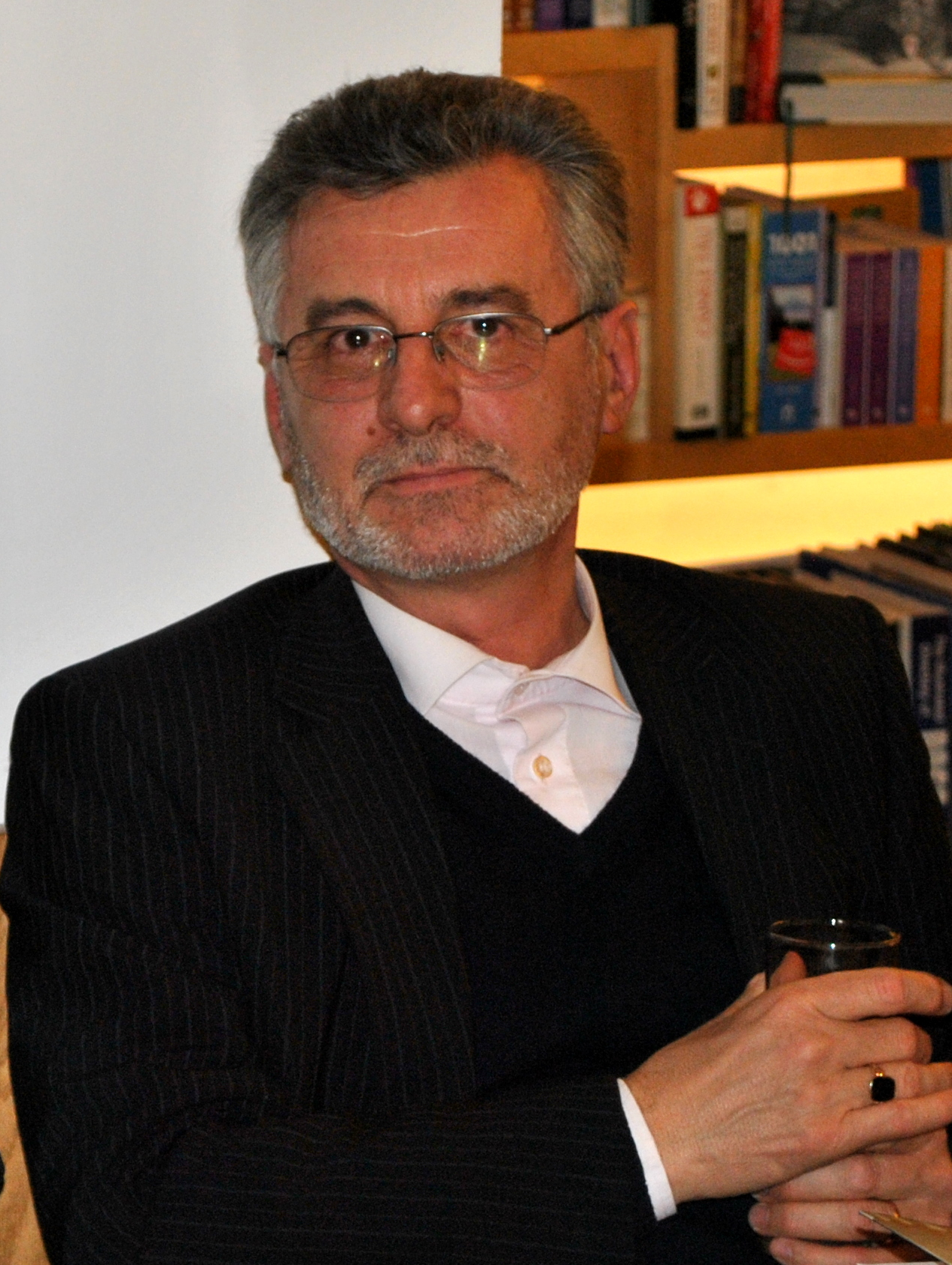
Victor Neumann

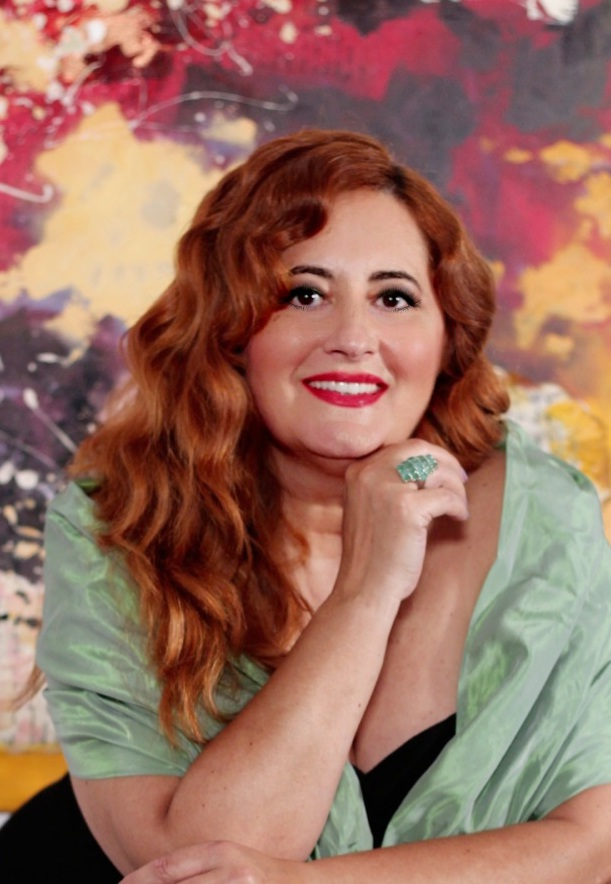
Aura Twarowska
- Konstantin Danil (1798/1802–1873), painter
- Karl Wilhelm von Martini (1821–1885), journalist, writer and politician
- Béla Szende (1823–1882), politician
- Vasile Maniu (1824–1901), publicist, historian, writer and lawyer
- August Kanitz (1843–1896), botanist
- Coriolan Brediceanu (1849–1909), lawyer and politician
- Aurel Popovici (1863–1917), lawyer and politician
- Ion Vidu (1863–1931), composer and choral conductor
- Ioan Popovici-Bănățeanul (1869–1893), writer
- Antal Horger (1872–1946), philologist
- Viktor Madin (1876–1968), operatic baritone
- Tiberiu Brediceanu (1877–1968), composer
- Caius Brediceanu (1879–1953), politician and diplomat
- Emmerich Schwach (1880–1959), composer, violinist, conductor and choir director
- Bela Lugosi (1882–1956), actor
- Andor Arató (1887–1964), church musician and composer
- Victor Vlad (1889–1967), architect and construction engineer
- Koloman Wallisch (1889–1934), labor leader
- Traian Grozăvescu (1895–1927), operatic tenor
- Petre Chirculescu (1898–1975), equestrian
- Aurel Ciupe (1900–1988), painter and drawer
- Sepp Helfrich (1900–1963), politician
- Filaret Barbu (1903–1984), operetta composer
- Georges Devereux (1908–1985), ethnologist and psychoanalyst
- Ion Horvath (1912–?), Greco-Roman wrestler
- Iosif Slivăț (1915–?), footballer
- Iosif Constantin Drăgan (1917–2008), businessman, writer and historian
- György Kurtág (b. 1926), composer and pianist
- Josef Posipal (1927–1997), footballer
- Alexandru Șuli (1928–2000), Greco-Roman wrestler
- Francisc Horvath (b. 1928), Greco-Roman wrestler
- Walter Michael Klepper (1929–2008), composer
- Gelu Barbu (1932–2016), ballet dancer and choreographer
- Edmund Höfer (1933–2014), photographer
- Dumitru Pârvulescu (1933–2007), Greco-Roman wrestler
- Michael Redl (1936–2013), handball player and coach
- Edgar Pick (b. 1938), immunologist
- Aristide Buhoiu (1938–2006), journalist, television director and writer
- Helmut Klimek (b. 1941), composer and music teacher
- Gheorghe Schwartz (b. 1945), writer
- Simona Arghir (1948–1995), handballer
- Alina Goreac (b. 1952), artistic gymnast
- Victor Neumann (b. 1953), historian, political analyst and professor
- Kurt Szilier (b. 1957), gymnast
- Valentin Pîntea (b. 1962), gymnast
- Aura Twarowska (b. 1967), mezzo-soprano
- Lavinia Miloșovici (b. 1976), artistic gymnast
- Otilia Ruicu-Eșanu (b. 1978), 400-meter runner
- Florin Nanu (b. 1983), footballer
- Corina Căprioriu (b. 1986), judoka
- Alin Șeroni (b. 1987), footballer
- Emaa (b. 1992), singer and songwriter

== Twin towns and sister cities ==
Lugoj is twinned with:

- (Hungary) Szekszárd (1993)
- (Germany) Jena (1993)
- (France) Orléans (1994)
- (Moldova) Nisporeni (2001)
- (Greece) Corinth (2004)
- (Serbia) Vršac (2005)
- (Italy) Monopoli (2006)
- (North Macedonia) Kriva Palanka (2011)
- (Hungary) Makó (2016)
- (Serbia) Veliko Gradište (2016)
