= Aura Twarowska =

Romanian mezzo-soprano (born 1967)

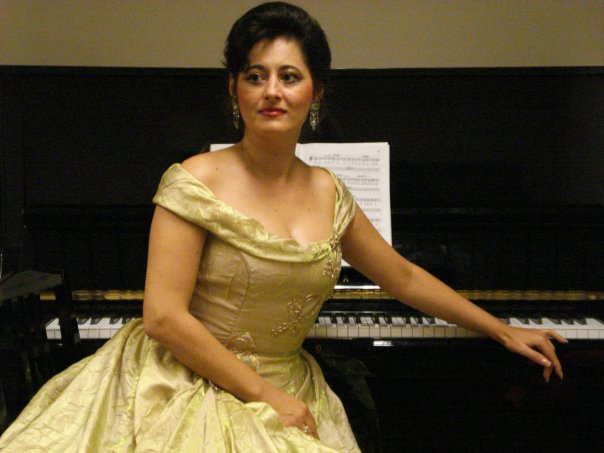
Aura Twarowska

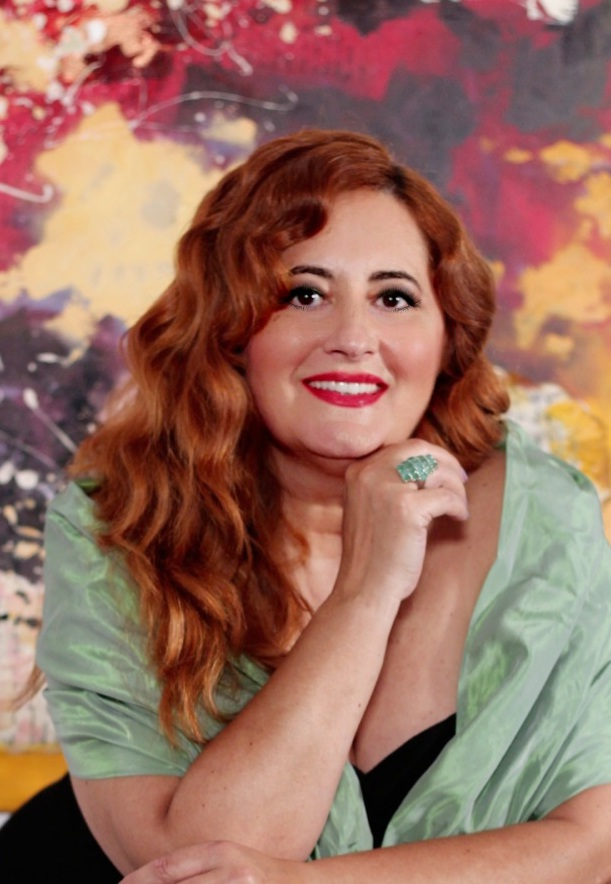
Aura Twarowska in 2021

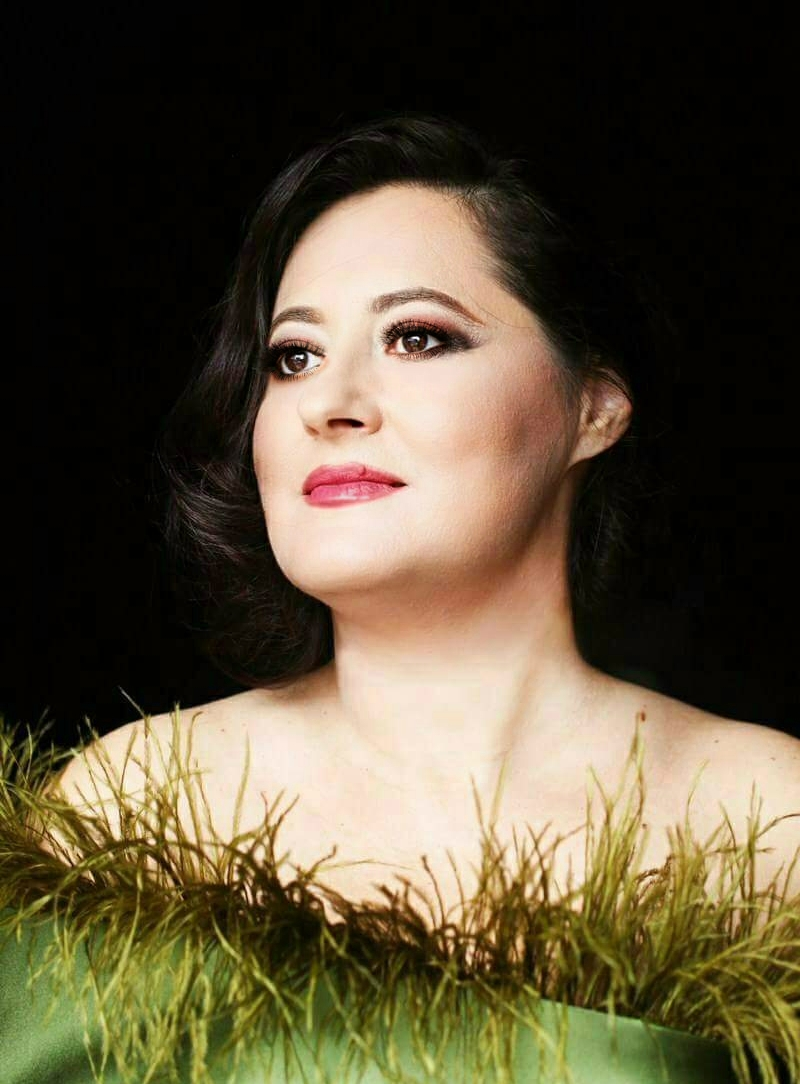
Aura Twarowska in 2019

Aura Twarowska (born 21 November 1967 as Aurora Eleonora Avram in Lugoj, Romania) is a Romanian mezzo-soprano. She was soloist of the Romanian Opera in Timișoara (1997–2010) and at the Vienna State Opera (2007–2016).

== Biography ==
International collaborations and tours opened her way to other European theatres and subsequently led to her engagement as singer at the Vienna State Opera in 2007.

== Stage appearances ==
=== Vienna State Opera ===
- Giacomo Puccini – Madama Butterfly
- Richard Wagner – Die Walküre
- Pyotr Ilyich Tchaikovsky – Pique Dame
- Leoš Janáček

- Jenůfa

- Richard Strauss – Der Rosenkavalier
- Modest Mussorgsky – Boris Godunov
- Jacques Offenbach – The Tales of Hoffmann
- Vincenzo Bellini – La sonnambula
- Gioachino Rossini – Il barbiere di Siviglia
- Pyotr Ilyich Tchaikovsky – Eugene Onegin
- Pietro Mascagni – Cavalleria rusticana
- Richard Wagner – Der fliegende Holländer
- Richard Wagner – Götterdämmerung
- Gaetano Donizetti – La fille du régiment

=== Vienna Volksoper ===
- Richard Wagner/Loriot – Wagners Ring an einem Abend

=== Vienna Musikverein ===
- Ludwig van Beethoven – Ninth Symphony

=== George Enescu Festival, Bucharest ===
- Wolfgang Amadeus Mozart – Krönungsmesse (2001)
- George Enescu – Œdipe, Jocasta (2003)
- Ludwig van Beethoven – Ninth Symphony (2005), conductor Zubin Mehta

=== Carré Theatre, Amsterdam ===
- Georges Bizet – Carmen, Carmen
- Johann Strauss II – Die Fledermaus, Orlovski

=== Concertgebouw, Amsterdam ===
- George Frideric Handel – Messiah
- Giuseppe Verdi – Requiem

=== Esplanade, Singapore ===
- Wolfgang Amadeus Mozart – Le nozze di Figaro, Marcellina

=== Graz Opera, Austria ===
- Pietro Mascagni – Cavalleria Rusticana 2018–2019

=== Romanian National Opera, Bucharest ===
- Georges Bizet – Carmen, Carmen
- Giuseppe Verdi – Aida, Amneris; Requiem
- George Enescu – Œdipe, Jocasta, premiere

=== Romanian National Opera, Timișoara ===
- Giuseppe Verdi – Aida, Amneris; Rigoletto, Maddalena, premiere; Otello, Emilia, premiere
- Giacomo Puccini – Madama Butterfly, Suzuki
- Georges Bizet – Carmen, Carmen

=== Romanian National Opera, Cluj-Napoca ===
- Georges Bizet – Carmen, Carmen

== Discography ==
- Richard Wagner – Der Ring des Nibelungen (Waltraute), Deutsche Grammophon
