= Koloman Wallisch =

Austrian politician (1889–1934)

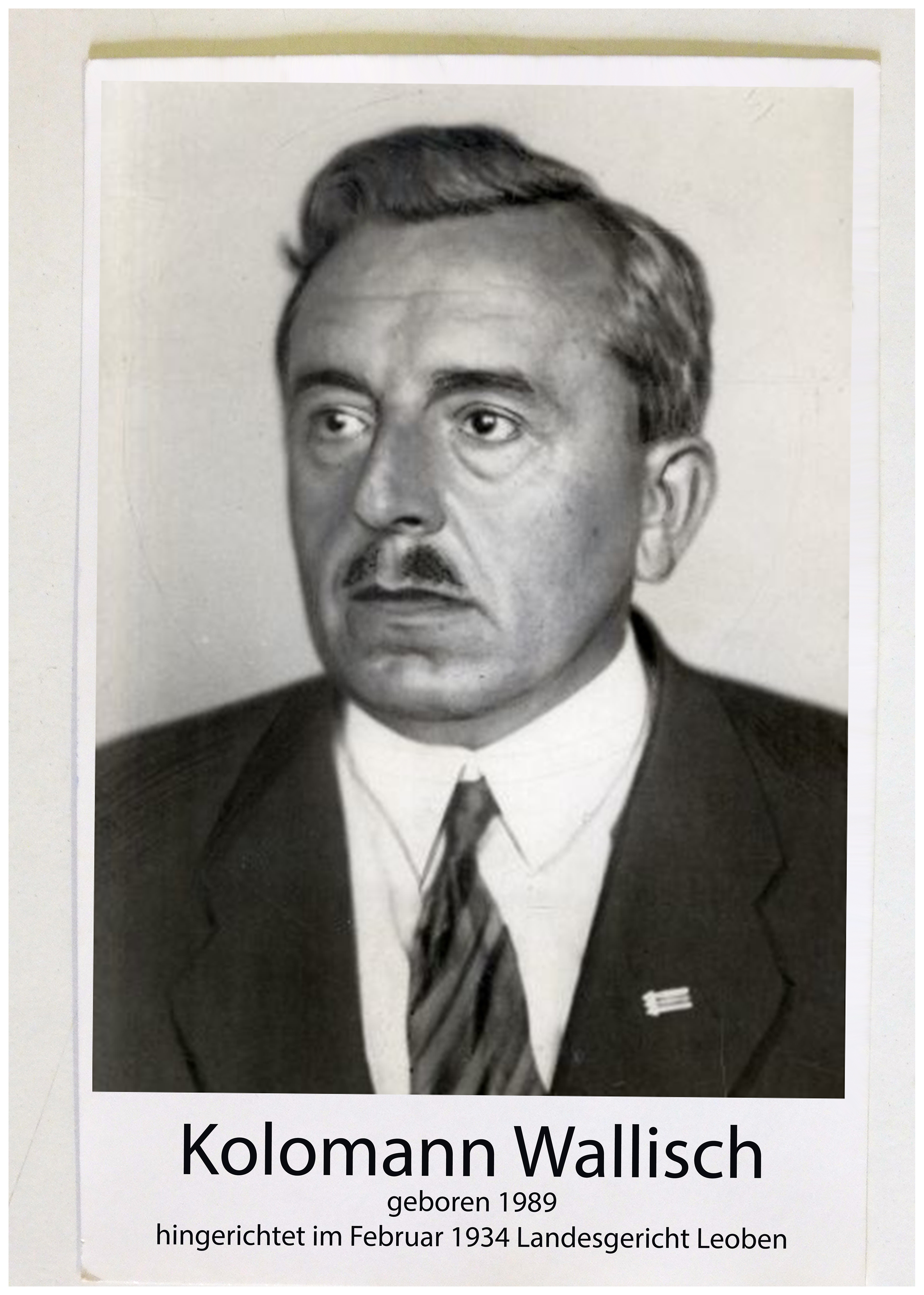
Koloman Wallisch

Koloman Wallisch (28 February 1889 in Lugosch, Austria-Hungary (today Lugoj, Romania) – 19 February 1934 in Leoben, Austria) was a socialist labor leader and revolutionary in Austria.

Wallisch was national secretary of the Austrian socialist party SPÖ and a delegate in the Austrian national assembly from 1930 to 1934.

After calling for a general strike in 1934, he took to arms and tried to take over Bruck an der Mur during the Austrian Civil War. After the Austrian national guard was approaching the city, he fled into the mountains with 320 followers to wage guerrilla warfare. However, he was captured by the authorities on 18 February 1934 and after a brief interrogation and trial, he was executed by Josef Lang using an Austrian version of the Garrote (Würgegalgen) in the courtyard of Leoben. There is a first-hand account of his arrest, trial and execution in the Vienna Diary of Naomi Mitchison, published shortly after her return to Britain in 1934.

After World War II, three Austrian cities – Leoben, Bruck an der Mur and Kapfenberg – named city squares in his honor and Bertolt Brecht wrote a poem about his struggles.

In 1983, a movie was made documenting his life and times.
