= Dormition of the Theotokos Church, Lugoj =

Heritage site in Timiș County, Romania

Dormition of the Theotokos Church
- Biserica „Adormirea Maicii Domnului”
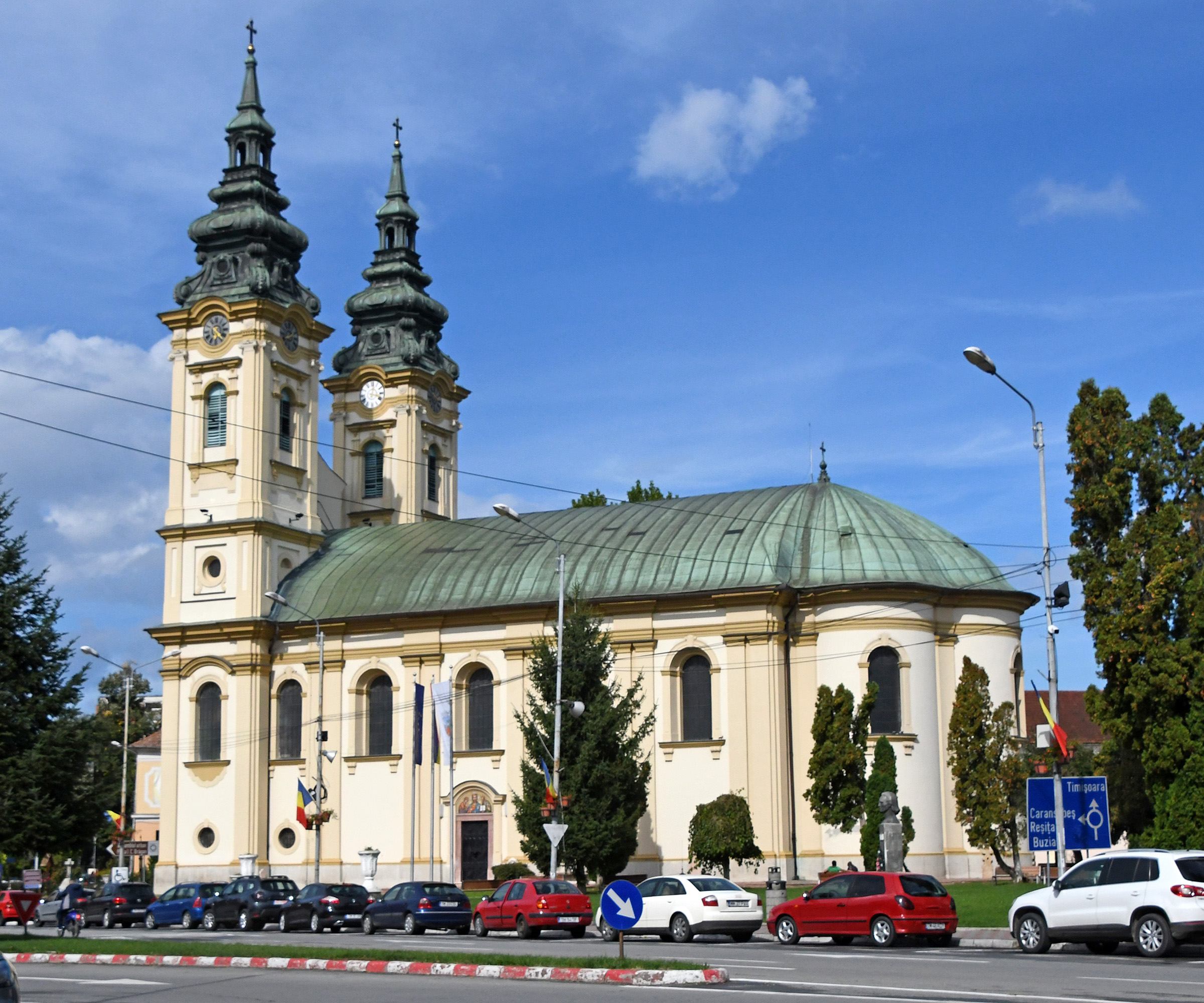

Religion
- Affiliation: Romanian Orthodox
- Ecclesiastical or organizational status: Lugoj Deanery
- Patron: Dormition of the Theotokos
- Year consecrated: 1766, 1944
- Status: Active

Location
- Location: 2 Victory Square, Lugoj
- Country: Romania
- Interactive map of Dormition of the Theotokos Church
- Coordinates: 45°41′13″N 21°54′23″E

Architecture
- Style: Baroque
- Founder: Gavriil Gureanu
- Groundbreaking: 1759
- Completed: 1766

Specifications
- Length: 42 m
- Width: 21 m
- Spire: 2
- Spire height: 57 m

The Dormition of the Theotokos Church (Romanian: Biserica „Adormirea Maicii Domnului”), also known locally as the Two-Towered Church, is a Romanian Orthodox church located at 2 Victory Square, Lugoj, Romania. It is dedicated to the Dormition of the Theotokos.

One of the most imposing Baroque constructions in Banat, the church is listed as a historic monument by Romania's Ministry of Culture.

== History ==
The church was built in Baroque style from 1759 to 1766. Its ktetor was Gavriil Gureanu (or Gavrilă Gurean), an obor-knez of the Banat of Temeswar. His portrait is painted on the eastern wall of the nave. The church was consecrated by Bishop Ioan Georgevici. His successor, Bishop Iosif Ioanovici, coming to Lugoj on a canonical visit, found a lack of proportion between the body of the church and the towers, which he considered too short, proposing that they be raised to an appropriate height.

== Architecture ==
The church has a length of 42 meters, a width of 21 meters, and the height up to the vaults of the dome (so without towers) is 15.7 meters. The height of the towers is 57 meters.

The church has a single nave. The altar has a trefoil shape, with the vaulting system in spherical triangles, with radial arches supported on triple pilasters with very prominent cornices and Ionic capitals. The temple has an accentuated triumphal arch. The rectangular nave with a vela vault (double curvature) includes bays separated by doubles, with a very pronounced cornice; the profiles were enlarged during the restoration in 1944. Low balustrades were applied to the windows.

The semicircular roof is coated in sheets of brass and provided with dormers. The portals are 3.8 meters high. The floor is made of tiles from Kelheim. There are two towers, each with a neo-Baroque bulb. The left one has three bells, while the right has two large ones. The interior is noted for its acoustics.
