= Traian Grozăvescu =

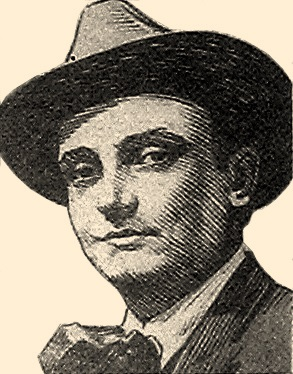
- Drawing of Grozăvescu
- Born: 21 November 1895; Lugoj
- Died: 14 February 1927 (aged 31)
- Occupation: Operatic tenor

Traian Grozăvescu (21 November 1895 – 15 February 1927) was an Austro-Hungarian-born Romanian operatic tenor. Born in Lugoj, he served in the Austro-Hungarian Army in World War I. In 1922, following a disagreement with the Cluj Opera, he left for Vienna and sang at the Vienna State Opera, as well as at the Hungarian State Opera House and the Berlin State Opera, achieving great success.

== Death ==
He was killed with a revolver by his jealous wife and buried in his native town.
