= Ioan Popovici-Bănățeanul =

Austro-Hungarian-born Romanian prose writer and poet

Ioan Popovici-Bănățeanul (born Ioan Popovici; April 17, 1869 – September 9, 1893) was an Austro-Hungarian-born Romanian prose writer and poet.

== Biography ==
Born in Lugoj, Romania into a family of small-scale craftsmen, his father Nicolae Popovici made opinci, while his mother Susana (née Dobrin) sold produce at the market. In 1884, he was expelled from the local Hungarian Catholic gymnasium, and he continued his schooling at Brașov and Beiuș from 1884 to 1889. He then entered the theological and pedagogical institute of Caransebeș, which he attended from 1889 to 1892 but did not complete. In 1886, in Familia, he published a cycle of folk poems that he gathered in the Lugoj area. His original poetry debut came in 1888, in Tribuna. He moved to Bucharest, the capital of the Romanian Old Kingdom, in search of a social and literary position; from 1892 to 1893, he worked as an accountant at the League for the Cultural Unity of All Romanians.

He won the admiration and support of Titu Maiorescu, who brought him to the attention of both contemporaries and posterity. In 1893, Maiorescu published his most representative verses and short stories (such as "În lume" and "După un an de jale") in Convorbiri Literare. He also wrote the preface to Popovici's only published book, which arrived posthumously, the 1895 short story collection Din viața meseriașilor. It was also Maiorescu who gave him the name Bănățeanul. Popovici sometimes used the pen names Niță de la Lugoj and Oreste. Working from German texts, he translated Henrik Ibsen, Bjørnstjerne Bjørnson and Ivan Turgenev. Afflicted by lung disease, he returned to Lugoj to die at home; his premature death cut short what appeared to be a promising career.
