= Anthony Segal =

British physician (born 1944)

Anthony Segal FRS FMedSci (born 24 February 1944) is a British physician/scientist.

== Education ==
He was educated at the University of Cape Town (MB ChB, MD) and University of London (MSc, DSc, PhD). Fellow of: UCL, Royal College of Physicians, The College of Medicine of South Africa

== Career and research ==
Tony Segal was born in Johannesburg, South Africa, and grew up in Bulawayo, in a Jewish family, in what was then Southern Rhodesia (now Zimbabwe). He was schooled locally and then studied medicine at the University of Cape Town and Groote Schuur Hospital, where he undertook house-physician and house-surgeon positions. After six months as a medical registrar in the cardiothoracic department of Wentworth Hospital in Durban he moved to London where he attended the Royal College of Surgeons and obtained his primary fellowship. He then worked in the Accident and Emergency department at the Hammersmith Hospital, followed by six months as senior house officer to the rheumatologist Eric Bywaters.

Segal then moved to the MRC Clinical Research Centre as registrar in Gastroenterology, during which time he studied Biochemistry at evening classes at Chelsea College of Science and Technology. Over the next decade, he specialised as a gastroenterologist and held various positions at Northwick Park Hospital and Hammersmith Hospital before moving to University College London as a Wellcome Trust Senior Clinical Fellow. In 1986 he was appointed to the Charles Dent Chair of Medicine and Head of the Centre for Molecular Medicine, a position that he held until April 2020. In May 2020 he was a co-founder and appointed as CEO, of Imhotex, a company formed for the development of drugs to treat Crohn's disease.

Initially a clinical gastroenterologist, his interest in immunity resulted in him starting a clinical service for immunodeficiency. He served on the Council of the European Society for Clinical Investigation for four years, and in 1984 he started the Phagocyte Workshop of that society, which is running to this day. He was a member of three of the finding panels of the Wellcome Trust, chairing the International Interest group. In 1998 he was a founding Fellow of the Academy of Medical Sciences and was elected as a Fellow of the Royal Society, and has served on and chaired, several Royal Society committees. In 2014 he was awarded the UCL Prize Lecture in Clinical Science Prize. His recent work is concerned with Crohn's disease and the role played by neutrophils in killing bacteria and fungi.

=== Major areas of research ===
Segal has had diverse research interests. His major discoveries have been the NADPH oxidase and causes of Chronic Granulomatous Disease (CGD): The identity of the NADPH oxidase that generates superoxide in myeloid cells. He showed it to be a low potential flavocytochrome and demonstrated that mutations in the gene coding for it, and for its activating proteins, cause the severe immunodeficiency disease of Chronic Granulomatous Disease (CGD).

He showed that the mechanism by which microbes are killed within the phagocytic vacuole of neutrophils is not through the toxic actions of oxygen free radicals or through the generation of HOCl by myeloperoxidase. The oxidase elevates the pH within the phagocytic vacuole and drives potassium into this compartment to compensate for the charge generated across the membrane by the passage of electrons. The elevated pH and potassium concentration activate the neutral proteases, cathepsin G and elastase, which kill and digest the microbes.

He determined the causes of Crohn's disease, a chronic granulomatous inflammation that predominantly affects the terminal small bowel and colon. He demonstrated that the common underlying pathogenesis of this condition is a failure of acute inflammation as a consequence of which faecal material gaining access through the mucosa of the bowel is not cleared from the tissues, where it festers, resulting in the characteristic chronic inflammation.

== Publications ==
>300 publications H-Index 75

=== NADPH oxidase and Chronic Granulomatous Disease ===
- Segal, A W; O T, Jones (1978). "Novel cytochrome b system in phagocytic vacuoles of human granulocytes". Nature. 276 (5687): 515–517. Bibcode:1978Natur.276..515S. doi:10.1038/276515a0. PMID 723935. S2CID 31450734.
- Segal, A W; A R, Cross; R C, Garcia; N, Borregaard; N H, Valerius; J F, Soothill; O T, Jones (1983). "Absence of cytochrome b-245 in chronic granulomatous disease. A multicenter European evaluation of its incidence and relevance". New England Journal of Medicine. 308 (5): 245–251. doi:10.1056/NEJM198302033080503. PMID 6848934.
- Segal, Anthony W (2016). "NADPH oxidases as electrochemical generators to produce ion fluxes and turgor in fungi, plants and humans". Open Biology. 6 (5) 160028. doi:10.1098/rsob.160028. PMC 4892433. PMID 27249799.

=== Microbial killing ===
- Levine, Adam P; Duchen, Michael R; De Villiers, Simon; Rich, Peter R; Segal, Anthony W (2015). "Alkalinity of Neutrophil Phagocytic Vacuoles is Modulated by HVCN1 and Has Consequences for Myeloperoxidase Activity". PLOS ONE. 10 (4) e0125906. Bibcode:2015PLoSO..1025906L. doi:10.1371/journal.pone.0125906. PMC 4401748. PMID 25885273.
- Levine, Adam P.; Segal, Anthony W. (2016). "The NADPH Oxidase and Microbial Killing by Neutrophils, with a Particular Emphasis on the Proposed Antimicrobial Role of Myeloperoxidase within the Phagocytic Vacuole" (PDF). Microbiology Spectrum. 4 (4). doi:10.1128/microbiolspec.MCHD-0018-2015. PMID 27726789.
- Segal, A. W (2005). "How neutrophils kill microbes". Annual Review of Immunology. 23: 197–223. doi:10.1146/annurev.immunol.23.021704.115653. PMC 2092448. PMID 15771570.

=== Cause of Crohn's Disease ===
- Segal, Anthony W; Loewi, G (1976). "Neutrophil dysfunction in Crohn's disease". Lancet. 2 (7979): 219–221. doi:10.1016/s0140-6736(76)91024-2. PMID 59239. S2CID 46411284.
- Marks, Daniel J B; Marcus W N, Harbord; Raymond, MacAllister; Farooq Z, Rahman; Jodi, Young; Bissan, Al-Lazikani; William, Lees; Farooq Z, Rahman; Marco, Novelli; Stuart, Bloom; Anthony W, Segal (2006). "Defective acute inflammation in Crohn's disease: a clinical investigation". Lancet. 367 (9511): 668–678. doi:10.1016/S0140-6736(06)68265-2. PMID 16503465. S2CID 13898663.
- Smith, AM; FZ, Rahman; B, Hayee; SJ, Graham; DJ, Marks; GW, Sewell; CD, Palmer; J, Wilde; BM, Foxwell; IS, Gloger; T, Sweeting; M, Marsh; AP, Walker; SL, Bloom; AW, Segal (2009). "Disordered macrophage cytokine secretion underlies impaired acute inflammation and bacterial clearance in Crohn's disease". Journal of Experimental Medicine. 206 (9): 1883–97. doi:10.1084/jem.20091233. PMC 2737162. PMID 19652016.
- Segal, Anthony W (2016). "Making sense of the cause of Crohn's – a new look at an old disease". F1000Research. 5: 2510. doi:10.12688/f1000research.9699.2. PMC 5224693. PMID 28105308.
