= Roads in Romania =

Romania's National Road Network

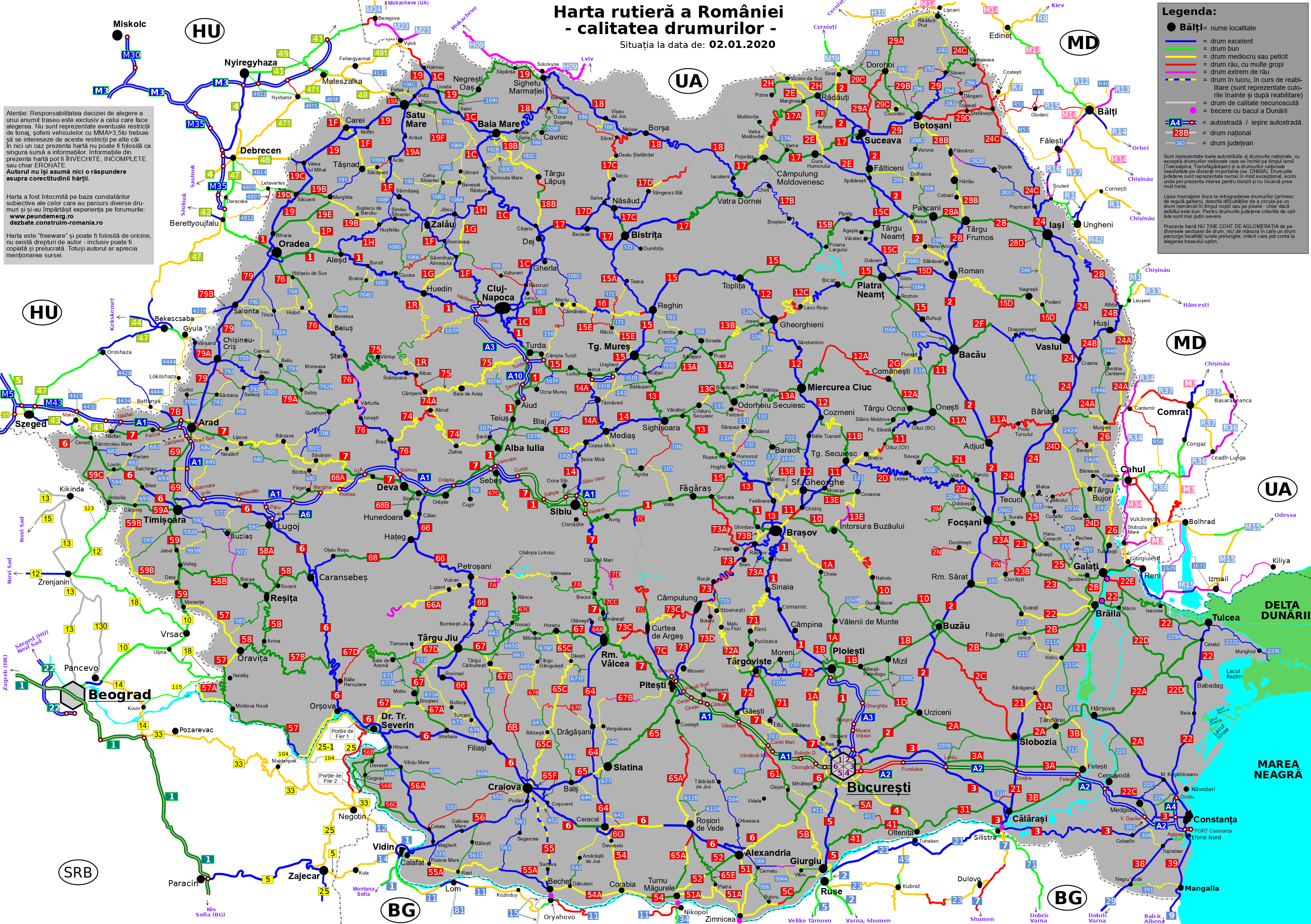
Road network in Romania by quality (since 2 January 2020)

Public roads in Romania are ranked according to importance and traffic as follows:

- motorways (autostradă – pl. autostrăzi) – colour: green; designation: A followed by one or two digits
- expressways (drum expres – pl. drumuri express) – colour: red; designation: DEx followed by one or two digits and an optional letter
- national road (drum național – pl. drumuri naționale) – colour: red; designation: DN followed by one or two digits and an optional letter
- county road (drum județean – pl. drumuri județene) – colour: blue; designation: DJ followed by three digits and an optional letter; unique numbers per county
- local road (drum comunal – pl. drumuri comunale) – colour: yellow; designated DC followed by a number and an optional letter; unique numbers per county

Some of the national roads are part of the European route scheme. European routes passing through Romania: E58; E60; E70; E85; E79; E81; E68; E87 (Class A); E574; E576; E581; E583; E671; E771.

As of 31 December 2021, public roads totaled 86,199 km (53,562 mi): 17,530 km (20.3%) national roads, 35,096 km (40.7%) county roads and 33,573 km (39%) local roads.

From the point of view of the type of cover, the structure of the public road network registers at the end of 2022 was: 41,653 km (48,2%) modernized roads (94,1% with asphalt pavements of heavy/medium type and 5.9% with concrete), 20,956 km (24.3%) with light-duty asphalt surface, 15,713 km (18,2%) stone paving (such as sett paving or cobblestone roads) and 8,014 km (9,3%) dirt roads.

Regarding the technical condition, 29,9% of modernized roads and 41,1% of roads with light road clothing have exceeded their "service life".

== Motorways ==
Development of the overall length (at the end of):

Total length of highways in use in Romania
| Year | 1972 | 1987 | 2000 | 2002 | 2004 | 2007 | 2008 | 2009 | 2010 | 2011 | 2012 | 2013 | 2014 | 2015 | 2016 | 2017 | 2018 | 2019 | 2020 | 2021 | 2022 | 2023 | 2024 |
| Length in km | 96 | 113 | 113* | 113* | 228 | 262 | 262* | 304 | 332 | 390 | 530 | 635 | 685 | 711 | 732 | 748 | 806 | 850 | 914 | 946 | 996 | 1,033 | 1,272 |

Motorways are identified by A followed by a number. As of April 2024, Romania has 1,098 km of motorway in use, with another 720 km under construction. In recent years, a master plan for the national motorway network has been developed and many works have begun around the country, which will result in significant changes by 2015, and eventually by 2022.

There are few tolls for using roads in Romania. There is one at the Giurgeni – Vadu Oii Bridge over the river Danube on highway DN2A at Vadu Oii and one at the Cernavodă Bridge, on the A2 motorway, a 17 km long section between Fetești and Cernavodă which consists of two road/railway bridges. Nevertheless, every owner of a car that uses a motorway (A) or a national road (DN) in Romania must purchase a vignette (rovinietă) from any of the main petrol stations or at any post office throughout the country.

| Trunk Motorway | Route | Planned (km) / Built (km) | Remarks |
|---|---|---|---|
| A 0 | Beltway around Bucharest | 101 / 70 | The southern half opened in 2025 and is operational. Only the Corbeanca–Afumati section in the northern half is complete; the remaining sections are under construction. |
| A 1 | Bucharest – Pitești – Sibiu – Deva – Lugoj – Timișoara – Arad – Nădlac → Hungary | 580 / 487 | Bucharest – Curtea de Argeș (140 km), Boița – Holdea (187 km), Margina – Nădlac (159 km) sections are operational. Between Boița–Nădlac, the tunnels from Holdea–Margina are under construction. The Boița–Sibiu section was opened at the end of 2022. |
| A 2 | Bucharest – Fetești – Cernavodă – Constanța | 203 / 203 | Operational on the entire length; first fully completed Romanian motorway. |
| A 3 | Bucharest – Ploiești – Brașov – Sighișoara – Târgu Mureș – Cluj-Napoca – Zalău – Oradea – Borș → Hungary | 596 / 203 | Bucharest – Ploiești (65.19 km), Râṣnov – Cristian (6.3 km), Târgu Mureș – Nădășelu (113.05 km), Nușfalău – Suplacu de Barcău (13.55 km) and Biharia – Borș (5.35 km) sectors are operational. Nădășelu – Mihăesti – Zimbor (30.06 km) and Zimbor – Poarta Sălajului (12.24 km) are under construction. The exits to DN73 at Cristian and DN15 at Târgu Mureș, while not part of A3, are built to expressway standards. |
| A 4 | Ovidiu – Agigea | 60 / 22 | Constanța bypass complete as motorway and in use. The northern end is planned to be extended to Tulcea along the Dobrogea express road (DEx8). A southern extension bypassing Techirghol is under feasibility studies. |
| A 5 | Bucharest – Giurgiu → Bulgaria | ~55 / 0 | Status unclear; "A5" originally used on Sibiu - Brașov (now part of the A13). |
| A 6 | Junction with A1 at Balinț – Drobeta-Turnu Severin – Craiova – Alexandria – Bucharest | 260 / 11 | Operational between the junction with A1 and the Lugoj bypass. Feasibility studies for Bucharest - Alexandria, Filiasi - Drobeta-Turnu Severin - Caransebeș - Lugoj sections have been tendered. |
| A 7 | Junction with A3 near Ploiești – Bacău – Suceava – Siret → Ukraine | 436 / 123 | Bacău bypass (16 km), Focșani bypass (10.94 km), A3 - Mizil (21 km) , Buzău - Focșani (82.44 km) and Mizil - Buzău (42.25 km) are operational, Focșani – Bacău (96.052 km) is partly operational, Săucești (Bacău) – Pașcani (77.38 km) are under construction. Pașcani - Suceava (61.97 km) is under auction. Suceava–Siret (58.991 km) is under feasibility studies. |
| A 8 | Junction with A3 near Târgu Mureș – Sovata – Târgu Neamț – Junction with A7 – Pașcani – Iași – Ungheni → Moldova | 318 / 0 | East-West motorway between Transylvania and Moldova initially estimated to be first open in 2009. Feasibility studies conducted in 2009–2011; Feasibility studies revision and update contracted in 2015. First contracts to be tendered in 2023, and first openings by 2026. Planned to be completed by 2030. |
| A 9 | Junction with A1 near Timișoara – Moravița → Serbia | 92 / 0 | Intended to connect Timișoara to Serbia's motorway network, with possible first tendered construction contracts in 2023. |
| A 10 | Junction with A1 near Sebeș – Alba Iulia – junction with A3 near Turda | 70 / 70 | Operational on the entire length since 2021. |
| A 11 DEx11 | Junction with A1 near Arad – Oradea – junction with A3 near Biharia | 118 / 3.5 | Only junction with A1 and DN1-A3 segments operational. The first expressway segment (Oradea bypass) opened in March 2024. Additional tendering planned for 2024. The Oradea West bypass (18.96 km) is operational, of which 16.035 km between Sântandrei - Biharia (A3) forms DEx16. |
| A 13 | Junction with A1 near Sibiu – Făgăraș – Brașov – Sfântu Gheorghe – Onești – junction with A7 near Răcăciuni | 281 / 0 | Mentioned in the 2014 Masterplan; intended as a link between southern Transylvania and Moldavia. First segments of the Sibiu-Brașov section were tendered in 2022; the other segments are in planning stages. |
| A 14 DEx14 | Junction with A7 near Botoșani – Suceava – Vatra Dornei – Bistrița – junction of A15 near Dej – Baia Mare – Satu Mare – Oar → Hungary | 436 / 9 | The Satu Mare bypass was opened to expressway standards in 2022, 8.672 km being part of DEx14. Feasibility studies being completed for Satu Mare–Oar section, with likely tendering in 2023. Feasibility studies for Suceava–Baia Mare–Satu Mare (390 km) are in early planning stages, likely to be mostly built as expressways. |

== Expressways ==
Planned expressways according to CNADNR (Romanian National Company of Motorways and National Roads):

| Expressway | Name | Route | Length (km) / in use (km) | Remarks |
|---|---|---|---|---|
| DEx1 | Bessarabia | Mărășești – Bârlad – Albița | 160 / 0 | Intended as a connection between Bucharest and Chișinău. Was a government priority around 2010, but was disfavored towards the A8 project, and unlikely to have built segments in the near future. |
| DEx4 | Someș | Petreștii de Jos – Cluj-Napoca – Gherla – Dej | 75 / 5 | First segment Petreștii de Jos - Tureni is open since 10 July 2025 |
| DEx6 | Danube | Junction with A4 near Brăila – Galați | 10.77 / 0 | Tendered in 2021; likely opening date in 2024. |
| DEx7 | Bukovina | Suceava - Siret | 55.7 / 0 | Undergoing feasibility studies. |
| DEx8 | Dobruja | Brăila - Tulcea - Constanța - Mangalia | 269.9 / 22.2 | Constanța bypass A4 (22.20 km) is operational. Brăila - Constanța (187.7 km) and Agigea - Vama Veche (60 km) sections are currently under design. |
| DEx11 | Crișana | Arad – Chișineu-Criș – Solonta – Oradea | 120.47 / 0 | Tendered in February 2024. |
| DEx12 | Oltenia | Pitești – Slatina – Craiova | 121 / 121 | The entire road was inaugurated on 31 July 2025. |
| DEx14 | Horea, Cloșca and Crișan | Satu Mare - Oar | 10.9 / 0 | Tendered in 2024. |
| DEx16 | Oradea Bypass | Oradea Ring Expressway - A3 | 12.9 / 12.9 | Length is 18.96 km, of which 12.9 km is express road and the rest a national road (DN1Y) with two lanes in each direction. Operational on the entire length since March 2024. |
| | Muntenia | Buzău – Făurei – Brăila | 98 / 0 | The triangle with A7 is closed by the Milcovia expressway. Undergoing feasibility studies. |
| | Milcovia | Brăila – Slobozia Ciorăști (Focșani) | 79 / 0 | The triangle with A7 is closed by the Muntenia expressway. Undergoing feasibility studies. |
| | Vlad Țepeș | Găești – Târgoviște – Ploiești | 76 / 0 | The triangle with A7 is closed with the DX18, named Milcovia highway. Undergoing feasibility studies. |
| | Valahia | Bucharest Ring Road – Târgoviște | 62.21 / 0 | Undergoing feasibility studies. |
| | Bistrița | Berești-Bistrița (Bacău) – Piatra Neamț | 52 / 0 | Undergoing feasibility studies. |
| | Avram Iancu | Românași – Jibou | 20 / 0 | CNAIR approved the signing of the partnership agreement with the Sălaj County Council for the realization of the technical documentation. |
| | Targu Jiu | Craiova – Filiași – Târgu Jiu | 58.597 / 0 | Undergoing feasibility studies. In March 2024 the government approved the technical-economic indicators for this expressway. |
| | Maramureș | Baia Mare – Satu Mare (bypass) | 55 / 0 | In the planning phase. |
| | Mihai Eminescu | Suceava – Botoșani | 26 / 0 | In the planning phase. |

== European routes ==
Total length of European routes in Romania at the end of 2019 is 6,176 km (3837.5 mi).

=== Class A ===
Map of European routes passing through Romania

- E58 — (Austria, Slovakia, Ukraine) – Halmeu – Dej – Bistrița – Suceava – Botoșani – Târgu Frumos – Iași – Sculeni – (Republic of Moldova, Ukraine, Russia)
- E60 — (France, Switzerland, Austria, Hungary) – Borș – Oradea – Cluj-Napoca – Turda – Târgu Mureș – Brașov – Ploiești – Bucharest – Urziceni – Slobozia – Constanța – (Georgia, Azerbaijan, Turkmenistan, Uzbekistan, Tajikistan, Kyrgyzstan, China)
- E68 — (Hungary) – Nădlac – Arad – Deva – Sebeș – Miercurea Sibiului – Sibiu – Brașov
- E70 — (Spain, France, Italy, Slovenia, Croatia, Serbia) – Timișoara – Drobeta-Turnu Severin – Craiova – Alexandria – Bucharest – Giurgiu – (Bulgaria, Turkey, Georgia)
- E79 — (Hungary) – Borș – Oradea – Beiuș – Deva – Petroșani – Târgu Jiu – Filiași – Craiova – Calafat – (Bulgaria, Greece)
- E81 — (Ukraine) – Halmeu – Livada – Satu Mare – Zalău – Cluj-Napoca – Turda – Sebeș – Miercurea Sibiului – Sibiu – Pitești – Bucharest – Constanța
- E85 — (Lithuania, Belarus, Ukraine) – Siret – Suceava – Roman – Bacău – Buzău – Urziceni – Bucharest – Giurgiu – (Bulgaria, Greece)
- E87 — (Ukraine) – Galați – Brăila – Tulcea – Constanța – Vama Veche – (Bulgaria, Turkey)

=== Class B ===
- E574 — Bacău – Onești – Târgu Secuiesc – Brașov – Pitești – Craiova
- E576 — Cluj-Napoca – Dej
- E577 — Ploiești – Buzău
- E578 — Sărățel – Reghin – Toplița – Gheorgheni – Miercurea Ciuc – Sfântu Gheorghe – Chichiș
- E581 — Mărășești – Tecuci – Bârlad – Huși – Albița – (Republic of Moldova, Ukraine)
- E583 — Săbăoani – Iași – Sculeni – (Republic of Moldova, Ukraine)
- E584 — (Ukraine, Republica Moldova) – Galați – Slobozia
- E671 — Timișoara – Arad – Oradea – Satu Mare
- E673 — Lugoj – Deva
- E675 — Constanța – Agigea – Negru Vodă – (Bulgaria)
- E771 — Drobeta-Turnu Severin – Porțile de Fier – (Serbia)

== National roads ==
National road network

Total length (including European routes and Highways) of National Roads in 2019 is 17,873 km (11105.77 mi), an increase from 17,272 km (10,732 mi) in 2015. The majority of National Roads (DN) are single carriageway, with only 12.5% being dual carriageway. A major problem being that many National Roads (drumuri naționale) have no ring roads around cities and towns, disrupting the traffic flow (i.e. making traffic condition more difficult).

In 2019 16,088 km (9,996 mi) of National Roads are asphalt concrete roads of heavy/medium type, 880 km (546.8 mi) concrete roads and 720 km (447 mi) of light asphalt road "clothing". 54.7% of heavy/medium roads and 79.4% of light asphalt roads have exceeded their "service life" and are in need of some form of repair or replacement.

Seven one-digit national roads start off in Bucharest in a radial pattern.

=== Trunk roads ===
| National Road | Route | Length (km) | European System |
|---|---|---|---|
| DN1 | Bucharest – Ploiești – Brașov – Făgăraș – Sibiu – Alba Iulia – Turda – Cluj-Napoca – Oradea – Borș –> Hungary | 642 | E60 (Bucharest – Brașov); E68 (Brașov – Veștem); E81 (Veștem – Cluj-Napoca); E60 (Cluj-Napoca – Borș) |
| DN2 | Bucharest – Urziceni – Buzău – Focșani – Bacău – Roman – Fălticeni – Suceava – Siret –> Ukraine | 446 | E85 (entire route) |
| DN3 | Bucharest – Fundulea – Lehliu Gară – Călărași – Ostrov – Murfatlar – Constanța | 260 | |
| DN4 | Bucharest – Popești-Leordeni – Budești – Oltenița | 72 | |
| DN5 | Bucharest – Giurgiu –> Bulgaria | 67 | E70 / E85 (entire route) |
| DN6 | Bucharest – Alexandria – Caracal – Craiova – Drobeta-Turnu Severin – Caransebeș – Lugoj – Timișoara – Sânnicolau Mare –> Hungary | 639 | E70 (Bucharest – Timișoara) |
| DN7 | Bucharest – Găești – Pitești – Râmnicu Vâlcea – Sibiu – Deva – Arad –> Hungary | 525 | E81 (Pitești – Veștem); E68 (Veștem – Nădlac) |
| DNCB | Bucharest ring road | 82 | E60 / E81 |
| DNCT | Timișoara ring road | 12 | |

=== Other national roads ===
| National Road | Route | Length (km) | European road | Remarks |
|---|---|---|---|---|
| DN1A | Bucharest – Buftea – Ploiești – Boldești-Scăeni – Vălenii de Munte – Săcele | 185 | E60 (Ploiești); E577 (Ploiești) |
| DN1B | Ploiești – Mizil – Buzău | 67 | E577 (entire route) |
| DN1C | Cluj-Napoca – Gherla – Dej – Șomcuta Mare – Baia Mare – Tăuții-Măgherăuș – Seini – Livada – Halmeu | 217 | E576 (Cluj-Napoca – Dej); E58 (Dej–Baia Mare–Halmeu) |
| DN1D | Albești-Paleologu – Urziceni | 42 |
| DN1E | Brașov – Poiana Brașov – Râșnov | 22 |
| DN1F | Cluj-Napoca – Zalău – Tășnad – Carei – Urziceni | 178 | E81 (Cluj-Napoca–Zalău–Supuru de Sus) |
| DN1G | Huedin – Zimbor – Tihău | 50 |
| DN1H | Aleșd – Nușfalău – Șimleu Silvaniei – Zalău – Jibou – Răstoci | 132 |
| DN1J | Căpușu Mare - Nădășelu; Cluj Nord bypass | 15 | | Formerly DJ104 |
| DN1K | Brasov bypass | 20 | E574 (entire route) |
| DN1L | Ciolpani (DN1L) – Lake Snagov | 5 | | Formerly DJ101M |
| DN1M | Snagov Palace (DJ111) – DN1L | 1 |
| DN1N | Cluj-Napoca – Pata | 16 | | Formerly DJ105S |
| DN1P | Uileacu de Criș – Brusturi – DN19E | 22 |
| DN1R | Huedin – Beliș – Albac | 80 | | Formerly DJ108 |
| DN1S | Șercaia (DN1) – Comăna de Jos – DN13 (Hoghiz) | 24 | | Formerly DJ104 |
| DN1T | Mirșid – Moigrad-Porolissum (tourist route) | 3 | | Formerly DJ106B |
| DN10 | Buzău – Pătârlagele – Nehoiu – Întorsura Buzăului – Hărman | 146 |
| DN11 | Brașov – Târgu Secuiesc – Onești – Bacău | 179 | E574 (entire route) |
| DN11A | Onești (DN11) – Adjud – DN2 – Podu Turcului – Bârlad (DN24) | 91 |
| DN11B | Târgu Secuiesc – Sânzieni– Cozmeni | 40 |
| DN11C | Târgu Secuiesc - Turia - Băile Balvanyos - Bixad | 39 |
| DN12 | Chichiș – Sfântu Gheorghe – Băile Tușnad – Miercurea Ciuc – Gheorghieni – Toplița | 164 | E578 (entire route) |
| DN12A | Miercurea Ciuc – Comănești – Dărmănești – Târgu Ocna – Onești | 116 |
| DN12B | Târgu Ocna – Slănic-Moldova | 22 |
| DN12C | Gheorgheni – Lacu Roșu – Bicaz | 57 |
| DN12D | St. Stephen the Great Street, Comănești | 0.5 |
| DN13 | Brașov – Rupea – Sighișoara – Târgu Mureș | 165 | E60 (entire route) |
| DN13A | Bălăușeri – Sângeorgiu de Pădure – Sovata – Odorheiu Secuiesc – Vlăhița – Miercurea-Ciuc | 131 |
| DN13B | Praid – Gheorgheni | 51 |
| DN13C | Vânători – Cristuru Secuiesc – Bisericani | 31 |
| DN13D | Sovata – Săcădat | 0 | | Downgraded to DJ153 |
| DN13E | Feldioara – Sfântu Gheorghe – Covasna – Întorsura Buzăului | 89 |
| DN14 | Sibiu – Copșa Mică – Mediaș – Dumbrăveni – Sighișoara | 90 |
| DN14A | Mediaș – Târnăveni – Iernut | 42 |
| DN14B | Teiuș – Blaj – Copșa Mică | 56 |
| DN15 | Turda – Câmpia Turzii – Luduș – Iernut – Ungheni – Târgu Mureș – Reghin – Toplița – Borsec – Poiana Largului – Bicaz – Piatra Neamț – Roznov – Buhuși – Bacău | 369 | E60 (Turda–Târgu Mureș); E578 (Reghin–Toplița) |
| DN15A | Breaza – Sărățel | 47 | E578 (entire route) |
| DN15B | Poiana Largului – Târgu Neamț – Cristești | 62 |
| DN15C | Piatra Neamț – Târgu Neamț – Vadu Moldovei | 60 |
| DN15D | Piatra Neamț – Roman – Negrești – Vaslui | 120 |
| DN15E | Târgu Mureș – Ceuașu de Câmpie – Satu Nou | 45 |
| DN15F | Săcălușești – Agapia – Agapia Monastery (tourist route) | 7 |
| DN15G | Bălțătești – Văratec Monastery (tourist route) | 4 |
| DN16 | Apahida – Silivașu de Câmpie – Reghin | 105 |
| DN17 | Dej – Beclean – Bistrița – Vatra Dornei – Câmpulung Moldovenesc – Frasin – Gura Humorului – Suceava | 252 | E58 (entire route) |
| DN17A | Câmpulung Moldovenesc – Vatra Moldoviței – Suceava – Rădăuți – Siret | 93 |
| DN17B | Vatra Dornei – Broșteni – Poiana Teiului | 87 |
| DN17C | Bistrița – Năsăud – Moisei | 86 |
| DN17D | Beclean – Năsăud – Sângeorz Băi – Cârlibaba | 98 |
| DN18 | Baia Mare – Baia Sprie – Sighetu Marmației – Vișeu de Sus – Borșa – Cârlibaba – Iacobeni | 220 |
| DN18A | Borșa – Băile Borșa (tourist route) | 1 |
| DN18B | Baia Mare – Târgu Lăpuș – Cășeiu | 56 |
| DN19 | Oradea – Săcueni – Valea lui Mihai – Carei – Satu Mare – Livada – Negrești-Oaș – Sighetu Marmației | 234 | E671 (Oradea–Satu Mare); E81 (Satu Mare–Livada) |
| DN19A | Supuru de Jos – Ardud – Satu Mare – Dorolț | 62 | E81 (Supuru de Jos–Satu Mare) |
| DN19B | Săcueni – Marghita – Nușfalău | 54 |
| DN19C | Valea lui Mihai – Valea lui Mihai | 9 |
| DN19D | Săcueni – Săcueni | 10 |
| DN19E | Biharia - Sălard - Chiribiș | 39 |
| DN19F | Satu Mare - Odoreu - Apa | 26 |
| DN2A | Urziceni – Căzănești – Slobozia – Țăndărei – Hârșova – Ovidiu – Constanța | 205 |
| DN2B | Spătaru – Buzău – Făurei – Ianca – Brăila – Șendreni – Galați – Galați | 150 | E87 / E584 (Brăila–Galați) |
| DN2C | Buzău – Pogoanele – Amara – Slobozia | 82 |
| DN2D | Focșani – Tulnici – Târgu Secuiesc | 117 |
| DN2E | Fălticeni – Păltinoasa – Solca – Vicovu de Jos – Vicovu de Sus | 88 |
| DN2F | Bacău – Plopana – Vaslui | 81 |
| DN2G | Bacău – Moinești – Comănești | 55 |
| DN2H | Românești – Milișăuți – Rădăuți – Vicovu de Jos – Putna | 40 |
| DN2K | Milișăuți – Arbore – Solca | 17 |
| DN2L | Tișita (DN2) – Panciu – Răcoasa – Soveja – Tulnici | 77 |
| DN2M | Focșani – Odobești – Andreiașu de Jos | 52 |
| DN2N | Mărtinești – Bozga – Dumbrăveni – Jitia | 56 |
| DN2R | Jitia – Vintileasca – Neculele – Bahnele | 11 |
| DN2S | Brăila (DN2B) – Brăila Bridge – Jijila (DN22) | 19 |
| DN2AH | Hârșova urban area | 2 |
| DN21 | Brăila (DN2B) – Bărăganul – Slobozia – Călărași (DN3B) | 132 | E584 (Brăila–Slobozia) |
| DN21A | Bărăganul (DN21) – Țăndărei (DN2A) | 23 |
| DN21B | DN21 – Călărași – DN3D | 4 |
| DN22 | Râmnicu Sărat – Brăila – Măcin – Isaccea – Tulcea – Babadag – Constanța | 286 | E87 (Brăila–Constanța) |
| DN22A | DN22 – Cataloi – Topolog – Hârșova (DN2A) | 86 |
| DN22B | Brăila – Galați | 15 |
| DN22C | Cernavodă (A2) – Medgidia – Murfatlar (DN3) | 43 |
| DN22D | Măcin (DN22) – Horia – Cicurova – Caugagia – DN22 | 78 |
| DN22E | Garvăn (DN22) – ferry crossing over the Danube – Galați | 14 |
| DN22F | Horia (DN22D) – Nalbant (DN22A) | 14 |
| DN22G | Tulcea – DN22 – Barajului Street, Tulcea – DN22 | 3 |
| DN23 | Focșani – Mândrești – Vulturu – Măicănești – Gulianca – Muchea – Brăila municipality | 89 |
| DN23A | (DN23) Milcovul – Mărtinești – Mihălceni – Ciorăști (DN23B) | 34 |
| DN23B | Măicănești – Ciorăști – Codrești – Buzău County border | 34 |
| DN24 | DN2 (Tișița) – Tecuci – Bârlad – Vaslui – Iași – Sculeni –> Moldova | 220 | E581 (Tișița–Crasna); E58 / E583 (Iași–Sculeni) |
| DN24A | DN24 (Bârlad) – Murgeni – Fălciu – Stănilești – Huși | 100 |
| DN24B | Crasna (DN24) – Huși – Albița –> Moldova | 49 | E581 (entire route) |
| DN24C | Vânători (DN24) – Stefănești – Manoleasa - Manoleasa Prut – Rădăuți Prut (DN29A) | 142 |
| DN24D | Bârlad – Trestiana - Grivița – Bălăbănești – Bursucani – Crăiești – Vârlezi – Cuca – (DN26) | 85 |
| DN25 | Tecuci (DN24) – Hanu Conachi – Șendreni (DN2B) | 68 |
| DN25A | Hanu Conachi (DN25) – Fundeni – Lungoci – Nănești | 7 |
| DN26 | Galați (DN2B) – Oancea – Gănești – Murgeni (DN24A) | 95 |
| DN26A | Oancea (DN26) –> Moldova | 0.6 |
| DN28 | DN2 (Săbăoani) – Târgu Frumos – Iași – Răducaneni – Gorban – DN24B (Albița) | 141 | E58 (Târgu Frumos–Iași); E583 (Săbăoani–Iași) |
| DN28A | Târgu Frumos (DN28) – Pașcani – Moțca (DN28) | 38 |
| DN28B | Târgu Frumos (DN28) – Hârlău – Botoșani (DN29) | 78 | E58 (entire route) |
| DN28D | Iași bypass | 14 |
| DN29 | Suceava (DN2) – Botoșani – Săveni – Manoleasa – DN24C (Manoleasa Prut) | 99 | E58 (Suceava–Botoșani) |
| DN29A | Suceava (DN29) – Vârfu Câmpului – Dorohoi – Darabani – Rădăuți Prut – Moldovan border | 100 |
| DN29B | Botoșani (DN29) – Dorohoi (DN29) | 32 |
| DN29C | DN29B – Cucorăni – Vârfu Câmpului – DN2 (Siret) | 46 |
| DN29D | Botoșani – Trușești – Ștefănești (DN24C) –> Moldova | 48 |
| DN29E | Stânca (DN24C) –> Moldova | 4 |
| DN29F | DJ291 – DJ298 | 18 |
| DN3A | Lehliu Gară (DN3) – Dor Mărunt – Dragoș Vodă – Fetești (DN3B) | 79 |
| DN3B | Călărași (DN3) – Fetești – Lunca – DN2A | 98 |
| DN3C | DN3 – Aurel Vlaicu Boulevard, Ovidiu – Ovidiu (DN2A) | 12 |
| DN3D | DN3 – București Street Extension, Călărași – București Street, Călărași | 6 |
| DN3F | Constanța – Filimon Sârbu Passage | 0.4 |
| DN31 | DN3 (Călărași) – Oltenița (DN4) | 60 |
| DN31A | DN31 – Oltenița (DN4) | 3 |
| DN38 | Agigea (DN39) – Techirghiol – Movilița – Topraisar – Negru Vodă –> Bulgaria | 54 | E675 (entire route) |
| DN39 | Constanța (DN3) – Eforie Nord – Eforie Sud – Mangalia – Vama Veche –> Bulgaria | 54 | E60 (Constanța–Eforie); E87 (entire route) | Four-lane road. |
| DN39A | Eforie Nord (DN39) – Portul Constanța Sud – Agigea | 3 | E60 (entire route) |
| DN39B | DN39 – Olimp | 4 |
| DN39C | DN39 – Neptun | 2 |
| DN39D | DN39 – Jupiter | 2 |
| DN39E | Constanța (DN39) – Cumpăna | 6 | | Formerly a portion of DN38 |
| DN41 | Oltenița (DN4) – DN5 (Daia) | 64 |
| DN41A | DN4 – Oltenița (DN31A) | 0.6 |
| DN5A | Adunații-Copăceni (DN5) – Grădiștea – Mironești – Greaca (DN41) | 34 |
| DN5B | Giurgiu (DN5) – Ghimpați (DN6) | 39 |
| DN5C | Giurgiu (DN5B) – Zimnicea (DN51) | 59 |
| DN51 | Alexandria (DN6) – Zimnicea Port | 43 |
| DN51A | Zimnicea (DN51) – Turnu Măgurele (DN52) | 56 |
| DN52 | Alexandria (DN6) – Turnu Măgurele Port -> Bulgaria | 54 |
| DN54 | Caracal (DN6) – Corabia – Turnu Măgurele (DN52) | 71 |
| DN54A | Corabia (DN54) – Bechet (DN55) | 44 |
| DN55 | Craiova (DN6) – Bechet | 71 |
| DN55A | Bechet (DN55) – Calafat (DN56D) | 95 |
| DN56 | Craiova – Calafat Bridge –> Bulgaria | 85 | E79 (entire route) |
| DN56A | Maglavit (DN56) – Vânju Mare – Șimian (DN6) | 79 |
| DN56B | Hinova (DN56A) – Iron Gate II Hydroelectric Power Station | 31 |
| DN56C | Salcia (DN56A) – Gruia – Balta Verde – Burila Mică – Bistrețu | 60 |
| DN56D | DN56 – Calafat Port (Bac) | 4 |
| DN57 | Orșova (DN6) – Moldova Nouă – Oravița – Moravița (DN59) | 201 |
| DN57A | Pojejena (DN57) – Socol | 26 |
| DN57B | Oravița (DN57) – Bozovici – Iablanița – DN6 | 97 |
| DN57C | DN57 – Serbian border (PTF Naidăș) | 97 |
| DN58 | Caransebeș (DN6) – Reșița – Anina (DN57B) | 83 |
| DN58A | Lugoj (DN6) – Fârliug – Ezeriș – Soceni (DN58) | 41 |
| DN58B | Reșița (DN58) – Bocșa – Voiteg (DN59) | 66 |
| DN59 | Timișoara (DN6) – Deta – Moravița – Serbian border | 64 | E70 (entire route) |
| DN59A | Timișoara (DN6) – Jimbolia – Serbian border | 48 |
| DN59B | Cărpiniș (DN59A) – Uivar – Deta (DN59) | 75 |
| DN59C | Jimbolia (DN59A) – Teremia Mare – Sânnicolau Mare (DN6) | 41 |
| DN59D | DN59B – Foeni – Serbian border | 4 |
| DN59E | DN59C – Lunga – Serbian border | 3 |
| DN59F | DN59C – Dudeștii Vechi – Vălcani – Serbian border | 22 |
| DN59G | Dudeștii Vechi (DN59F) - Beba Veche - Hungarian border | 24 | | The most recently added national road of Romania |
| DN6A | DN6 – Iron Gate I Hydroelectric Power Station –> Serbia | 1 | E771 (entire route) |
| DN6B | Craiova – Hurezani | 57 |
| DN6C | Alexandria – Poroschia | 5 |
| DN6D | DNCB – Bragadiru – Domnești (DJ602) | 3 |
| DN6F | DN6 - Alexandria - DN6 | 13 |
| DN61 | Ghimpați (DN6) – Clejani – Corbii Mari – Găești (DN7) | 79 |
| DN64 | Caracal (DN6) – Drăgășani | 135 | | Partially four-lane road. |
| DN64A | Râmnicu Vâlcea – Băile Olănești | 19 |
| DN65 | Craiova (DN6) – Balș – Slatina – Pitești (DN7) | 122 | E574 (entire route) |
| DN65A | DN65 – Costești – Roșiorii de Vede – Turnu Măgurele (DN52) | 124 | E70 (Roșiorii de Vede, overlap with DN6) |
| DN65B | A1 (Pitești) – DN65 (Pitești); Pitești southern ring road | 7 |
| DN65C | Craiova (DN65) – Bălcești – Horezu (DN67) | 111 |
| DN65D | Albota – Bascov | 10 |
| DN65E | Roșiorii de Vede – Bogdana – Furculești – Piatra (DN51A) | 40 |
| DN65F | Craiova (DN65 – DN65C – DN6B – DN6); Craiova northern ring road | 14 |
| DN66 | Simeria – Hațeg – Petroșani – Târgu Jiu – Filiași | 211 | E79 (entire route) |
| DN66A | Iscroni (DN66) – Vulcan – Lupeni – Câmpu lui Neag – Pasul Jiu – Cerna – Valea lui Iovan – Contur Lac – Cerna Sat – intersection with DN67D | 105 |
| DN67 | Drobeta-Turnu Severin (DN6) – Târgu Jiu – Horezu – Râmnicu Vâlcea (Varianta Sud) – Goranu (DN7) | 197 |
| DN67A | DN67 – Broșteni – Strehaia (DN6) | 24 |
| DN67B | Scoarța (DN67) – Târgu Cărbunești – Hurezani – Drăgășani – Pitești (DN7) | 189 |
| DN67C | DN67 (Bengești) – Novaci – Șugag – Sebeș (DN1) | 148 | | Also known as the Transalpina. |
| DN67D | Târgu Jiu (DN67) – Baia de Aramă – Băile Herculane – DN6 | 108 |
| DN68 | Caransebeș (DN6) – Hațeg (DN66) | 71 |
| DN68A | Lugoj (DN6) – Făget – Ilia (DN7) | 79 | E673 (entire route) |
| DN68B | Deva – Hunedoara | 12 |
| DN69 | Timișoara (DN6) – Arad | 46 | E671 (entire route) |
| DN7A | Brezoi (DN7) – Voineasa – Obârșia Lotrului – Petroșani (DN66) | 108 |
| DN7B | Sederhat (DN7) – Turnu – PTF Turnu –> Hungary | 10 |
| DN7C | Bascov (DN7) – Curtea de Argeș – Bâlea Lac – Bâlea Cascadă – Cârțișoara – DN1 (Arpașu de Jos) | 90 | | Also known as the Transfăgărășan. |
| DN7D | Câineni – Curtea de Argeș | 61 |
| DN7E | DN7 – DN7 (Arad) | 7 | | Formerly DN7 |
| DN7G | A1 – DN7 (Nădlac) | 7 |
| DN7H | Sibiu bypass | 3 |
| DN7CC | Călimănești ring road | 8 |
| DN71 | DN7 – Bâldana – Târgoviște – Pucioasa – Sinaia (DN1) | 110 |
| DN72 | Găești (DN7) – Târgoviște – Ploiești (DN1) | 76 |
| DN72A | Târgoviște (DN72) – Voinești – DN73 (Valea Mare) | 62 |
| DN73 | Pitești (DN7) – Câmpulung Muscel – Râșnov – Cristian – Brașov (DN1) | 133 | E574 (entire route) |
| DN73A | Predeal (DN1) – Râșnov – Zărnești – Șercaia (DN1) | 68 | E574 (Râșnov, overlap with DN73) |
| DN73B | Cristian (DN73) – Ghimbav (DN71) | 5 |
| DN73C | DN73 (Schitu Golești) – Curtea de Argeș – Blidari – DN7 | 70 |
| DN73D | Argeșelu (DN73) – Mioveni – Boteni – Colnic (DN72A) | 49 |
| DN73E | DN73 – Mioveni (DN73D) | 3 |
| DN73F | DN73 – Moieciu de Jos – Cheia – Moieciu de Sus | 8 |
| DN74 | Brad (DN76) – Abrud – Zlatna – Alba Iulia (DN1) | 105 |
| DN74A | Abrud (DN74) – DN75 (Câmpeni) | 11 |
| DN75 | Lunca (DN76) – Câmpeni – Turda (DN1) | 160 |
| DN76 | DN7 (Deva) – Șoimuș – Brad – Beiuș – Oradea (DN1) | 181 | E79 (entire route) |
| DN79 | Arad – Chișineu Criș – Salonta – Oradea (DN1) | 113 | E671 (entire route) |
| DN79A | Vârfurile (DN76) – Ineu – Chișineu Criș – Vărșand –> Hungary | 127 |
| DN79B | Salonta (DN79) – Hungarian border | 14 |
| DN79C | Salonta (DN79) – Tinca – Beiuș (DN76) | 71 | | Formerly DJ795 |

== County and local roads ==
At the end of 2019 there are 35,083 km (21,799 mi) of county roads and 33,435 km (20,775 mi) of local roads.

=== County roads ===
At the end of 2019, out of the 35,083 km: 13,810 km (39.4%) are asphalt concrete roads of heavy/medium type, 13,227 km (37.7%) light asphalt road "clothing", 956 km (2.7%) concrete roads, 5,310 km (15%) cobblestone roads and 1,706 km (4.8%) dirt roads. Regarding the technical condition, 23% of asphalt concrete roads of heavy/medium type and 48% of light asphalt roads have exceeded their "service life" and are in need of some form of repair or replacement.

=== Local roads ===
At the end of 2019, out of the 33,435 km: 7,418 km (22.1%) are light asphalt road "clothing", 5,506 km (16.5%) asphalt concrete roads of heavy/medium type, 810 km (2.4%) concrete roads, 12,377 km (37%) cobblestone roads and 7,305 km (21.8%) dirt roads. Regarding technical condition, 31% of light asphalt roads and 10% of asphalt concrete roads of heavy/medium type have exceeded their "service life" and are in need of some form of repair or replacement.

== See also ==
- Transport in Romania
- Transport in Bucharest
