= European route E60 =

Second-longest road in the International E-road network

E60

Route information
- Length: 8,200 km (5,100 mi)

Major junctions
- West end: Brest, France
- East end: Irkeshtam Pass, China-Kyrgyzstan

Location
- Countries: France; Switzerland; Germany; Austria; Hungary; Romania; Georgia; Azerbaijan; Turkmenistan; Uzbekistan; Tajikistan; Kyrgyzstan; China

Highway system
- International E-road network; A Class; B Class

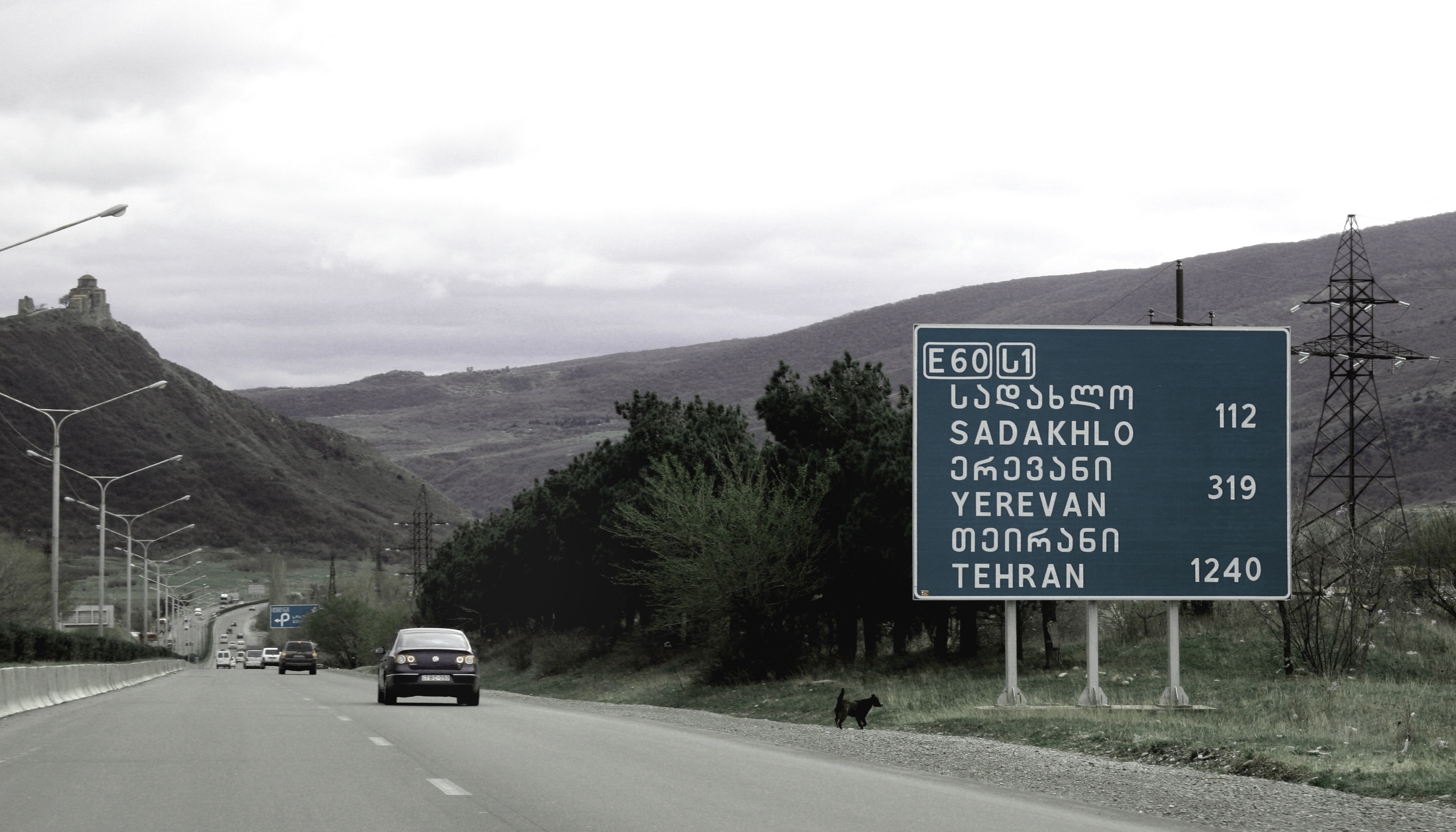
E60 road sign in Georgia

European route E 60 is the second-longest road in the International E-road network and runs 8,200 km (5,100 mi), from Brest, France (on the Atlantic coast), to Irkeshtam, Kyrgyzstan (on the border with China).

== Route ==
- France
  - N 265: Brest (E 50)
  - N 165: Brest - Quimper - Nantes (E 3)
  - A 844: Nantes (E 3 / E 62)
  - A 11: Nantes (E 62) - Angers (E 501)
  - A 85: Angers (E 501) - Tours (E 5)
  - A 10: Tours (E 502 / E 604, Start of Concurrency with E 5) - Orléans (E 9, End of Concurrency with E 5)
  - A 19: Orléans (E 5) - Courtenay (E 511, Start of Concurrency with E 15)
  - A 6: Courtenay (E 15 / E 511) - Auxerre - Beaune (End of Concurrency with E 15)
  - A 31: Beaune
  - A 36: Beaune (E 15 / E 17 / E 21) - Besançon (E 23) - Belfort (E 27) - Mulhouse (E 54)
  - A 35: Mulhouse (E 54, Start of Concurrency with E 25) - Saint-Louis
- Switzerland
  - A 3: Basel (E 35, End of Concurrency with E 25) - Baden
  - A 1 / A 3: Baden - Zürich (Start of Concurrency with E 41)
  - A 1 / A 4: Zürich (E 41) - Winterthur (End of Concurrency with E 41)
  - A 1: Winterthur (E 41) - St. Margrethen (E 43)
  - H7: St. Margrethen (Start of Concurrency with E 43)
- Austria
  - B 202: Höchst - Bregenz (E43)
  - A 14: Bregenz (End of Concurrency with E43) - Feldkirch - Bludenz
  - S 16: Bludenz - Landeck
  - A 12: Landeck - Innsbruck (E533, Start of Concurrency with E45) - Wörgl (E641) - Kufstein
- Germany
  - A 93: Kiefersfelden - Rosenheim (E 52, End of Concurrency with E 45)
  - A 8: Rosenheim (E 45, Start of Concurrency with E 52) - Bad Reichenhall (E 641)
- Austria
  - A 1: Salzburg (End of Concurrency with E52, Start of Cocurrency with E55) - Sattledt (E56 / E57) - Linz (E552, End of concurrency with E55) - Altlengbach
  - A 21: Altlengbach - Wien (E59)
  - S 1: Wien (E58 / E59, Towards E49 / E461)
  - A 4: Wien (Start of Concurrency with E58) - Bruck an der Leitha (End of Concurrency with E58) - Nickelsdorf
- Hungary
  - M1: Hegyeshalom - Mosonmagyaróvár (End of Concurrency with E65, Start of Concurrency with E75) - Budapest
  - M0: Budapest (E71 / E73 / End of Concurrency with E75)
  - M4: Budapest - Törökszentmiklós
  - 4: Törökszentmiklós - Püspökladány
  - 42: Püspökladány - Berettyóújfalu
  - M4: Berettyóújfalu (Start of Concurrency with E79) - Nagykereki
- Romania
  - DN1: Borș - Oradea (E671, End of Concurrency with E79) - Cluj-Napoca (E81 / E576)
  - DN15: Cluj-Napoca (E576, Start of Concurrency with E81) - Turda (End of Concurrency with E81) - Târgu Mureș
  - DN13: Târgu Mureș - Brașov (E68 / E574)
  - DN1: Brașov (E68 / E574) - Ploiești (E577) - Bucharest
  - DNCB: Bucharest (E85)
  - DN2: Bucharest (Start of Concurrency with E85) - Urziceni (End of Concurrency with E85)
  - DN2A: Urziceni (E85) - Slobozia (E584) - Ovidiu (E87) - Constanţa (E81 / E87)
- Gap (Black Sea)
  - (Romania) Constanţa - (Georgia (country)) Poti; ferry link
- Georgia
  - ს 2: Poti (E97) - Senaki (E97)
  - ს 1: Senaki (E97) - Samtredia (E692)
  - ს 1: Samtredia - Tbilisi (E117)
  - ს 9: Tbilisi (Start of Concurrency with E117) - Rustavi (End of Concurrency with E117)
  - ს 4: Rustavi - Tsiteli Khidi
- Azerbaijan
  - M2: Qırmızı Körpü - Qazax - Ganja - Yevlax - Hajiqabul (E002) - Ələt (E119) - Baku
- Gap (Caspian Sea)
  - (Azerbaijan) Baku - (Turkmenistan) Türkmenbaşy; ferry link
- Turkmenistan
  - M37 M37: Türkmenbaşy (Start of Concurrency with E121) - Balkanabat - Serdar (End of concurrency with E121) - Ashgabat (E003) - Tejen - Mary - Türkmenabat
- Uzbekistan
  - M37 M37 Road: Olot - Bukhara
  - A380 A380 Road: Bukhara - Qarshi - G‘uzor (E005)
  - M39 M39 Road: G‘uzor (E005) - Sherobod - Termez
  - M41 M41 Road: Termez (Towards Afghanistan) - Denov
- Tajikistan
  - РБ02 РБ02 Road: Tursunzoda - Dushanbe (E123)
  - РБ04 РБ04 Road: Dushanbe - Vahdat
  - РБ07 РБ07 Road: Vahdat - Obi Garm - Jirgatol - Border of Kyrgyzstan
- Kyrgyzstan
  - ЭМ-06 ЭМ-06 Road: Border of Tajikistan - Karamyk - Sary-Tash
  - ЭМ-05 ЭМ-05 Road: Sary-Tash - Irkeshtam - Border of China
- China
  - G3013: Irkeshtam
