= Loturi =

Loturi may refer to several villages in Romania:

- Loturi, a village in Schitu Golești Commune, Argeș County
- Loturi, a village in Manoleasa Commune, Botoșani County
