= Bărăganul =

- Commune
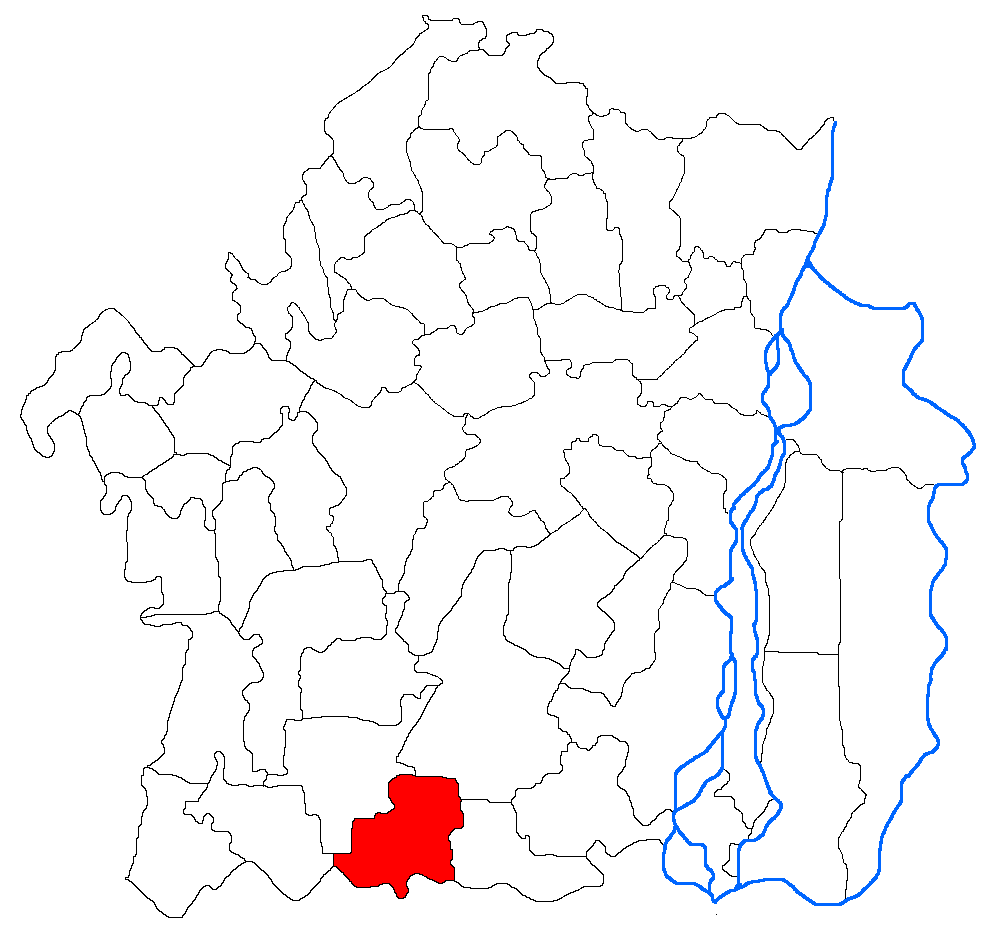
- Location in Brăila County

- Location in Romania
- Coordinates: 44°48′39″N 27°30′55″E
- Country: Romania
- County: Brăila

Government
  - Mayor (2020–2024): Daniel-Mihail Sandu (PSD)
- Area: 72.83 km^{2} (28.12 sq mi)
- Elevation: 35 m (115 ft)
- Population (2021-12-01): 2,864
  - Density: 39.32/km^{2} (101.8/sq mi)
- Time zone: UTC+02:00 (EET)
  - Summer (DST): UTC+03:00 (EEST)
- Postal code: 817005
- Area code: +(40) x39
- Vehicle reg.: BR
- Website: www.primariabaraganul.ro

Bărăganul is a commune located in Brăila County, Muntenia, Romania. It is composed of a single village, Bărăganul.

The commune is situated on the Bărăgan Plain, at an altitude of 35 m (115 ft). It is located in the southern of the county, 63 km (39 mi) southwest of the county seat, Brăila, on the border with Ialomița County.

Bărăganul is crossed by national road DN21, which starts in Brăila and ends in Călărași, 74 km (46 mi) to the south of the commune. Road DN21A branches off in Bărăganul, connecting it to the town of Țăndărei, Ialomița County, about 24 km (15 mi) to the southeast.
