= E576 =

E576 or E-576 may be:

- Sodium gluconate, a sequestrant
- European route E576, a European route class B road connecting the Romanian cities of Dej and Cluj-Napoca
