= Centura București =

Road in Romania

Bucharest Ring Road
- Centura București

Route information
- Part of E60 / E81
- Maintained by Compania Națională de Autostrăzi și Drumuri Naționale din România
- Length: 72 km (45 mi)

Major junctions
- Beltway around Bucharest

Location
- Country: Romania
- Counties: Municipality of Bucharest, Ilfov
- Major cities: Bucharest, Chitila, Otopeni, Voluntari

Highway system
- Roads in Romania; Highways

Centura București (English: Bucharest Beltway, Bucharest Ring Road), sometimes referred to as the DNCB, is a national-class road in Romania, circling the capital city of Bucharest. It is not to be mistaken with the partially opened Bucharest Ring Motorway (Romanian: Autostrada Centura București), which encircles the city at a further distance.

== Sections ==
It is divided into two major sections, the northern section and the southern section. The northern section has been widened to four lanes in 2010, between the Chitila (DN7) and the Voluntari (DN2) junctions, and a cable-stayed bridge was opened along the ring road in April 2011, in the Otopeni area, which overpasses the railway ring (built by a joint-venture of the Spanish company FCC and the Austrian company Alpine).

It is planned to be further upgraded, in both the northern, and the southern sections, with construction contracts awarded in 2012 and 2009 respectively. In the northern section, works have started in October 2013 for further widening to four lanes the segments between the DN7 and the A1 junctions, and between the DN2 and the A2 junctions.

The contract for the section between the DN2 and the A2 junctions was terminated (at 7% completion status) in February 2015, as the construction company became insolvent (the Romanian company Tehnologica Radion), and, although it was later awarded again in February 2018 to a joint-venture led by the Chinese company Sinohydro, this result was challenged and rejected, the final decision still pending to be given.

The section between the DN7 and the A1 junctions (built by a joint-venture led by the Romanian company Delta ACM 93) was opened to traffic on four lanes in September and October 2017, but with reportedly incomplete works.
