= DN1 =

Road in Romania

National Road 1
- Drumul Național 1

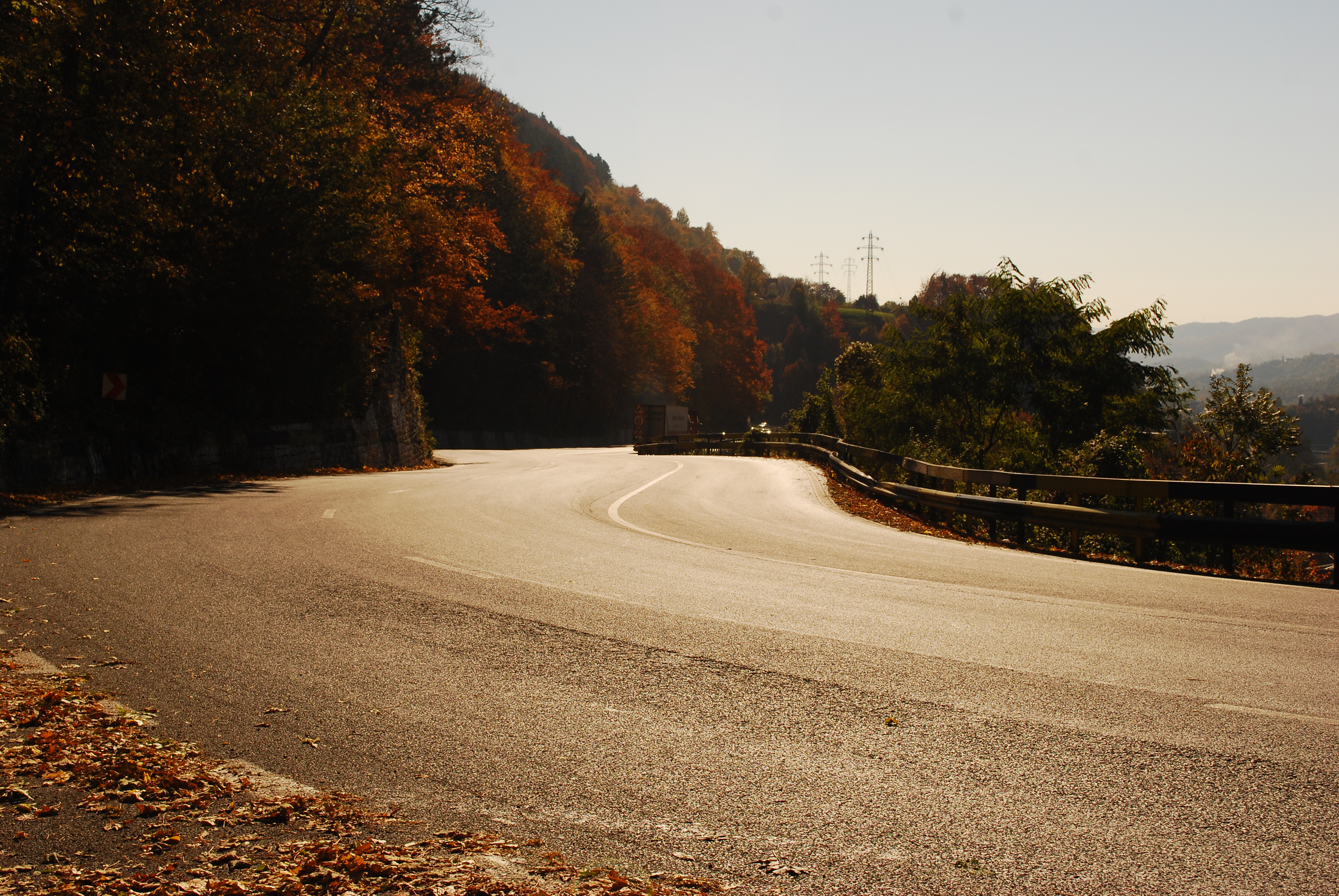

Route information
- Part of E60 / E68 / E81
- Maintained by Compania Națională de Autostrăzi și Drumuri Naționale din România
- Length: 643 km (400 mi)

Major junctions
- From: Bucharest
- To: Borș (Hungarian border)

Location
- Country: Romania
- Counties: Ilfov, Prahova, Brașov, Sibiu, Alba, Cluj, Bihor
- Major cities: Bucharest, Ploiești, Brașov, Făgăraș, Sibiu, Sebeș, Alba Iulia, Aiud, Turda, Cluj-Napoca, Oradea, Borș

Highway system
- Roads in Romania; Highways

DN1 (Romanian: Drumul Național 1) is an important national road in Romania which links Bucharest with the northwestern part of the country and the border with Hungary via Borș. The main cities linked by DN1 are Bucharest, Ploiești, Brașov, Sibiu, Alba Iulia, Cluj-Napoca and Oradea.

On the Comarnic – Brașov section, traffic jams appear very often because of intense traffic volume going in the touristic region of Valea Prahovei (Prahova Valley) and the road narrowing to only two lanes.

The segment of DN1 that serves the area north of Bucharest was upgraded at the end of 2005. It now has three traffic lanes on each side and two new interchanges at the Henri Coandă Airport and the Otopeni bridge. Although it doesn't complete the motorway specifications, the DN1 road can be considered an expressway on certain segments. A modern CCTV system has also been installed on the section from Bucharest to Sinaia to prevent speeding and accidents. The section from Bucharest to Comarnic is an undivided dual carriageway.

On the Bucharest – Brașov section, driving restrictions apply during daytime from Monday to Friday for vehicles with MPW over 7.5 t (16,535 lb) and on Saturdays and Sundays for vehicles with MPW over 3.5 t (7,716 lb). On the Cluj-Napoca – Oradea section, restrictions apply during daytime on Saturdays and Sundays for vehicles with MPW over 7.5 t (16,535 lb).

The partially built A3 motorway will carry the traffic off from DN1 upon completion, shortening the route by 59 km (37 mi).

== See also ==
- Roads in Romania
- Transport in Romania

=== Ramifications ===
- DN1A
- DN1B

== Gallery ==
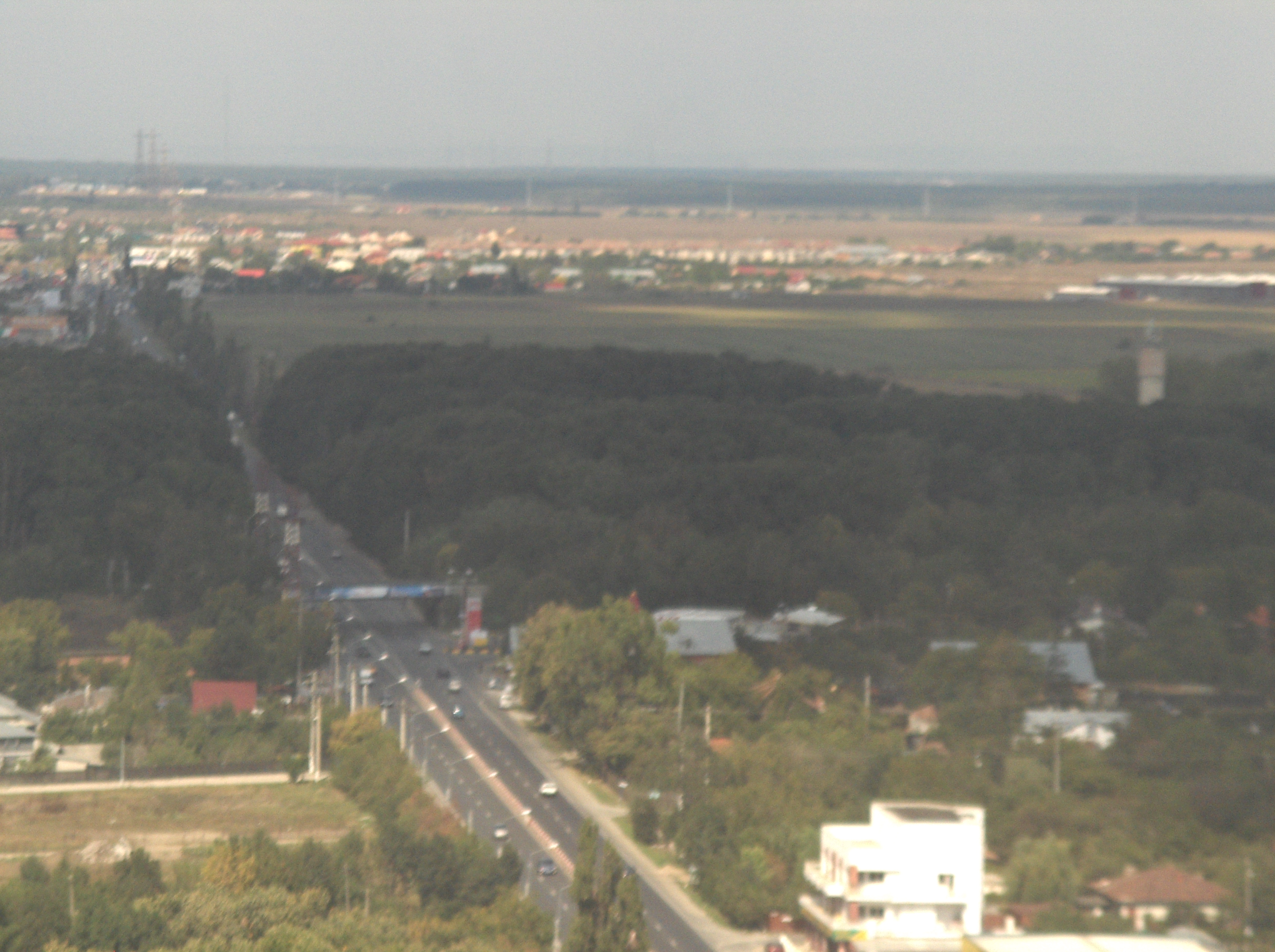
Aerial view of DN1, in Ilfov County, north of Otopeni

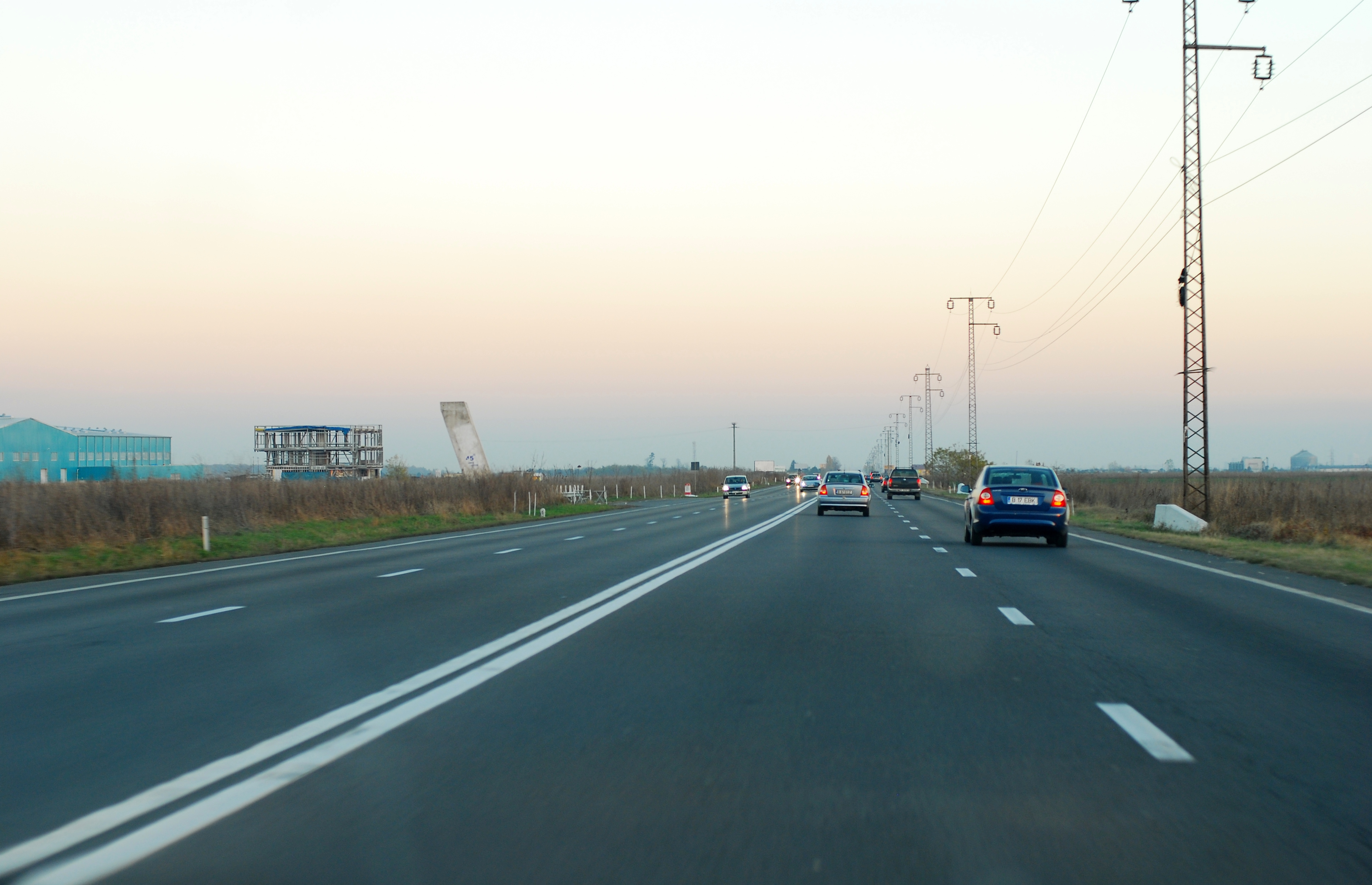
DN1 at the 45 degrees of latitude marker, in Prahova County

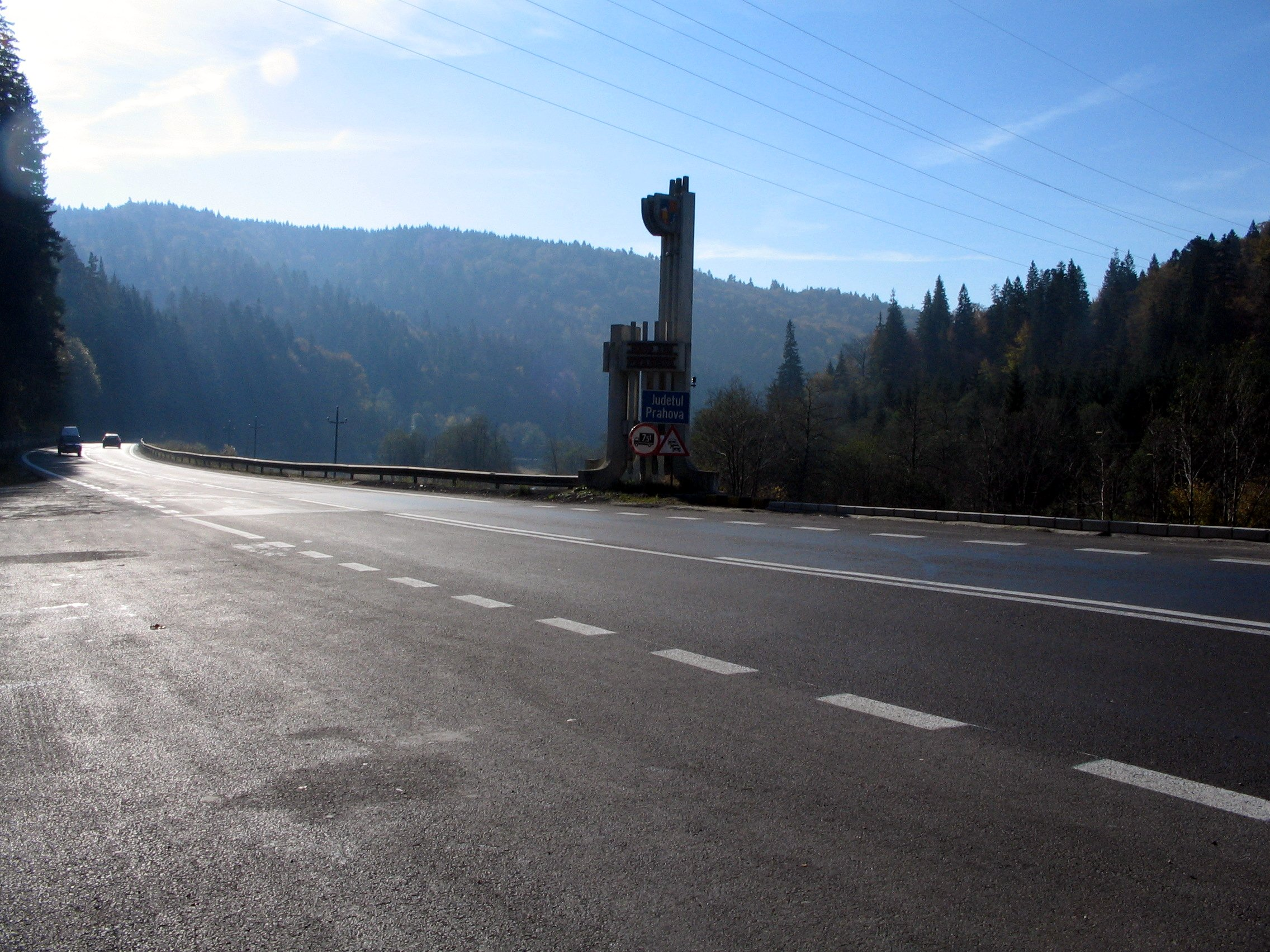
DN1 between Azuga and Predeal, at the Prahova County northern limit

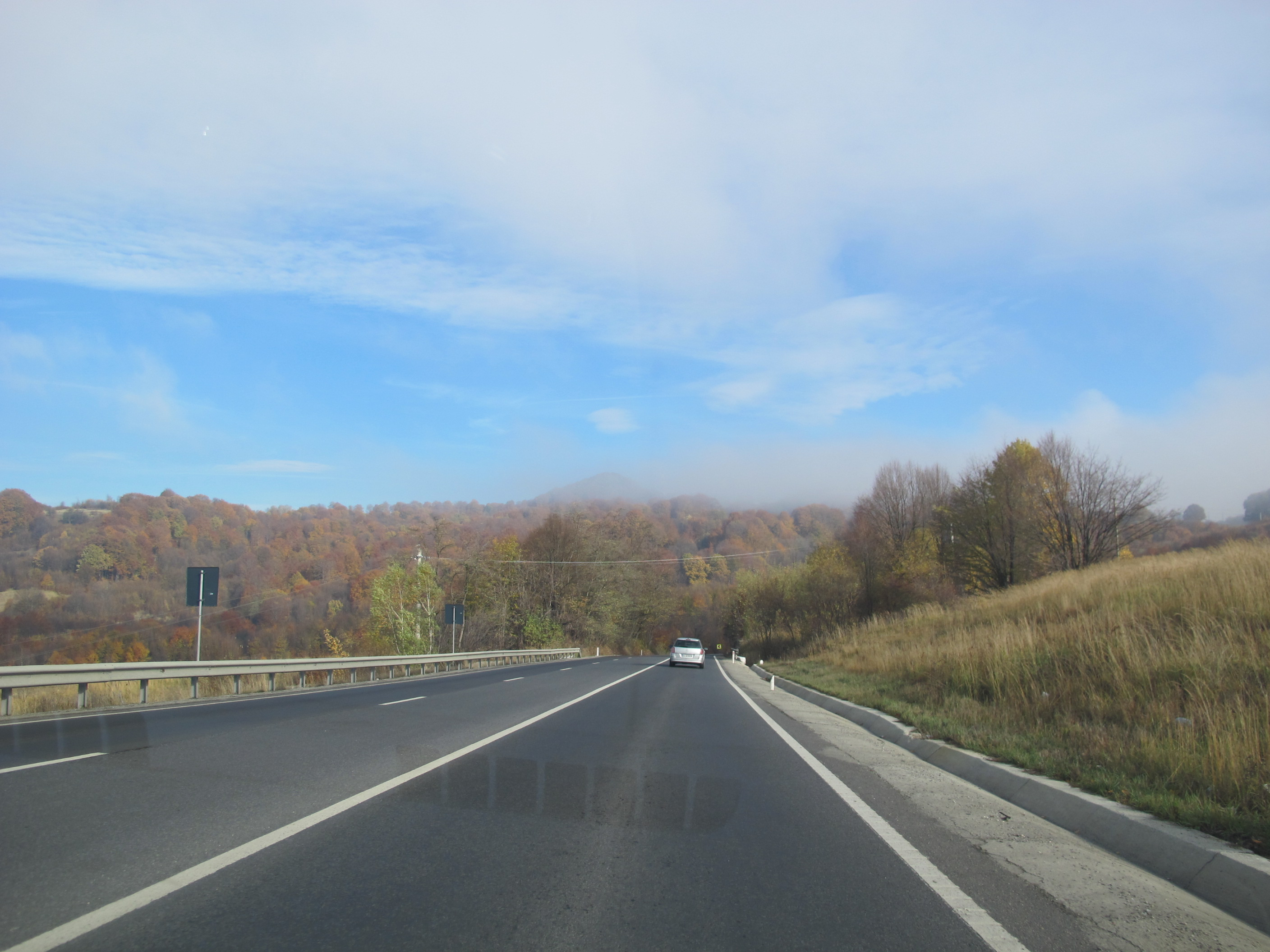
DN1 between Brașov and Sibiu, in the Perșani Pass
