= Agigea (disambiguation) =

Agigea is a commune in Constanța County, Romania.

Agigea may also refer to:

- Agigea, Constanța, village in the Agigea commune, Romania
- Agigea Sea Dunes, protected area, Romania
- Agigea River, Romania
