= European route E675 =

Road in trans-European E-road network

E675

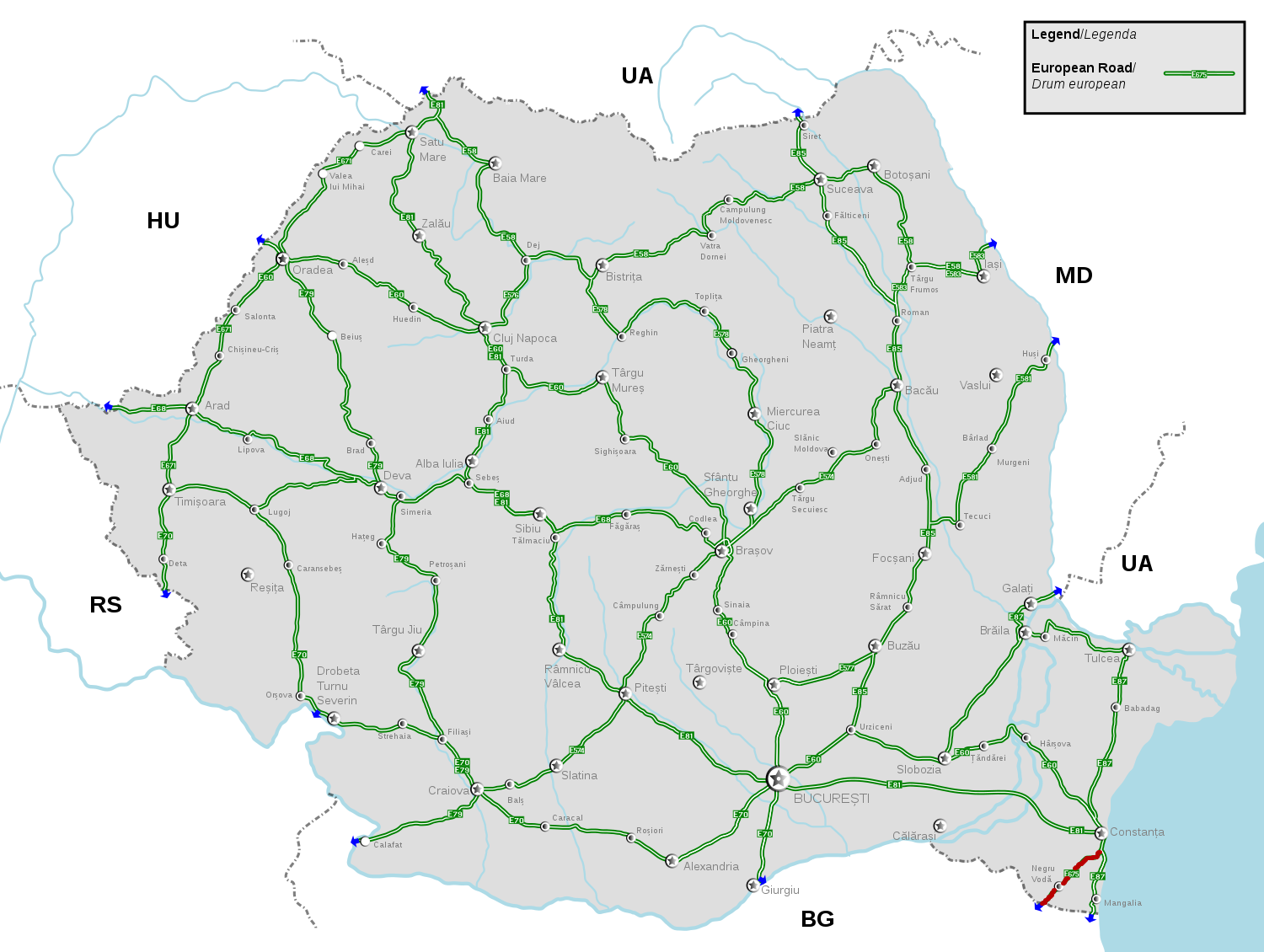

Route information
- Length: 59 km (37 mi)

Major junctions
- From: Agigea
- To: Kardam

Location
- Countries: Romania, Bulgaria

Highway system
- International E-road network; A Class; B Class

European route E 675 is a European B class road in Romania and Bulgaria, connecting the cities Agigea – Kardam.

== Route ==
- Romania
  - Agigea
- Bulgaria
  - Kardam
