= European route E81 =

Road in trans-European E-road network

E81

Route information
- Length: 956 km (594 mi)

Major junctions
- North end: Mukachevo
- South end: Constanța, Romania

Location
- Countries: Romania, Ukraine

Highway system
- International E-road network; A Class; B Class

European route E 81 (E 81) is a road part of the International E-road network. It begins in Mukachevo, Ukraine and ends in Constanța, Romania. The road is 956 km (594 mi) long.

== Route ==
Ukraine

- M 24: Mukachevo ( E50) ( E471) (Start of concurrency with E58) – Berehove
- M 23: Berehove – Vylok
- M 26: Vylok – Nevetlenfolu

Romania

- DN1C: Halmeu – Livada
- DN19: Livada (End of concurrency with E58) – Satu Mare
- DN19A: Satu Mare ( E671) – Supuru de Sus
- DN1F: Supuru de Sus – Zalău – Cluj-Napoca
- DN1: Cluj-Napoca (Start of concurrency with E60) – Turda (End of concurrency with E60) – Alba Iulia – Sebeș (Start of concurrency with E68) – Sibiu (End of concurrency with E68)
- A 1: Sibiu
- DN1: Sibiu (Start of concurrency with E68) – Veștem (End of concurrency with E68)
- DN7: Veștem – Râmnicu Vâlcea – Pitești
- A 1: Pitești ( E574) – Bucharest ( E70) ( E85)
- A 2: Bucharest – Fetești – Cernavodă – Constanța
- A 4: Constanța – Agigea – Port of Constanța
