= European route E578 =

Road in trans-European E-road network

E578

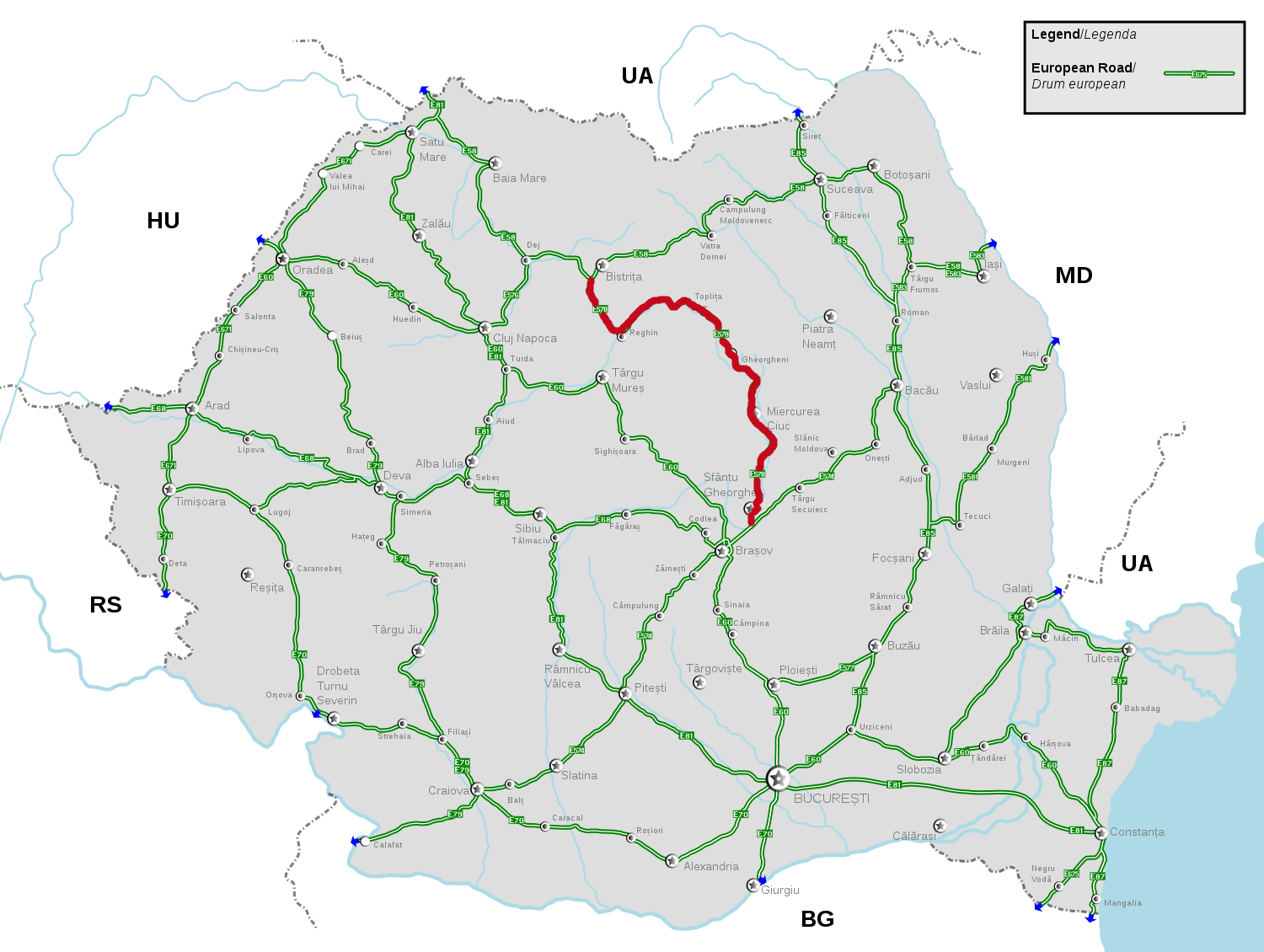
- E-roads in Romania, with E578 in red

Route information
- Length: 288 km (179 mi)

Major junctions
- From: Sărăţel
- To: Chichiș

Location
- Countries: Romania

Highway system
- International E-road network; A Class; B Class

European route E 578 is a European B class road in Romania, connecting the cities Sărăţel and Chichiș.

== Route and E-road junctions ==
- Romania (on shared signage DN15A then DN15 then DN12)
  - Sărăţel: E58
  - Chichiș: E574
