= Șieu-Măgheruș =

- Commune
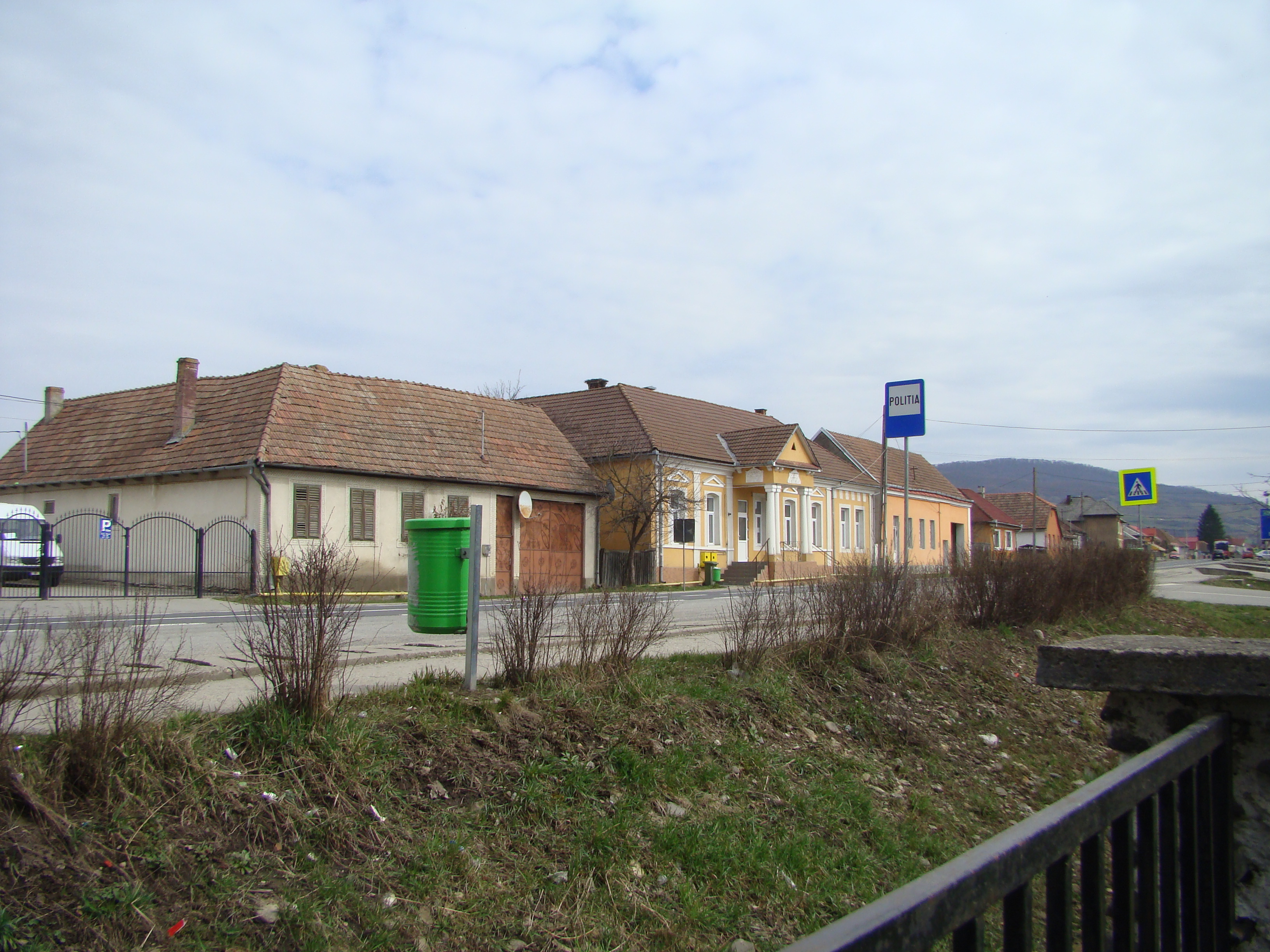
- Șieu-Măgheruș town hall

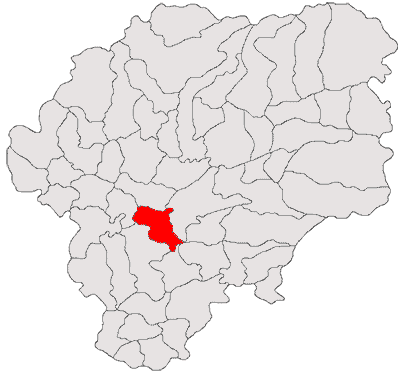
- Location in Bistrița-Năsăud County

- Location in Romania
- Coordinates: 47°5′N 24°23′E
- Country: Romania
- County: Bistrița-Năsăud

Government
  - Mayor (2020–2024): Sorin-Aurel Mititean (PNL)
- Area: 59.89 km^{2} (23.12 sq mi)
- Elevation: 308 m (1,010 ft)
- Population (2021-12-01): 4,540
  - Density: 75.8/km^{2} (196/sq mi)
- Time zone: UTC+02:00 (EET)
  - Summer (DST): UTC+03:00 (EEST)
- Postal code: 427295
- Vehicle reg.: BN
- Website: comuna-sieumagherus.ro

Șieu-Măgheruș (Hungarian: Sajómagyarós; German: Ungersdorf or Magyarosch or Nussdorf; Transylvanian Saxon: Ängersch) is a commune in Bistrița-Năsăud County, Transylvania, Romania.

It is composed of seven villages: Arcalia (Árokalja; German: Kallesdorf), Chintelnic (Kentelke or Kendtelke; German: Kindeln or Kinteln), Crainimăt (Királynémeti; German: Baierdorf), Podirei (Pogyerej), Sărățel (Szeretfalva; German: Reussen), Șieu-Măgheruș, and Valea Măgherușului (Sajómagyarósi völgy).

The commune lies on the Transylvanian Plateau, on the banks of the river Șieu. It is located in the central-south part of the county, at a distance of 22 km (14 mi) from the town of Beclean and 16 km (9.9 mi) from the county seat, Bistrița.

Șieu-Măgheruș is crossed by two national roads: DN17 (part of European route E58), which joins Dej in Cluj County to Suceava, and DN15A (part of European route E578), which joins Reghin in Mureș County to Bistrița; the two roads meet in the village of Sărățel.

There is also a train station in Sărățel, which serves the CFR Line 406, that runs from Bistrița Bârgăului to Bistrița North to here, and on to the town of Luduș, in Mureș County (the last segment is operated by Regio Călători).

== Natives ==
- Ioan Cherteș (1911–1992), cleric
- Teofil Herineanu (1909–1992), cleric
