= DN1A =

Road in Romania

National Road 1A
- Drumul Național 1A
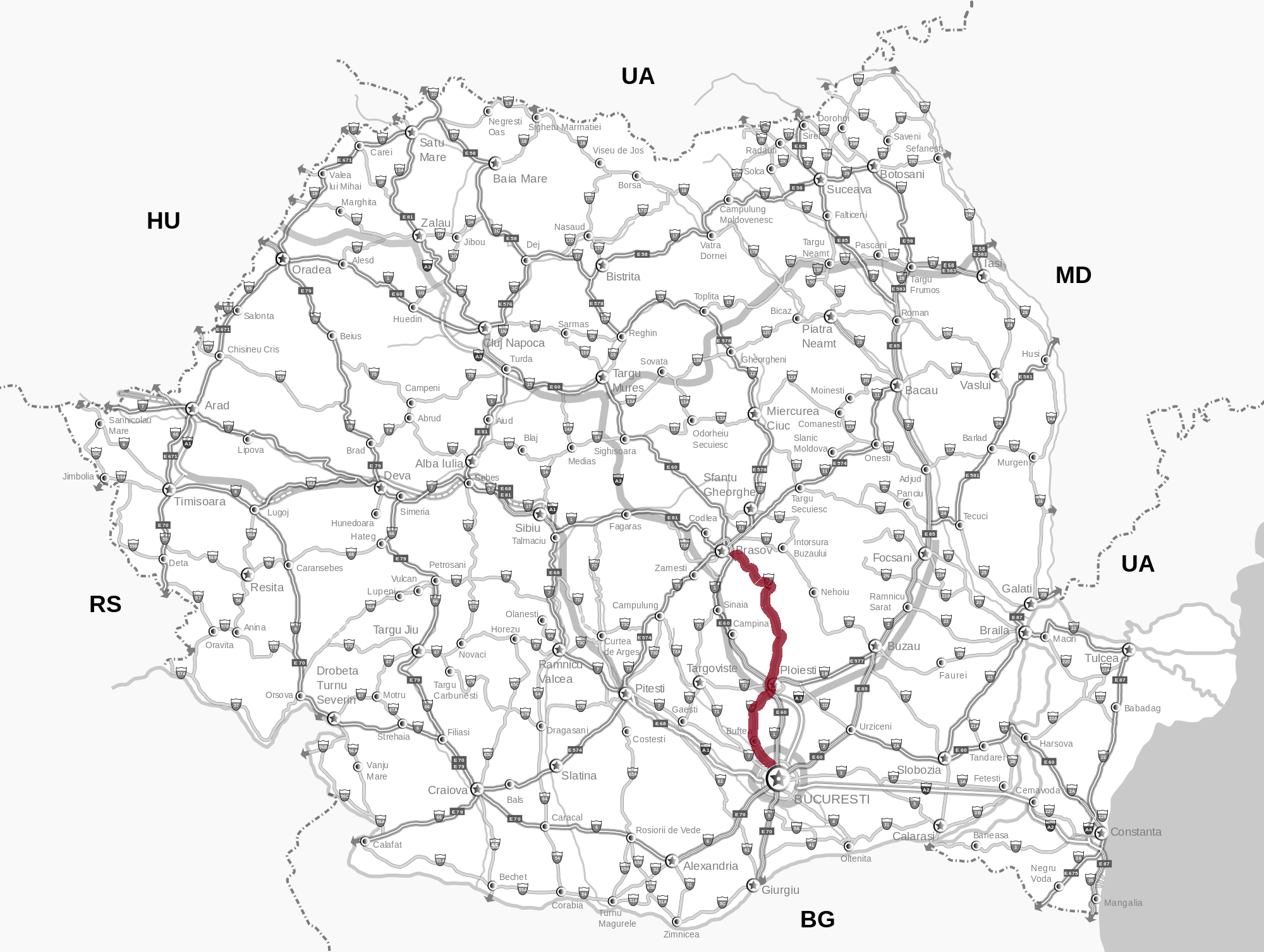

Route information
- Maintained by Compania Națională de Autostrăzi și Drumuri Naționale din România
- Length: 184.8 km (114.8 mi)

Major junctions
- From: Bucharest
- To: Brașov

Location
- Country: Romania
- Counties: Ilfov, Dâmbovița, Prahova, Brașov

Highway system
- Roads in Romania; Highways

DN1A (Romanian: Drumul Național 1A) is a national road in Romania connecting Bucharest and Brașov via Ploiești which is 184.8 km (114.8 mi) long. It serves as an alternative to the route through the Prahova Valley.

== See also ==
- DN1
- Roads in Romania
- Transport in Romania
