= European route E574 =

Road in trans-European E-road network

E574

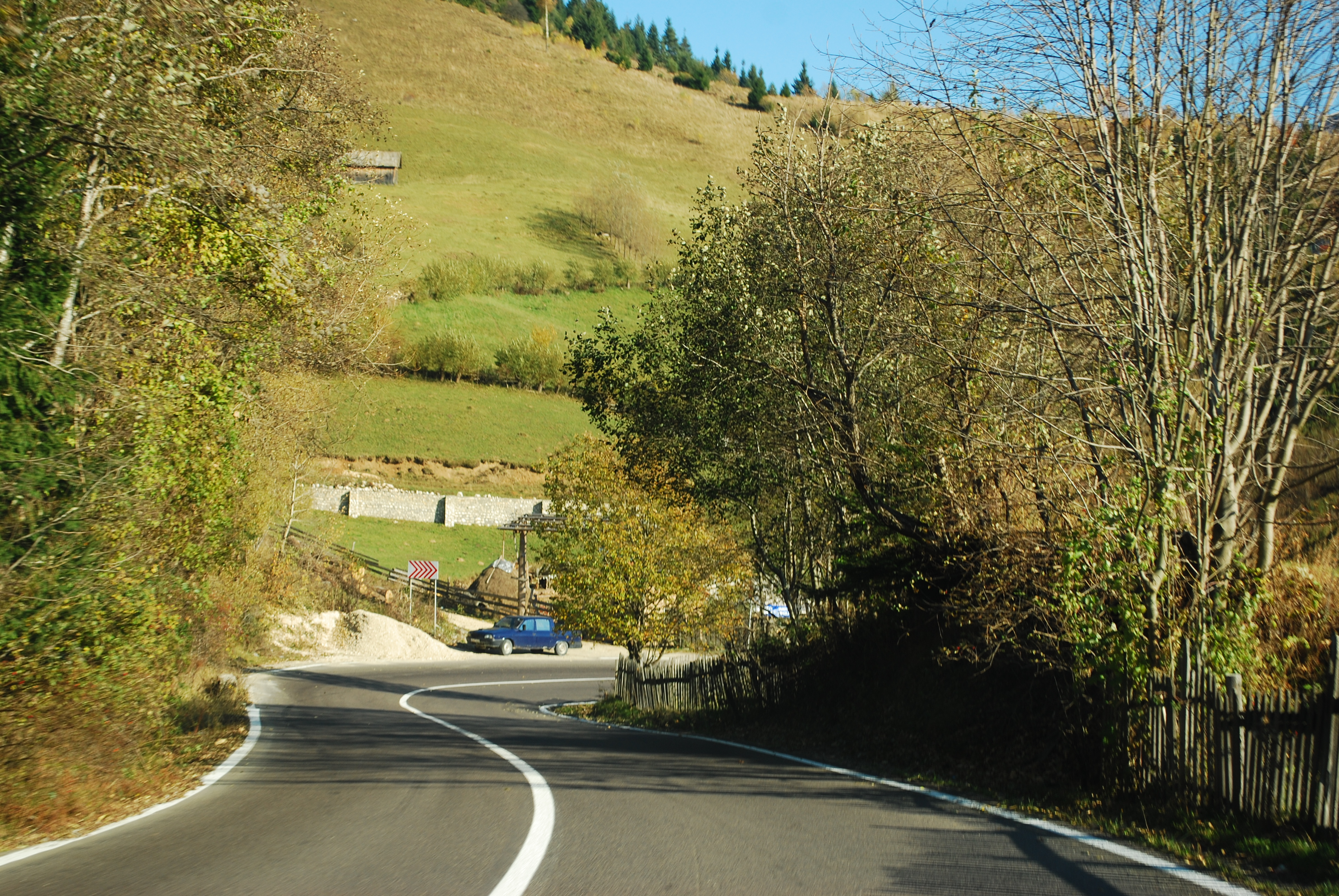
- The E574 near the border between Argeș County and Brașov County

Route information
- Length: 416 km (258 mi)

Major junctions
- From: Bacău
- Chichiș; Braşov; Piteşti
- To: Craiova

Location
- Countries: Romania

Highway system
- International E-road network; A Class; B Class

European route E 574 is a road part of the International E-road network. It begins in Bacău, Bacău County, Romania and ends in Craiova, Dolj County, Romania.

== Route and E-road junctions ==
- Romania (on shared signage DN11 then DN73A then DN73 then DN65)
  - Bacău: E85
  - Chichiș: E578
  - Braşov: E60, E68
  - Piteşti: E70, E81
  - Craiova: E79
