= DN1B =

Road in Romania

National Road 1B
- Drumul Național 1B
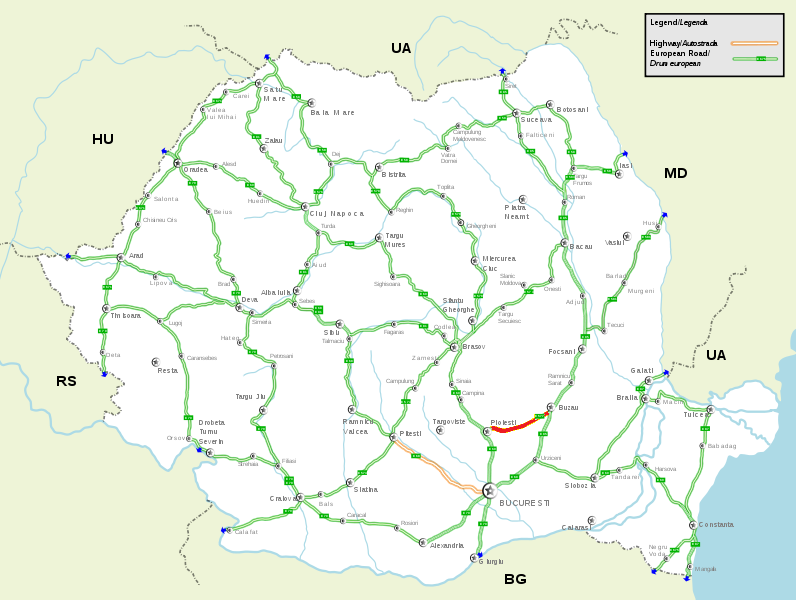

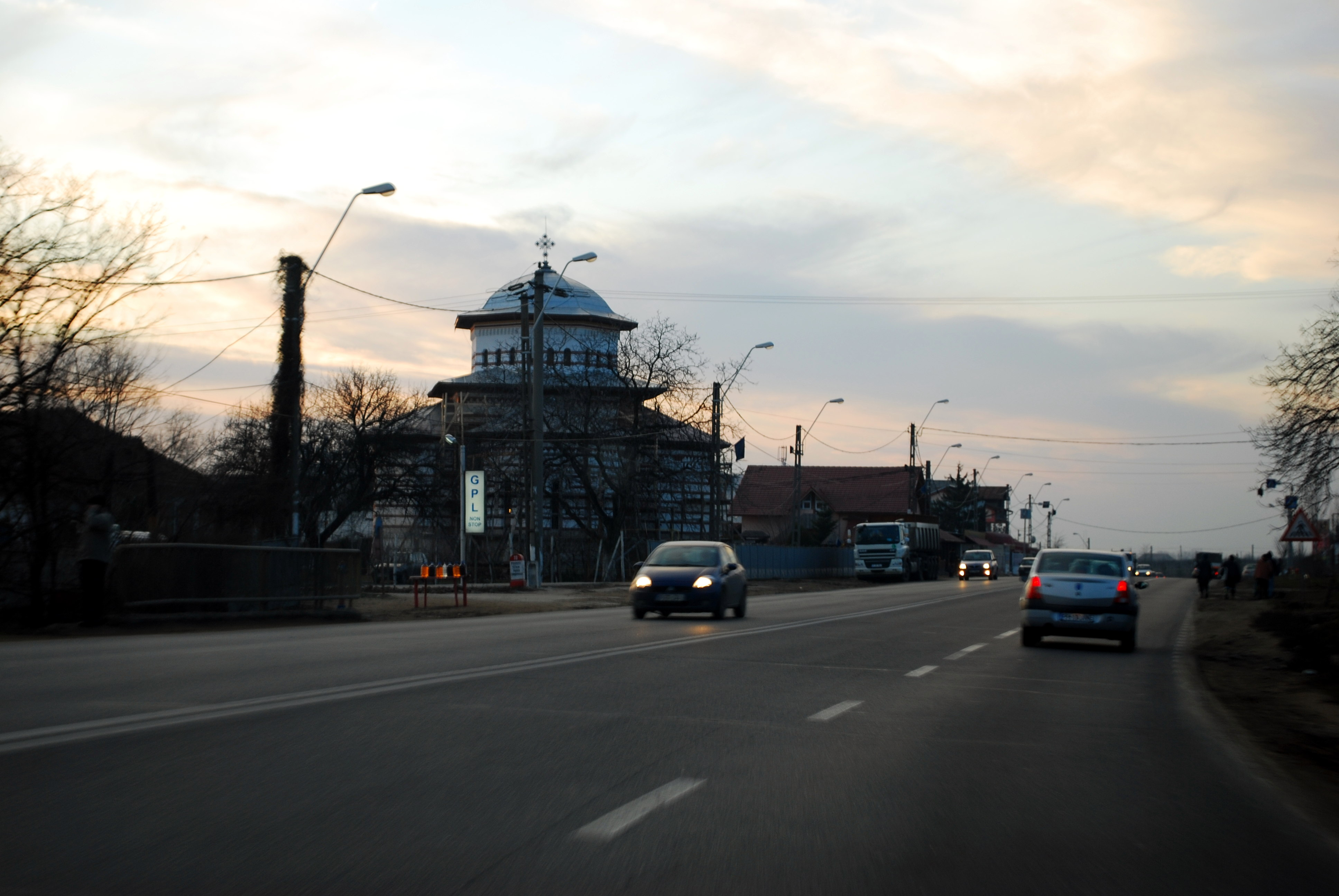

Route information
- Part of E577
- Maintained by Compania Națională de Autostrăzi și Drumuri Naționale din România
- Length: 67 km (42 mi)

Major junctions
- West end: Ploiești
- East end: Buzău

Location
- Country: Romania
- Counties: Prahova, Buzău

Highway system
- Roads in Romania; Highways

DN1B (Romanian: Drumul Național 1B) is a national road in Romania which runs from Ploiești to Buzău via Mizil. The DN1B has recently been upgraded. On its first segment, from Ploiești to Valea Călugărească it runs through one of Romania's most important wine regions and the site of many inns (hanuri) and historical cellars, many of which were built in the 18th and 19th centuries. The DN1B is therefore known as Romania's "wine road".

The A7 motorway will serve as a safer and high-speed alternative to the DN1B when completed between Ploiești and Buzău, with Mizil being served through an exit from the motorway at Cireșanu.
