= European route E771 =

Road in trans-European E-road network

E771

Route information
- Length: 225 km (140 mi)

Major junctions
- From: Drobeta-Turnu Severin
- To: Niš

Location
- Countries: Romania, Serbia

Highway system
- International E-road network; A Class; B Class

European route E 771 is a European B class road in Romania and Serbia, connecting the cities Drobeta-Turnu Severin and Niš.

== Major cities ==
- ROU
  - Drobeta-Turnu Severin( E70)
- SRB
  - Kladovo
  - Negotin
  - Zaječar( E761)
  - Knjaževac
  - Niš( E80 E75)
