= DN21 =

Road in Romania

National Road 21
- Drumul Național 21
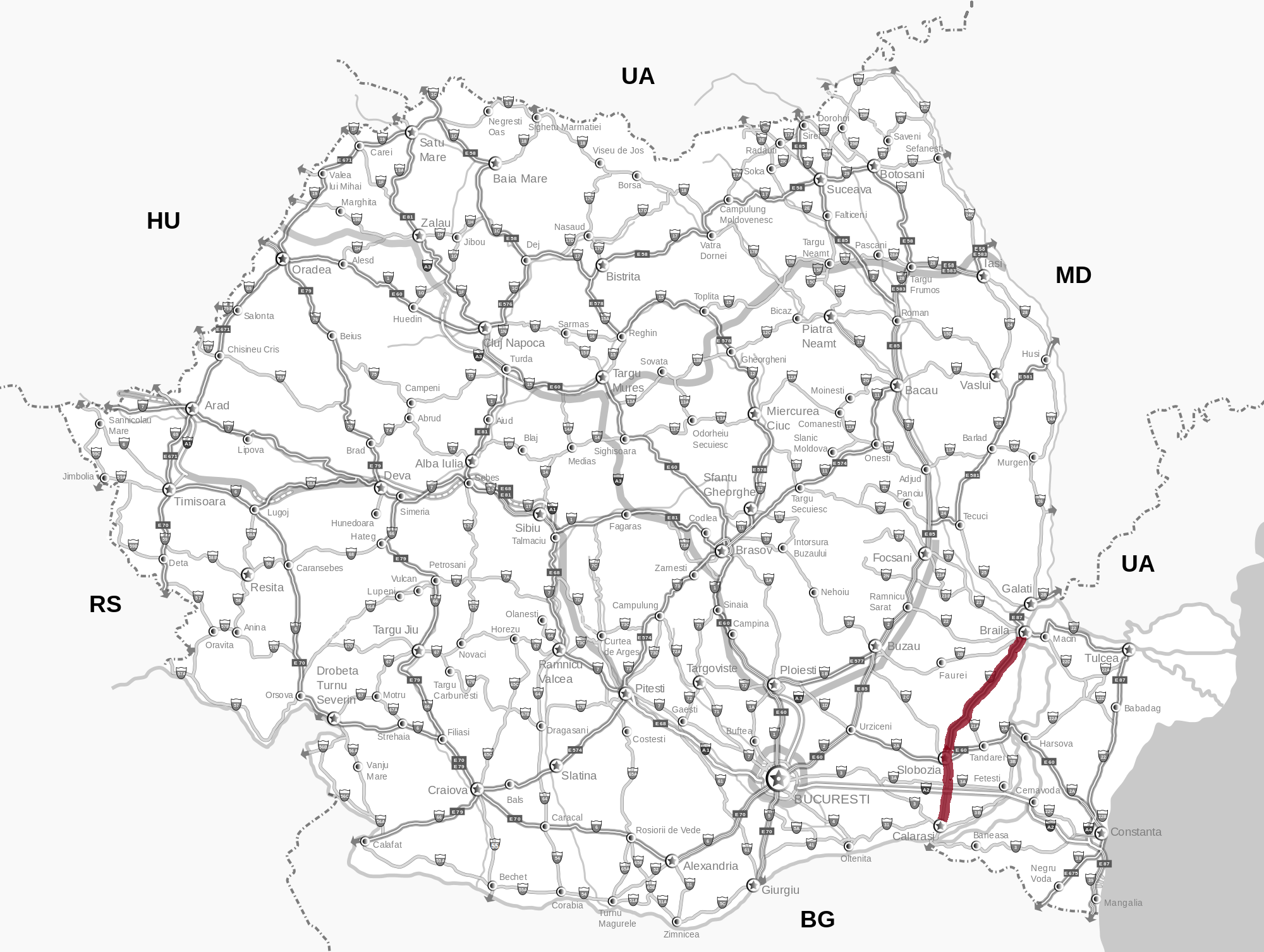

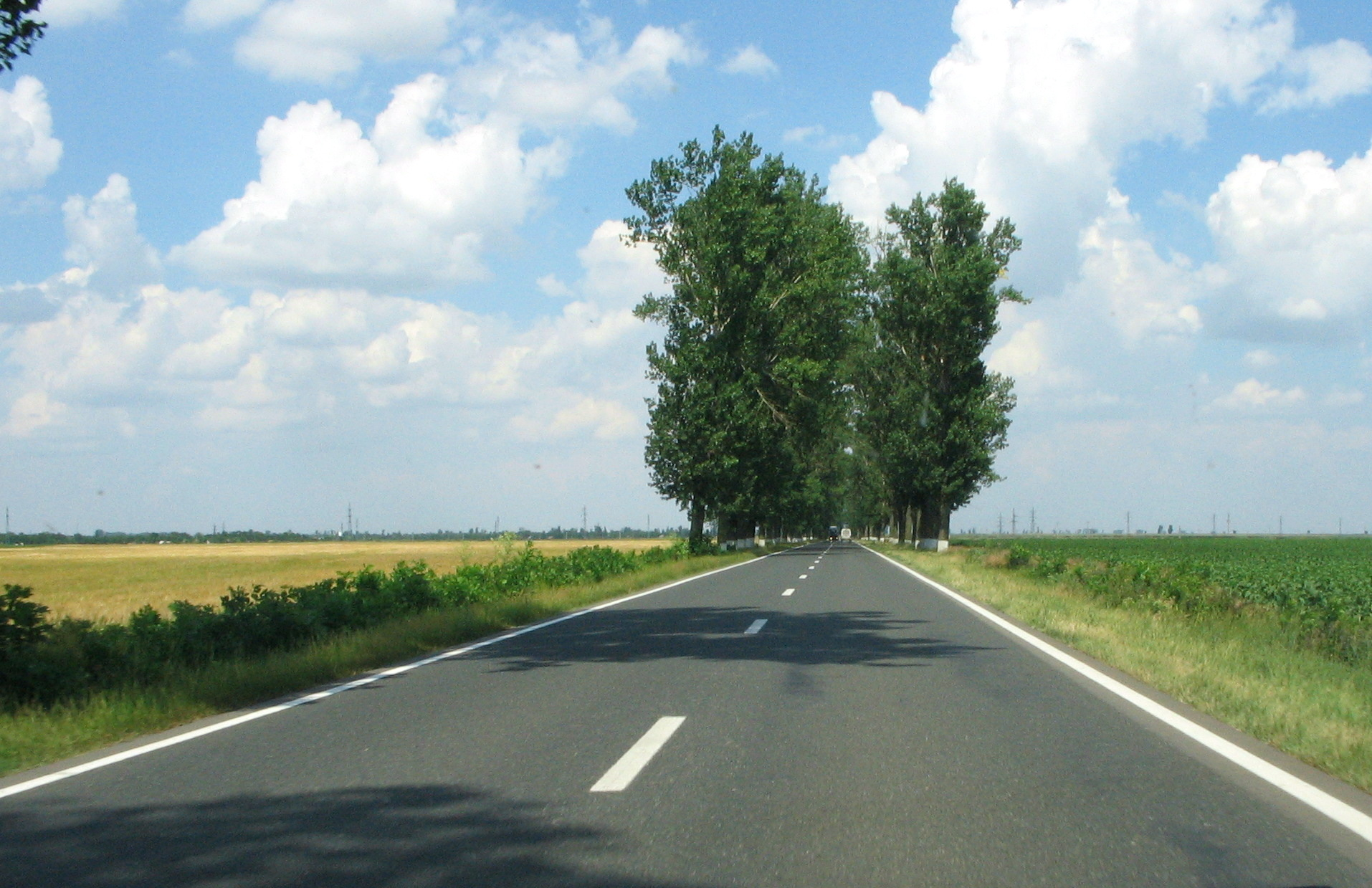
- DN21 in Brăila County

Route information
- Part of E584
- Maintained by Compania Națională de Autostrăzi și Drumuri Naționale din România
- Length: 132.2 km (82.1 mi)

Major junctions
- From: Brăila
- To: Călărași

Location
- Country: Romania
- Major cities: Brăila, Slobozia, and Călărași

Highway system
- Roads in Romania; Highways

DN21 (Romanian: Drumul Național 21) is a national road in Romania which that crosses the Bărăgan Plain, linking the Danube port of Brăila with Călărași. The road crosses the A2 motorway near Drajna, between the cities of Slobozia and Călărași. It underwent in major repairs between 2006 and 2007 on the 24.2 km (15.0 mi) section between Drajna and Călărași.
