= European route E576 =

Road in trans-European E-road network

E576

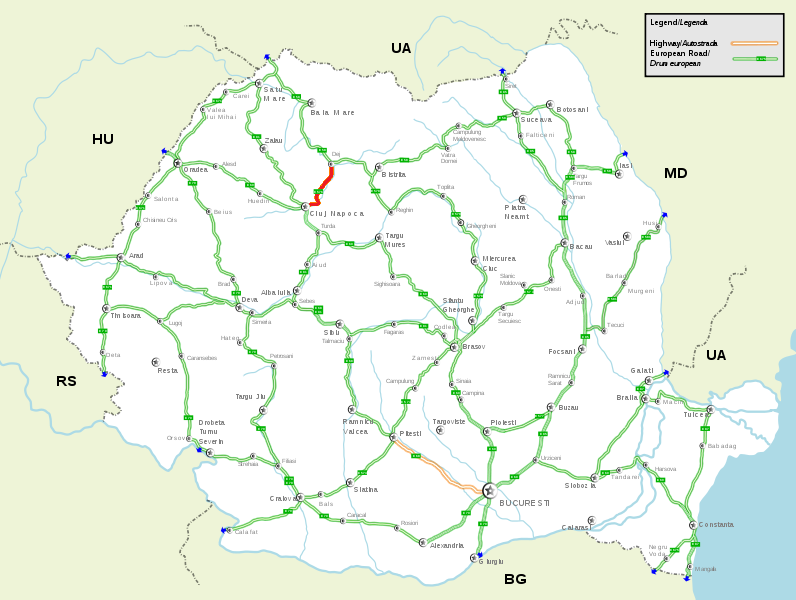
- European routes in Romania with E 576 in red

Route information
- Length: 58 km (36 mi)

Major junctions
- From: Dej
- To: Cluj-Napoca

Location
- Countries: Romania

Highway system
- International E-road network; A Class; B Class

European route E 576 is a secondary E-road found in northwestern Romania.

== Route ==
- Romania (on shared signage DN 1C)
  - Dej: E58
  - Cluj-Napoca: E60, E81
