= European route E005 =

Road in trans-European E-road network

E005

Major junctions
- From: G‘uzor
- To: Samarkand

Location
- Countries: Uzbekistan

Highway system
- International E-road network; A Class; B Class

E 005 is a European B class road in Uzbekistan, connecting the cities G‘uzor – Samarkand.

== Route ==
- Uzbekistan
  - G‘uzor
  - Samarkand

== Lack of signage ==
The E005 does not carry an official national route number. Lying completely in Uzbekistan, no part of the E005 is signed as such.
