= European route E577 =

Road in trans-European E-road network

E577

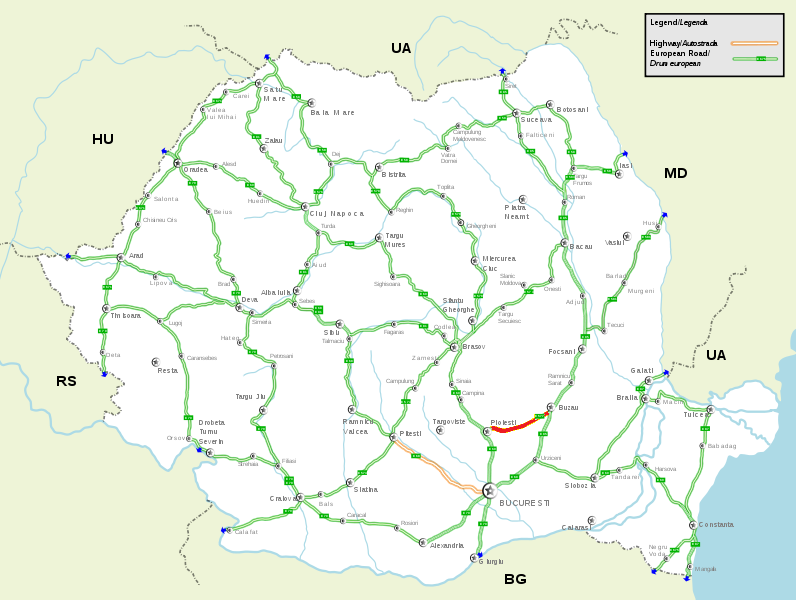
- European routes in Romania with E 577 in red

Route information
- Length: 75 km (47 mi)
- Existed: 2004–present

Major junctions
- From: Ploiești
- To: Buzău

Location
- Countries: Romania

Highway system
- International E-road network; A Class; B Class

European route E 577 is a secondary E-road found in northwestern Romania.

== Route ==
- Romania (on shared signage DN1B)
  - Ploiești: E60
  - Buzău: E85

== Former route ==
The designation E 577 was previously used on a route from Poltava to Slobozia. That route is now E584.
