= Topraisar =

- Commune
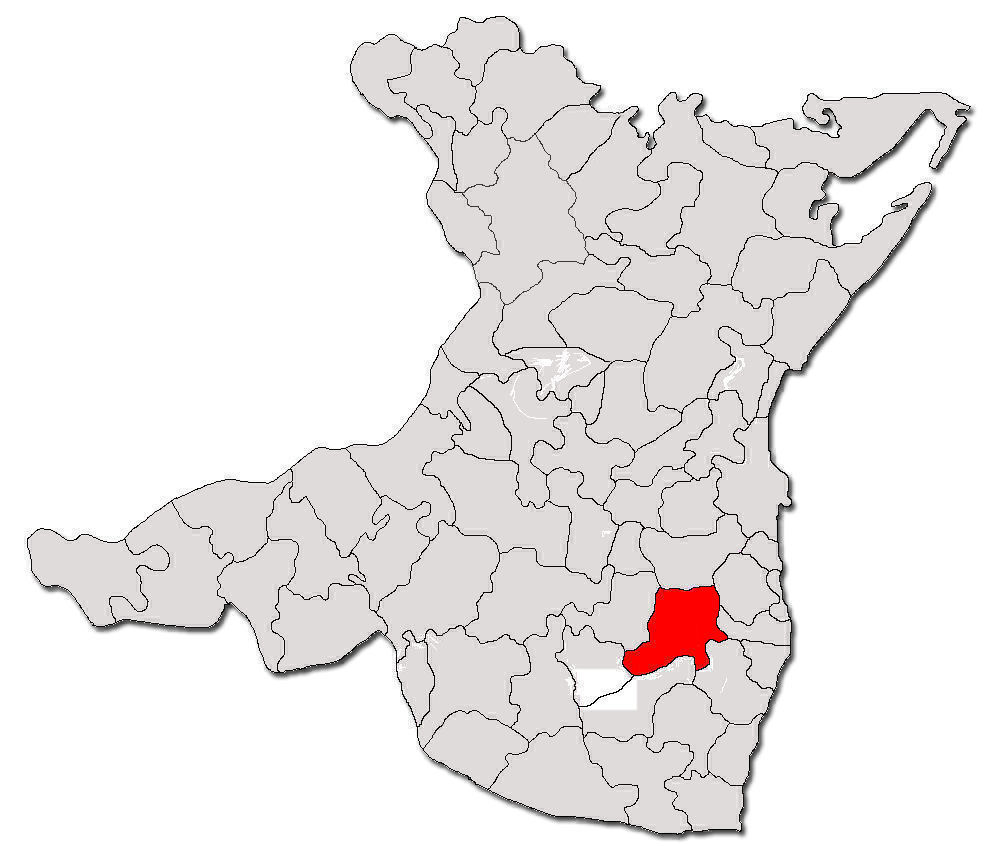
- Location in Constanța County

- Location in Romania
- Coordinates: 44°00′36″N 28°27′00″E
- Country: Romania
- County: Constanța
- Subdivisions: Topraisar, Biruința, Movilița, Potârnichea

Government
  - Mayor (2020–2024): Stelian Gheorghe (PSD)
- Area: 131.65 km^{2} (50.83 sq mi)
- Population (2021-12-01): 5,907
  - Density: 44.87/km^{2} (116.2/sq mi)
- Time zone: UTC+02:00 (EET)
  - Summer (DST): UTC+03:00 (EEST)
- Vehicle reg.: CT
- Website: www.primaria-topraisar.ro

Topraisar (Romanian pronunciation: [tropajˈsar]) is a commune in the Constanța County, Northern Dobruja, Romania.

The commune includes four villages:

- Topraisar (historical name: Crimean Tatar: Topraysar)
- Biruința (historical name: Crimean Tatar: Muratan, probably rounded out phonetically from Murat Han)
- Movilița (historical name: Crimean Tatar: Musurat, probably rounded out phonetically from Musavvirat; for short periods in the 20th century it has also been named Regele Mihai and Filimon Sîrbu (1948-1964) )
- Potârnichea (historical name: Crimean Tatar: Abdullahköy)

Topraisar and the surrounding areas were the site of fierce fighting in 1916 during two battles of the World War I: the First and Second Battle of Cobadin.

== Etymology ==
Topraysar is of Tatar origin and is rounded out phonetically from Top Rayis Hisar meaning The Fortress of the President of the Union.

Top Rayis meaning The Elected Leader of the Union or The President of the Union appears to designate Queen Tomyris and it seems to stand also at the origin of Dobruja and the ancient city of Tomis.

Some people believe that the name of the commune derivates from Toprak Hisar meaning Earth/Clay Fortress.

== Demographics ==
At the 2011 census, Topraisar had 4,758 Romanians (92.42%), 3 Roma (0.06%), 17 Turks (0.33%), 359 Tatars (6.97%), 11 others (0.21%).
