= Schitu Golești =

Coordinates: 45°11′N 25°00′E

- Commune
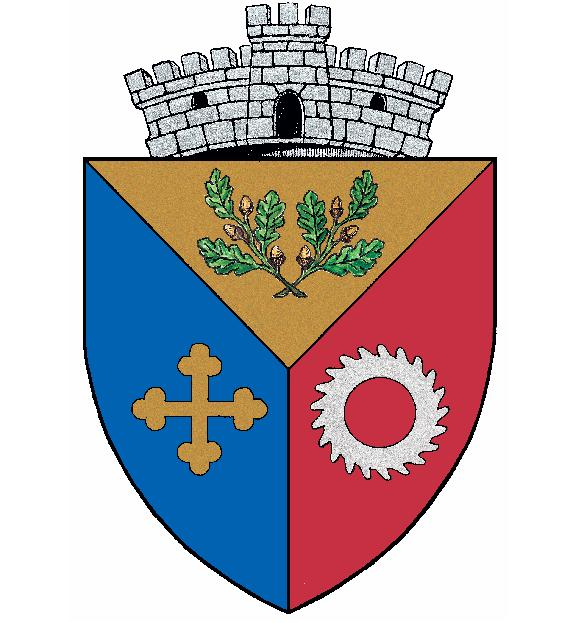
- Coat of arms

- Location in Romania
- Coordinates
- Country: Romania
- County: Argeș

Government
  - Mayor (2020–2024): Vasile Tudorel Miriță (PNL)
- Area: 25.8 km^{2} (10.0 sq mi)
- Elevation: 469 m (1,539 ft)
- Population (2021-12-01): 4,683
  - Density: 180/km^{2} (470/sq mi)
- Time zone: EET/EEST (UTC+2/+3)
- Postal code: 117650
- Vehicle reg.: AG
- Website: www.schitugolesti.ro

Schitu Golești is a commune in Argeș County, Muntenia, Romania. It is composed of six villages: Burnești, Costiță, Lăzărești, Loturi, Schitu Golești, and Valea Pechii.

== Natives ==
- Ionuț Andrei (born 1985), bobsledder
- Simon Măzărache (born 1993), footballer
- Titus Munteanu (1941−2013), director, filmmaker, and producer
