= Manoleasa =

- Commune
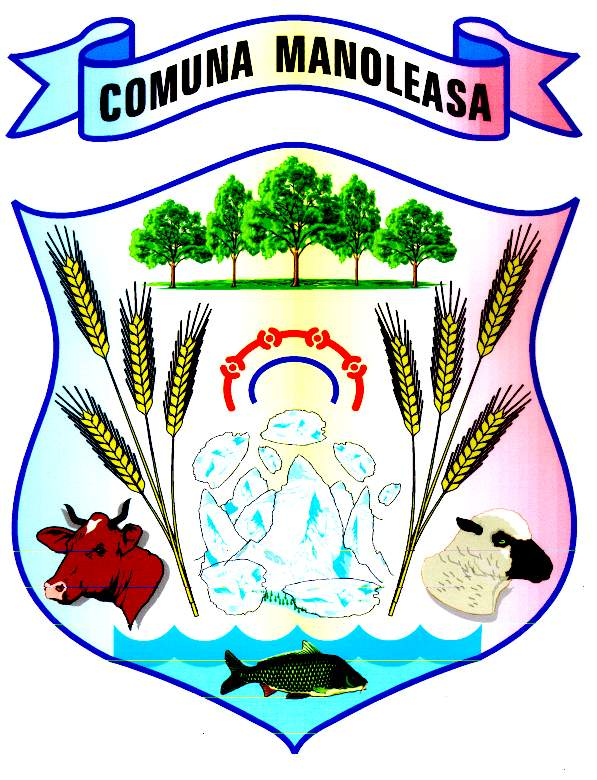
- Coat of arms

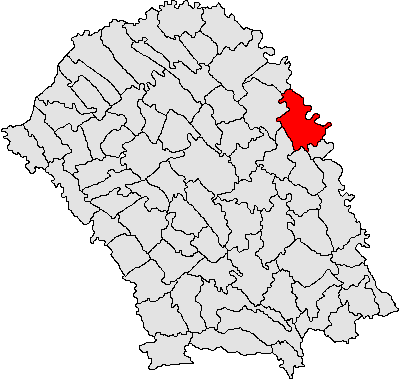
- Location in Botoșani County

- Location in Romania
- Coordinates: 47°59′N 27°04′E
- Country: Romania
- County: Botoșani
- Subdivisions: Manoleasa, Bold, Flondora, Iorga, Liveni, Loturi, Manoleasa-Prut, Sadoveni, Șerpenița, Zahoreni

Government
  - Mayor (2024–2028): Cristinel Leonard Aroșculesei (PSD)
- Area: 94.23 km^{2} (36.38 sq mi)
- Population (2021-12-01): 2,990
  - Density: 31.7/km^{2} (82.2/sq mi)
- Time zone: UTC+02:00 (EET)
  - Summer (DST): UTC+03:00 (EEST)
- Postal code: 717230
- Area code: +40 x31
- Vehicle reg.: BT
- Website: comunamanoleasa.ro

Manoleasa is a commune in Botoșani County, Western Moldavia, Romania. It is composed of eight villages: Flondora, Iorga, Liveni, Loturi, Manoleasa, Manoleasa-Prut, Sadoveni, Zahoreni.

Liveni is the commune's oldest attested village, being mentioned in a document of August 17, 1667.
