= Borș, Bihor =

Borș Bors
- Commune
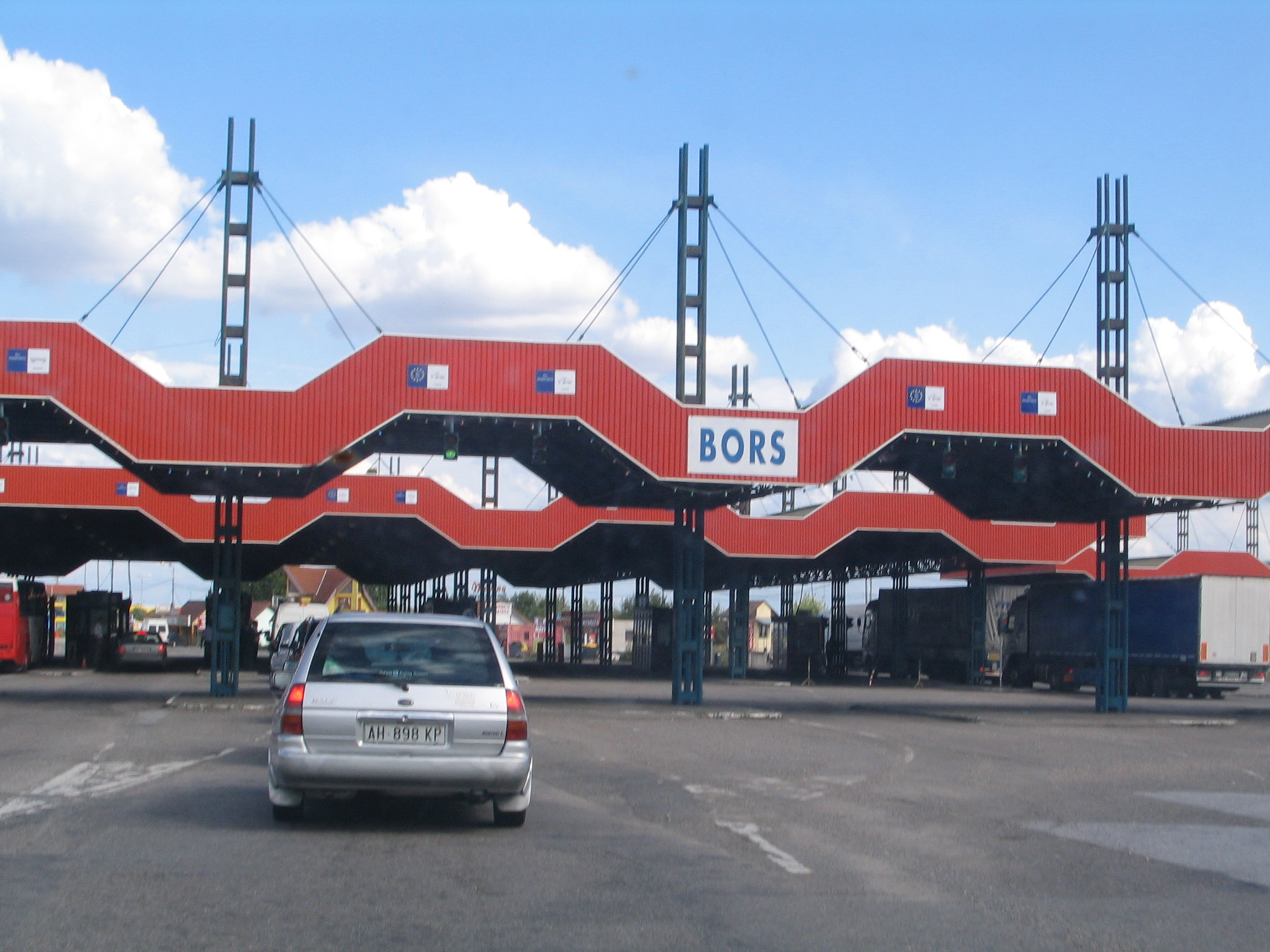
- Borș border crossing

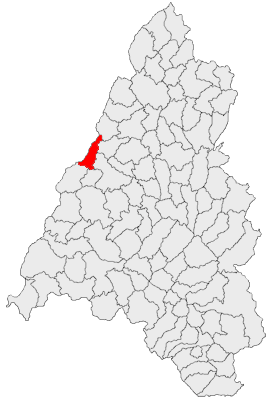
- Commune location in Bihor County

- Location in Romania
- Coordinates: 47°7′N 21°49′E
- Country: Romania
- County: Bihor

Government
  - Mayor (2020–2024): Géza Bátori (UDMR)
- Area: 43.68 km^{2} (16.86 sq mi)
- Elevation: 103 m (338 ft)
- Population (2021-12-01): 4,267
  - Density: 97.69/km^{2} (253.0/sq mi)
- Time zone: UTC+02:00 (EET)
  - Summer (DST): UTC+03:00 (EEST)
- Postal code: 417075
- Area code: (+40) 02 59
- Vehicle reg.: BH
- Website: primariabors.ro

Borș (Hungarian: Bors) is a commune in Bihor County, Crișana, Romania. It is composed of four villages: Borș, Santăul Mare (Nagyszántó), Santăul Mic (Kisszántó), and Sântion (Biharszentjános). There is an important border crossing with Hungary near Borș, both for road traffic (DN1) and rail traffic (CFR Line 300).

== Demographics ==
Historical population
Year	Pop.	±%
1880	3,384	—
1890	3,926	+16.0%
1910	3,498	−10.9%
1930	3,626	+3.7%
1941	3,366	−7.2%
1977	3,941	+17.1%
1992	3,285	−16.6%
2002	3,409	+3.8%
2011	3,946	+15.8%
2021	4,267	+8.1%
Source: Census data

At the 2021 census, Borș had a population of 4,267; of those inhabitants, 80.2% were Hungarians, 14.55% Romanians, 0.7% Roma, 0.07% Germans, and 4,45% others. At the 2011 census, the commune had 3,946 inhabitants; of those, 85.9% were Hungarians, 11.2% Romanians, 0.1% Germans, and 2.84% others. At the 2002 census, 92.7% of inhabitants were Hungarians, 6% Romanians, and 0.9% Roma.

== Natives ==
- Gyula Király (1927–2011), literary historian who lived and worked in Budapest
