= European route E671 =

Road in trans-European E-road network

E671

Route information
- Length: 300 km (190 mi)

Major junctions
- From: Timișoara
- Arad, Oradea
- To: Satu Mare

Location
- Countries: Romania

Highway system
- International E-road network; A Class; B Class

European route E 671 is a road part of the International E-road network. It begins in Timișoara, Timiș County, Romania and ends in Satu Mare. It is 300 km (190 mi) long.

== Route ==
- Romania
  - DN69: Timișoara–Arad
  - DN79: Arad–Oradea
  - DN19: Oradea–Satu Mare
