= Chichiș =

Chichiș Kökös
- Commune
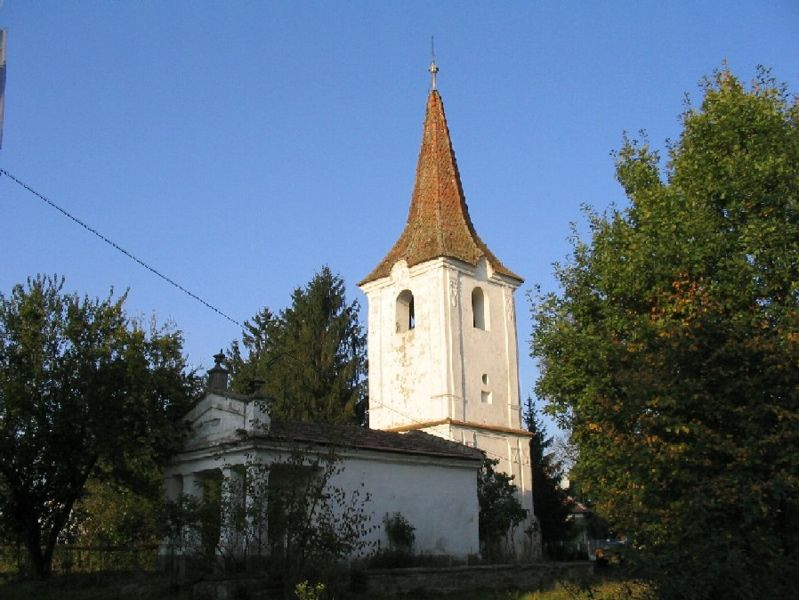
- Unitarian Church

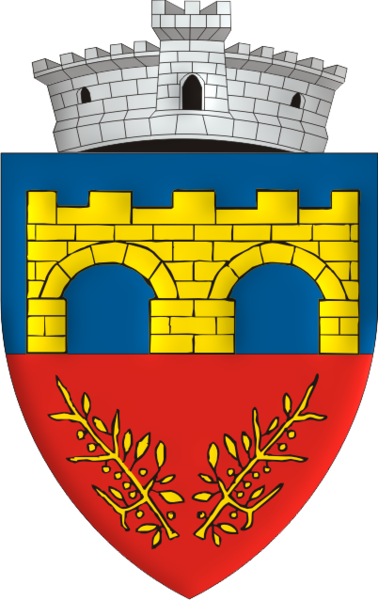
- Coat of arms

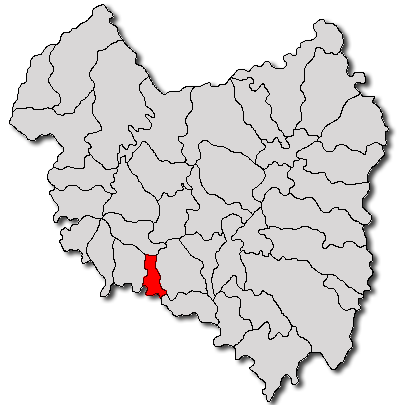
- Location in Covasna County

- Location in Romania
- Coordinates: 45°47′N 25°48′E
- Country: Romania
- County: Covasna

Government
  - Mayor (2020–2024): Silviu Tăras (UDMR)
- Area: 20.64 km^{2} (7.97 sq mi)
- Elevation: 506 m (1,660 ft)
- Population (2021-12-01): 1,540
  - Density: 74.6/km^{2} (193/sq mi)
- Time zone: UTC+02:00 (EET)
  - Summer (DST): UTC+03:00 (EEST)
- Postal code: 527075
- Area code: (+40) 02 67
- Vehicle reg.: CV
- Website: www.chichis.ro

Chichiș (Hungarian: Kökös, Hungarian pronunciation: [ˈkøkøʃ]) is a commune in Covasna County, Transylvania, Romania, composed of two villages: Băcel (Kökösbácstelek) and Chichiș.

It formed part of the Székely Land region of the historical Transylvania province.

== Demographics ==
The commune has a Székely Hungarian majority. At the 2011 census, it had a population of 1,519, of which 54.05% were Hungarians and 44.18% Romanians; Chichiș village had an absolute Hungarian majority, while Băcel had an absolute Romanian majority. At the 2021 census, the population slightly increased to 1,540, of which 50.58% were Hungarians and 44.68% Romanians.
