= Agigea =

- Commune
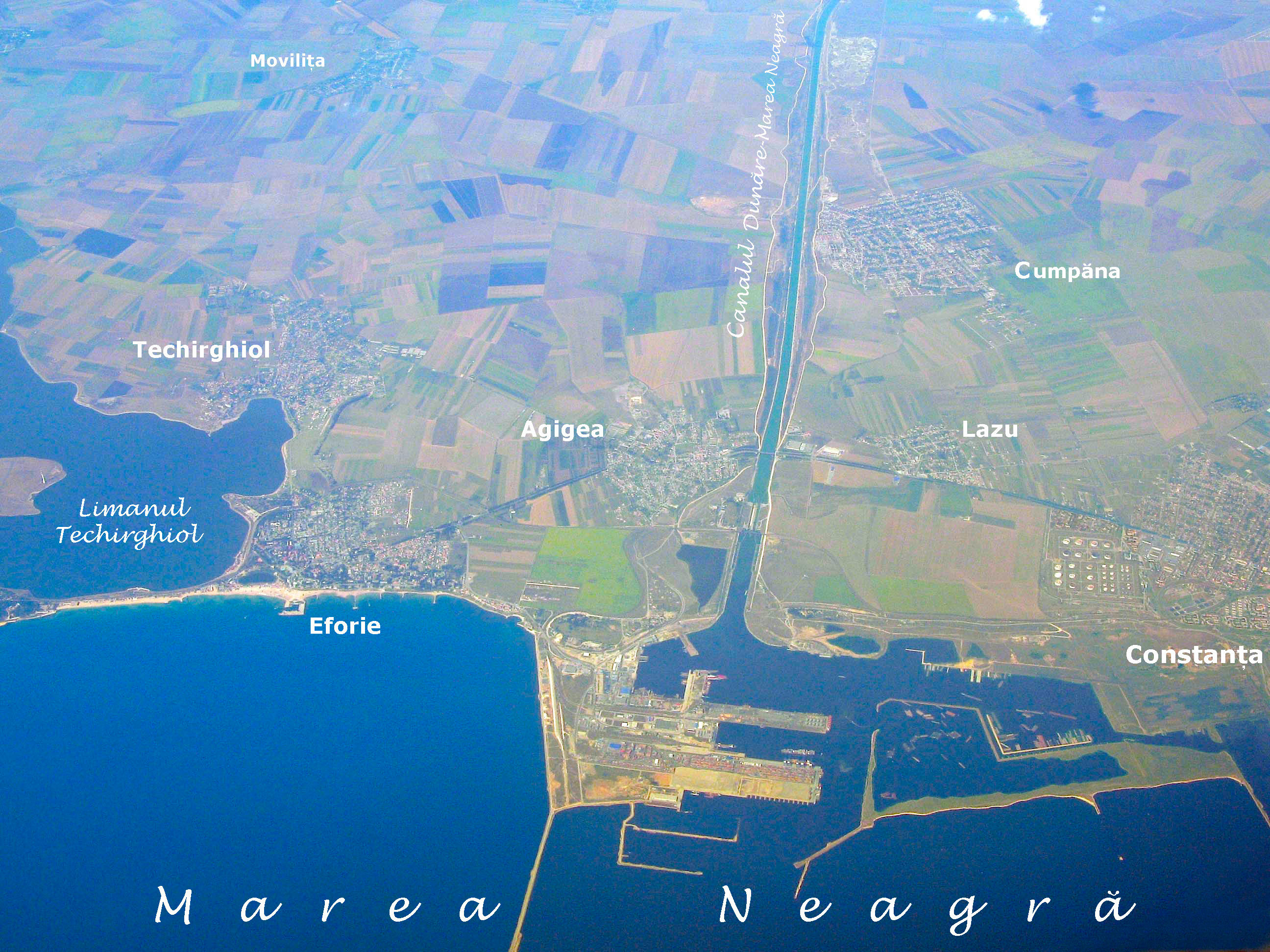

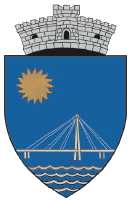
- Coat of arms

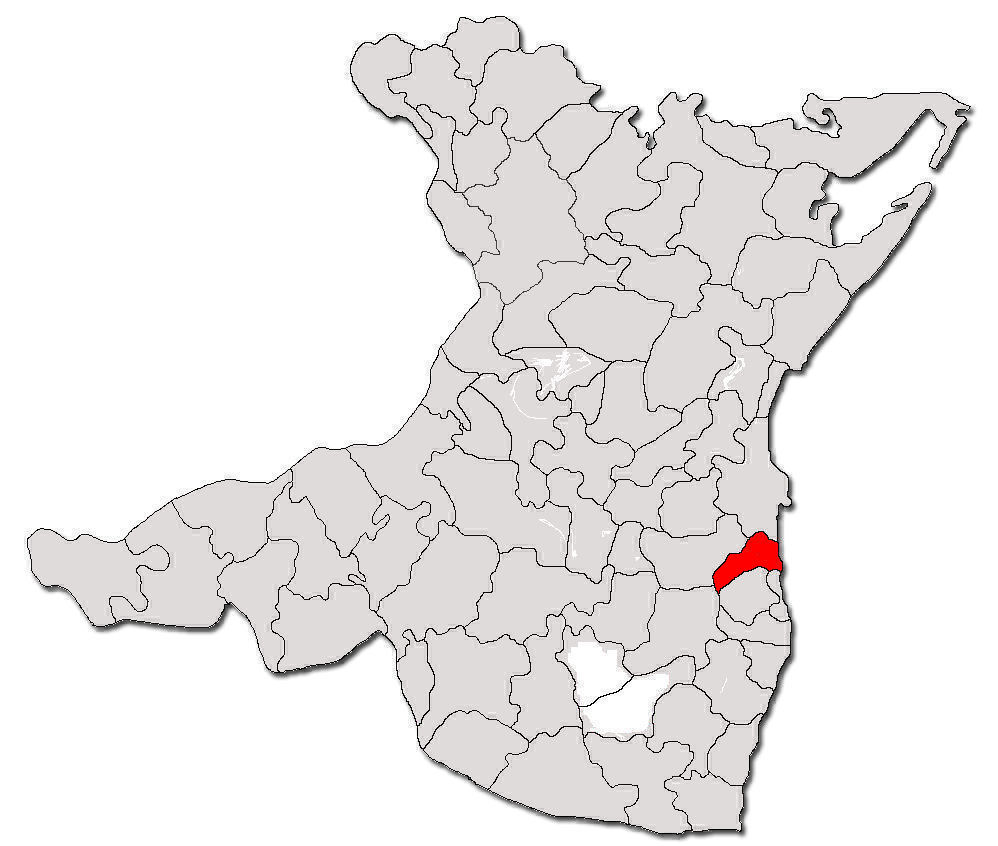
- Location in Constanța County

- Location in Romania
- Coordinates: 44°05′30″N 28°36′41″E
- Country: Romania
- County: Constanța
- Subdivisions: Agigea, Lazu, Sanatoriul Agigea, Stațiunea Zoologică Marină Agigea

Government
  - Mayor (2020–2024): Cristian-Maricel Cîrjaliu (PSD)
- Area: 45.28 km^{2} (17.48 sq mi)
- Elevation: 10 m (33 ft)
- Population (2021-12-01): 8,722
  - Density: 192.6/km^{2} (498.9/sq mi)
- Time zone: UTC+02:00 (EET)
  - Summer (DST): UTC+03:00 (EEST)
- Postal code: 907015
- Area code: +(40) x41
- Vehicle reg.: CT
- Website: primaria-agigea.ro

Agigea (Romanian pronunciation: [aˈd͡ʒid͡ʒe̯a]; Turkish: Acıçay, Greek: Aghikos) is a commune in Constanța County, Northern Dobruja, Romania. The commune includes four settlements: Agigea, Lazu (Turkish: Laz-Mahale), Sanatoriul Agigea, and Stațiunea Zoologică Marină Agigea, the last two being special settlements.

== Demographics ==
Historical population
Year	Pop.	±%
2002	5,482	—
2011	6,922	+26.3%
2021	8,722	+26.0%
Source: Census data

At the 2011 census, Agigea had a population of 6,922, which included 5,822 Romanians(90.46%), 443 Tatars (6.88%), 95 Turks (1.48%), 15 Roma (0.23%), 10 Lipovans (0.16%), 9 Aromanians (0.14%), 8 Hungarians (0.12%), 29 others (0.45%), 5 with undeclared ethnicity (0.08%). At the 2021 census, the commune had a population of 8,722; of those, 78.66% were Romanians and 3.94% Tatars.

== Infrastructure ==
In the western urban area at 44°5'23"N 28°36'12"E, there is a mediumwave transmitter operating on 1458 kHz. North of Agigea at 44°6'19"N 28°37'49"E, there is Constanța coast radio station, which serves also for transmitting NAVTEX-messages in Romanian on 490 kHz.
