= Bucharest Ring Motorway =

Motorway under construction in Romania

A0 motorway

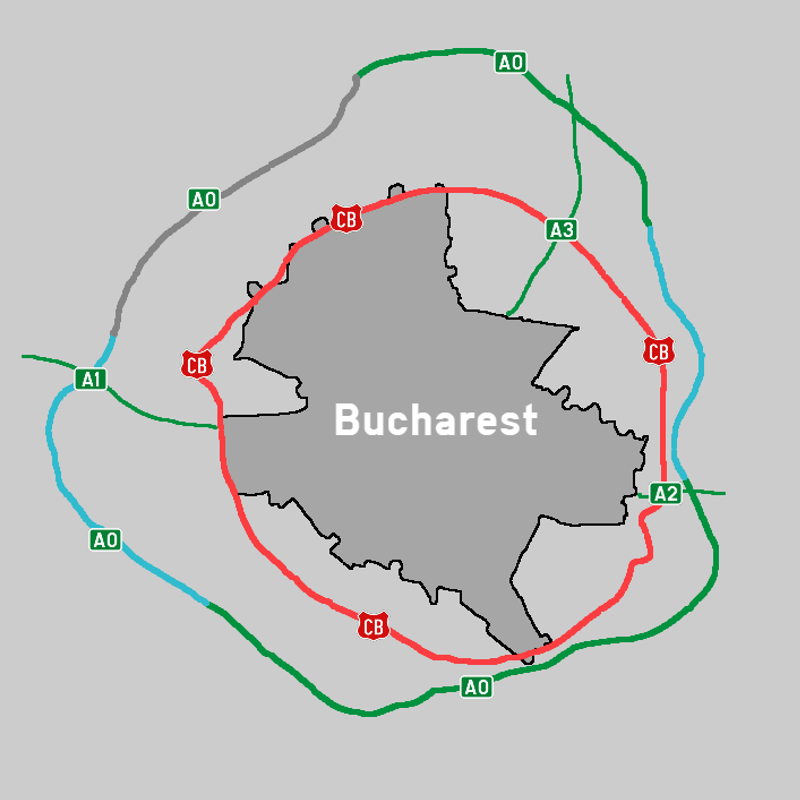
- Map of the A0 motorway, as of September 2024

Route information
- Maintained by Compania Națională de Administrate a Infrastructurii Rutiere
- Length: 83 km (52 mi) 101 km (63 mi) planned 17.5 km (10.9 mi) under construction
- Existed: 2023–present

Major junctions
- Beltway around Bucharest
- A 1 near Ciorogârla; DN7 near Buftea (under construction); DN1A near Buftea (under construction); DN1 near Otopeni; A 3 near Voluntari; DN2 near Afumați; DN3 near Pantelimon (planned); A 2 near Cernica; DN4 near Popești-Leordeni; DN5 near Jilava; DN6 near Bragadiru

Location
- Country: Romania
- Counties: Ilfov, Giurgiu

Highway system
- Roads in Romania; Highways
← A 14	→ A 1

The Bucharest Ring Motorway (or the Bucharest Belt Motorway, Romanian: Autostrada Centura București), termed A0, is a partially built motorway ring around the city of Bucharest, the capital of Romania. It is serving as a second, outer ring around the city, the first being the existing Bucharest Ring Road.

It is split into two major sections: the northern and southern half-rings that are each divided into multiple lots. When fully built, it will have a total length of approximately 101 kilometers and will be a motorway connection between the existing A1, A2 and A3 motorways.

As of November 2026, the southern half-ring is fully completed and operational, while on the northern half-ring only one lot is still under construction. A1, A2 and A3 motorways are now connected through A0 using the southern half-ring and the opened parts of the northern half-ring.

== Sections ==
=== Southern half-ring ===
The South Ring Motorway (51.3 km) was tendered as a concession contract in December 2012, that was supposed to be awarded in November 2013. Yet, a new tender was announced in July 2017, that shall be completed between the end of 2017 and the first half of 2018, with an estimated cost of 580 million euros. Construction works should take three years and a half to complete. It will run through the south of Bucharest, along the route of the Pan-European Corridor IV.

A tender for a segment of 17.5 km (15.5 km of the South section and 2.5 km of the North section), called lot 3, between the A1 motorway and the DN6 road was launched in July 2017 and awarded in April 2018, to the joint-venture Spedition UMB–Tehnostrade–Artera Proiect, with one year allowed for the design of the motorway and two and a half years for the construction works. However, the bid was challenged and awarded to a new constructor, the Greek company Aktor, in October 2018.

The rest of the South section was tendered on the same date as well, with both of the two bids awarded to the Turkish company Alsim Alarko: the contract for the segment of 16.3 km between the DN6 road and the CFR Line 902 (near Jilava), called lot 2, was signed in March 2019 and is due to be finished in 2022, while the bid for the segment of 16.9 km between the CFR Line 902 and the A2 motorway, called lot 1, was under challenge procedures until July 2019, with the contract being signed one month later.

On 30 December 2023, the first section of the South Ring opened between DN5 and DN6. On 15 April 2024, the second section of the South Ring opened between DN4 and DN5. Later in 2024, the section between DN4 and the A2 motorway would be opened. And in july 2025, the section between DN6 and the A1 motorway would be opened, completing the south ring.

=== Northern half-ring ===
Initially, in June 2019, 45 km of the Northern half was tendered for auction into three segments, with a fourth lot included later, up to a total of 49.57 km. On 20 September 2023, the contract for the design and execution of the last segment was signed with the Impresa Pizzarotti – Retter Project management association. On 29 November 2023, the first section opened on the A0, between the A3 motorway and DN1. Later in 2025, the section between DN1 and DN2 is opened.

== Openings timeline ==
- The segment of the North Ring between DN1 and A3 motorway opened in November 2023.
- The segment of the South Ring between DN6 and DN5 opened in December 2023.
- The segment of the South Ring between DN5 and DN4 opened in April 2024.
- The segment of the South Ring between DN4 and A2 motorway opened in July 2024.
- The segment of the North Ring between A3 motorway and DN2 opened in December 2024.
- The segment of the South Ring between A1 motorway and DN4 opened in July 2025.
- The segment of the North Ring between DN2 and A2 motorway opened in November 2026.

== Exit list ==
County	Location	km	mi	Destinations	Notes
Giurgiu	Joița	0– 100.8	0.0– 62.6	A 1 – Bucharest West, Pitești	
Giurgiu	Missing connection north-east towards Balotești				
Ilfov	Dragomirești-Vale	3.5	2.2	Short-term parking	
Ilfov	Buftea			DN7 – Chitila	
Ilfov	Buftea			DN1A – Mogoșoaia, Buftea	
Ilfov	Buftea	14.5	9.0	Short-term parking	
Ilfov	Missing connection south-west towards Joița				
Ilfov	Balotești	22.2	13.8	DN1 – Otopeni, Corbeanca, Ploiești	
Ilfov	Balotești	24.3	15.1	Short-term parking	
Ilfov	Tunari	29.4	18.3	Short-term parking	
Ilfov	Ștefăneștii de Jos			A 3 – Bucharest North, Ploiești	Exit for Centrul National de Management Trafic
Ilfov	Afumați	36.3	22.6	Short-term parking	
Ilfov	Afumați	39	24	DN2 – Voluntari, Urziceni, Buzău	
Ilfov	Pantelimon	44.7	27.8	Short-term parking	
Ilfov	Pantelimon	47.6	29.6	DN3 – Pantelimon, Fundulea	Planned exit
Ilfov	Glina	52	32	A 2 – Bucharest East, Constanța	
Ilfov	Glina	55.9	34.7	Short-term parking	
Ilfov	Popești-Leordeni			DN4 – Popești-Leordeni, Oltenița	
Ilfov	Popești-Leordeni	64.6	40.1	Short-term parking	
Ilfov	1 Decembrie			DN5 – Jilava, Giurgiu	
Ilfov	Dărăști-Ilfov	78.1	48.5	Short-term parking	
Ilfov	Bragadiru			DN6 – Bragadiru, Alexandria	
Ilfov	Clinceni	89.45	55.58	Short-term parking	
Ilfov	Ciorogârla	94.9	59.0	Short-term parking	
Giurgiu	Joița	100.8– 0	62.6– 0.0	A 1 – Bucharest West, Pitești	
1.000 mi = 1.609 km; 1.000 km = 0.621 mi: Incomplete access; Unopened

== See also ==
- Roads in Romania
- Transport in Romania
- Highways in Romania
