= DN4 =

Road in Romania

National Road 4
- Drumul Național 4

Route information
- Maintained by Compania Națională de Autostrăzi și Drumuri Naționale din România
- Length: 72 km (45 mi)

Major junctions
- From: Bucharest
- To: Oltenița

Location
- Country: Romania
- Counties: Ilfov, Călărași

Highway system
- Roads in Romania; Highways

DN4 (Romanian: Drumul Național 4) is a national road in Romania which links Bucharest with Oltenița, on the banks of Danube. The road is running north - south and is following the Argeș River.

Outside of Bucharest, the only main intersections between DN4 and other national roads are in Oltenița. The DN41 starts from the municipality, ending in a roundabout with the DN5 near Plopșoru, 10 km north of Giurgiu. Another road, in the same area, links the same city to the DN3 at Călărași and further to the A2 motorway towards Constanța. This national road is known as DN31.

The national road was formerly linked to the Bulgarian border through a ferry, towards Tutrakan, however the ferry was discontinued and as such the road now ends near the Port of Oltenița, one of the largest river ports in Romania.
