= A2 motorway (Romania) =

Motorway in Romania

A2 motorway

- Map of the A2 motorway, as of November 2012

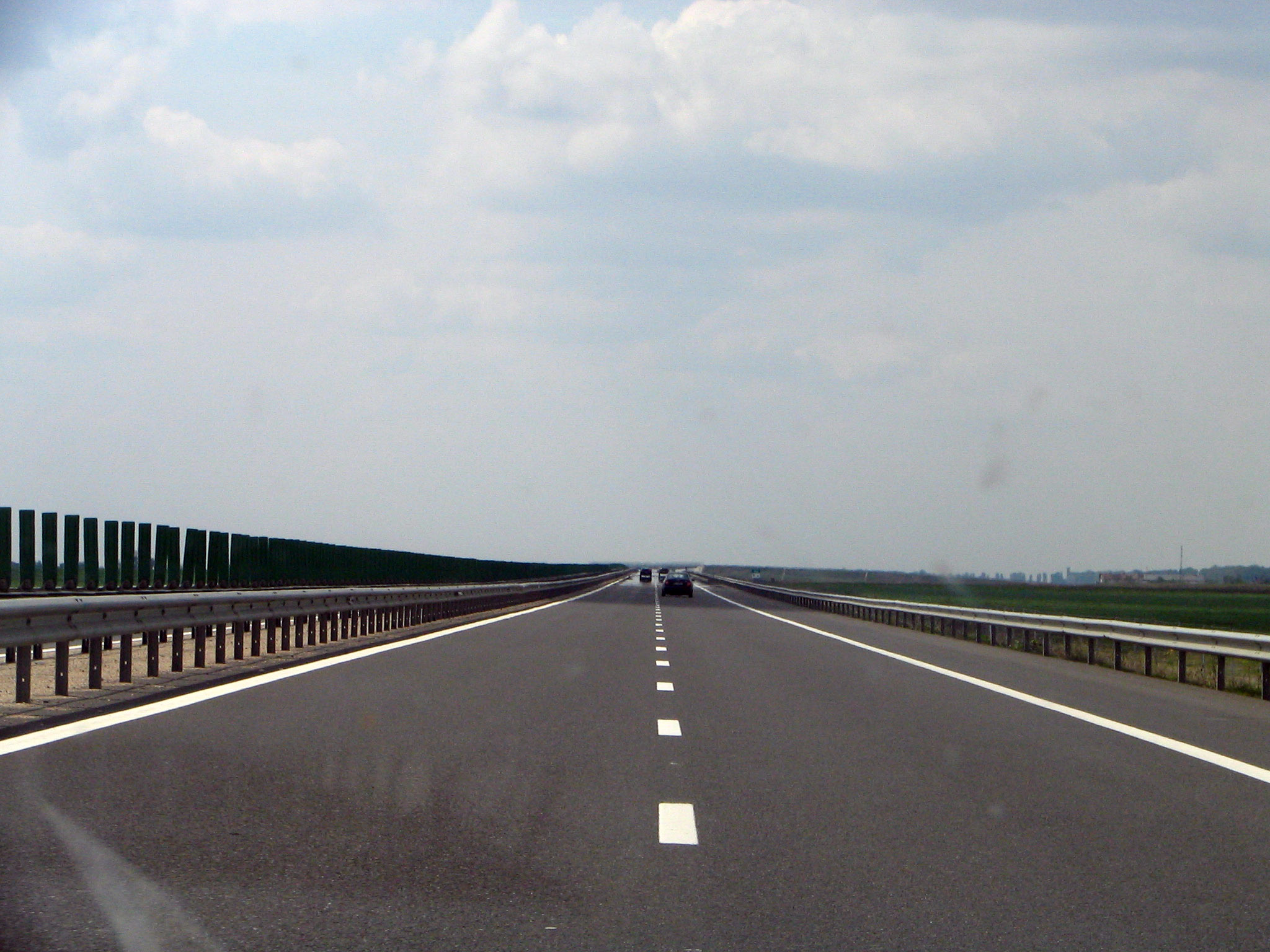

Route information
- Maintained by Compania Națională de Administrare a Infrastructurii Rutiere
- Length: 225 km (140 mi)
- Existed: 1987–present

Major junctions
- West end: Bucharest
- A 0 near Cernica
- East end: A 4 at Constanța

Location
- Country: Romania
- Counties: Ilfov, Călărași, Ialomița, Constanța
- Major cities: Fetești, Cernavodă, Medgidia

Highway system
- Roads in Romania; Highways
← A 1	→ A 3

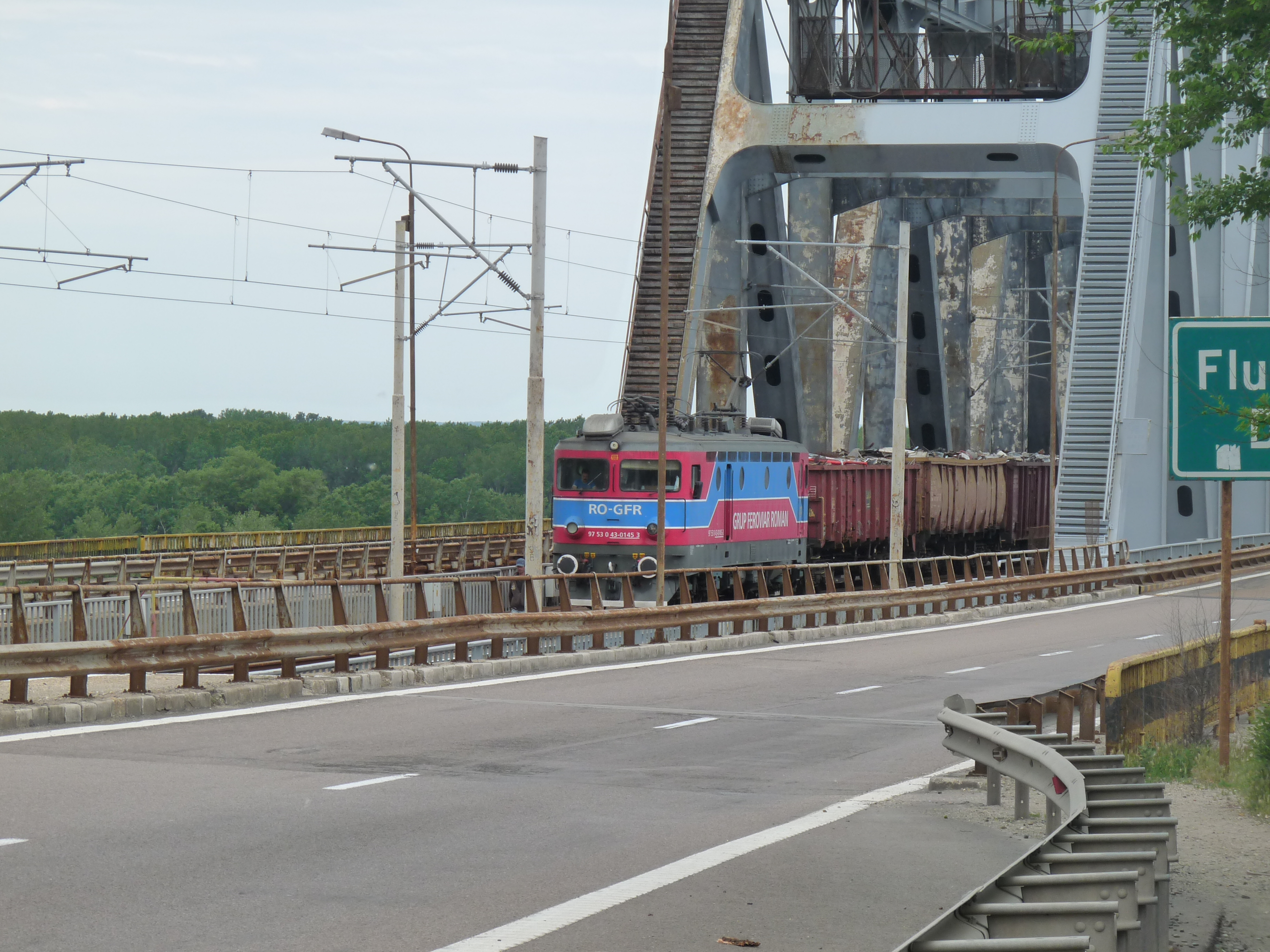
CFR line 800 running parallel with the A2 motorway at Cernavodă

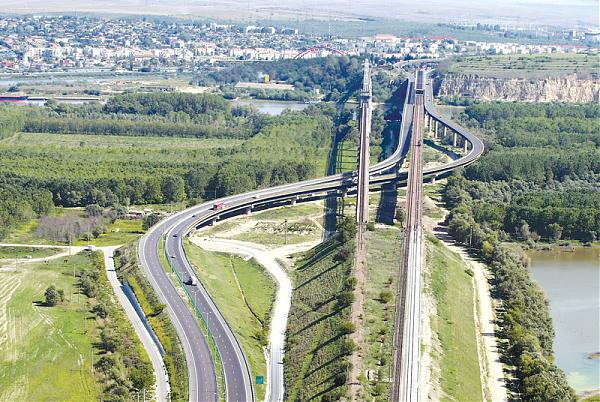
Oldest section of the motorway, Cernavodă bridges system (over Danube) inaugurated in 1987 (birds eye view)

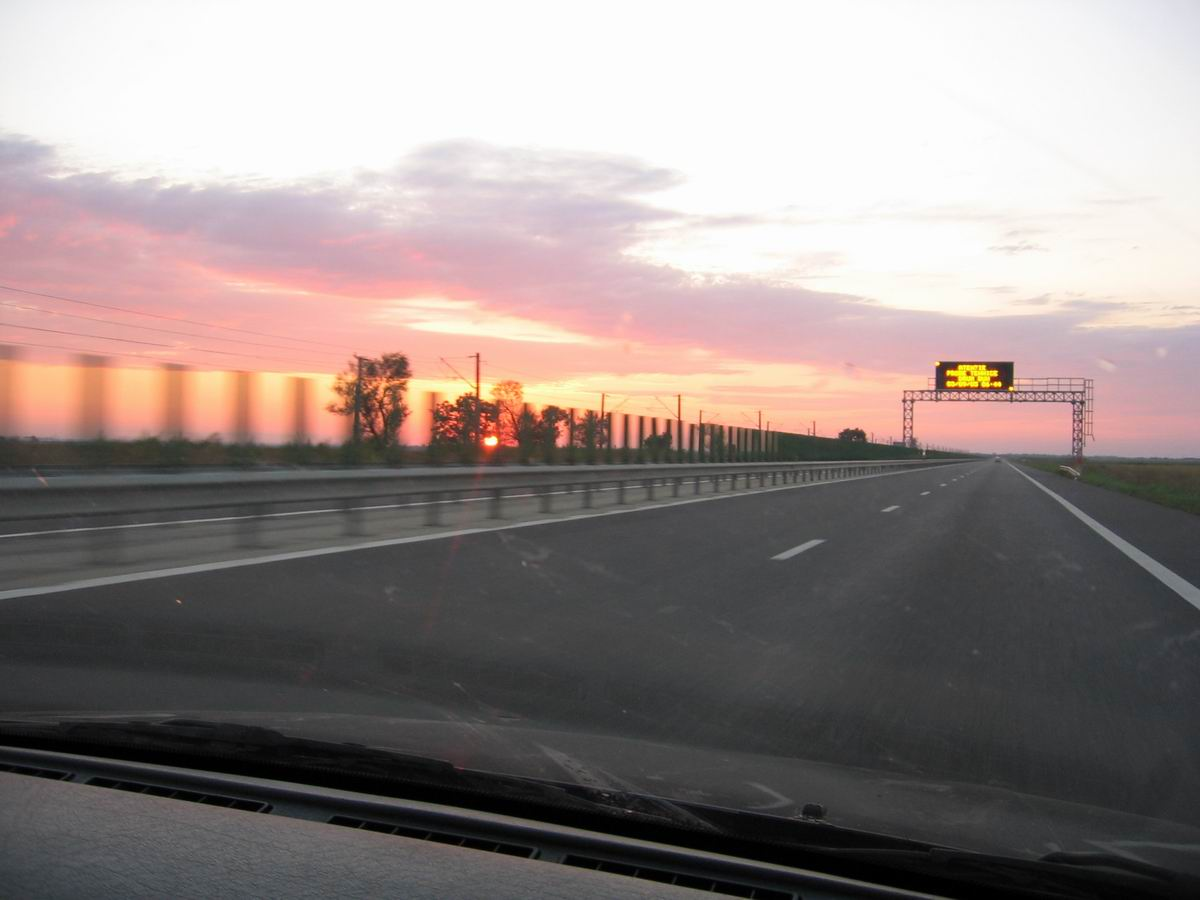
A2 motorway runs parallel with CFR Line 800 for many kilometers

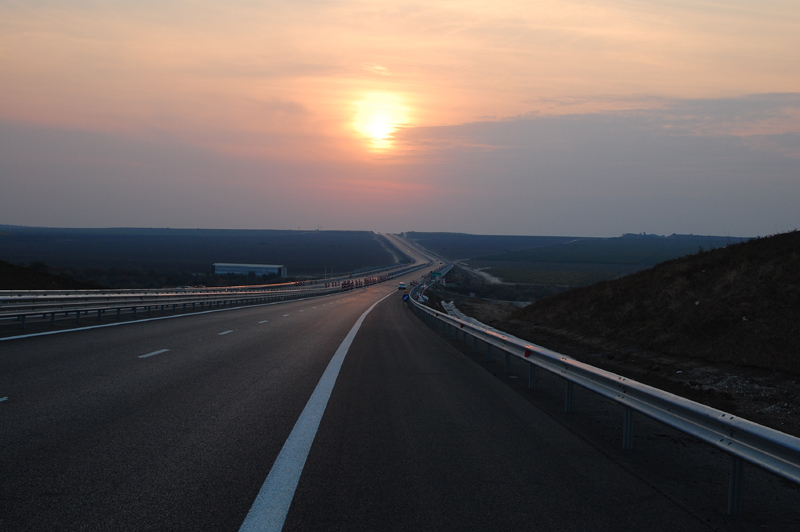
A2 motorway between Medgidia and Constanța

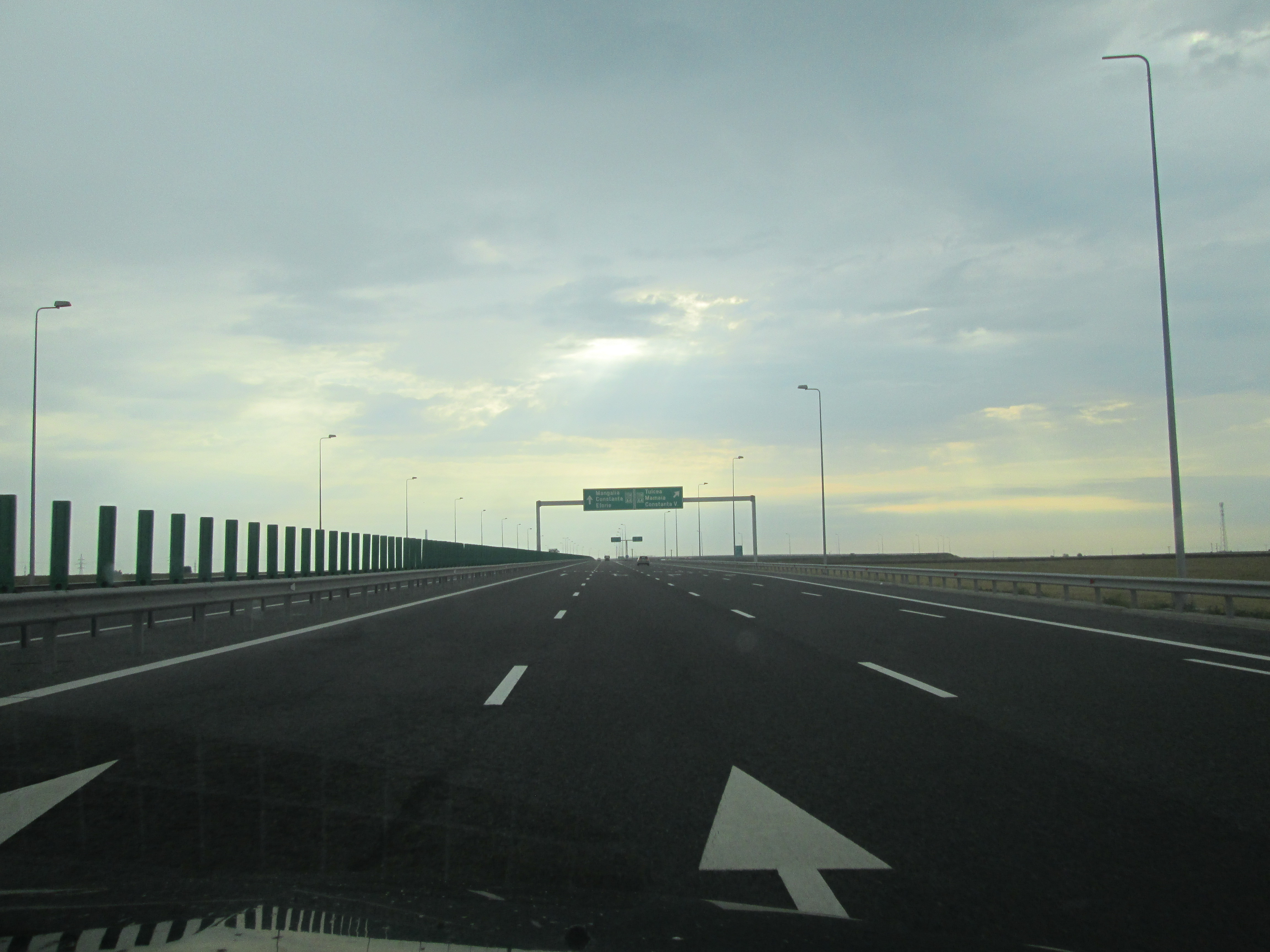
Interchange with A4, seen approaching from Medgidia

The A2 motorway (Romanian: Autostrada A2), also known as The Motorway of the Sun (Romanian: Autostrada Soarelui), is a motorway in Romania which links Bucharest with Constanța, a city-port on the shore of the Black Sea, where it merges after an interchange into the A4 motorway. It is 206 km long, and has been operational on its entire length since November 2012.

== History ==
The construction of the motorway between Bucharest and Constanța began in the communist era during Nicolae Ceaușescu's regime. The first section, from Fetești to Cernavodă (about 18 km), was opened on 21 November 1987, simultaneous to the new railway bridge and underwent a major rehabilitation in 2003. It crosses the Balta Ialomiței island and includes the Cernavodă Bridge complex system of motorway and railway bridges and viaducts over the Danube and one of its branches at Cernavodă. The motorway bridge passes under the historical railway bridge built by Anghel Saligny in 1895, while the new railway in use today separates the motorway roadways.

After the fall of the communism in 1989, construction continued for a short period, but it was finally stopped in 1993 due to lack of financial resources. When it was completed, it differed from the original plans from the 70s. The original plan of the A2 motorway envisaged a route running northwards through Urziceni and Slobozia, while the current route of the motorway runs eastwards in a straight line towards Fetești. Construction continued after 1998, the motorway being completed in late 2012.

The sector from Bucharest to Fetești crosses the Bărăgan Plain and was built between 2001 and 2007. It was split into four sections. The first section from Bucharest to Fundulea (26.5 km) was built by the Romanian company Romis and is surfaced with concrete slabs. The second section from Fundulea to Lehliu (29.2 km) was built by a Turkish joint venture between Yuksel, Makimsar and Ener, while the third section from Lehliu to Drajna (41.6 km) was built by the French company Colas. The three sections were completed in 2004. The fourth, from Drajna to Fetești (36.8 km), was built by a joint venture between Astaldi, Max Bögl and CCCF, and was completed in 2007, receiving financial support from the ISPA funds.

The sector from Cernavodă to Constanța (51.3 km) runs across the Dobruja Plateau and was built between 2009 and 2012, receiving financial resources from the European Union's Cohesion Fund and from the European Investment Bank. It was built by a joint venture between Astaldi and Max Bögl, and was completed in late 2012. The section from Cernavodă to Medgidia was initially awarded to the French company Colas, but the contract was terminated in April 2011, because of delays in the construction process. It was subsequently awarded to the new constructor in September 2011.

The total distance between Bucharest and Constanța on the motorway is approximately 206 km. It includes a 3.8 km link segment at the eastern end, that was part of the construction contract for the A4 motorway, which serves as the Constanța bypass. It has seven exits and ten rest areas on each carriageway, six being served by filling stations. There is one toll gate along the route, at Fetești (km 144), where a tax is charged for crossing the Danube bridges.

During summer, heavy traffic (maximum permissible weight over 7.5 t) is forbidden to drive on the motorway on weekends (including Friday) at daylight hours (from 6 A.M. to 12 A.M.).

== Openings timeline ==
- In 21 November 1987, the 17.2 km segment Fetești – Cernavodă was opened for traffic. The segment was closed for traffic again in September 2006 for complete rebuilding and reopened in 2007.
- On 4 June 2004, two segments opened for traffic: Bucharest – Fundulea (26.5 km) and Fundulea – Lehliu (29.2 km).
- In November 2004, the 42 km segment Lehliu – Drajna was opened for traffic.
- In June 2006, the 17.2 km segment Fetești – Cernavodă was re-opened for traffic, after major rehabilitation works.
- Between 1 July and 15 September 2006, the 36.8 km segment Drajna – Fetești temporarily opened for traffic in both ways but only on one carriageway.
- On 1 May 2007, the 36.8 km segment Drajna – Fetești was re-opened for traffic.
- On 29 July 2011, the Murfatlar – Constanța segment (21 km, including a part of A4) was inaugurated (initially, on two of the total four lanes).
- On 30 September 2011, the Murfatlar – Constanța segment was completed and opened on both carriageways.
- On 19 July 2012, the Cernavodă – Medgidia segment (20.5 km) was opened for traffic on a single carriageway, and the Medgidia – Murfatlar segment (16.3 km) was opened on both carriageways.
- On 29 November 2012, the Cernavodă – Medgidia segment (20.5 km) was opened for traffic on both carriageways.

== Exit list ==
County	Location	km	mi	Destinations	Notes
City of Bucharest		11	6.8	Theodor Pallady Boulevard	Western terminus. Introductory path of the A2. Distance is measured from the Kilometer Zero monument in Bucharest.
City of Bucharest		12	7.5	DNCB (Centura București, Bucharest Ring Road)	
Ilfov	Cernica	14	8.7	A 0 – Bucharest East	Opened in 2024
Ilfov	Cernica	18	11	DJ301 / DC55 – Cernica, Bălănceanca	Opened in 2015.
Ilfov	Brănești	22	14	DJ100 – Brănești, Fundeni	Opened in 2021.
Călărași	Fundulea	35	22	DN3 – Fundulea	
Călărași	Sărulești	48	30	Rest area: OMV	
Călărași	Lehliu Gară	64	40	DN3 – Lehliu Gară	
Călărași	Lehliu Gară	66	41	Rest area: Petrom	
Călărași	Dor Mărunt	74	46	Parking	
Călărași	Vâlcelele	88	55	Rest area: Rompetrol	
Călărași	Dragalina	98	61	Parking	
Călărași	Drajna	105	65	DN3A / DN21 – Slobozia, Călărași	
Călărași	Perișoru	111	69	Rest area: OMV	
Călărași	Perișoru	120	75	Parking	
Călărași	Borcea	131	81	Parking	
Ialomița	Fetești	139	86	Rest area: Rompetrol	
Ialomița	Fetești	142	88	DN3B – Fetești	Rebuilt in 2007.
Ialomița	Fetești	144	89	Toll booth	
Ialomița	Fetești	145	90	Fetești Bridge	The Fetești Bridge crosses over the Borcea branch of the Danube.
Ialomița	Fetești	146	91	U-turn exit	
Constanța	Cernavodă	157	98	U-turn exit	Eastbound only.
Constanța	Cernavodă	158	98	Cernavodă Bridge	The Cernavodă Bridge crosses over the Danube.
Constanța	Cernavodă	160	99	DN22C – Cernavodă, Murfatlar	Reconfigured as exit in 2012.
Constanța	Medgidia	192	119	DJ381 – Medgidia, Murfatlar, Ostrov	
Constanța	Medgidia	196	122	Rest area: MOL	MOL filling station opened in 2022.
Constanța	Constanța	205	127	Parking	
Constanța	Constanța	212	132	A 4 – Constanța	Eastern terminus. Road continues as A4 to Tulcea, Constanța and Port of Constanța, Mangalia, Vama Veche (border with Bulgaria).
1.000 mi = 1.609 km; 1.000 km = 0.621 mi: Tolled

== See also ==
- Roads in Romania
- Transport in Romania
- Cernavodă Bridge
