= Bucharest–Giurgiu Motorway =

Planned motorway in Romania

A5 motorway

Route information
- Maintained by Compania Națională de Autostrăzi și Drumuri Naționale din România
- Length: 0 km (0 mi; 0 ft) 51 km (32 mi) (planned length)

Major junctions
- From: Bucharest
- A 0 near Jilava
- To: A 7 near Giurgiu (border with Bulgaria)

Location
- Country: Romania

Highway system
- Roads in Romania; Highways
← A 4	→ A 6

The Bucharest–Giurgiu Motorway (Romanian: Autostrada București–Giurgiu), labelled A5, is a proposed motorway in the southern part of Romania, located in the historical region of Muntenia and running along the Pan-European Corridor IX. Estimated to be 51 km (32 mi) long, it will upon completion connect the capital city of Bucharest to Giurgiu, where the motorway will likely connect to Bulgaria's Veliko Tarnovo–Ruse motorway (A7), which further connects to the Hemus motorway (A2), thus serving as a motorway connection between Bucharest and Sofia, the capital city of Bulgaria.

== History and status ==
The status of what could be the A5 motorway is unclear, with construction works on the motorway unlikely to begin before 2030, especially since the adjacent road which the motorway would double, the National Road 5 (DN5), was upgraded throughout the 2000s to a road with dual carriageway and at-grade junctions without a hard shoulder (emergency lane). Moreover, a new expressway (termed DN5D) that would bypass the city of Giurgiu in the east (about 6 km long) opened in 2021, but this serves only as a connection to the existing Giurgiu border checkpoint and the Friendship Bridge over the Danube. Regardless, building the A5 motorway is only a long-term plan for the Romanian government.

In the past, the Brașov - Bacău (Răcăciuni) motorway (162 km) used to be labelled A5. It was eventually merged with the Sibiu - Brașov motorway (120 km), forming a 282-kilometre long A13 motorway. The route number A5 was since reserved for an eventual motorway between Bucharest and Giurgiu.

== See also ==
- Giurgiu East bypass - a road built to expressway-like standards designated the DN5D
- Roads in Romania
- Transport in Romania
