= Agriculture in Romania =

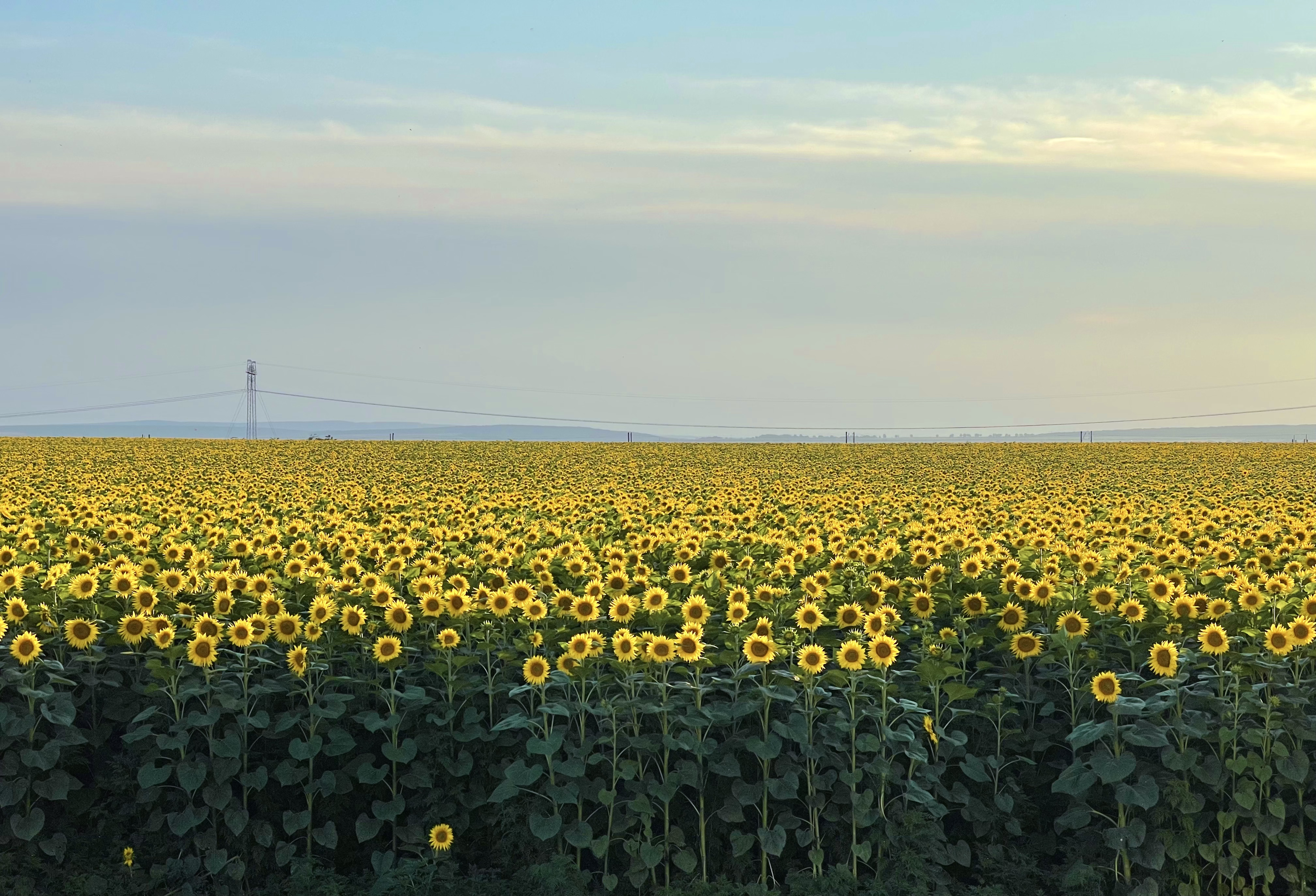
Sunflower field in Romania

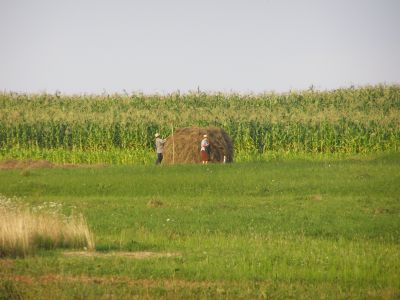
Farmers working in Transylvania in 2006

Agriculture in Romania is an important part of the economy of Romania, with almost 13.5 million hectares (ha) being used for agriculture. Farming is a common occupation in the rural areas of the country, and the majority of the farms in Romania are small farms of less than 5 hectares.

Romania is the biggest producer of sunflower seeds, honey and plums in the European Union as of 2023. In 2022, Romania was the world's second producer of plums, and was among the world's top 20 biggest producers of sunflower seeds, rapeseed, cherry, maize, wheat, barley and soybean.

Agriculture summed up about 4.3% of GDP in 2019, down from 12.6% in 2004. In 2023, 23% of the Romanian labour force were employed in agriculture, the highest percentage in the European Union.

Agricultural mechanization is relatively poor compared to Western Europe. In some regions of the country, farmers still use horse-drawn agriculture tools and rely on animal power. In 2009, while in Western Europe tractors were replaced after 3,000-4,000 hours of use, in Romania they sometimes lasted up to 12,000 hours.

The main problems encountered by Romanian agriculturists are a lack of major investments in agriculture, due to difficulty in accessing available funds, fragmentation and erosion of soil, property-related lawsuits and obsolete technology. Several major companies have entered the Romanian market, including Smithfield Foods, Cargill, Bunge, Glencore, Lactalis, and Meggle AG. These companies have since invested hundreds of millions of euros in Romania.

== Production ==
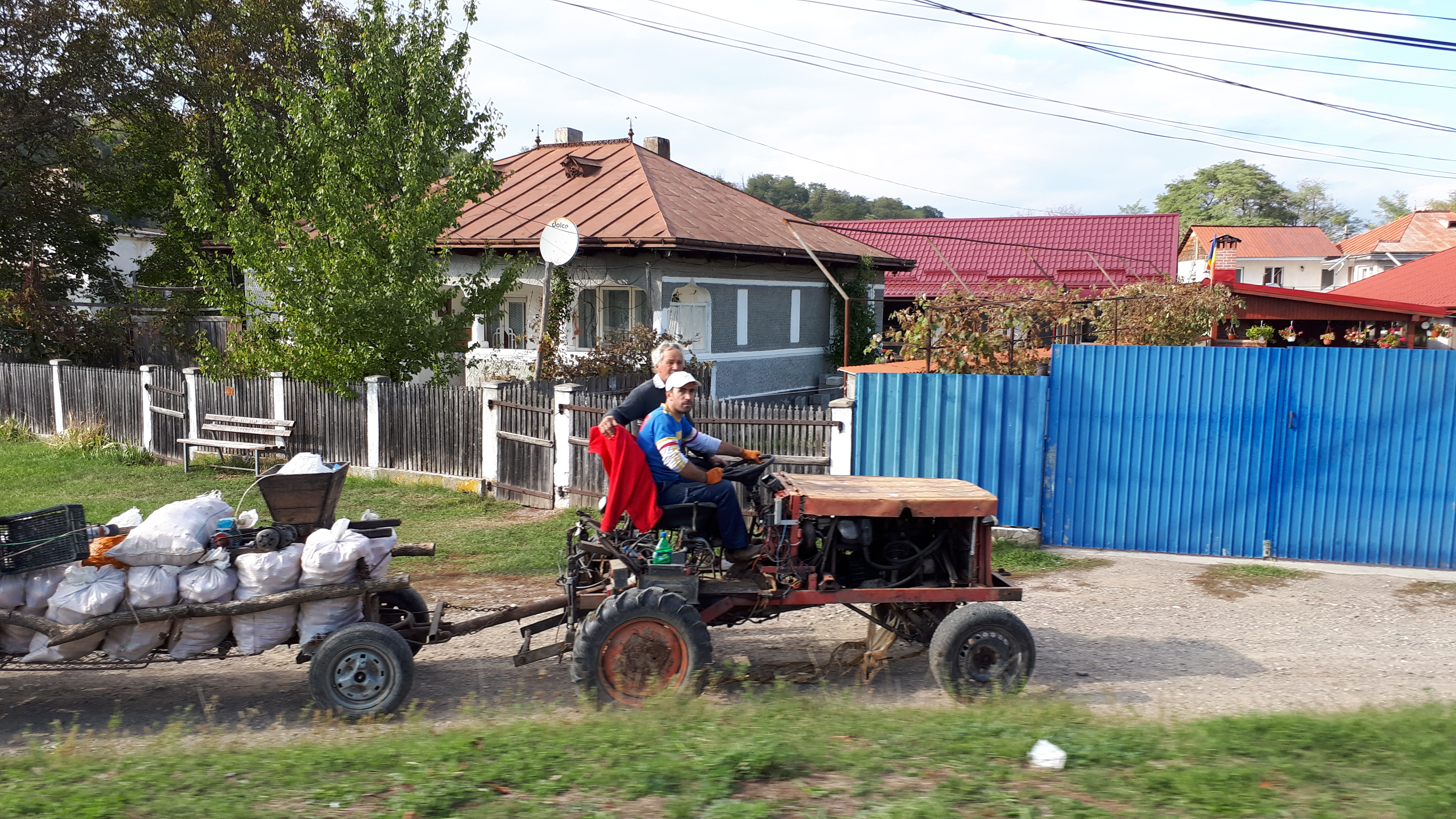
Farmers at Tescani village in Bacau County, October 2017

According to the National Statistics Institute, in 2006 991,000 ha of sun-flower and 191,000 ha of soybean were cultivated. Cereal production in 2006 stood at 15.1 million tons, including 5.3 million tons of wheat and 8.6 million tons of maize. In 2007, a severe drought destroyed over 60% of crops. Wheat production subsequently fell to 3 million tons, and prices fell 25%. Analysts claimed it was the worst harvest since 1940.

Production year	2000	2001	2002	2003	2004	2005	2006	2007	2008	2009	2010	2011
Wheat	4434	7735	4421	2479	7812	7340	5526	3044	7181	5202	5587	7192
Potatoes	3469	3997	4077	3947	4230	3738	4015	3712	3649	4004	3258	4113
Sunflower	720	823	1002	1506	1557	1340	1526	546	1169	1098	1264	1864
Tomatoes	-	651	658	818	805	379	571	407	536	470	414	560
Apples	-	507	491	811	1097	611	579	472	455	513	543	624

Cereal, fruit and vegetable production: (thousands of tons)

Through the Common Agricultural Policy, Romania will receive 14.5 billion euros between 2007 and 2013, according to statements made by the World Bank.

Romania produced in 2018:

- 18.6 million tons of maize (9th largest producer in the world);
- 10.1 million tons of wheat (16th largest producer in the world);
- 3 million tons of sunflower seeds (4th largest producer in the world, only behind Ukraine, Russia and Argentina);
- 3 million tons of potatoes;
- 1.8 million tons of barley;
- 1.6 million tons of rapeseed;
- 1.1 million tons of grapes (17th largest producer in the world);
- 1 million tons of cabbage;
- 978 thousand tons of sugar beets, which are used to produce sugar and ethanol;
- 842 thousand tons of plums (2nd largest producer in the world, only behind China);
- 742 thousand tons of tomatoes;
- 643 thousand tons of apples;
- 521 thousand tons of watermelons;
- 465 thousand tons of soy;
- 383 thousand tons of oats;

In addition to smaller productions of other agricultural products.

== Romanian agricultural research ==
Agricultural research in Romania developed mainly through the Agronomical Research Institute (founded 1927), and post-World War II through its successor, the Research Institute for Cereals and Industrial Crops. Some of the main Romanian agricultural scientists include Ion Ionescu de la Brad, Gheorghe Ionescu-Sisești, Nichifor Ceapoiu, Zoe Țapu, Alexandru-Viorel Vrânceanu, Cristian Hera, Nicolae N. Săulescu, and others.

== Genetically modified crops ==
Genetically modified soybean was legal to cultivate and sell until entry into the EU in 2007, whereupon they were banned. This resulted in an immediate withdrawal of 70% of the soybean hectares in 2008 and a trade deficit of €117.4m for purchase of replacement products. Farmer sentiment is very much in favour of relegalisation.
