= Pintilie =

Pintilie is a Romanian-language surname most encountered in the Maramureș and Moldavian dialects; it is a derivative or variant of Pantelimon, which designates Saint Pantaleon. On its own, the surname may refer to:

- Adina Pintilie (b. 1980), Romanian filmmaker and screenwriter
- Gheorghe Pintilie (1902–1985), Soviet and Romanian intelligence official and political assassin
- Ilie Pintilie (1903–1940), Romanian communist railroad worker and activist
- Lucian Pintilie (1933–2018), Romanian film director and screenwriter
