= DN3 =

Road in Romania

National Road 3
- Drumul Național 3

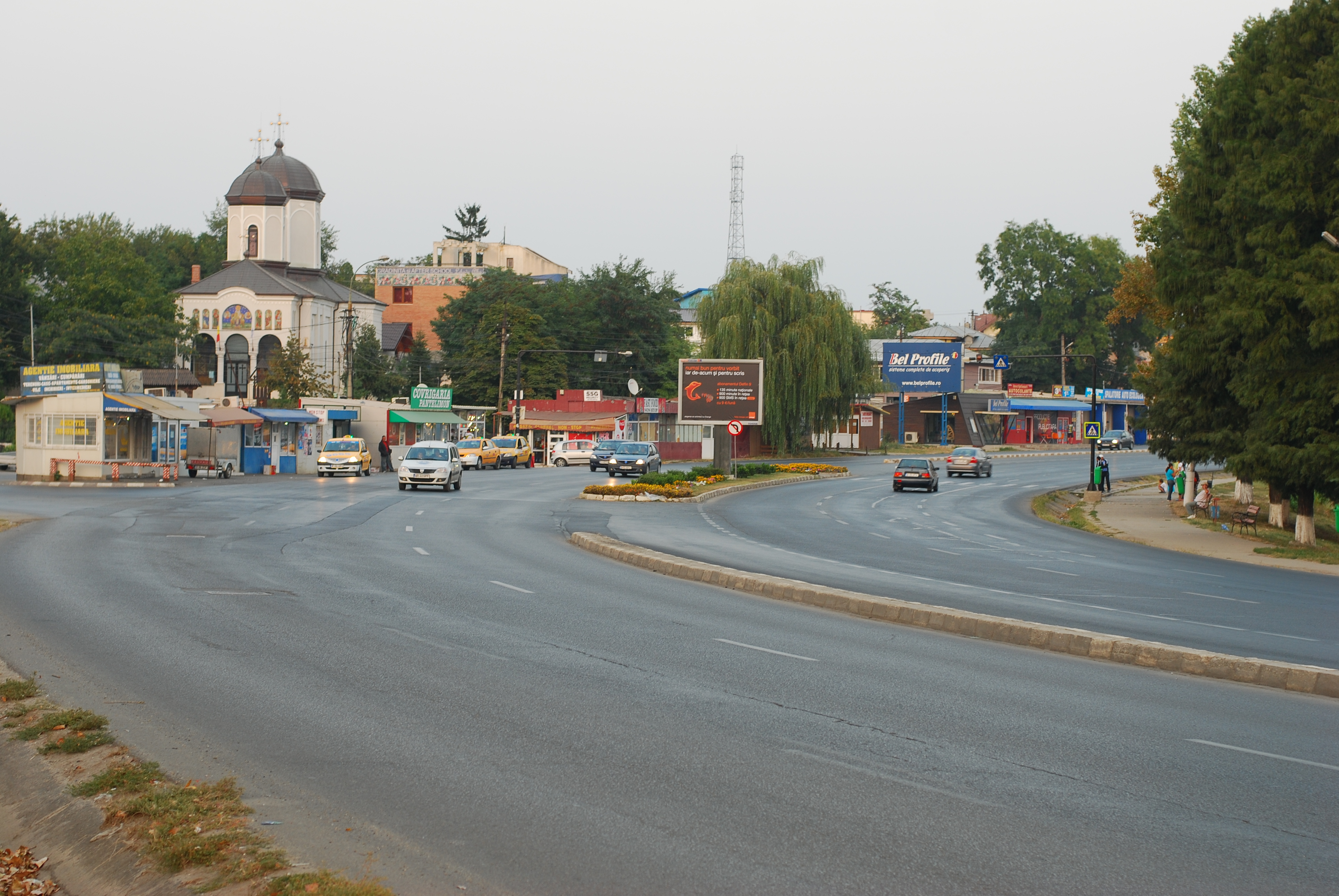

Route information
- Maintained by Compania Națională de Autostrăzi și Drumuri Naționale din România
- Length: 258.8 km (160.8 mi)

Major junctions
- From: Bucharest
- To: Constanța

Location
- Country: Romania
- Counties: Ilfov, Călărași, Constanța
- Major cities: Fundulea, Lehliu-Gară, Călărași, Băneasa, Murfatlar

Highway system
- Roads in Romania; Highways

DN3 (Romanian: Drumul Național 3) is a national road in Romania, originally linking Bucharest and Constanța via Călărași, but no longer serving this purpose for more than four decades. The road is not complete, in the sense of having a gap across the Danube between Călărași and Ostrov. The gap is covered by ferry-boats operated by two private companies every 30–35 minutes during the day and every 45–90 minutes during the night.

When designated as a trunk route, in the early 1960s, this was the shortest road between Bucharest and Constanta, as, at that time, there were no road bridges connecting Dobrudja with the rest of Romania (the King Carol I Bridge at Cernavodă being rail only).

As road bridges over the Danube were constructed, the first one in 1970 at Giurgeni – Vadu Oii, and the second one at Fetești–Cernavodă (Cernavodă Bridge) in the late 1980s, the road lost almost all importance. Currently, the main road connection between Bucharest and Constanta is done via the A2 motorway, opened between 2004 and 2009, while Călărași is served through an exit from the same motorway at Drajna.

Currently, the route is very sparsely used between Bucharest and Călărași, mainly by commuters between Bucharest and its suburbs of Pantelimon and Brănești, as well as by villagers along its route, as a feeder to A2. Between Ostrov and Constanta, the road provides a vital link between southwestern Dobrudja and the rest of the country. However, as southwestern Dobrudja is sparsely populated, with no notable towns or cities (Ostrov being the biggest, at slightly over 5000 inhabitants), that stretch of the road is sparsely used as well. DN3 connects with the Bulgarian road network through a border crossing facility at Ostrov – Silistra (Bulgaria), immediately after the ferry landing. Thus, if counting the Călărași-Ostrov ferry as part of the DN3 road, it can be said that one of the main remaining roles of DN3 is providing a connection between Călărași and Silistra. Note that as of 2009, there is also a direct, newly built Călărași – Silistra ferry, but is far slower (takes almost 2 hours to cross the 8 km distance) and far more infrequent.
