= A4 motorway (Romania) =

Motorway in Romania

A4 motorway

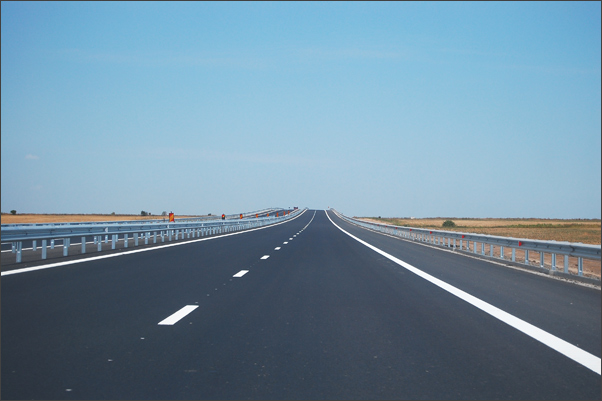

Route information
- Maintained by Compania Națională de Autostrăzi și Drumuri Naționale din România
- Length: 21.8 km (13.5 mi) 60 km (37 mi) planned (approx.)
- Existed: 2011–present

Major junctions
- North end: Ovidiu
- A 2 near Constanța
- South end: Vama Veche (border with Bulgaria)

Location
- Country: Romania
- Major cities: Constanța, Mangalia

Highway system
- Roads in Romania; Highways
← A 3	→ A 5

The interchange between the A2 motorway and the A4 motorway

The A4 motorway (Romanian: Autostrada A4) is a motorway in Romania that serves as a bypass for the city of Constanța, between Ovidiu and the Port of Constanța, connecting with the A2 motorway via an interchange southwest of the city. It is 22 km long and is planned to be extended to approximately 60 kilometers, stretching further south to the Bulgarian border south of Mangalia, along the western Black Sea coast. The motorway is part of an extension of the Pan-European Corridor IV, that will be connecting with the Bulgarian city of Varna.

== Description ==
The contract for the construction of the stretch of motorway between Ovidiu and Lazu was awarded in September 2008 to the joint venture between the Italian company Astaldi and the Spanish company FCC Construction, and was due to be completed until November 2011.

A new bridge was built over the Danube – Black Sea Canal, downstream of the Agigea lock, in order to allow access to the busier southern terminal of the Port of Constanța directly from the motorway. Works began in July 2010, and were planned to be completed in 2014.

The bypass was initially built with funds from the state budget, but in the end of 2014, the European Commission awarded funds for the construction from the Cohesion Fund.

The northern end is planned to be extended with an expressway through Tulcea and ending in Brăila, including Brăila Bridge over Danube, that would be designated the "DEx8". As for the southern end, it is planned that tender procedures begin in 2023 for the segment between Agigea and 23 August (c. 29 km), also termed the "Techirghiol Alternative", that would bypass Eforie and its surrounding area. This particular project would involve a reconfiguration of the junction with A2 in order to provide access to the new motorway segment, as well as to nearby Cumpăna.

== Openings timeline ==
- 29 July 2011: Constanța West (interchange with A2) – Lazu segment (about 5 km).
- 30 September 2011: DN3 interchange – Constanța West interchange (3 km).
- 19 July 2012: Ovidiu – DN3 interchange (11 km).
- 12 July 2013: Lazu – Port of Constanța segment (2 km).

== Exit list ==
County	Location	km	mi	Destinations	Notes
Constanța	Ovidiu	0	0.0	DN22 / DN2A – Ovidiu, Mamaia, Constanța Airport	Northern terminus Opened July 2012
Constanța	Constanța	3	1.9	Short-term parking	
Constanța	Constanța	5	3.1	DC89 – Poiana, Palazu Mare	Opened January 2022
Constanța	Constanța	10	6.2	DN3 – Constanța West, Valu lui Traian	Opened September 2011
Constanța	Constanța	12	7.5	A 2 – Cernavodă, Bucharest	Opened July 2011
Constanța	Agigea	19	12	DN39 – Constanța South, Eforie, Mangalia	Opened July 2011
Constanța	Agigea	21	13	– Port of Constanța	Southern terminus Opened July 2013
1.000 mi = 1.609 km; 1.000 km = 0.621 mi
