= Zoe Țapu =

Romanian agronomist (1934–2013)

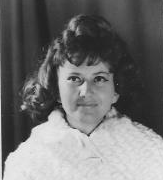
- Born: 29 April 1934; Ploiești, Romania
- Died: 11 February 2013 (aged 78); Ploiești, Romania
- Education: University of Agronomic Sciences and Veterinary Medicine, Bucharest
- Known for: Semi-dwarf winter durum wheat
- Awards: Ion Ionescu de la Brad Prize of the Romanian Academy.
- Scientific career
- Fields: Agronomy
- Workplaces: National Agricultural Research and Development Institute, Fundulea

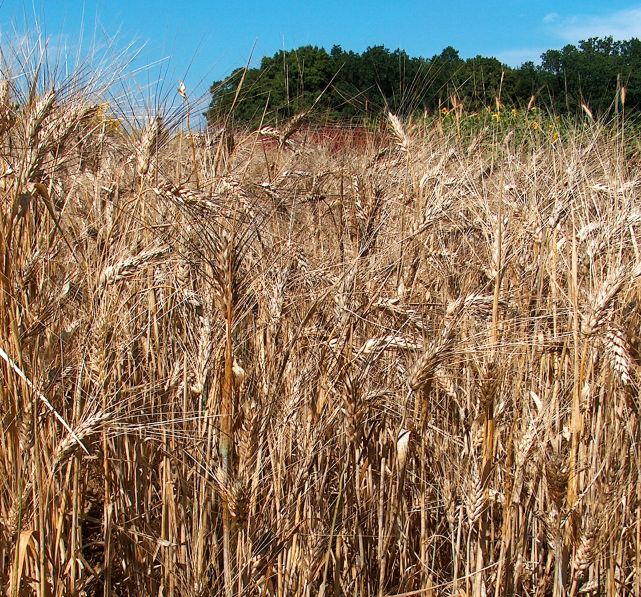
Durum wheat (Triticum durum)

Zoe Țapu (29 April 1934 – 11 February 2013) was a Romanian agronomist who created an original variety of durum wheat, adapted to the climate in Central and Eastern Europe and other similar regions of the world. She was described as a pioneer of durum wheat breeding in Romania.

== Biography ==
She was born in Ploiesti, Romania and graduated from the University of Agronomic Sciences and Veterinary Medicine in Bucharest, earning the doctoral degree in agronomic sciences in 1974.

Since 1957 she worked at the newly founded Institute for Maize Breeding, and then at the Research Institute for Cereals and Industrial Crops, from 1962 to 1990, when she retired. In 1980 she received the Ion Ionescu de la Brad Prize of the Romanian Academy for her research on transgressive heredity in winter wheat. She died from heart failure in Ploiești on 11 February 2013.

== Scientific achievements ==
Proving the possibility of obtaining high yield cultivars from parents with low productivity (through heterosis), between 1967 and 1989, Zoe Țapu developed a research program for improving winter durum wheat, in order to obtain cultivars with fall resistance and high yield, using height-reduction genes from summer durum developed at the International Maize and Wheat Improvement Center in Mexico. In order to achieve that, she used dwarf plants from CIMMYT, which survived to a mild winter, back-crossing them with Romanian durum wheat varieties. Repeated selection for cold resistance of semi-dwarf variants led to the creation of the first semi-dwarf winter durum wheat varieties, Topaz (1977) and Rodur (1984). This new type of wheat set the ground for further progress in durum wheat breeding in many countries.

== Patented wheat varieties ==
- Dacia (1971) T. Mureșan, A. Iazagi, N. Ceapoiu, N. Eustațiu, Clemența Miclea, C. Țapu, Zoe Țapu
- Excelsior (1971) T. Mureșan, A. Iazagi, N. Ceapoiu, N. Eustațiu, Clemența Miclea, C. Țapu, Zoe Țapu
- Iulia (1974) N. Ceapoiu, N. Eustațiu, C. Țapu, Zoe Țapu, G. Ittu, M. Ionescu-Cojocaru, Floare Negulescu, T. Mureșan, A. Iazagi, Elena Oproiu, C. Milică
- Ceres (1974) N. Ceapoiu, N. Eustațiu, C. Țapu, Zoe Țapu, G. Ittu, M. Ionescu-Cojocaru, Floare Negulescu, T. Mureșan, A. Iazagi, Elena Oproiu, C. Milică
- Ileana (1974) N. Ceapoiu, N. Eustațiu, C. Țapu, Zoe Țapu, G. Ittu, M. Ionescu-Cojocaru, Floare Negulescu, T. Mureșan, A. Iazagi, Elena Oproiu, C. Milică
- Diana (1976) N. Ceapoiu, N. Eustațiu, C. Țapu, Zoe Țapu, G. Ittu, M. Ionescu-Cojocaru, Floare Negulescu, T. Mureșan, A. Iazagi, Elena Oproiu, C. Milică
- Doina (1977) N. Ceapoiu, N. Eustațiu, C. Țapu, Zoe Țapu, G. Ittu, M. Ionescu-Cojocaru, Floare Negulescu
- Topaz (1977) Zoe Țapu
- Rodur (1984) Zoe Țapu
- Pandur (1997) Zoe Țapu, P. Mustatea, N. Săulescu, G. Ittu, Mariana Ittu

== See also ==
- Cecil Salmon
- Green Revolution
- Norman Borlaug
- Orville Vogel
