= Dragalina, Călărași =

Dragalina
- Commune
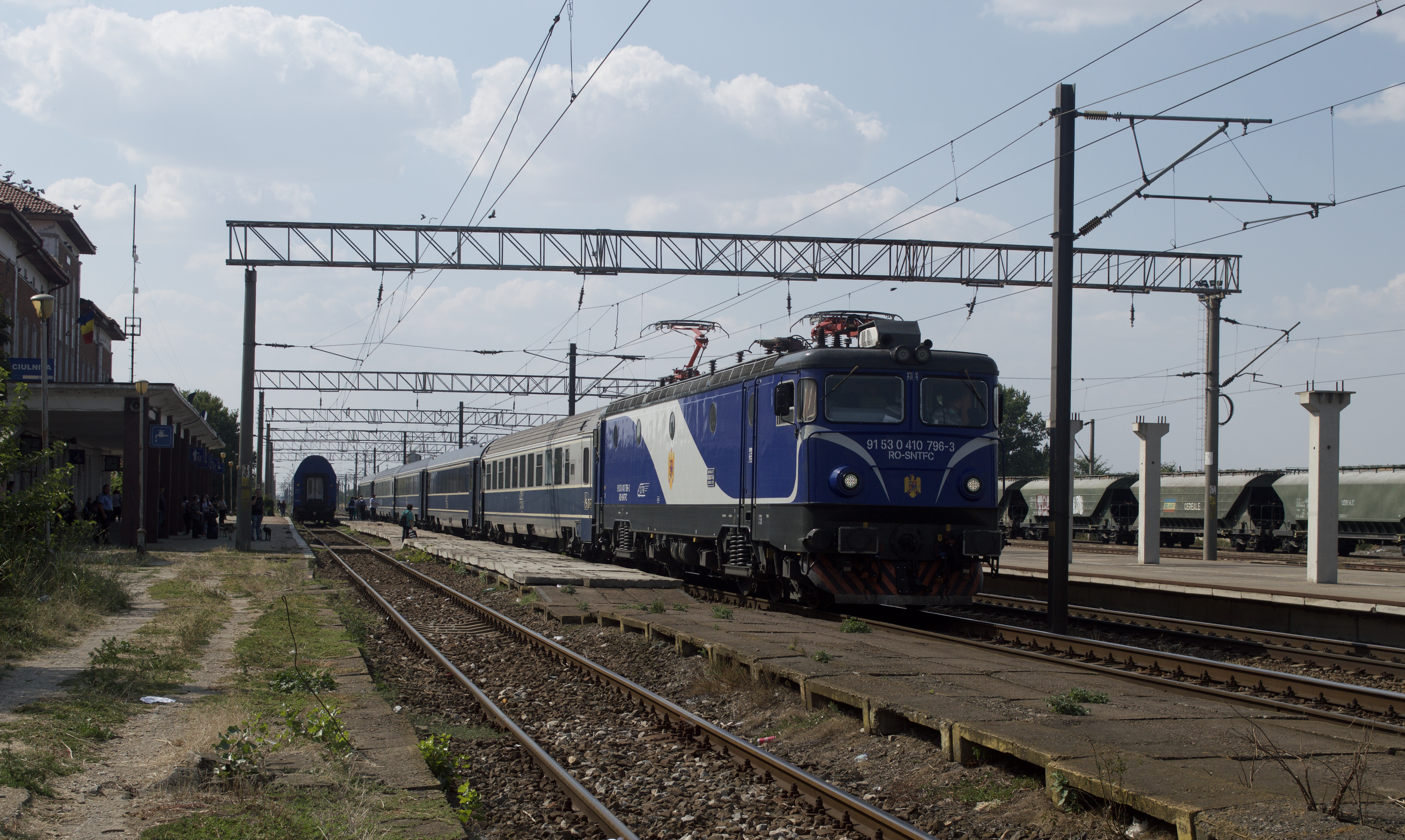
- Ciulnița train station in Dragalina

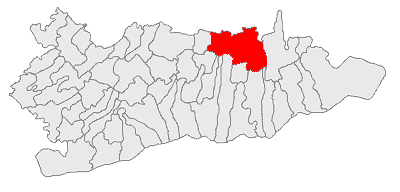
- Location in Călărași County

- Location in Romania
- Coordinates: 44°26′N 27°20′E
- Country: Romania
- County: Călărași

Government
  - Mayor (2024–2028): Marian Gabriel Stanciu (PNL)
- Area: 172.69 km^{2} (66.68 sq mi)
- Elevation: 42 m (138 ft)
- Population (2021-12-01): 7,848
  - Density: 45.45/km^{2} (117.7/sq mi)
- Time zone: UTC+02:00 (EET)
  - Summer (DST): UTC+03:00 (EEST)
- Postal code: 917080
- Area code: +(40) x42
- Vehicle reg.: CL
- Website: comunadragalina.ro

Dragalina is a commune in Călărași County, Muntenia, Romania, named after the Romanian general Ion Dragalina. It is composed of three villages: Constantin Brâncoveanu, Dragalina, and Drajna Nouă.

The commune is located in the northern part of the county, about 31 km (19 mi) from the county seat, Călărași, on the border with Ialomița County. The Ciulnița train station serves the CFR Main Line 800, which connects the national capital, Bucharest, with the Black Sea coast. The train station, built in 1886, is named after Ciulnița commune, which was the nearest locality at the time.

Historical population
Year	Pop.	±%
2002	8,767	—
2011	8,537	−2.6%
2021	7,848	−8.1%
Source: Census data

At the 2011 census, the population of Dragalina was 8,537. At the 2021 census, the population had decreased to 7,848.
