= Gheorghe Leonte =

Romania international rugby union player

- Born: 12 February 1963 (age 63) Fetești, Romania

Rugby union career
- Position: Prop
Senior career
Years	Team	Apps	(Points)
1983-1992	Steaua Bucuresti		
1993-1994	Miélan-Mirande		
1994-	CS Vienne		
International career
Years	Team	Apps	(Points)
1984-1995	Romania	57	(19)

Gheorghe Leonte (born Fetești, 12 February 1963) is a former Romanian rugby union footballer. He played as a prop.

Leonte first played for Steaua Bucuresti, until he moved to France, where he represented Miélan-Mirande and CS Vienne, the last team of his player career.

He had 57 caps for Romania, scoring 4 tries, 19 points in aggregate, from 12 March 1984, in a 28-22 win over Scotland, in Bucharest, in a friendly match, to 3 June 1995, in a 42-3 defeat to Australia, in Stellenbosch, for the 1995 Rugby World Cup finals.

Leonte played in three Rugby World Cup finals, having 2 caps at the 1987 Rugby World Cup, 3 caps at the 1991 Rugby World Cup and 3 once again at the 1995 Rugby World Cup, never scoring.

== Honours ==
- Steaua Bucuresti

Divizia Nationala
1983/84, 1984/85, 1986/87, 1987/88, 1988/89, 1991/92
