= Bragadiru =

- Town
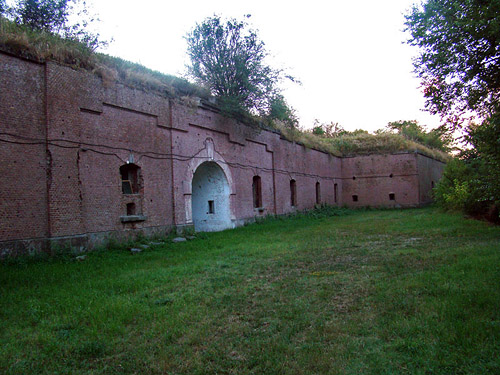
- Fort 16

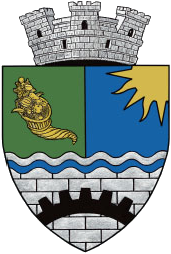
- Coat of arms

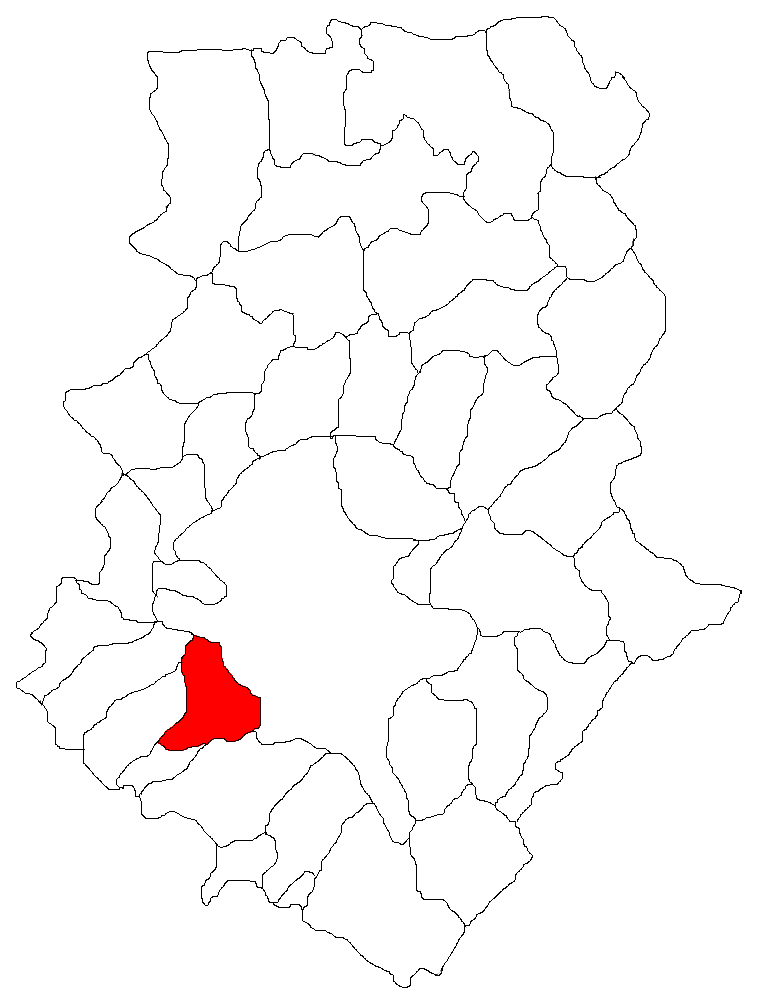
- Location in Ilfov County

- Location in Romania
- Coordinates: 44°22′15″N 25°58′30″E
- Country: Romania
- County: Ilfov

Government
  - Mayor (2024–2028): Gabriel Lupulescu (PNL)
- Area: 21.79 km^{2} (8.41 sq mi)
- Elevation: 90 m (300 ft)
- Population (2021-12-01): 40,080
  - Density: 1,839/km^{2} (4,764/sq mi)
- Time zone: UTC+02:00 (EET)
  - Summer (DST): UTC+03:00 (EEST)
- Postal code: 077025
- Area code: +(40) 021
- Vehicle reg.: IF
- Website: www.primariaorasbragadiru.ro

Bragadiru is a town in Ilfov County, Muntenia, Romania. The town is located in the southwestern vicinity of the city of Bucharest, at the exit towards Alexandria, being a part of the Bucharest metropolitan area. Bragadiru became a town on 29 December 2005.

== Geography ==
The town lies in the Wallachian Plain, on the banks of the river Sabar and of its tributary, the river Ciorogârla. Bragadiru is located around the intersection of the Bucharest Ring Motorway with the national road DN6 (part of European route E70).

== Demographics ==
Historical population
Year	Pop.	±% p.a.
2002	8,165	—
2011	14,410	+6.52%
2021	40,080	+10.77%
Source: Census data

According to the 2002 census, Bragadiru had a population of 8,165, of which 98.19% were Romanians, 1.45% were Roma, and 0.36% of other ethnic backgrounds. According to the 2011 census, the town had a population of 15,329 inhabitants, being the fifth urban center of Ilfov County from a demographic point of view, after Voluntari, Pantelimon, Buftea, and Popești-Leordeni. At the 2021 census, the population had increased to 40,080 inhabitants.
