= Cernavodă Bridge =

Bridge in Romania

Cernavodă Bridge Podul Cernavodă
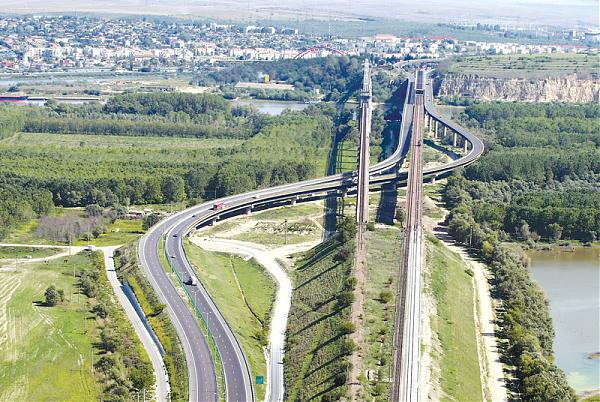
- Coordinates: 44°20′23″N 28°01′01″E
- Carries: Freeway, double-track electrified railroad line, two walkways
- Crosses: Danube; Borcea branch of the Danube
- Locale: Between Cernavodă and Fetești

Characteristics
- Design: Truss bridges
- Total length: 2,622 m (8,602 ft)
- Width: 32.5 m (107 ft)
- Longest span: 190 m (620 ft)
- First section length: 1,640 m (5,380 ft) (over main branch)
- Second section length: 982 m (3,222 ft) (over Borcea branch)

History
- Designer: CCCF Bucharest; IPTANA Bucharest (viaducts)
- Opened: 1986 (Borcea bridge); 1987 (Cernavodă bridge)

The Cernavodă Bridge (Romanian: Podul Cernavodă) is a complex of two freeway-railroad truss bridges in Romania, across the Danube River, connecting the cities of Cernavodă and Fetești, between the regions of Dobruja and Muntenia.

Inaugurated in 1987, the bridges have a total length of 2,622.85 m (8,605.2 ft), of which 1,640.35 m (5,381.7 ft) over the Danube at Cernavodă, and 982.5 m (3,223 ft) over the Borcea branch of the Danube, at Fetești.

The Cernavodă Bridge lies on the A2 Sun Motorway, in the vicinity of the old Anghel Saligny Bridge. Across the railway bridge runs the CFR Line 800, connecting Bucharest to the ports of Constanța and Mangalia on the Black Sea.

== See also ==
- A2 motorway (Romania)
- CFR Line 800 (Bucharest – Mangalia)
- Anghel Saligny Bridge
- List of bridges in Romania
