= Ciulnița =

- Commune
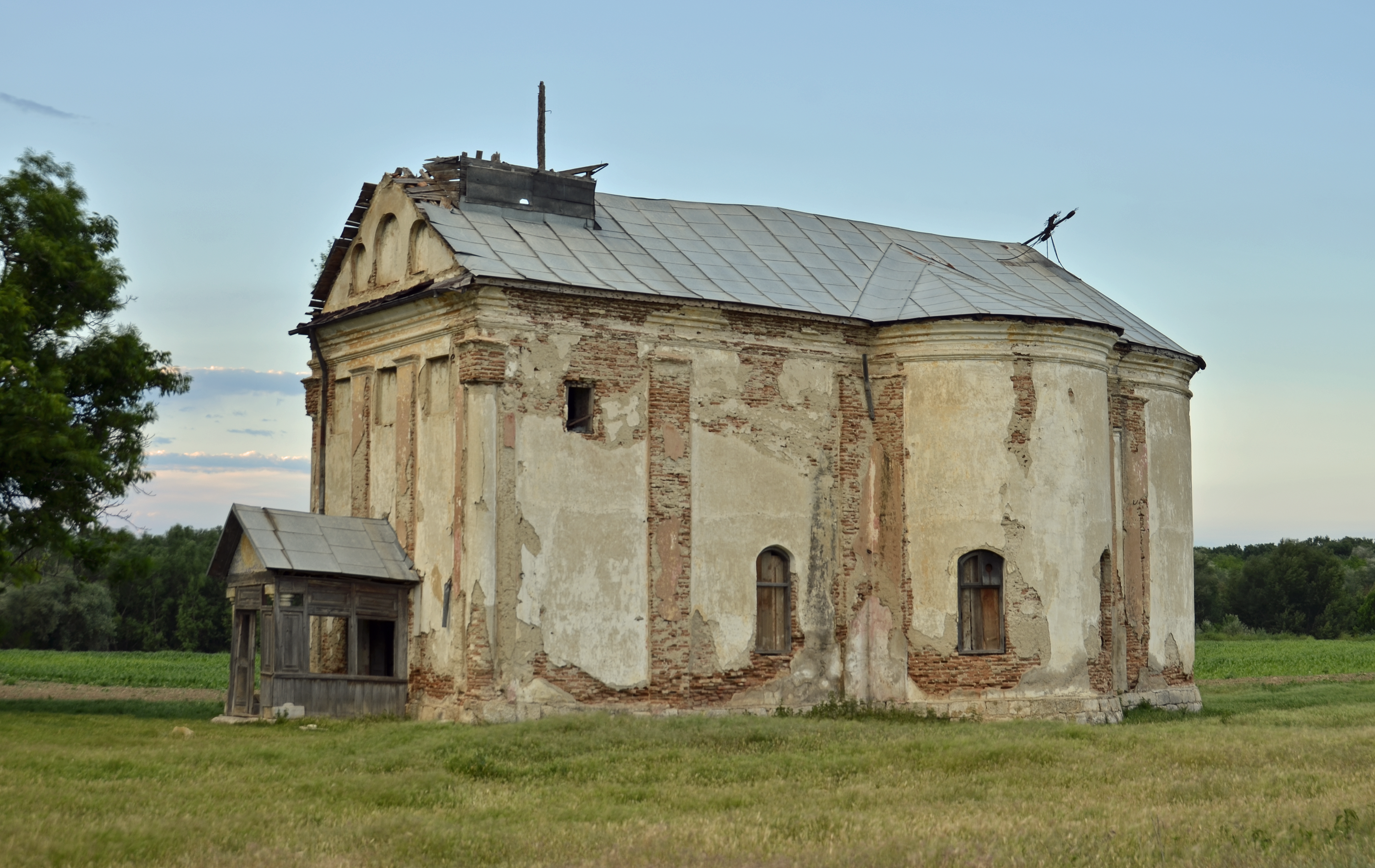
- Ruins of Saint Parascheva Church in Ivănești

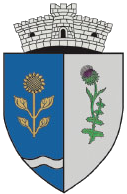
- Coat of arms

- Location in Ialomița County

- Location in Romania
- Coordinates: 44°32′N 27°21′E
- Country: Romania
- County: Ialomița

Government
  - Mayor (2020–2024): Stelică Gheorghe (ALDE)
- Area: 68.46 km^{2} (26.43 sq mi)
- Elevation: 54 m (177 ft)
- Population (2021-12-01): 2,338
  - Density: 34.15/km^{2} (88.45/sq mi)
- Time zone: UTC+02:00 (EET)
  - Summer (DST): UTC+03:00 (EEST)
- Postal code: 927080
- Area code: +(40) 243
- Vehicle reg.: IL
- Website: primariaciulnita.ro

Ciulnița is a commune located in Ialomița County, Muntenia, Romania. It is composed of four villages: Ciulnița, Ion Ghica, Ivănești, and Poiana.

The commune is situated in the Bărăgan Plain, at an altitude of 54 m (177 ft), on the right bank of the Ialomița River. It is located in the south-central part of the county, on the border with Călărași County, just south of the county seat, Slobozia, and 127 km (79 mi) east of Bucharest.

Ciulnița is crossed by county road DJ201, which ends in DN2. The Ciulnița train station (located in Dragalina, Călărași, 20 km (12 mi) to the south), serves the CFR Main Line 800, which connects Bucharest with the Black Sea coast.

Historical population
Year	Pop.	±%
2002	2,556	—
2011	2,400	−6.1%
2021	2,338	−2.6%
Source: Census data

At the 2021 census, the commune had a population of 2,338, of which 95.12% were Romanians.
