= DN5 =

Road in Romania

National Road 5
- Drumul Național 5

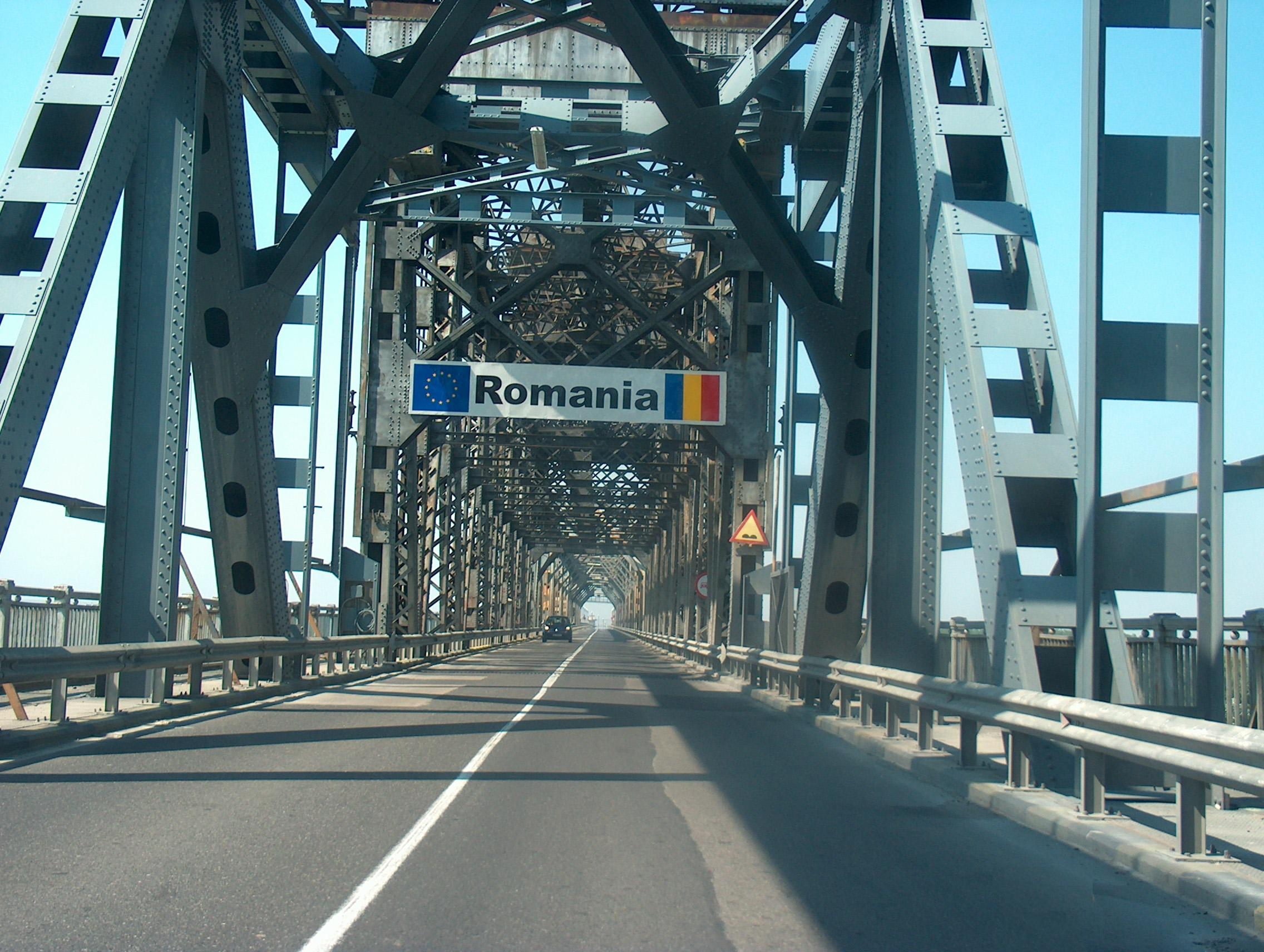

Route information
- Part of E70 / E85
- Maintained by Compania Națională de Autostrăzi și Drumuri Naționale din România
- Length: 67 km (42 mi)

Major junctions
- From: Bucharest
- To: Giurgiu (Bulgarian border)

Location
- Country: Romania
- Counties: Ilfov, Giurgiu
- Major cities: Bucharest, Giurgiu

Highway system
- Roads in Romania; Highways

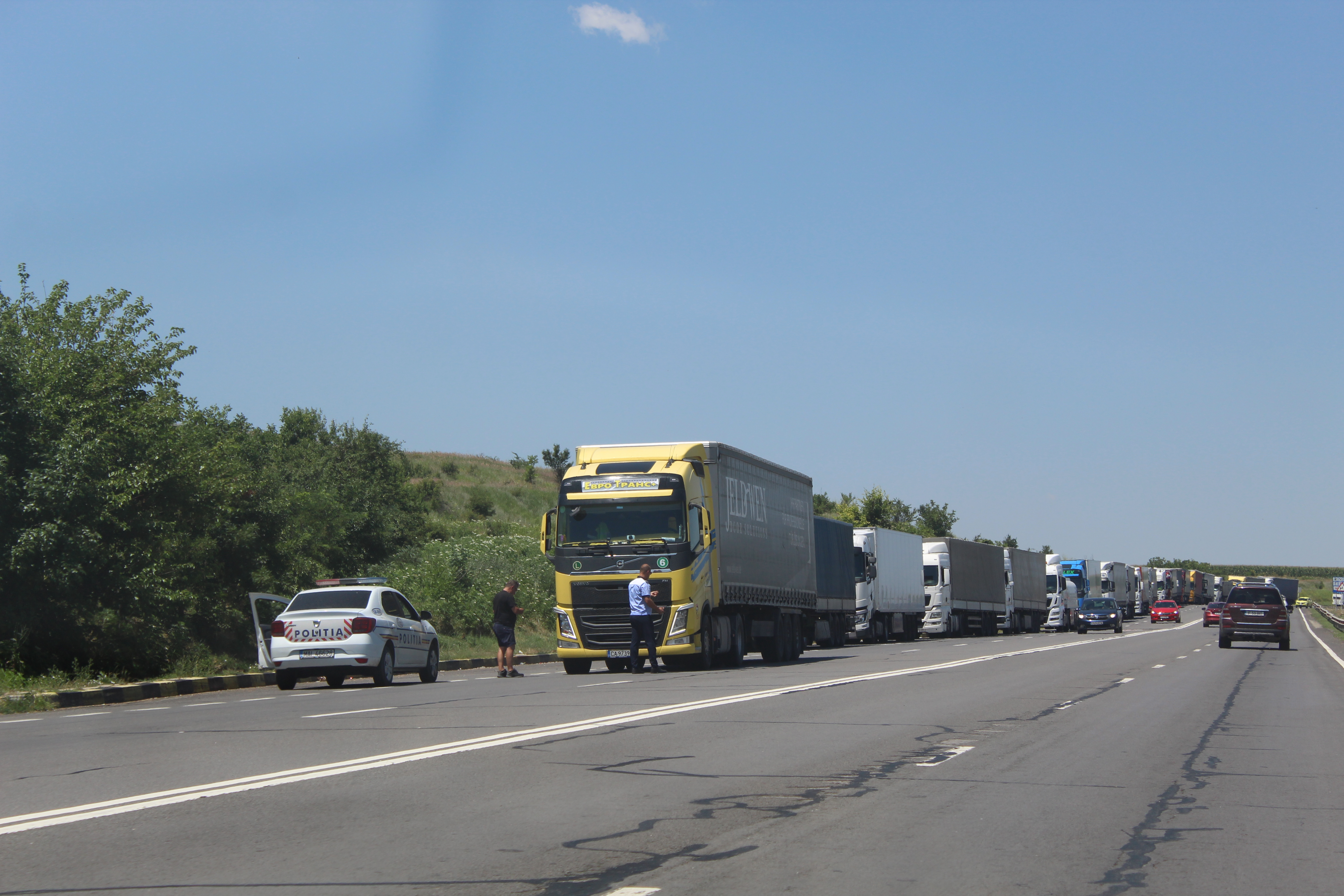
Police halting a convoy of lorries outside of Giurgiu

DN5 (Romanian: Drumul Național 5) is an important national road in Romania which links Bucharest with the southern country border with Bulgaria by the Giurgiu Russe Friendship Bridge.

DN5 has been designated as a priority express road, being upgraded between 2006 and 2009. Between Bucharest and Giurgiu, for the most part, it is a non-grade separated dual carriageway with no emergency lane, with entrances and exits from adjacent roads using roundabouts. Some segments (such as the Adunații-Copăceni bypass) are constructed to full motorway standard (dual carriageway, full grade-separation, wide median separation).

It is one of the most transited roads in southern Romania, serving as the main connection between Romania's capital, Bulgaria and the rest of Southeast Europe.

== Eastern Giurgiu bypass ==
Construction works on the DN5D (Romanian: Drumul Național 5D), the Eastern Giurgiu bypass, began in 2020. It was built to expressway-like standards and opened to traffic on 20 December 2021.

In the technical view, the contract for the 5,72 km of new road was signed with the Austrian company Porr for 106 million lei (excluding VAT) in 2019, the duration of the contract being 108 months.

Being sometimes also nicknamed the Autostrada nemțească (German motorway) due to it being made of concrete, with equipment brought from Germany, DN5D takes off transit and freight traffic to and from Bulgaria from the city of Giurgiu. In the meantime, the Bulgarian side came with a rendering of a new unified road & rail Danube bridge in the area of the existing Friendship Bridge, in which the road is a motorway with 2x2 lanes (likely to be the Veliko Tarnovo–Ruse motorway). The national road will be doubled in the Romanian side by the A5 motorway; however this is only a long-term plan.
