= Anghel Saligny Bridge =

Heritage site in Constanța County, Romania

Anghel Saligny Bridge Podul Anghel Saligny
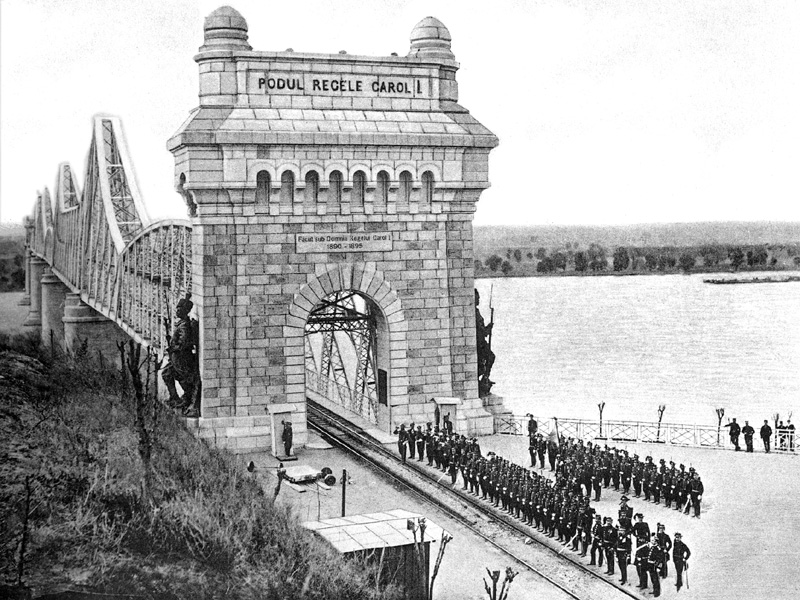
- Coordinates: 44°20′25.56″N 28°1′1.26″E
- Carries: single-track electrified railway line
- Crosses: Danube; Borcea branch of the Danube
- Locale: Between Cernavodă and Fetești
- Other name: King Carol I Bridge (Podul Regele Carol I)

Characteristics
- Design: Truss bridges
- Total length: 4,088 m (13,412 ft)
- Longest span: 190 m (620 ft)
- First section length: 1,662 m (5,453 ft) (over main branch)
- Second section length: 970 m (3,180 ft) (over Borcea branch)

History
- Designer: Anghel Saligny
- Opened: 26 September 1895

Location
- Interactive map of Anghel Saligny Bridge

The Anghel Saligny Bridge (Romanian: Podul Anghel Saligny), formerly King Carol I Bridge, is a complex of two railroad truss bridges in Romania, across the Danube River and the Borcea branch of the Danube, connecting the regions of Muntenia and Dobruja. The bridge is listed in the National Register of Historic Monuments.

== History ==
The bridge complex was built between 1890 and 1895 over the Danube, the Borcea branch of the Danube, and Balta Ialomiței island. When it was completed with a total length (including viaducts) of 4,087.95 m (13,411.9 ft) it became the longest bridge in Europe and the second longest in the world. The bridge was designed by the Romanian engineer Anghel Saligny. The two cities on the riverbanks where it was built are Fetești on the left bank of the Borcea branch, and Cernavodă on the right bank of the main branch.

The crossing at Cernavodă has a central span of 190 m (620 ft) and four other spans of 140 m (460 ft), connected to a viaduct with 15 spans of 60 m (200 ft) each. Another bridge, with three spans of 140 m (460 ft) and 11 spans of 50 m (160 ft), was designed and built over the Borcea branch. The two bridges have a total length of 2,632 m (8,635 ft), of which 1,662 m (5,453 ft) is over the Danube and 970 m (3,180 ft) is over the Borcea. The bridges are 30 m (98 ft) above the water, allowing tall ships to pass under them. Between the two bridges there was a 1,455 m (4,774 ft) viaduct over Balta Ialomiței island, with 34 spans of 42.8 m (140 ft) each.

The entire complex was inaugurated on 26 September 1895, and as a test on the opening, a convoy of 15 whistling locomotives sped across at 60 km/h, followed by a train reserved for 'guests' at 80 km/h.

In the 1960s, after large parts of Balta Ialomiței island were reclaimed for agriculture, the original viaduct over it was replaced with an embankment.

The bridge complex was used exclusively for almost a century, until 1987 when the adjacent Cernavodă Bridge complex was inaugurated.

== Gallery ==
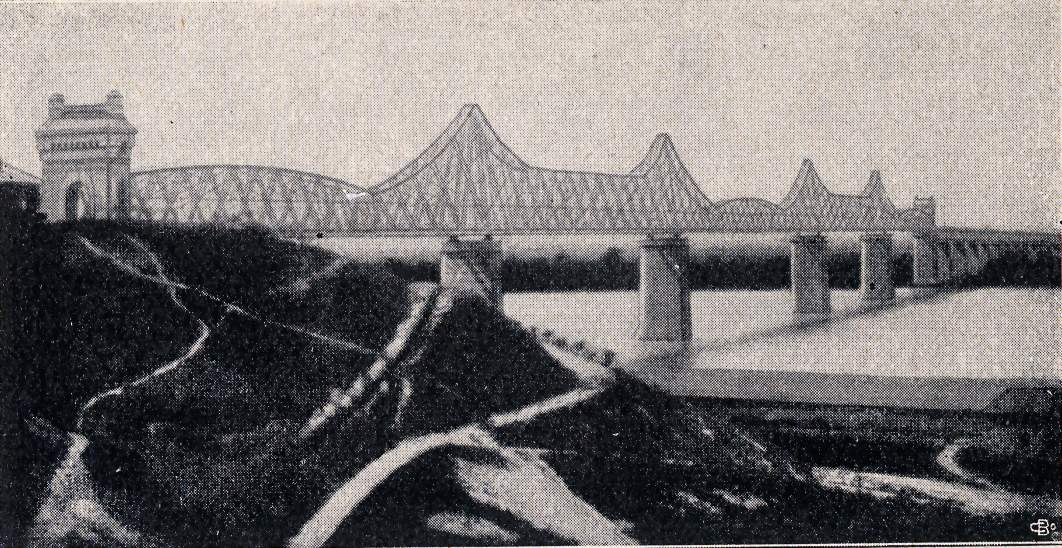
The bridge during the early 20th century

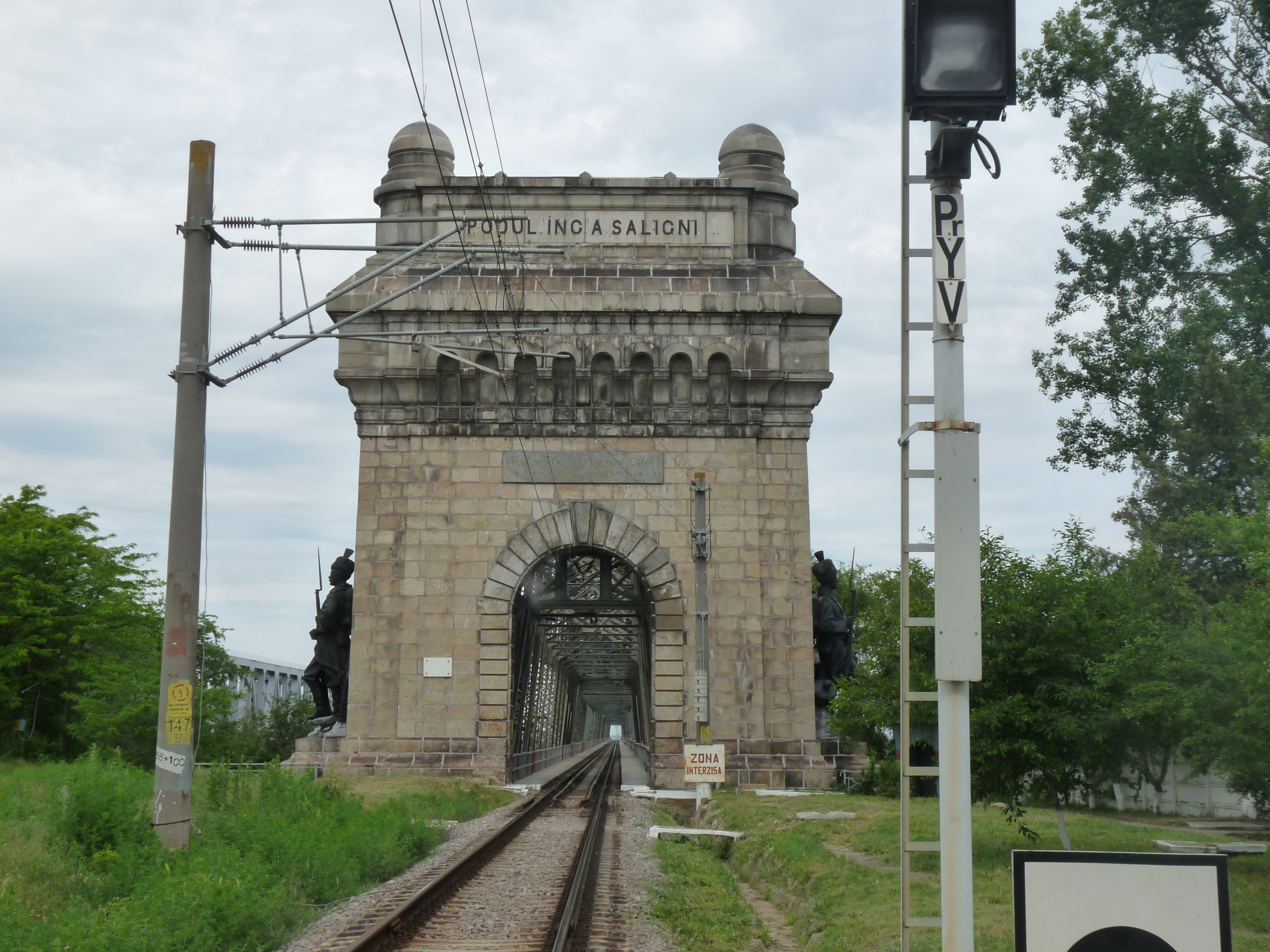
Bridge archway

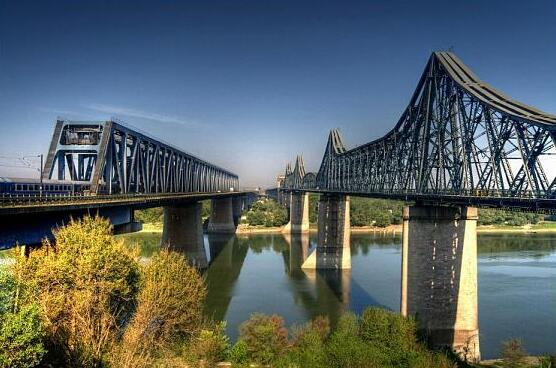
Anghel Saligny Bridge (right) and Cernavodă Bridge (left)

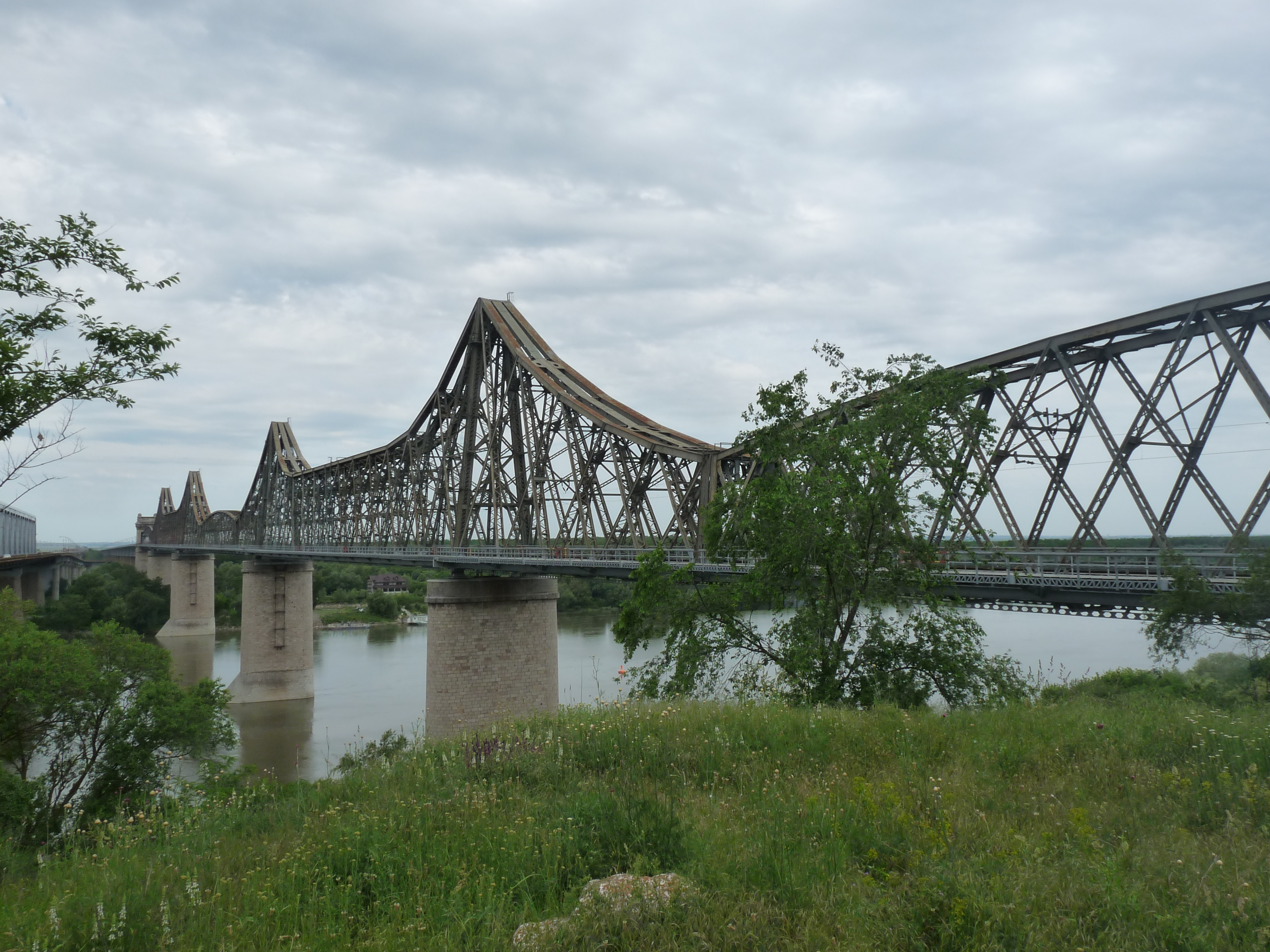
Anghel Saligny Bridge over the main branch of the Danube

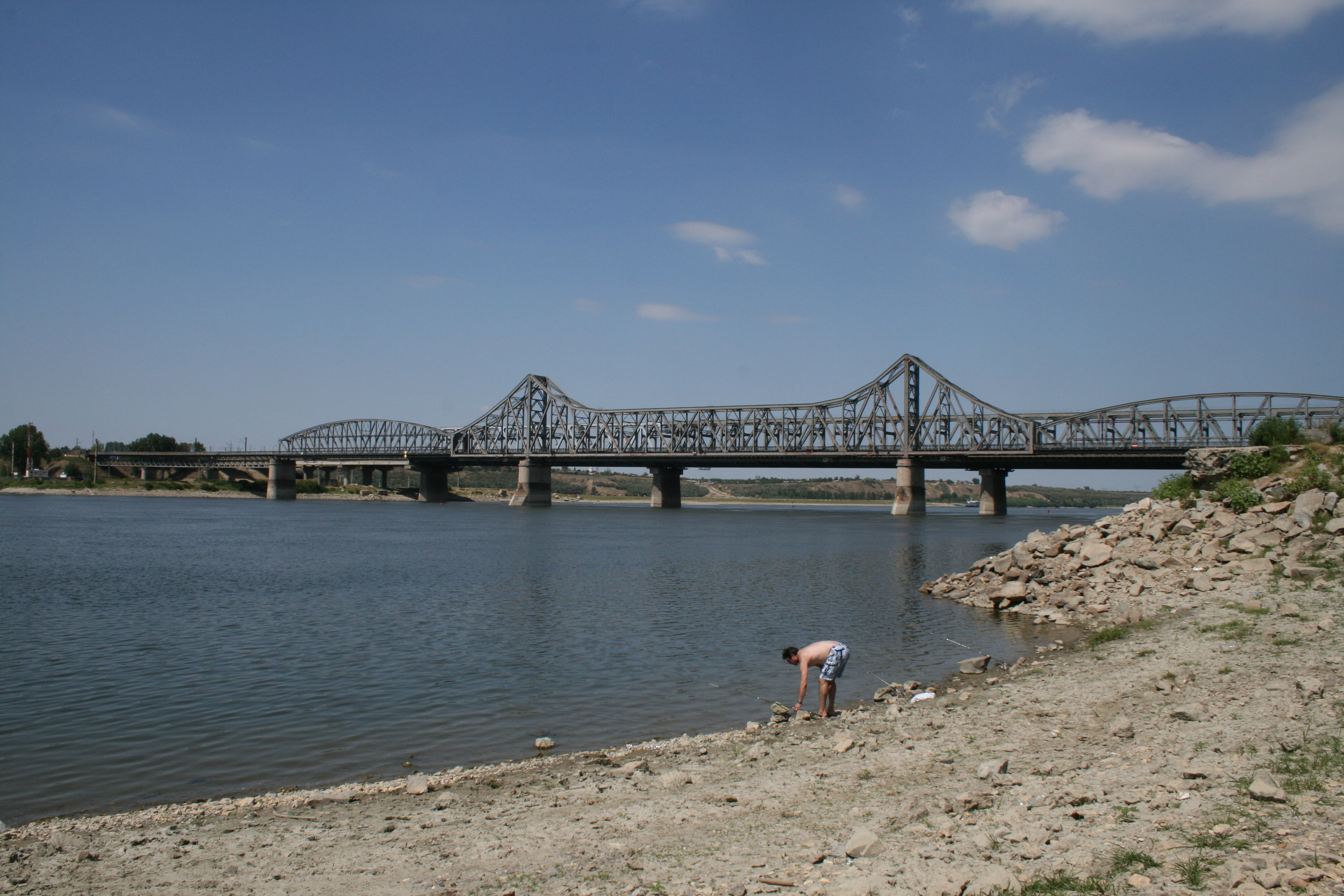
The bridge over the Borcea branch of the Danube

== See also ==
- CFR Line 800 (Bucharest – Mangalia)
- Cernavodă Bridge
- List of bridges in Romania
