= Port of Oltenița =

- Click on the map for a fullscreen view

Location
- Country: Romania
- Location: Călărași County
- Coordinates: 44.0634°N 26.6413°E

Details
- Owned by: Administratia Porturilor Dunarii Fluviale
- Type of harbour: Natural/Artificial
- Size: 88.7 hectares (887,000 m^{2})
- No. of berths: 2
- General manager: Ofiteru Danut

Statistics
- Annual cargo tonnage: 525,000 tonnes (2008)
- Website; Official site

The Port of Oltenița is one of the largest Romanian river ports, located in the city of Oltenița on the Danube River.
