= Pantelimon =

Pantelimon is derived from the name of Saint Pantaleon and may refer to several places in Romania:

- Pantelimon, Bucharest
  - Pantelimon metro station
- Pantelimon, Constanța
- Pantelimon, Ilfov
