= Research Institute for Cereals and Industrial Crops =

Research institute in Fundulea, Romania

The Research Institute for Cereals and Industrial Crops (INCDA, Institutul de Cercetări pentru Cereale și Plante Tehnice Fundulea) is a government research institute in Fundulea, Romania. It was founded in 1962 as a branch of the Agronomical Research Institute (ICAR, 1927) in Bucharest.
