= Veliko Tarnovo–Ruse motorway =

Planned motorway in Bulgaria

- Veliko Tarnovo–Ruse motorway highlighted in red

Route information
- Length: 118 km (73 mi) (planned length)

Major junctions
- From: Veliko Tarnovo
- To: Ruse; (Romania)

Location
- Country: Bulgaria

Highway system
- Highways in Bulgaria

The Veliko Tarnovo–Ruse motorway (Bulgarian: Автомагистрала ”Велико Търново–Русе”, Avtomagistrala "Veliko Tarnovo–Ruse") is a planned motorway in Northern Bulgaria, that will link Veliko Tarnovo and Ruse, at the Danube border crossing to Romania. Planned to be designated A8, it will span for approximately 118 kilometres (73 mi), superseding the existing major road 5. Along with the Hemus motorway (A2), the Veliko Tarnovo–Ruse motorway aims to provide motorway connection between Sofia and Bucharest, the capitals of Bulgaria and Romania. In March 2015, a tender for conceptual design was announced.

On 7 December 2020, Bulgaria's Road Infrastructure Agency announced the tender for the first 75,6 km of the motorway, being divided into two lots: Ruse - Byala and the Byala bypass.
