= Fetești =

- Municipality
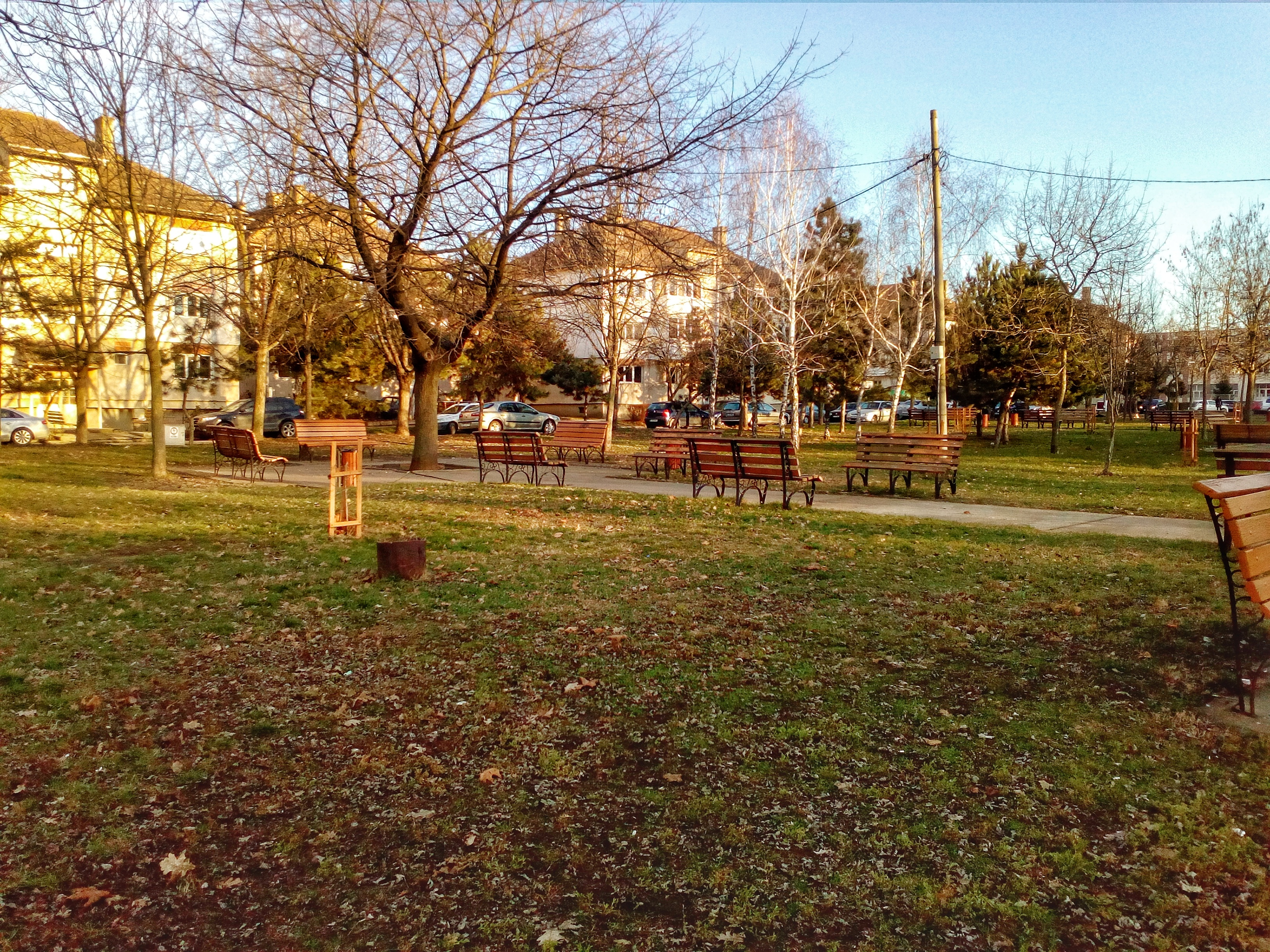
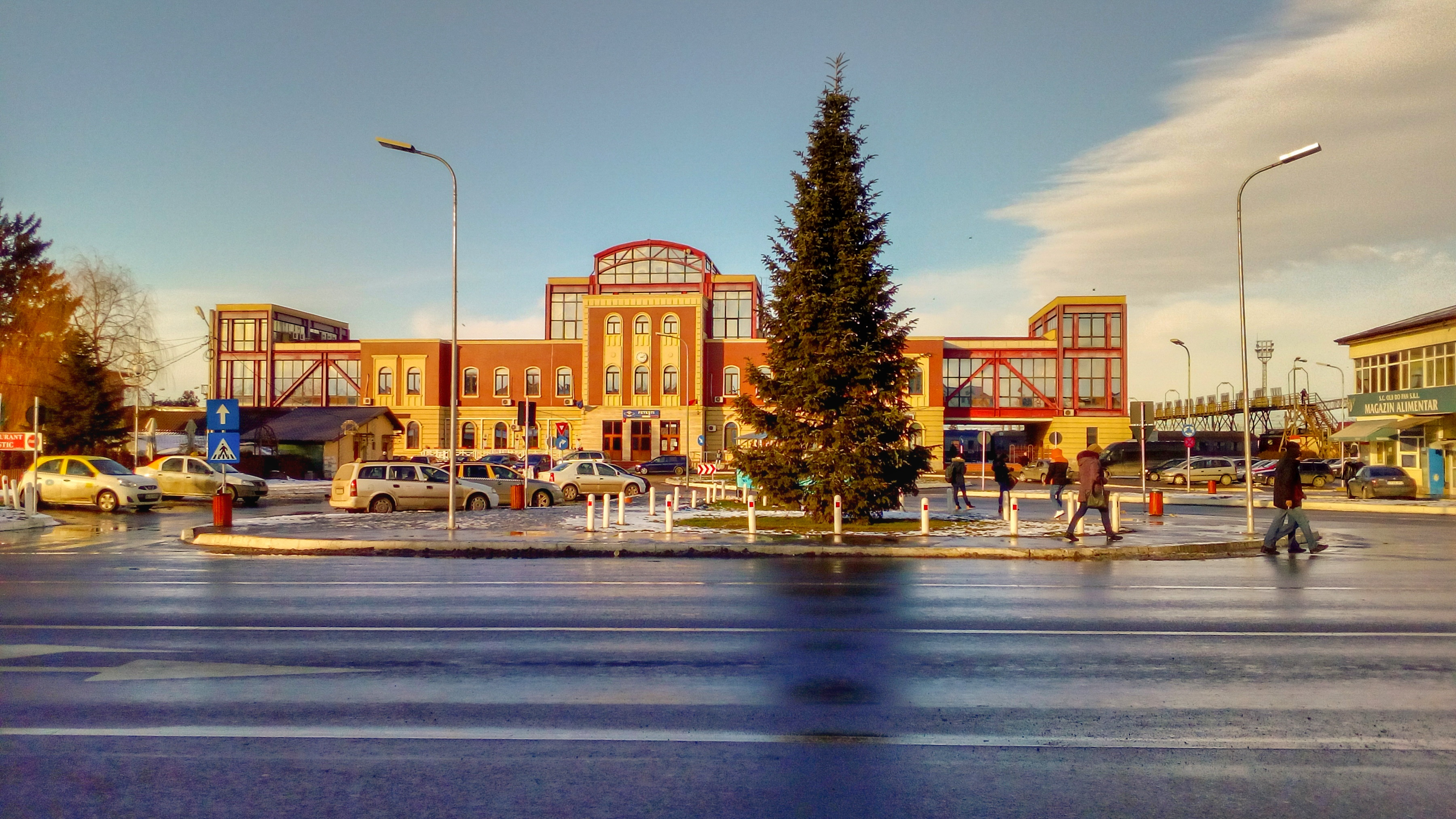
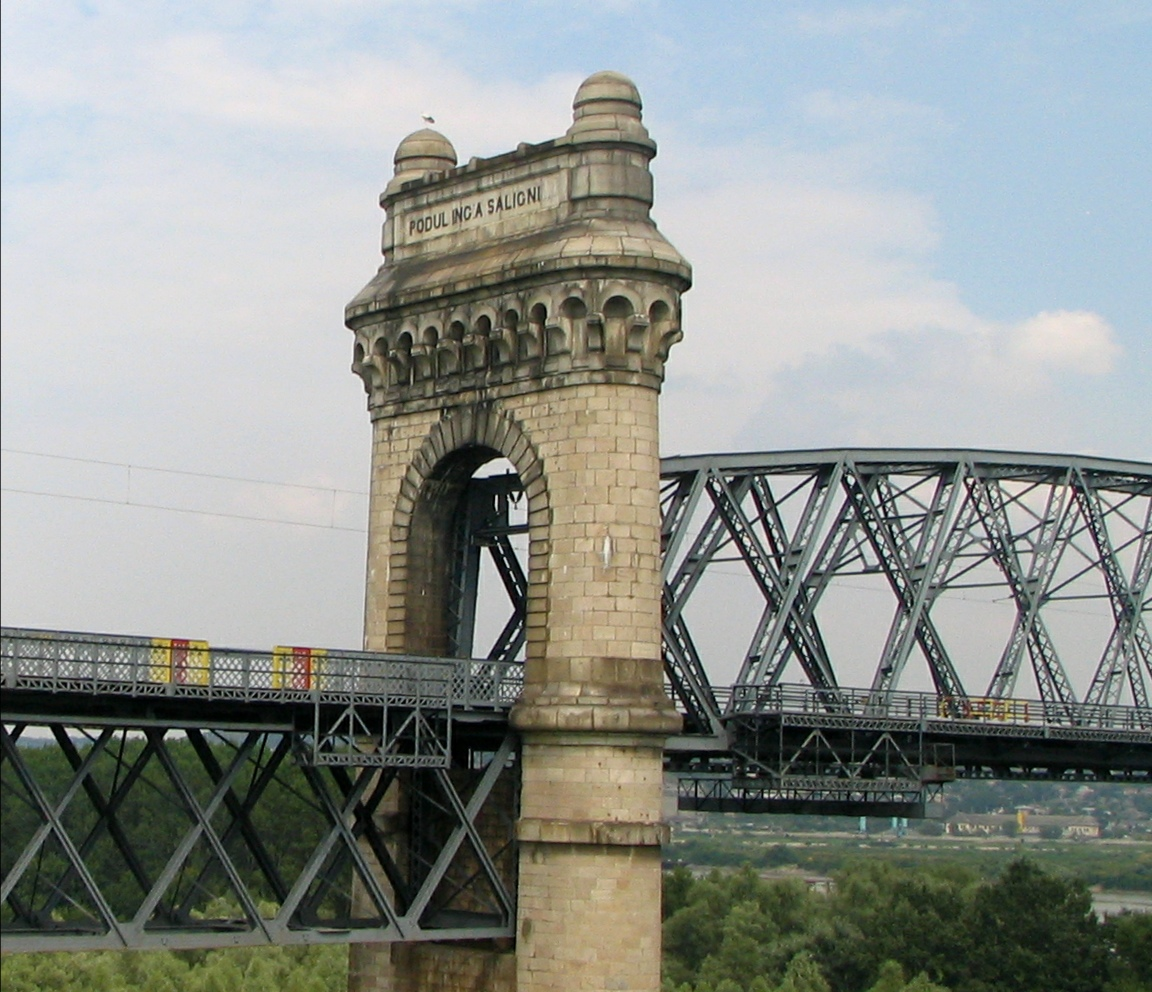
- Central Park in Fetești Fetești railway station King Carol I Bridge

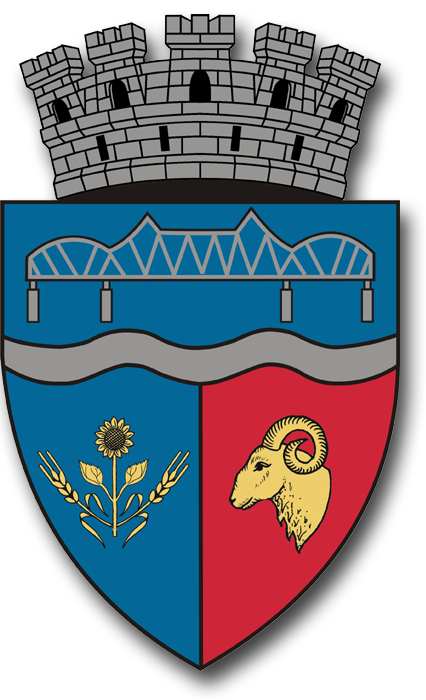
- Coat of arms

- Location in Ialomița County

- Location in Romania
- Coordinates: 44°24′54″N 27°49′25″E
- Country: Romania
- County: Ialomița

Government
  - Mayor (2024–2028): Laurențiu-Georgică Șonchereche (PSD)
- Area: 101.19 km^{2} (39.07 sq mi)
- Elevation: 20 m (66 ft)
- Population (2021-12-01): 27,465
  - Density: 271.42/km^{2} (702.97/sq mi)
- Time zone: UTC+02:00 (EET)
  - Summer (DST): UTC+03:00 (EEST)
- Postal code: 925100
- Area code: (+40) 02 43
- Vehicle reg.: IL
- Website: primariafetesti.ro

Fetești (Romanian pronunciation: [feˈteʃtʲ]) is a city in Ialomița County, Muntenia, Romania. It is located in the Bărăgan Plain, on the Borcea branch of the Danube. Fetești has the second largest population in Ialomița County, after Slobozia.

In 1895, the King Carol I railway bridge was built across the Danube to Cernavodă. A newer one was built in the 1980s as part of the Bucharest–Constanța A2 highway.

== History ==
The settlement of Fetești was first mentioned in the year 1528, in a document released by the ruler of Wallachia, Radu of Afumați. In 1868 Fetești became a commune, in 1934 a city, and 61 years later, in 1995, it achieved the status of municipality. In the course of time, Fetești has evolved to an important crossroads and industrial center.

Historical population
Year	Pop.	±%
1948	11,946	—
1956	15,383	+28.8%
1966	21,412	+39.2%
1977	27,491	+28.4%
1992	35,374	+28.7%
2002	33,197	−6.2%
2011	30,217	−9.0%
2021	27,465	−9.1%
Source: Census data

== Structure ==
The city is composed of four neighbourhoods: Fetești-Oraș, Fetești-Gară, Buliga, and Vlașca; formally, the last three are separate villages. Fetești-Gară has a population of over 20,000 inhabitants, and it is considered to be the center of Fetești.

== Natives ==
- Dănuț Dobre (born 1967), rower
- Petruș Gavrilă (born 1988), canoeist
- Costel Grasu (born 1967), discus thrower
- Gheorghe Leonte (born 1963), rugby union player
- Ion Mihăilescu (1916 – ?), footballer and manager
- Georgeta Pitică (1930 – 2018), international table tennis player
- Ion Vlad (1920 – 1992), sculptor

== Education ==
There are 7 schools and 3 high-schools in the city.

== See also ==
- RoAF 86th Air Base
