= Fundulea =

- Town
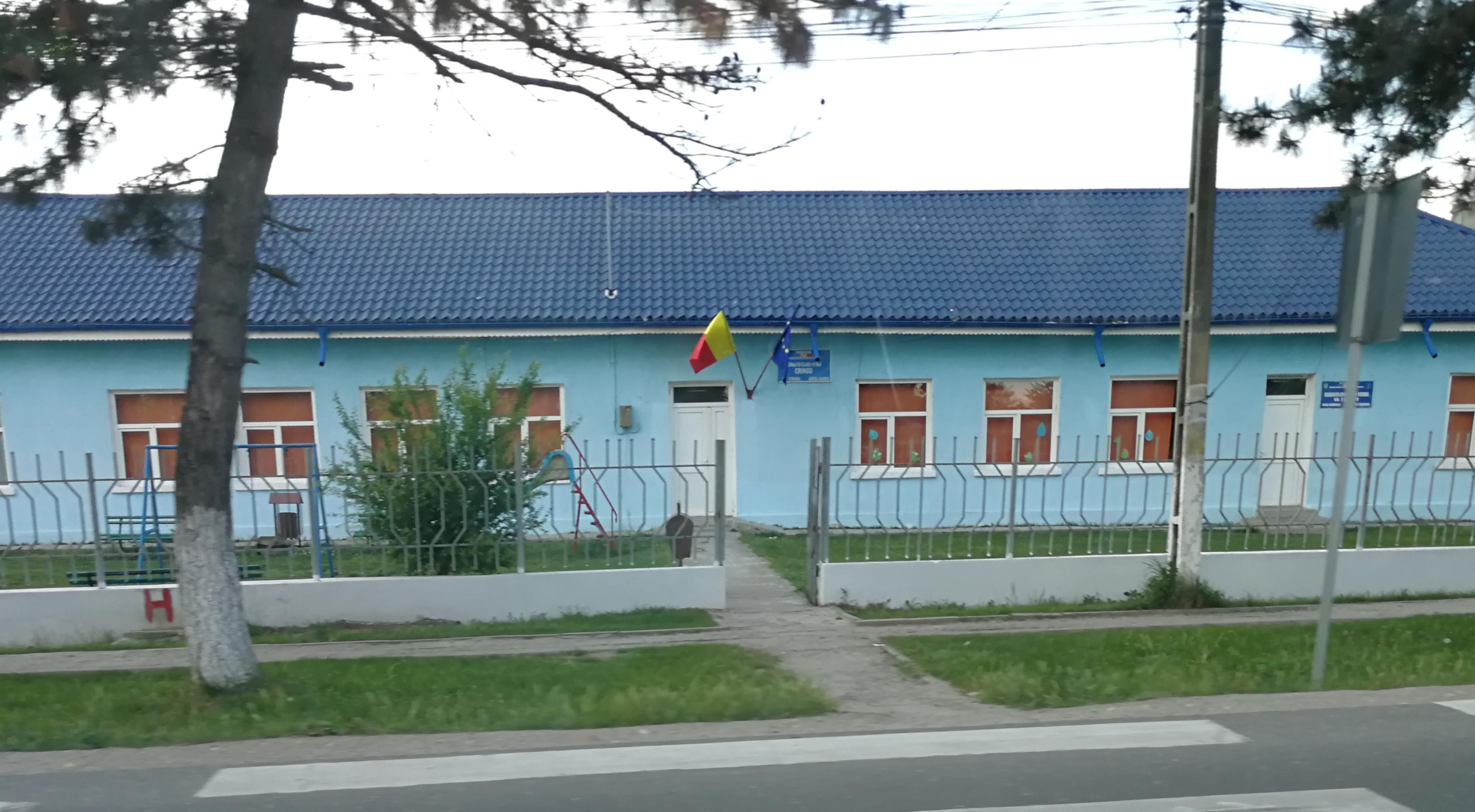
- Fundulea schoolhouse

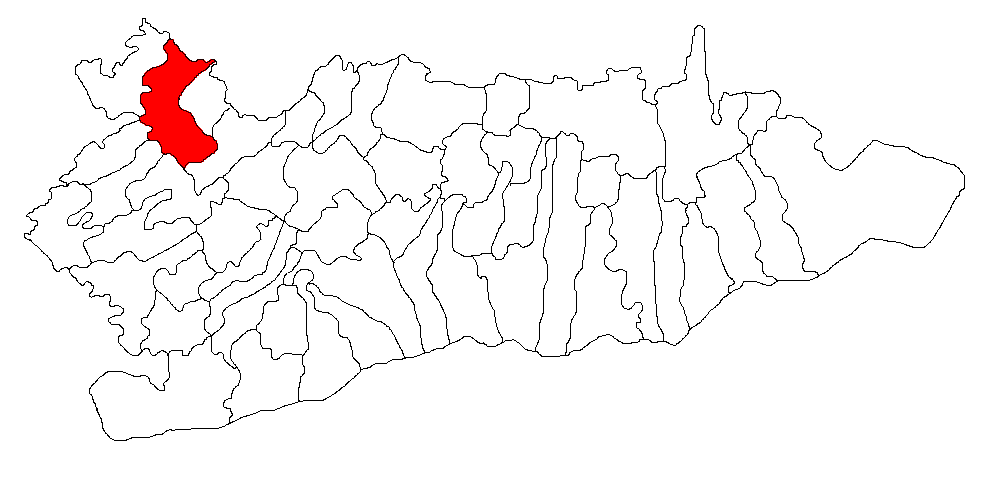
- Location in Călărași County

- Location in Romania
- Coordinates: 44°27′10″N 26°30′55″E
- Country: Romania
- County: Călărași

Government
  - Mayor (2024–2028): Dorel Dorobanțu (PSD)
- Area: 86.11 km^{2} (33.25 sq mi)
- Elevation: 70 m (230 ft)
- Population (2021-12-01): 6,714
  - Density: 77.97/km^{2} (201.9/sq mi)
- Time zone: UTC+02:00 (EET)
  - Summer (DST): UTC+03:00 (EEST)
- Postal code: 915200
- Area code: (+40) 02 42
- Vehicle reg.: CL
- Website: www.primaria-fundulea.ro

Fundulea is an agricultural town in Călărași County, Muntenia, Romania. It is on the Bărăgan Plain, approximately 30 km (19 mi) east of the capital Bucharest, in the historical region of Wallachia. It has a population of 6,714 (as of 2021). The A2 freeway and Mostiștea River pass through its vicinity. Two villages are administered by the town: Alexandru Ioan Cuza and Gostilele. It officially became a town in 1989, as a result of the Romanian rural systematization program.

Historically, Fundulea's outskirts housed a military base maintained by the Romanian Army. The town is home to an agricultural institute, the National Agricultural Research and Development Institute (Romanian: Institutul Național de Cercetare-Dezvoltare Agricolă, INCDA). A reservoir known as Lake Fundulea, fed by water from the Mostiștea, is a popular spot for sport fishing.

== History ==
Historical population
Year	Pop.	±%
1992	6,728	—
2002	6,217	−7.6%
2011	6,851	+10.2%
2021	6,714	−2.0%
Source: Census data

It first appears as Fondele in the Map of the Principalities of Moldavia and Wallachia from 1774, by Jacob Friedrich Schmidt. The first documentary mention is in 1778 in Historical and Geographical Memoirs on Wallachia published in Leipzig by General Bauer: Fundule petit village sur le ruisseau de Katora, page 145. During the 19th century, the village of Fundulea housed the Sionu estate of writer Gheorghe Sion, which, through the 1923 marriage of his daughter Marica, became the property of eccentric novelist, poet, and heraldist Mateiu Caragiale. Caragiale intended to turn it into a private domain, and reportedly flew an ensign he had created for himself.

The INCDA was created in 1962, during the Communist period, through the merger between the Research Institute for Maize Cultivation (Institutul de Cercetări pentru Cultura Porumbului) and the Field Cultivation Department (Departamentul Culturilor de Câmp) of the Romanian Agronomic Institute.

== Natives ==
Fundulea is the birthplace of the following notable people:

- Augustin Călin (b. 1980), football manager
- Mircea Nedelciu (1950–1999), a novelist in whose honor a local primary school was named in 2002
- Gabriel Oprea (b. 1961), general and politician, who was acting Prime Minister in 2015
