= Căile Ferate Române Line 800 =

Romanian railway line

Căile Ferate Române Line 300
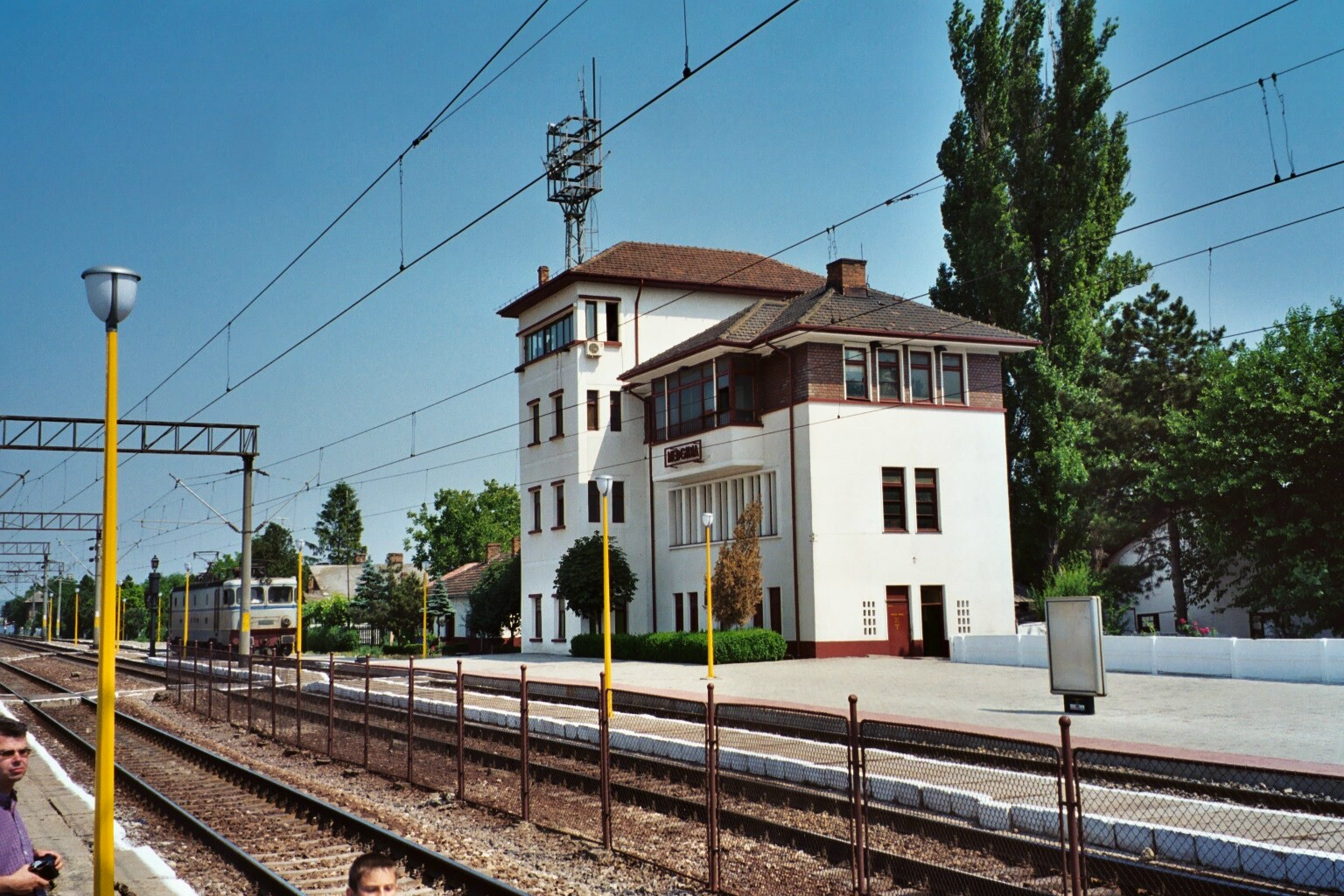
- Medgidia railway station

Overview
- Locale: Ialomița, Constanța, Călărași
- Stations: 13

Service
- Operator(s): Căile Ferate Române

Technical
- Line length: 268 km (167 mi)
- Track gauge: 1,435 mm (4 ft 8 1/2 in) standard gauge
Route map

Line 800 is one of CFR's main lines in Romania, having a total length of 268 kilometres (167 miles). The main line, connecting Bucharest with the Black Sea coast at Mangalia, passes through Fetești, Medgidia, and Constanța.

This railway line was upgraded and since July 2014 trains can run on most distance with a speed of 160 km/h (99 mph) for passenger trains, and 120 km/h (75 mph) for freight trains. The fastest passenger trains can cover the distance of 225 km (140 mi) between Bucharest and Constanța in less than two hours.

== Secondary lines ==
Line	Terminal stations		Intermediate stops	Length (km)
800	Bucharest (North)	Mangalia	Ciulnița – Fetești – Medgidia – Constanța	225
801	Bucharest (Obor)	Oltenița	Titan Sud	79
802	Slobozia	Călărași (Sud)		44
803	Medgidia	Negru Vodă		58
804	Medgidia	Tulcea		144
805	Saligny Est	Cernavodă Port		5
806	Dorobanțu	Capu Midia/Constanța Mărfuri		

== Gallery ==
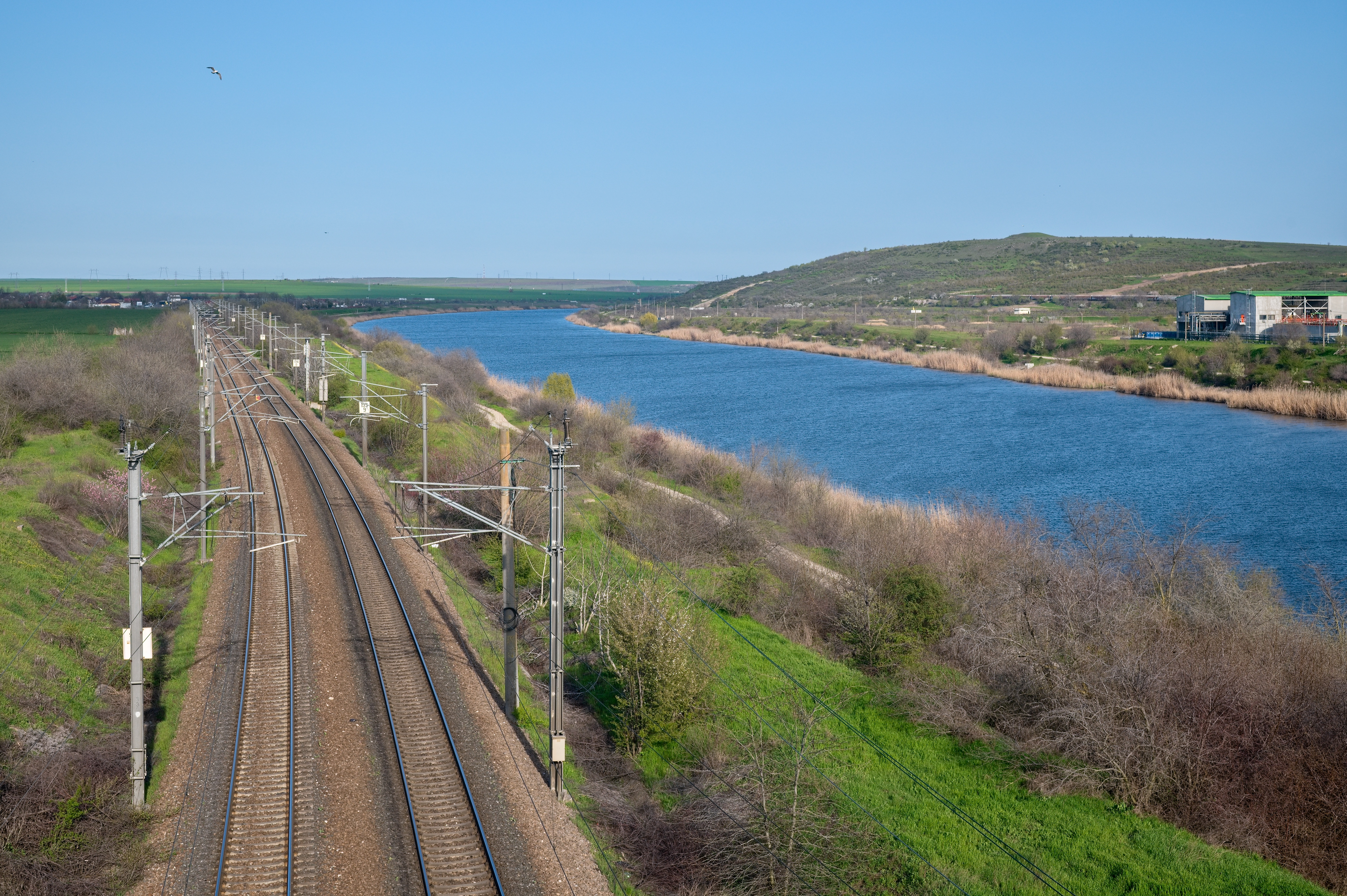
Bucharest–Constanța railway line after renovation
