= ZAM =

Zam or ZAM or similar may refer to:

== Places ==
- Zam, Burkina Faso, a town
  - Zam Department
- Zam Rural District of Iran
- Zam, Hunedoara, a commune in Romania
- Zam (river), Hunedoara County, Romania
- Zambia, IOC code ZAM

== People ==
- ZAM-1, Australian artist and designer
- Chef Zam (born 1970), Malaysian chef
- Okna Tsahan Zam (born 1958), Kalmyk folk singer
- Ruhollah Zam (1978–2020), Iranian activist
- Sherab Zam (1983), Bhutanese archer
- Zam Fredrick (born 1959), American basketball player
- Zam Wesell, a character in the film Star Wars Episode II

== Other uses ==
- Zam, a Zoroastrian concept
- Zam (irrigation), a system of irrigation used in Pakistan
- ZaM, a Serbian record label
- ZAM, the IATA code for the Zamboanga International Airport in the Philippines
- ZAM, the International Olympic Committee country code for Zambia
- zam, the ISO 639 code for the Miahuatlán Zapotec language of Mexico
- Zam Inc., an American comics publisher
- ZAM (album), studio album by American psychedelic rock band Frankie and the Witch Fingers

== See also ==
- Zamzam (disambiguation)
- Zamrock, a rock music genre
- Zams
- Zim and Zam
- Zor and Zam
