= Dumești =

Dumești may refer to several places in Romania:

- Dumești, a commune in Iași County
- Dumești, a commune in Vaslui County, and its village of Dumeștii Vechi
- Dumești, a village in Sălciua Commune, Alba County
- Dumești, a village in Vorța Commune, Hunedoara County
- Dumești (river), in Hunedoara County
