= Lăpugiu de Jos =

- Commune
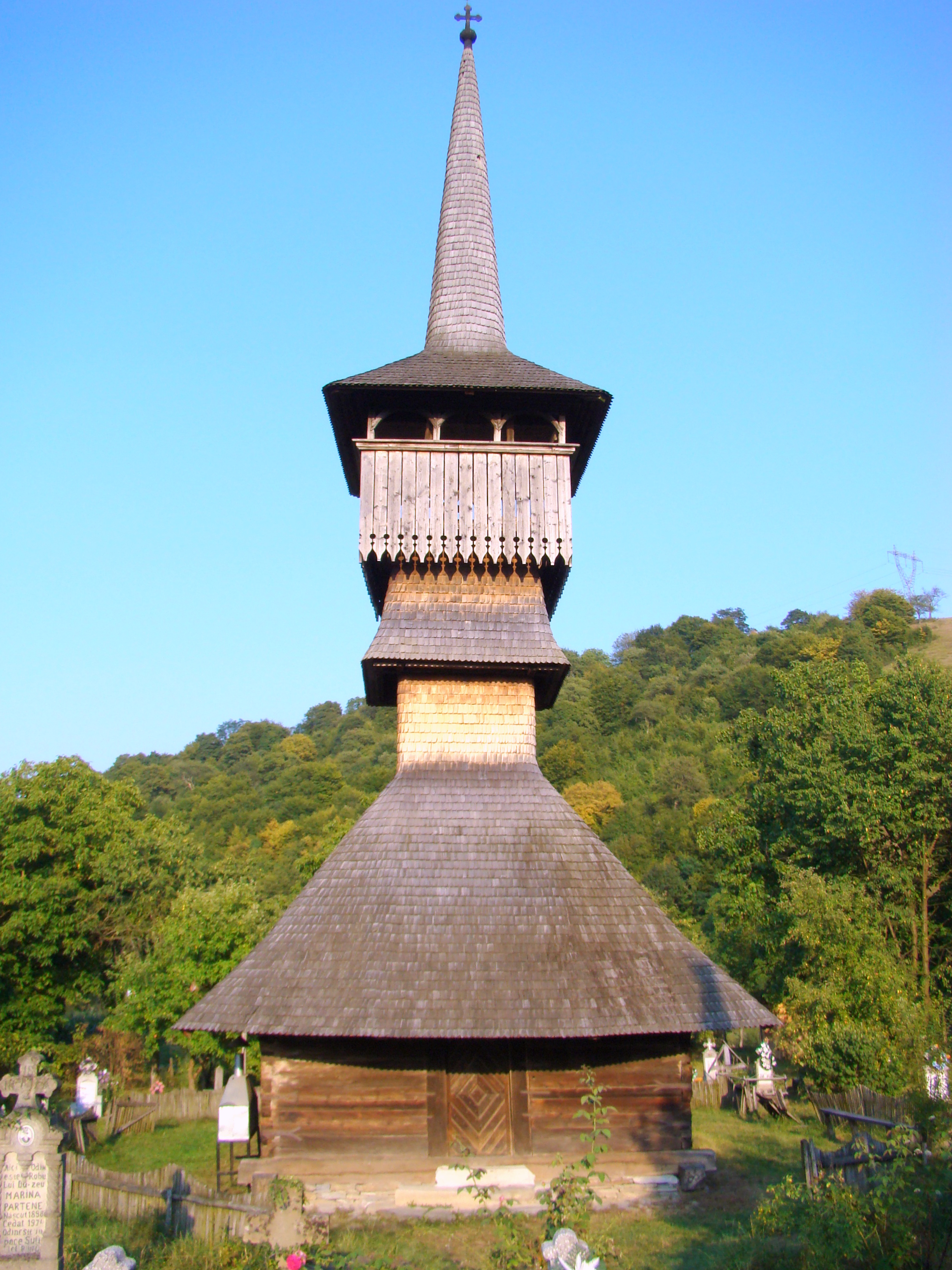
- Wooden church in Lăpugiu de Jos

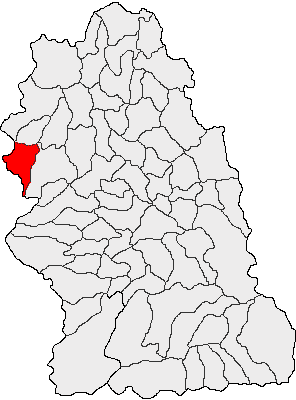
- Location in Hunedoara County

- Location in Romania
- Coordinates: 45°53′N 22°29′E
- Country: Romania
- County: Hunedoara

Government
  - Mayor (2024–2028): Emanuel Alin Drăgănesc (PSD)
- Area: 104.40 km^{2} (40.31 sq mi)
- Elevation: 225 m (738 ft)
- Population (2021-12-01): 1,460
  - Density: 14.0/km^{2} (36.2/sq mi)
- Time zone: UTC+02:00 (EET)
  - Summer (DST): UTC+03:00 (EEST)
- Postal code: 337280
- Area code: (+40) 02 54
- Vehicle reg.: HD
- Website: www.primarialapugiudejos.ro

Lăpugiu de Jos (Hungarian: Alsólapugy, German: Unter-Lappendorf) is a commune in Hunedoara County, Transylvania, Romania. It is composed of ten villages: Baștea (Bástya), Cosești (Kosesd), Fintoag (Fintóág), Grind (Gerend), Holdea (Holgya), Lăpugiu de Jos, Lăpugiu de Sus (Felsőlapugy), Lăsău (Laszó), Ohaba (Ohába), and Teiu (Tyej).

The commune is located in the western part of Hunedoara County, 42 km (26 mi) from the county seat, Deva, on the border with Timiș County. It is nestled in the hills at the foot of the Poiana Ruscă Mountains, on the banks of the river Valea Mare and its tributary, the Lăpugiu, just south of the Mureș River.

Lăpugiu de Jos is crossed east to west by the partly completed A1 motorway, which runs from Bucharest to the Hungarian border. National road DN68A covers a 13 km (8.1 mi) gap in the highway between Holdea village and Margina commune in Timiș County. The Holdea train station serves the CFR Line 212 that connects Ilia to Lugoj.

Historical population
Year	Pop.	±%
1910	4,433	—
2002	1,750	−60.5%
2011	1,659	−5.2%
2021	1,460	−12.0%
Source: Census data
