= Sârbi (Mureș) =

Sârbi Szirbi-patak
- Location within Romania

Location
- Country: Romania
- Counties: Hunedoara County
- Villages: Visca, Vorța, Valea Lungă, Sârbi

Physical characteristics
- Mouth: Mureș
  - location: Upstream of Ilia
  - coordinates: 45.9314°N 22.6785°E
- Length: 24 km (15 mi)
- Basin size: 117 km^{2} (45 sq mi)

Basin features
- Progression: Mureș→ Tisza→ Danube→ Black Sea
- Tributaries
  - left: Pârâul lui Șarpe, Dumești
  - right: Valea Malului, Băgara, Homorod

The Sârbi (Hungarian: Szirbi-patak) is a right tributary of the river Mureș in Romania. It discharges into the Mureș near Ilia. Its length is 24 km (15 mi) and its basin size is 117 km^{2} (45 sq mi).
