= Tataresd =

Tataresd is the Hungarian name for two villages in Romania:

- Tătăreşti village, Burjuc Commune, Hunedoara County
- Tătăreştii de Criş village, Vața de Jos Commune, Hunedoara County
