= Valea Mare (Mureș) =

Valea Mare Ohába-patak
- Location within Romania

Location
- Country: Romania
- Counties: Hunedoara County
- Villages: Cosești, Ohaba, Lăpugiu de Jos, Grind, Lăsău

Physical characteristics
- Source: Poiana Ruscă Mountains
- Mouth: Mureș
  - location: Burjuc
  - coordinates: 45.9411°N 22.4941°E
- Length: 15 km (9.3 mi)
- Basin size: 95 km^{2} (37 sq mi)

Basin features
- Progression: Mureș→ Tisza→ Danube→ Black Sea
- Tributaries
  - right: Lăpugiu

The Valea Mare (Hungarian: Ohába-patak) is a left tributary of the river Mureș in Romania. It discharges into the Mureș near Burjuc. Its length is 15 km (9.3 mi) and its basin size is 95 km^{2} (37 sq mi).
