= Valea Poienii =

Valea Poienii may refer to several villages in Romania:

- Valea Poienii, a village in Bucium Commune, Alba County
- Valea Poienii, a village in Râmeț Commune, Alba County
- Valea Poienii, a village in Livezile Commune, Bistrița-Năsăud County
- Valea Poienii, a village in Samarinești Commune, Gorj County
- Valea Poienii, a village in Vorța Commune, Hunedoara County
- Valea Poienii, a village in Valea Călugărească Commune, Prahova County
