= Trash Classic =

Studio album by Frankie and the Witch Fingers
- Released: June 6, 2025
- Length: 44:39
- Label: Greenway
- Producer: Maryam Qudus; Josh Menashe; Dylan Sizemore

Frankie and the Witch Fingers chronology
Live at KEXP (2025)	Trash Classic (2025)

Singles from Trash Classic
- 1. "Economy" Released: March 11, 2025; 2. "Total Reset" Released: April 9, 2025; 3. "Dead Silence" Released: May 7, 2024; 4. "Gutter Priestess" Released: May 21, 2025

Trash Classic is the eighth studio album by American rock band Frankie and the Witch Fingers. It was released on June 6, 2025, on Greenway Records.

== Composition and recording ==
After Data Doom the band was a 4-piece. But Sizemore said "We were open to the idea of making a record that forced us to be a five piece", with the intention of adding a lot of synthesizers. They then added Jon Madaff back to the band this time on synthesizer instead of drums.

Commenting on the theme of trash in the album Sizemore also said "Healthcare is trash, there's garbage in our practice space, trash on the street—you just want to write about what you're seeing, and it's hard not to talk about it."

== Critical reception ==
Professional ratings
Aggregate scores
Source	Rating
Album of the Year	80/100
Review scores
Source	Rating
AllMusic	4/5 stars
The Fire Note	4/5 stars
Louder Than War	4.5/5 stars
New Noise	4/5 stars
Reverb Is for Lovers	7.5/10 stars
Classic Rock	7/10 stars

The response to Trash Classic has been positive from reviewers. Critics from Album of the Year have given it a composite score of 80/100.

New Noise in a 4/5-star review said the album's best quality is "its ability to parse through serious concerns regarding the future of society with insanely catchy grooves." In a 4.5/5 bomb review from Louder than War they were compared to Osees "The band have grounded their new album firmly in John Dwyer's weird fuzz-drenched world, and they are all the better for having done so." They were compared to Devo being "lost in a haunted arcade—Trash Classic is weird, wired, and built to blow minds live" in a 4/5 headphone review by The Fire Note.

AllMusic described the album as the band's "most purely pleasurable release to date."

They were again compared to OSEES in the Reverb Is for Lovers 7.5/10 review.

== Track listing ==
All tracks are written by Frankie and the Witch Fingers.

No.	Title	Length
1.	"Channel Rot"	1:15
2.	"T.V. Baby"	3:13
3.	"Dead Silence"	4:14
4.	"Fucksake"	3:25
5.	"Economy"	3:10
6.	"Eggs Laid Brain"	2:46
7.	"Out of the Flesh"	4:19
8.	"Total Reset"	4:38
9.	"Conducting Experiments"	5:10
10.	"Gutter Priestess"	4:48
11.	"Trash Classic"	7:46
Total length:		44:49

== Personnel ==
Frankie and the Witch Fingers

- Dylan Sizemore – lead vocals, rhythm guitar
- Josh Menashe – lead guitar, backing vocals, synthesizer
- Nicole "Nikki Pickle" Smith – bass
- Nick Aguilar – drums

Additional personnel

- Maryam Qudus – producer, engineering
- Josh Menashe – producer, additional engineering, mixing
- Dylan Sizemore – producer, additional engineering
- Nick Townsend – mastering

== Charts ==
Chart performance for Trash Classic
Chart (2025)	Peak position
Scottish Albums (OCC)	50
UK Albums Sales (OCC)	41
UK Independent Albums (OCC)	15
UK Progressive Albums (OCC)	3
UK Rock & Metal Albums (OCC)	7
