= DN68A =

Road in Romania

National Road 68A
- Drumul Național 68A

Route information
- Part of E673
- Maintained by Compania Națională de Autostrăzi și Drumuri Naționale din România
- Length: 78.5 km (48.8 mi)

Major junctions
- West end: Lugoj
- East end: Ilia

Location
- Country: Romania
- Counties: Timiș, Hunedoara

Highway system
- Roads in Romania; Highways

DN68A (Romanian: Drumul Național 68A) is a national road in Romania which links the Banat and Transylvania regions, between the municipality of Lugoj and the commune of Ilia, at 15 km (9.3 mi) from Deva, the seat of the Hunedoara County. It crosses the town of Făget and links two major national roads: DN6 and DN7.

The A1 motorway takes all transit and freight traffic from the road, with the exception of 13 km between Holdea and Margina where all traffic needs to transfer to the national road, since the motorway has a gap in that area. This gap will take a few years to be covered, considering there are tunnels that need to be built in the route. This part of the national road is notorious for its instability, and even through the Regional Direction of Roads and Bridges of Timișoara is actively repairing the road, the traffic that was supposed to be on the A1 causes instability issues to return in the national road segment after just a few days.

Upon completion of the motorway between Deva and Lugoj, most of the traffic of this national road would only come from inhabitants of the localities crossed by the road.
