= European route E673 =

Road in trans-European E-road network

E673

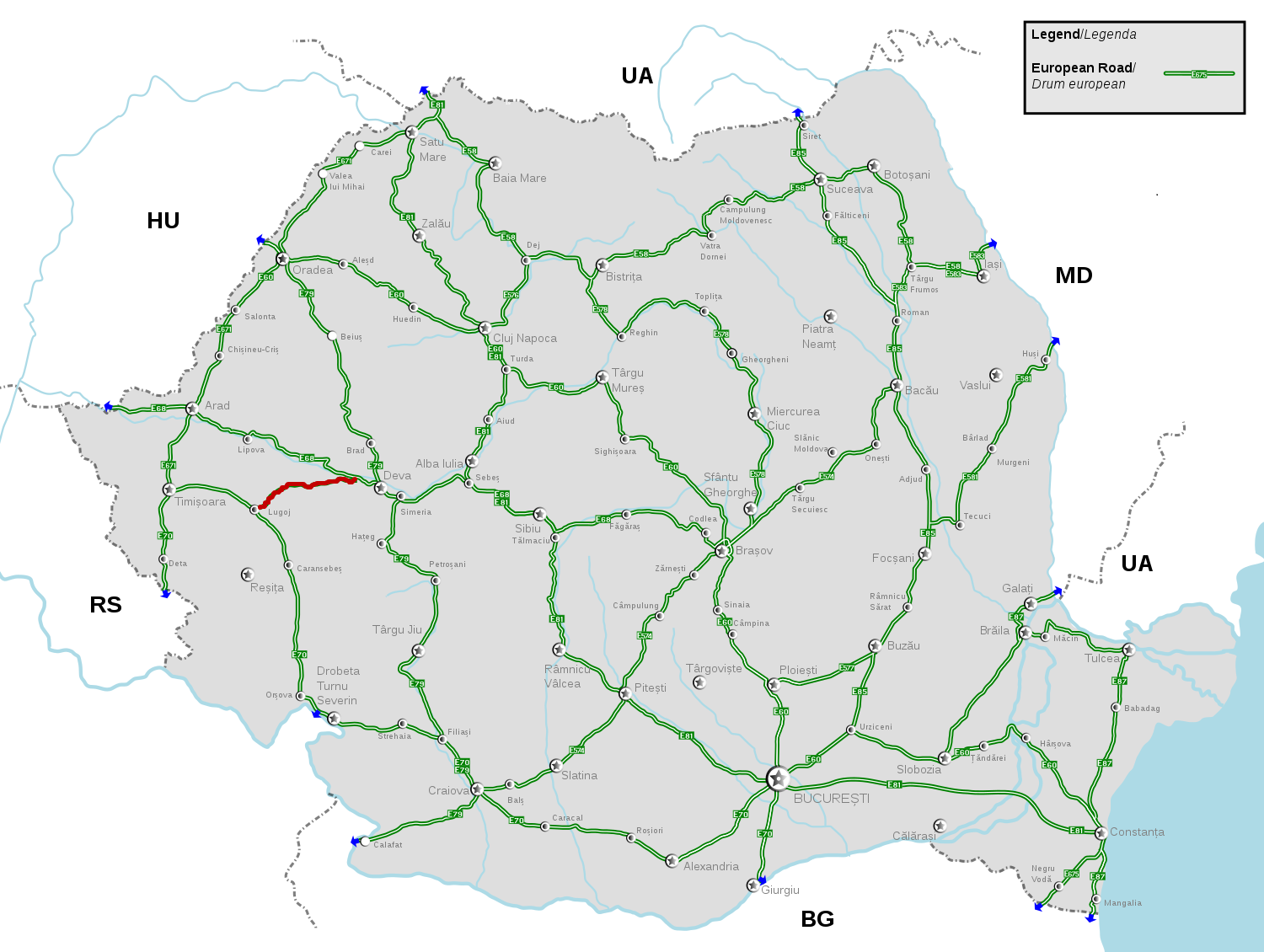

Route information
- Length: 103 km (64 mi)

Major junctions
- From: Lugoj
- To: Deva

Location
- Countries: Romania

Highway system
- International E-road network; A Class; B Class

European route E 673 is a road part of the International E-road network. It begins in Lugoj and ends in Deva. It is 103 km (64 mi) long.

== Route ==
- Romania
  - DN68A: Lugoj ( E70) - Ilia ( E68, Towards Deva E79)
