= Zam, Hunedoara =

Zam
- Commune
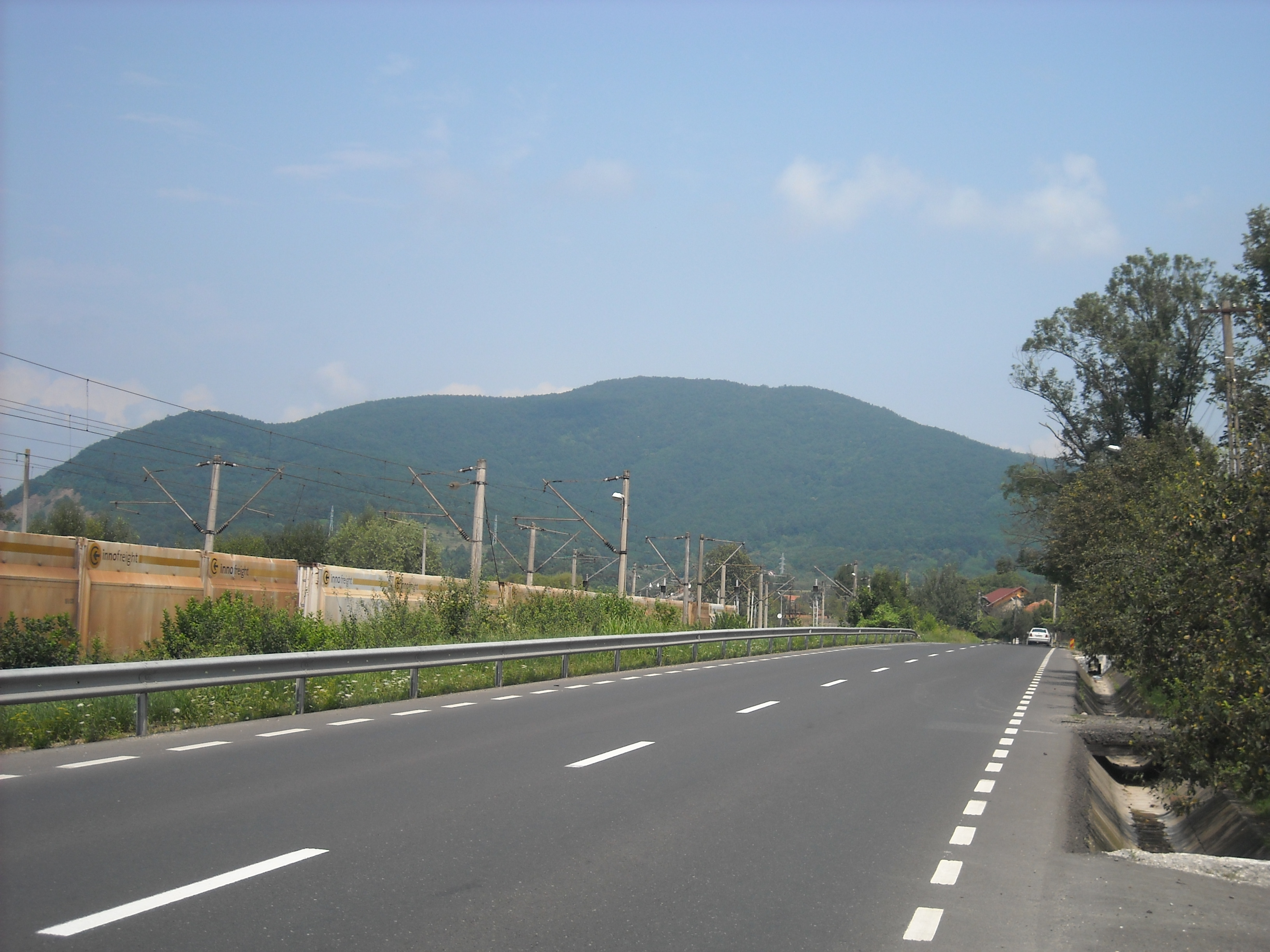
- A view of the village of Zam at the foot of the hill in the commune of the same name

- Location in Hunedoara County

- Location in Romania
- Coordinates: 46.006°N 22.444°E
- Country: Romania
- County: Hunedoara

Government
  - Mayor (2024–2028): Sorin Ionel Nistor (PNL)
- Area: 161.88 km^{2} (62.50 sq mi)
- Elevation: 160 m (520 ft)
- Population (2021-12-01): 1,585
  - Density: 9.791/km^{2} (25.36/sq mi)
- Time zone: UTC+02:00 (EET)
  - Summer (DST): UTC+03:00 (EEST)
- Postal code: 337550
- Area code: +40 x54
- Vehicle reg.: HD
- Website: www.comunazam.ro

Zam (Hungarian: Zám; German: Sameschdorf) is a commune in Hunedoara County, Transylvania, Romania. It is composed of thirteen villages: Almaș-Săliște (Almásszelistye), Almășel (Almasel), Brășeu (Brassó), Cerbia (Cserbia), Deleni, Godinești (Godinesd), Micănești (Mikanesd), Pogănești (Poganesd), Pojoga (Pozsga), Sălciva (Szolcsva), Tămășești (Tamasesd), Valea, and Zam.

The commune is located in the northwestern part of the county, on the border with Arad County. It lies on the banks of the Mureș River, with the villages of Pojoga and Sălciva on the left bank and the other component villages on the right bank. The river Almaș flows into the Mureș in Cerbia, while its right tributary, Valea Mare, flows into the Almaș in Pogănești; the river Zam flows into the Mureș in the village of Zam.

Zam is crossed by national road DN7 (part of European route E68), which runs from Bucharest to the border with Hungary, at Nădlac; the county seat, Deva, is 50 km (31 mi) to the east. The Zam train station serves the CFR Line 200, which runs from Brașov to Curtici.

Historical population
Year	Pop.	±%
1850	3,816	—
1910	6,603	+73.0%
1977	3,137	−52.5%
2002	2,148	−31.5%
2011	1,875	−12.7%
2021	1,585	−15.5%
Source: Census data

== Natives ==
- Francisc Hossu-Longin (1847–1935), lawyer and memoirist
