= Dacian fortress of Bretea Mureșană =

Fortified town

- Location within Romania
- 45.9281°N 22.7410°E
- Location: Măgura, Bretea Mureşană, Hunedoara, Romania

Site notes
- Elevation: 268 m (879 ft)
- Condition: Ruined

Monument istoric
- Reference no.: HD-I-s-B-03165

Bretea Mureșană was a Dacian fortified town.
