= Monsters Eating People Eating Monsters... =

Studio album by Frankie and the Witch Fingers
- Released: 2 October 2020
- Length: 45:07
- Label: Greenway Records
- Producer: Frankie and the Witch Fingers

Frankie and the Witch Fingers chronology
ZAM (2019)	Monsters Eating People Eating Monsters... (2020)	Levitation Sessions (Live) (2020)

Singles from Monsters Eating People Eating Monsters...
- 1. "Cavehead" Released: 10 July 2020; 2. "Sweet Freak" Released: 7 August 2020; 3. "Activate" Released: 11 September 2020

Monsters Eating People Eating Monsters... is the sixth studio album by American rock band Frankie and the Witch Fingers. It was released on October 2, 2020, by Greenway Records. This is the first album to feature Nicole "Nikki Pickle" Smith on bass and the last to feature Shaughnessy Starr on drums.

== Composition and recording ==
Following the tour of their previous album ZAM, bassist Alex Bulli left the band, Nicole Smith of Death Valley Girls took his place, and the band started recording a new album.

== Critical reception ==
Professional ratings
Aggregate scores
Source	Rating
Album of the Year	90/100
Review scores
Source	Rating
The Psych Rock	9.5/10
Louder than War	4.5/5 stars
Clash	7/10
Narc Magazine	4.5/5

The album was met with praise from critics. On the aggregate reviewer site Album of the Year it currently holds a 90/100 from critic scores.

In a 4.5/5 bomb review, Louder than War called it "probably the best psych record of the year!" Clash Music called it a "more polished manifestation of their own sound" in a 7/10 review. In a 9.5/10 review, The Psych Rock said the music "soars from garage rock into psychedelic and experimental territory." Narc Magazine said there were "insatiable grooves permeating through every track".

Reviewers called comparisons to the 13th Floor Elevators, the Grateful Dead, Blue Öyster Cult, Thee Oh Sees, Tame Impala, Talking Heads, Goat, Can, and King Gizzard & the Lizard Wizard.

== Track listing ==
All tracks are written by Frankie and the Witch Fingers.

No.	Title	Length
1.	"Activate"	7:56
2.	"Reaper"	3:46
3.	"Sweet Freak"	4:14
4.	"Where's Your Reality?"	4:17
5.	"Michaeldose"	2:20
6.	"Can You Hear Me Now?"	1:07
7.	"Simulator"	6:03
8.	"Urge You"	2:20
9.	"Cavehead"	4:34
10.	"MEPEM..."	8:25
Total length:		45:07

== Personnel ==
Frankie and the Witch Fingers

- Dylan Sizemore - lead vocals, rhythm guitar, percussion
- Josh Menashe - lead guitar, bass, backing vocals, synth, percussion
- Shaughnessy Starr - drums, percussion

Additional personnel

- Josh Menashe - Engineer, Mixing
- Nick Townsend - Mastering
- Mike Kamoo - Recording, Engineer
- Will Sweeney - Artwork
