= Valea Mare (Almaș) =

- Location within Romania

Location
- Country: Romania
- Counties: Hunedoara County
- Villages: Almășel, Pogănești

Physical characteristics
- Mouth: Almaș
  - location: Pogănești
  - coordinates: 46.0590°N 22.4604°E
- Length: 11 km (6.8 mi)
- Basin size: 18 km^{2} (6.9 sq mi)

Basin features
- Progression: Almaș→ Mureș→ Tisza→ Danube→ Black Sea

The Valea Mare is a right tributary of the river Almaș in Romania. It flows into the Almaș in Pogănești. Its length is 11 km (6.8 mi) and its basin size is 18 km^{2} (6.9 sq mi).
