= Burjuc =

- Commune
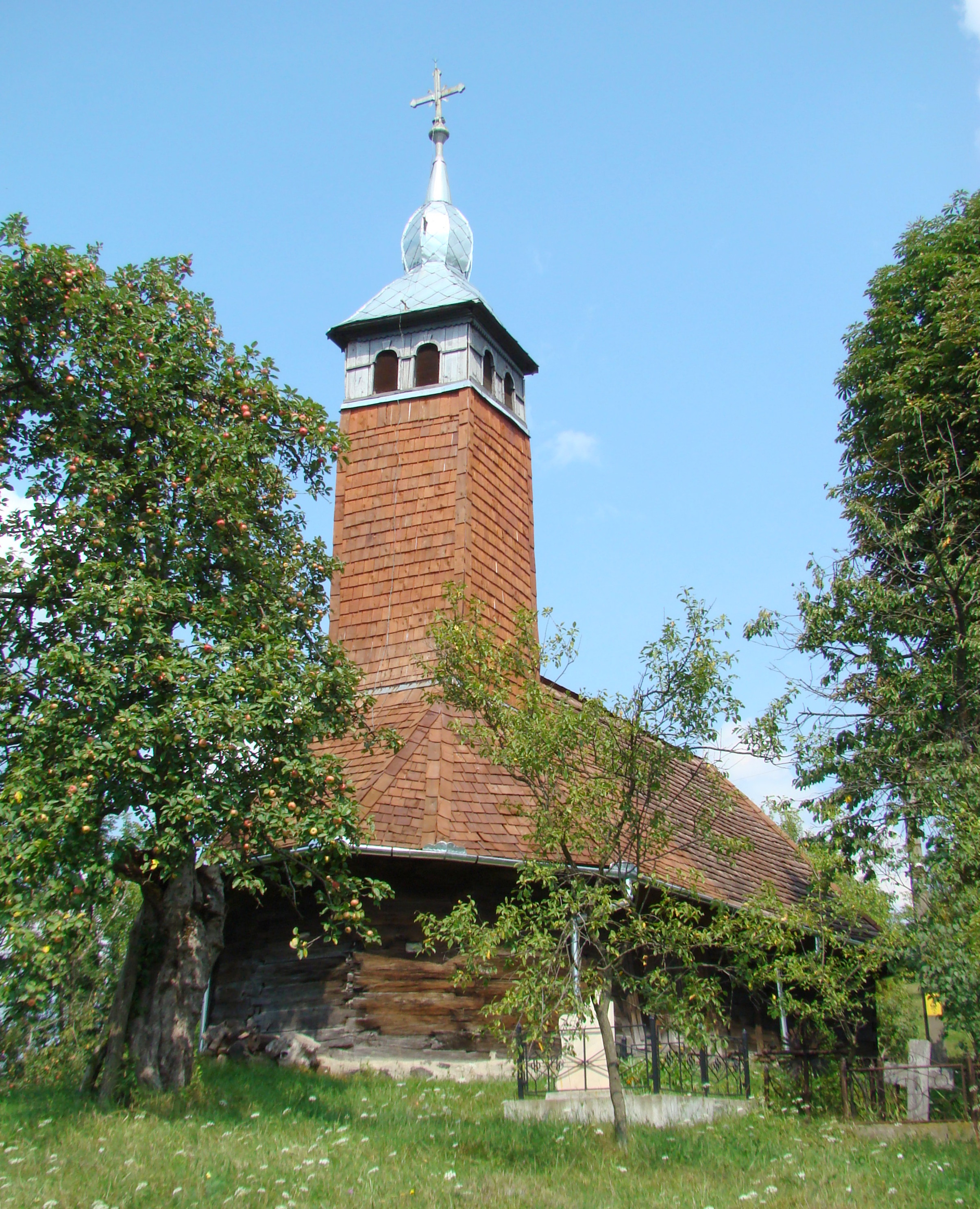
- Wooden church in Brădățel

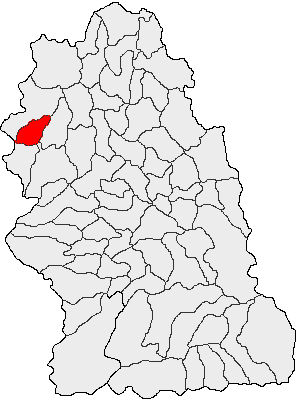
- Location in Hunedoara County

- Location in Romania
- Coordinates: 45°57′N 22°29′E
- Country: Romania
- County: Hunedoara

Government
  - Mayor (2024–2028): Adrian-Ovidiu Bartha (PSD)
- Area: 65.02 km^{2} (25.10 sq mi)
- Elevation: 175 m (574 ft)
- Population (2021-12-01): 734
  - Density: 11.3/km^{2} (29.2/sq mi)
- Time zone: UTC+02:00 (EET)
  - Summer (DST): UTC+03:00 (EEST)
- Postal code: 337165
- Area code: (+40) 02 54
- Vehicle reg.: HD
- Website: comuna-burjuc.ro

Burjuc (Hungarian: Burzsuk) is a commune in Hunedoara County, Romania. It is composed of six villages: Brădățel (Bradacel), Burjuc, Glodghilești (Glodgilesd), Petrești (Petresd), Tătărăști (Tataresd), and Tisa (Tisza).

The commune lies on the banks of the Mureș River and its right tributary, the river Zam. It is located in the northwestern part of Hunedoara County, 41 km (25 mi) west of the county seat, Deva, near the border with Timiș County.

Burjuc is crossed by the national road DN7, part of European route E68. The train station serves the CFR Line 200, which runs from Brașov to Timișoara and on to the Hungarian border.

Historical population
Year	Pop.	±%
1850	3,261	—
1910	3,557	+9.1%
2002	1,012	−71.5%
2011	873	−13.7%
2021	734	−15.9%
Source: Census data
