= Almaș (Mureș) =

Almaș Almás-patak
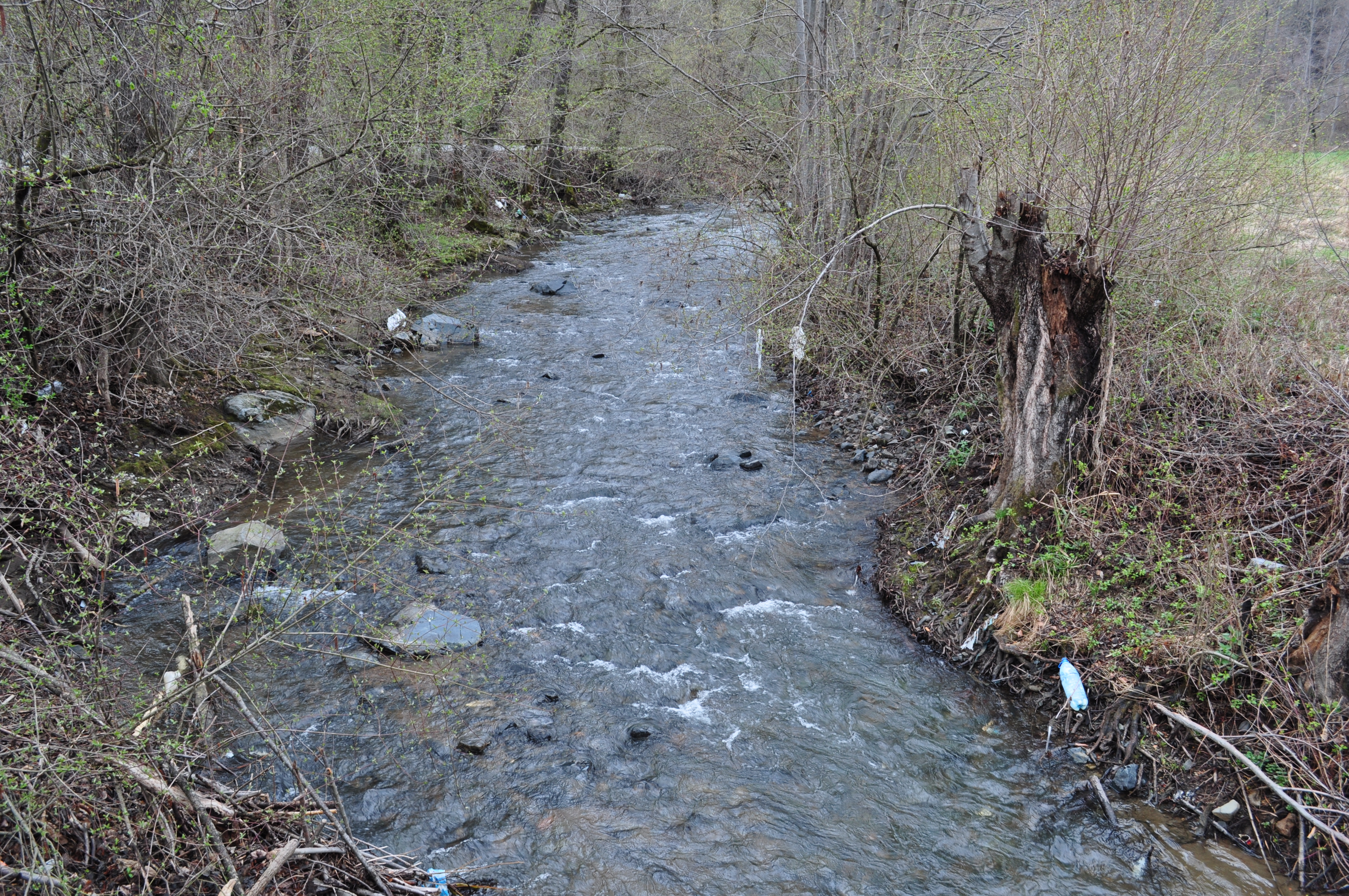

- Location within Romania

Location
- Country: Romania
- Counties: Hunedoara County
- Villages: Almaș-Săliște, Micănești, Pogănești, Cerbia

Physical characteristics
- Mouth: Mureș
  - location: Zam
  - coordinates: 46.0095°N 22.4348°E
- Length: 18 km (11 mi)
- Basin size: 86 km^{2} (33 sq mi)

Basin features
- Progression: Mureș→ Tisza→ Danube→ Black Sea
- Tributaries
  - right: Codru, Cireș, Valea Mare

The Almaș (Hungarian: Almás-patak) is a right tributary of the river Mureș in Romania. It discharges into the Mureș near Zam. Its length is 18 km (11 mi) and its basin size is 86 km^{2} (33 sq mi).
