= Lăpugiu =

- Location within Romania

Location
- Country: Romania
- Counties: Hunedoara County
- Villages: Lăpugiu de Sus, Lăpugiu de Jos

Physical characteristics
- Source: Poiana Ruscă Mountains
- Mouth: Valea Mare
  - location: Lăpugiu de Jos
  - coordinates: 45.8916°N 22.4765°E
- Length: 12 km (7.5 mi)
- Basin size: 27 km^{2} (10 sq mi)

Basin features
- Progression: Valea Mare→ Mureș→ Tisza→ Danube→ Black Sea

The Lăpugiu is a right tributary of the river Valea Mare in Romania. It flows into the Valea Mare in Lăpugiu de Jos. Its length is 12 km (7.5 mi) and its basin size is 27 km^{2} (10 sq mi).
