= Șelimbăr =

- Commune
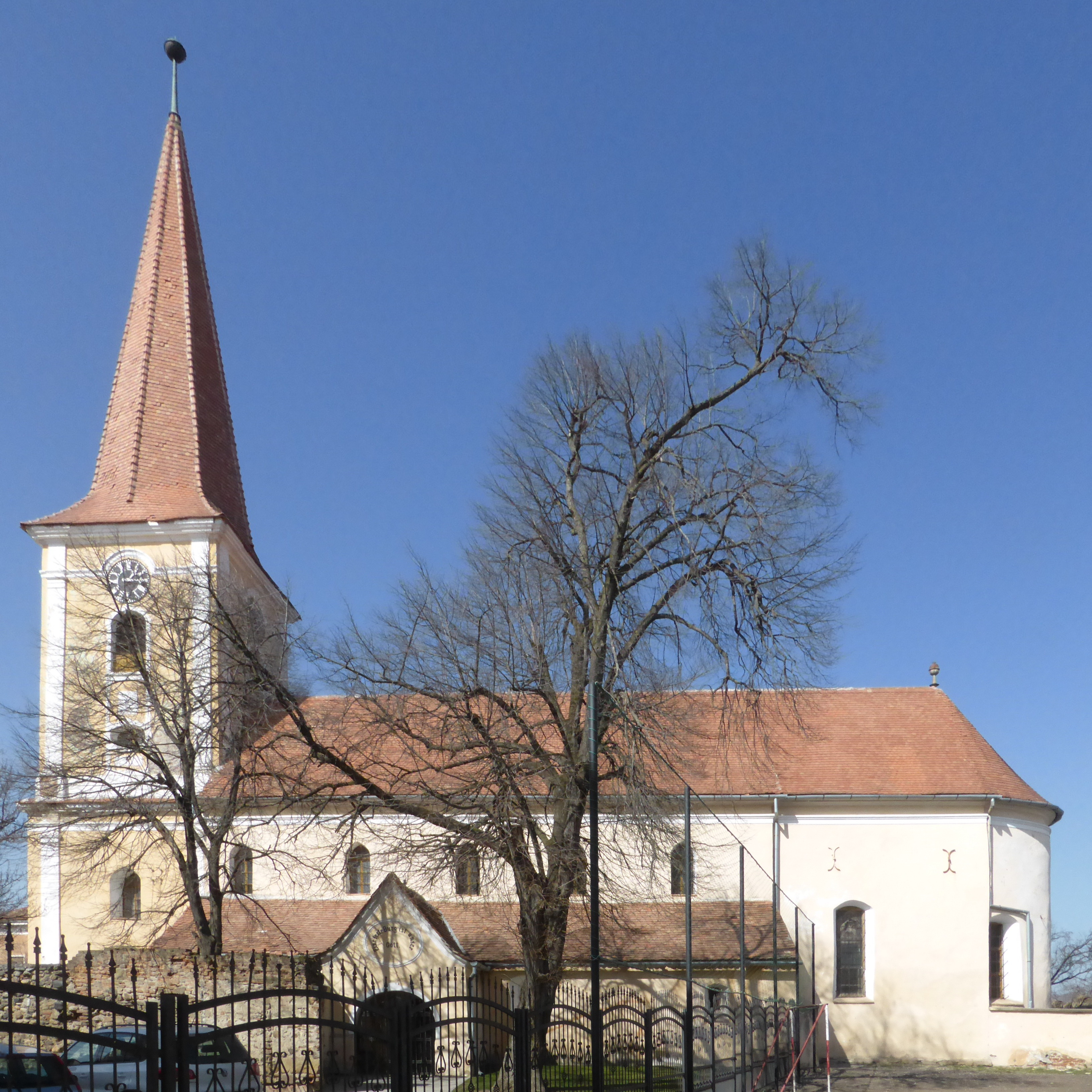
- Evangelical church

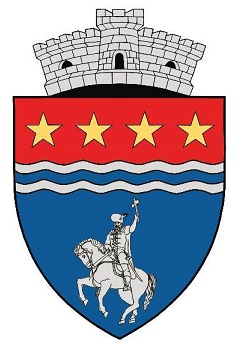
- Coat of arms

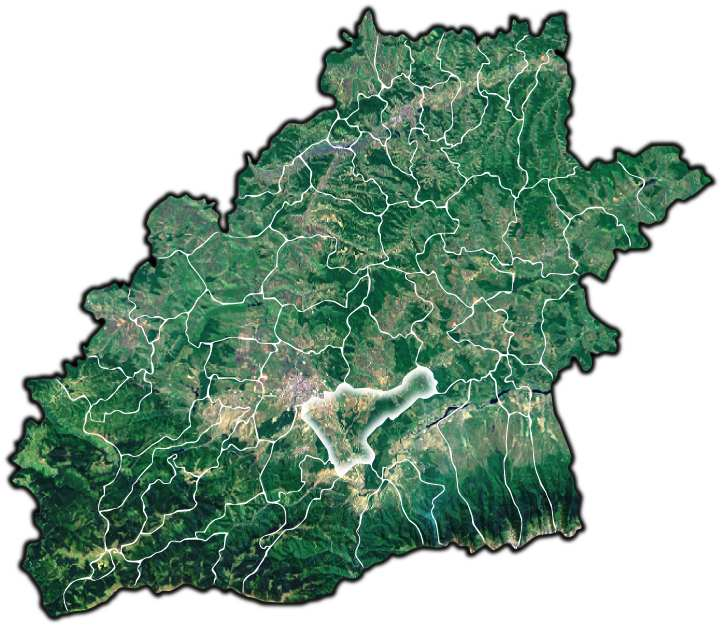
- Location in Sibiu County

- Location in Romania
- Coordinates: 45°46′N 24°12′E
- Country: Romania
- County: Sibiu
- Subdivisions: Șelimbăr, Veștem, Mohu, Bungard

Government
  - Mayor (2020–2024): Marius Grecu (PNL)
- Area: 72.33 km^{2} (27.93 sq mi)
- Elevation: 411 m (1,348 ft)
- Population (2021-12-01): 17,492
  - Density: 241.8/km^{2} (626.4/sq mi)
- Time zone: UTC+02:00 (EET)
  - Summer (DST): UTC+03:00 (EEST)
- Postal code: 557260
- Area code: +40 x69
- Vehicle reg.: SB
- Website: www.primariaselimbar.ro

Șelimbăr (German: Schellenberg; Hungarian: Sellenberk) is a commune in central Romania, in the county of Sibiu in Transylvania, to the east of the county seat Sibiu. The village of Șelimbăr has been known to exist since 1323 and is the site of the Battle of Șelimbăr.

The commune is composed of four villages:

- Bungard (German: Baumgarten; Hungarian: Bongárd) – 382 inhabitants
- Mohu (German: Moichen; Hungarian: Móh) – 543 inhabitants
- Șelimbăr – 2,859 inhabitants
- Veștem (German: Westen; Hungarian: Vesztény) – 1,483 inhabitants

The commune is crossed by national road DN7.

== Culture and recreation ==
A medieval fortified church in Șelimbăr was built in the early 13th century as a Romanesque basilica. The tower was later demolished, and the current tower originates from 1804. The interior is in Baroque style. The church was enclosed by a double wall, only the fragments of the wall survive.

== Natives ==
- Toma Dordea (1921–2015), Romanian academician and electrical machines specialist (from Bungard)
- Achim Stoia (1910–1973), Romanian composer, conductor and academic (from Mohu)

== Notes ==
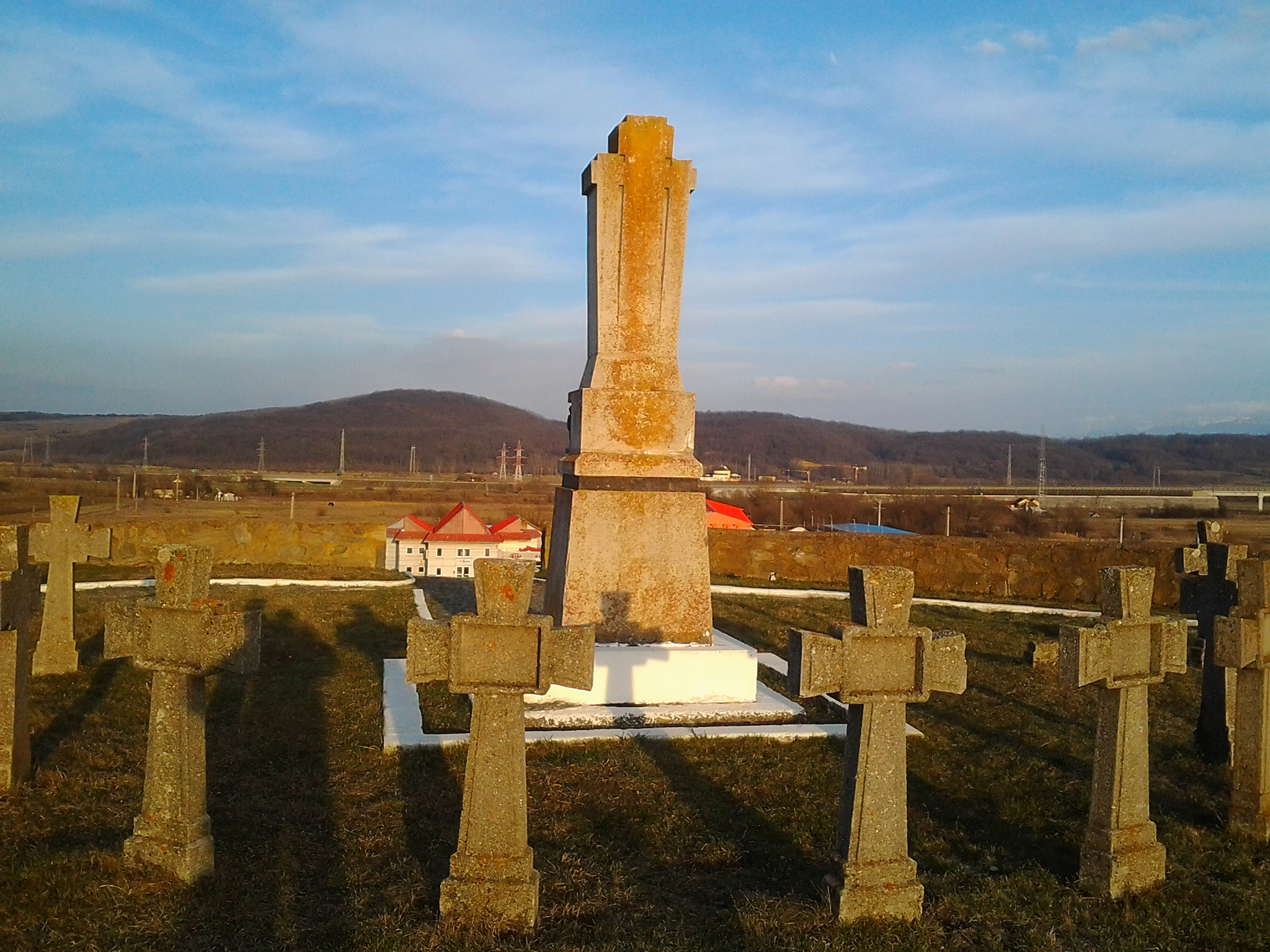
Șelimbăr memorial

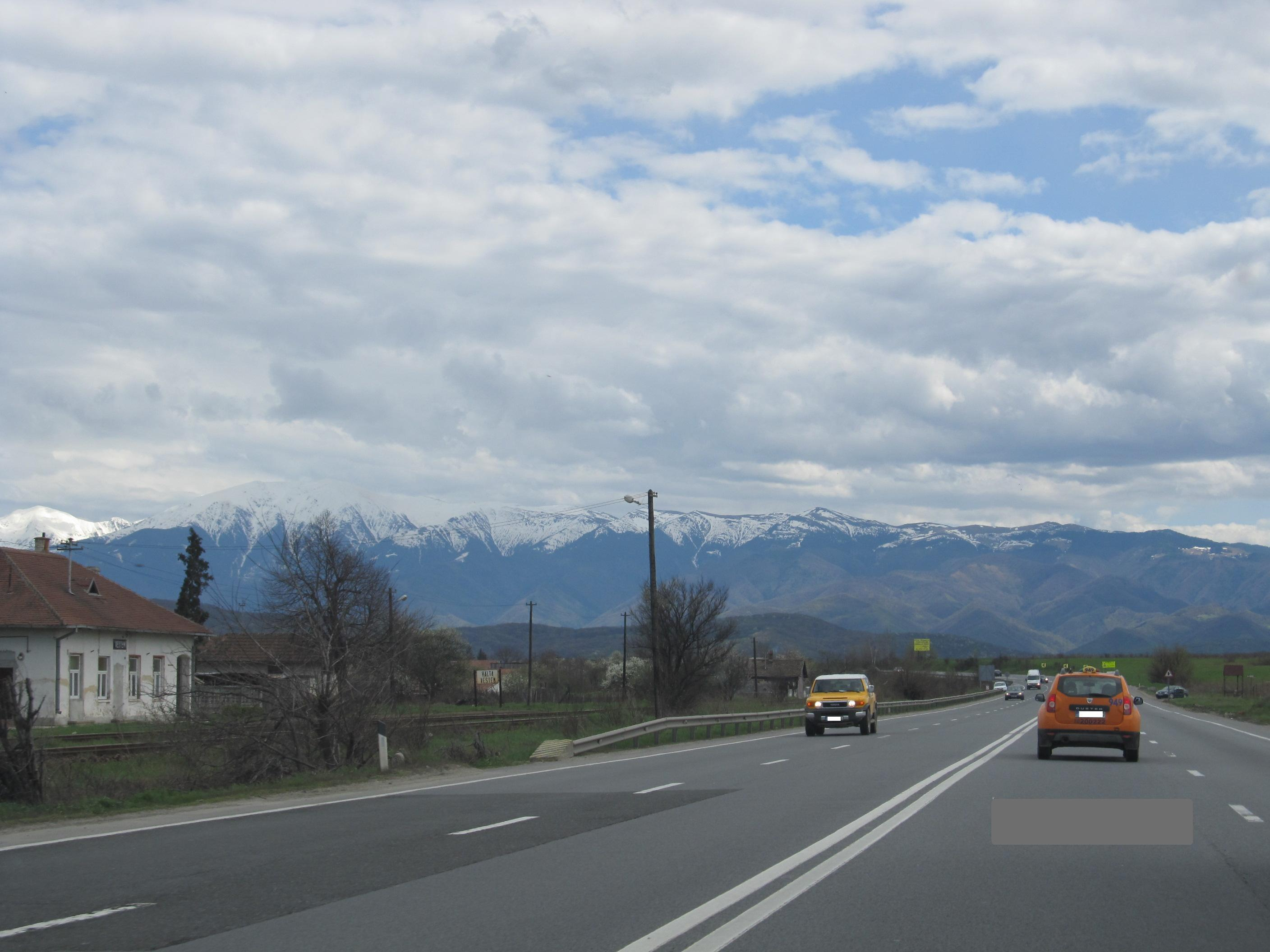
DN7 road in Veștem
