= Dumești (river) =

- Location within Romania

Location
- Country: Romania
- Counties: Hunedoara County
- Villages: Dumești

Physical characteristics
- Mouth: Sârbi
  - location: Sârbi
  - coordinates: 45.9678°N 22.6986°E
- Length: 14 km (8.7 mi)
- Basin size: 27 km^{2} (10 sq mi)

Basin features
- Progression: Sârbi→ Mureș→ Tisza→ Danube→ Black Sea

The Dumești is a left tributary of the Sârbi in Romania. It flows into the Sârbi near the village Sârbi. Its length is 14 km (8.7 mi) and its basin size is 27 km^{2} (10 sq mi).
