= Data Doom =

Studio album by Frankie and the Witch Fingers
- Released: September 1, 2023
- Length: 41:29
- Label: Greenway Records
- Producer: Frankie and the Witch Fingers

Frankie and the Witch Fingers chronology
Levitation Sessions (Live) (2020)	Data Doom (2023)	Live at LEVITATION (2024)

Singles from Data Doom
- 1. "Electricide B/W Chalice" Released: 21 October 2022; 2. "Mild Davis" Released: 14 June 2023; 3. "Futurephobic" Released: 12 July 2023; 4. "Empire" Released: 16 August 2023

Data Doom is the seventh studio album by American rock band Frankie and the Witch Fingers. It was released on September 1, 2023, by Greenway Records. This is the first album to feature Nick Aguilar on drums.

== Composition and recording ==
With the addition of Smith and Aguilar the band shifted focus to a more rhythmic approach feeling the influence of the new members. Sizemore said of the album themes he was conceptually interested in "Technology and how it’s been affecting humanity both negatively and positively", and that these themes affected the lyrics and songwriting.

== Critical reception ==
Professional ratings
Review scores
Source	Rating
The Arts Desk	4/5 stars
Louder than War	4/5 stars
Exclaim!	8/10

In a 4-out-of-5 star review by The Arts Desk, they described the album as "proto-punkers Blue Öyster Cult at their most forceful getting down with Scandi psychedelicists Goat and it's a total blast." In a 4-out-of-5 bomb review by Louder than War, they view the songs as "they shift and surge through a haze of deep fuzz, rising from a burning inferno to the sulpher-lined clouds above.", while comparing the band's style combinations to that of King Gizzard & the Lizard Wizard. Exclaim! Magazine called it "their most complex and intense album to date".

== Track listing ==
All tracks are written by Frankie and the Witch Fingers.

No.	Title	Length
1.	"Empire"	7:28
2.	"Burn Me Down"	3:08
3.	"Electricide"	3:35
4.	"Syster System"	6:17
5.	"Weird Dog"	3:57
6.	"Doom Boom"	4:10
7.	"Futurephobic"	3:38
8.	"Mild Davis"	4:46
9.	"Political Cannibalism"	4:25
Total length:		41:29

== Personnel ==
Frankie and the Witch Fingers

- Dylan Sizemore – lead vocals, rhythm guitar
- Josh Menashe – lead guitar, backing vocals, synth
- Nicole "Nikki Pickle" Smith – bass
- Nick Aguilar – drums

Additional personnel

- Josh Menashe – recording, mixing
- Nick Townsend – mastering
- Carlo Schievano – artwork
- Jordan Warren – logo and typography
