= European route E68 =

Road in trans-European E-road network

E68

Route information
- Length: 499 km (310 mi)

Major junctions
- West end: Szeged, Hungary
- East end: Brașov, Romania

Location
- Countries: Hungary; Romania

Highway system
- International E-road network; A Class; B Class

European route E68 forms part of the United Nations International E-road network, linking Hungary with Romania. It starts in Szeged, Hungary, and ends in Brașov, Romania. Its total length is 529 km (329 mi) of which 52 km (32 mi) are in Hungary and 477 km (296 mi) in Romania.

Its route is: Szeged – Makó – Nădlac – Pecica – Arad – Lipova – Deva – Simeria – Orăștie – Sebeș – Sibiu – Șelimbăr – Făgăraș – Brașov.

== Itinerary ==
Hungary

- M43: Szeged ( E75) – Makó – Csanádpalota

Romania

- A 1: Nădlac
- DN7G: Nădlac
- DN7: Nădlac – Arad ( E671) – Lipova – Ilia (Start of concurrency with E673) – Deva (Start of concurrency with E79, end of concurrency with E673) – Simeria (End of concurrency with E79) – Orăștie – Sebeș (Start of concurrency with E81) – Sibiu – Veștem (End of concurrency with E81)
- DN1: Veștem – Făgăraș – Brașov ( E60)
