= Zam (river) =

Zam Zám-patak
- Location within Romania

Location
- Country: Romania
- Counties: Hunedoara County
- Villages: Godinești, Petrești, Glodghilești, Zam

Physical characteristics
- Mouth: Mureș
  - location: Zam
  - coordinates: 45.9905°N 22.4290°E
- Length: 20 km (12 mi)
- Basin size: 70 km^{2} (27 sq mi)

Basin features
- Progression: Mureș→ Tisza→ Danube→ Black Sea
- Tributaries
  - left: Zamșor
  - right: Dobrița, Tămășești

The Zam (Hungarian: Zám-patak) is a right tributary of the river Mureș in the historical region of Transylvania, Romania. It discharges into the Mureș in the village Zam. Its length is 20 km (12 mi) and its basin size is 70 km^{2} (27 sq mi).
