= Frankie and the Witch Fingers =

American rock band (2013–)

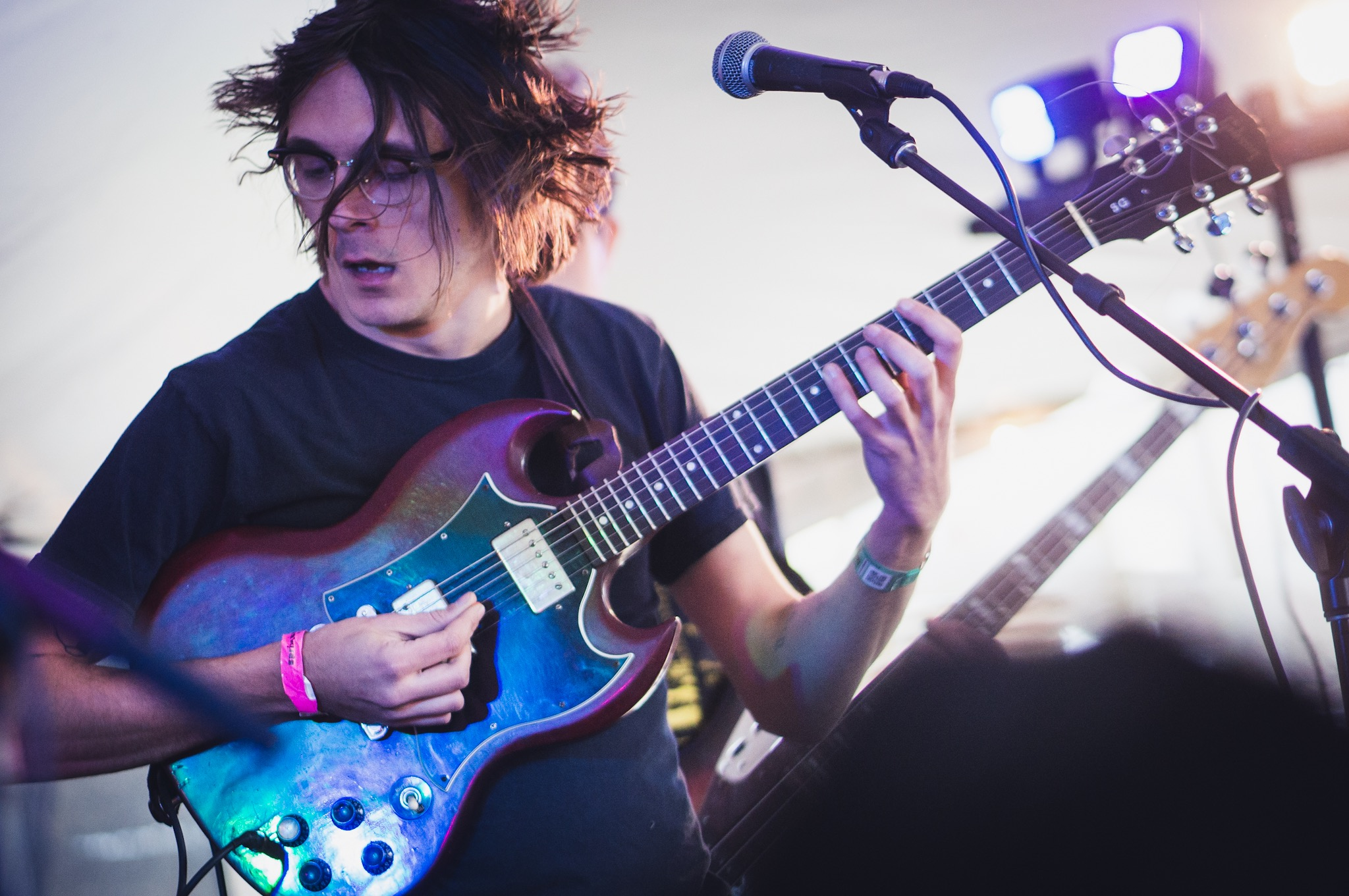
- Dylan Sizemore of Frankie and the Witch Fingers in 2019

Background information
- Origin: Bloomington, Indiana
- Genres: Indie rock; garage rock; post punk; psychedelic rock
- Years active: since 2013
- Labels: Greenway Records, Permanent Records
- Members: Dylan Sizemore; Josh Menashe; Nicole "Nikki Pickle" Smith; Nick Aguilar; Jon Modaff
- Past members: Glenn Brigman; Alex Bulli; Shaughnessy Starr; Josh Morrow
- Website: frankieandthewitchfingers.com

Frankie and the Witch Fingers is an American rock band formed in Bloomington, Indiana, in 2013 and based in Los Angeles. The band is composed of founders Dylan Sizemore (vocals and rhythm guitar) and Josh Menashe (vocals, lead guitar, synthesizer), Nikki Pickle (bass) as of 2020, Nick Aguilar (drums) as of 2022 and Jon Modaff (synths) as of 2025. They are signed to Greenway Records of Brooklyn.

== History ==
=== 2013–2018: Bloomington years and formation ===
The band was started by Sizemore, who formed the project as a solo outlet to perform in basement shows, singing and playing the electric guitar and a kick drum. In the Bloomington basement show scene, he met founding members Glenn Brigman and Josh Menashe. Brigman invited Sizemore to record at the home recording studio that he shared with Menashe, where they recorded their band Triptides. Sizemore went on to play bass for Triptides on and off.

Their name came from Sizemore's cat Frankie.

During the first recording, Brigman offered to play drums on the tracks and quickly recruited two of the other founding members of the band including Menashe, and Josh Morrow (second drummer) to join the recording effort. This album would become the first Frankie and the Witch Fingers release on a cassette, titled Sidewalk (2013), released by Nice Legs Records. Sidewalk was recorded to a Tascam 488 by Brigman. Sidewalk primarily blended garage rock and surf music. Alex Bulli (bass), who played in Prince Moondog with Menashe and Brigman, was recruited to fill out the 5-piece lineup for live shows. The band played a handful of shows as a 5-piece, until Morrow exited the band later that year, which then performed and recorded as a 4-piece group from 2013 to 2018, producing four full-length albums and two 7-inch records together.

The band's second release was a song included on a 4-way split 7-inch with Triptides, The See See, and The Young Sinclairs featuring the unreleased track "Revival" in 2014 on Stroll On Records. Permanent Records (Chicago and Los Angeles) heard the track "Revival" from the split and contacted the band about a partnership to release their newest recordings. Permanent released the band's subsequent eponymously titled album, Frankie and the Witch Fingers (2015), their first release on vinyl.

Brigman, Menashe, and Bulli moved to Los Angeles in 2014. Sizemore flew to Los Angeles for the band's first tour in March 2015, and moved there later that year. After arriving in Los Angeles they met Stu Pope at a show at Permanent Records shop in Highland Park. On April 1, 2016, they released the first single from their next album that included tracks "Merry-Go-Round" and "Mystical Rapture" on the Merry-Go-Round 7″ through Hypnotic Bridge Records (Sierra Madre, Calif.) as the first release for Stu Pope's new label. Permanent Records then released the full-length Heavy Roller LP (July 29, 2016). Heavy Roller saw the band venture into new territory with songs that ranged from psych pop to stretched out acid rock jams.

After the release of Heavy Roller, the band set about recording a new album in Los Angeles, in the recording studio that they shared with Levitation Room, on a 388 tape machine borrowed from a friend. Released on September 15, 2017, by Permanent Records, Brain Telephone continued expanding upon the band's psychedelic sound by blending rhythm and blues-style rock n' roll and emphasizing some of their southern rock influences in the mix. It was described as a clear evolution into their "harder-edged garage rock face-melting style" of their later work.

In 2018 they met the band Twin Temple and went into their home studio to record their next release with Twin Temple's Zachary James, a 7″ featuring tracks "Drip" and "Tea" released on May 18 by Let's Pretend Records (Bloomington, Indiana)

=== 2018–2022: ZAM, Monsters Eating People Eating Monsters, lineup changes ===
In July 2018 following a long stint of tours, Brigman exited to focus his efforts on his band Triptides, and drummer Shaugnessy Starr (ex. Psychic Ju-Jitsu, Hooveriii, Triptides) joined the group in his place.

Shaughnessy Starr immediately began working with the band to write their next record. In September 2018, touring the US with Stonefield from Australia, their set consisted almost entirely of unreleased material that would be recorded for ZAM later that month.

Recorded at Zachary James' home studio called Studio 666 and engineered by James and Kevin Mills, ZAM was their first full-length album completely recorded by a non–band member. For ZAM, the band adopted a more rhythmically driven sound and drew on new influences of Krautrock, jazz, and funk.

From ZAM (2019), a double album, a 7" single was released, "Pleasure"/"Realization (acoustic demo)". "Cavehead"/"Mind's Eye" followed in 2020 from Monsters Eating People Eating Monsters…, a concept album in which all the songs transition continuously from one to the next without any breaks between tracks.

At the end of 2019, Alex Bulli exited the band and bassist Nikki "Pickle" Smith (ex-Death Valley Girls) joined the group playing one show with the band in Chicago before the shutdown of the COVID-19 pandemic. During the height of the lockdown phase of 2020, the group met up and recorded a few live sessions, one of which was streamed live and released on vinyl and video through Levitation (Reverberation Appreciation Society) and Greenway Records as Levitation Sessions: Frankie and the Witch Fingers (2020). The next 7-inch single on Greenway Records, "Cookin'"/"Tracksuit", came out in 2021.

With Starr's exit near the middle of 2021, drummer Jon Modaff (Hooveriii, GROOP, Primitive Ring, Sweet Country Meat Boys) filled in for the band's first post-pandemic tour before Nick Aguilar (Slaughterhouse, Mike Watt, etc.) became the new current full-time drummer. The new lineup played their first show together on April 30, 2022.

=== Since 2022: Data Doom, live albums, Trash Classic ===
On October 21, 2022, the band released the 7" single "Electricide/Chalice", the first new material with Aguilar, as well as a music video for Electricide. On June 14, 2023, the band announced their new album Data Doom to be released on September 1 with the release of a new single, "Mild Davis", inspired by the jazz musician Miles Davis. Two more singles were released preceding Data Doom: "Futurephobic" on July 12 and "Empire" August 16. Music videos were released for all three singles.

For Record Store Day on April 20, 2024, the band released the live album Live at Levitation. The album is a recording of their performance at the Levitation 2022 festival in Austin, Texas. On September 25, 2024, the band released a new single, "Bonehead". A visualizer for the song was released on October 2, and another single, "i-Candy", was released on October 9. The two songs were released together as a double A-side 7" single.

From March 11 to 15, 2025, the band played thirteen shows at thirteen different venues across Austin, Texas for SXSW 2025. On March 11, the band announced their new album Trash Classic to be released on June 6. Alongside the announcement, a new single "Economy" was released. The music video was released on March 13, and a second single, "Total Reset", was released on April 9 with a lyric video.

For Record Store Day 2025 on April 12, the band released another live album, Live at KEXP. The album is a recording of their performance in the KEXP Gathering Space in Seattle on July 23, 2024. This performance marks the unofficial return of Jon Modaff to the band, playing synths rather than drums. On May 1, 2025, the band confirmed that Modaff is an official member of the band. "We've grown a new limb. His name's Jon... [he plays] synths, guitar, mystery gadgets... whatever's in reach. Now it's official. He's in the band".

== Notable performances ==
Frankie and the Witch Fingers performed as an opening act for ZZ Top and Cheap Trick on a handful of those bands' 2019 US tour dates. They have also opened for Osees at the Bataclan Theatre in Paris, Ty Segall at Troxy Theater in London, and Porno for Pyros in June 2022.

== Musical style ==
In a 2026 interview, lead guitarist Josh Menashe described the evolution of his writing technique for guitar riffs. Rather than sitting down and trying to write one, he walks around thinking of them and how they may sound, and then tries to play them the way they sound in his mind.

== Band members ==
Active members

- Dylan Sizemore – lead vocals, rhythm guitar (since 2013)
- Josh Menashe – lead guitar, backing vocals, synthesizer, sax, flute, engineering, etc. (since 2013)
- Nicole "Nikki Pickle" Smith – bass (since 2020)
- Nick Aguilar – drums (since 2022)
- Jon Modaff – synths (since 2024), drums (2021)

Former members

- Glenn Brigman – drums, organ, engineering, etc. (2013–2018)
- Alex Bulli – bass (2013–2019)
- Josh Morrow – drums (2013)
- Shaughnessy Starr – drums (2018–2021)

Timeline

== Discography ==
Studio albums

- Sidewalk (2013)
- Frankie and the Witch Fingers (2015)
- Heavy Roller (2016)
- Brain Telephone (2017)
- ZAM (2019)
- Monsters Eating People Eating Monsters... (2020)
- Data Doom (2023)
- Trash Classic (2025)

Live albums

- Daytrotter Session – Mar 26, 2017 (2017)
- Daytrotter Session – Oct 31, 2017 (2017)
- Levitation Sessions (2020)
- Live at Levitation (2024)
- Live at KEXP (2025)

EPs

- 4-way split 7" (with The See See, The Young Sinclairs, and Triptides) (2014)
- Merry-go-round (2016)
- Drip/Tea (2018)
- Pleasure (2019)
- Cavehead (2020)
- Cookin' (2021)
- Electricide/Chalice (2022)
- Bonehead/i-Candy (2024)
- Economy (2025)
