= ZAM (album) =

Studio album by Frankie and the Witch Fingers
- Released: March 1, 2019
- Length: 60:16
- Label: Greenway Records
- Producer: Frankie and the Witch Fingers

Frankie and the Witch Fingers chronology
Brain Telephone (2017)	ZAM (2019)	Monsters Eating People Eating Monsters… (2020)

Singles from ZAM
- 1. "Pleasure" Released: 25 January 2019

ZAM is the fifth studio album by American rock band Frankie and the Witch Fingers. It was released on March 1, 2019, by Greenway Records. This is the last album to feature founding member Alex Bulli on bass and the first of two albums (the other being Monsters Eating People Eating Monsters…) to feature Shaughnessy Starr on drums.

== Composition and recording ==
ZAM is the band's longest album and only double-vinyl release. Describing the recording process, Menashe said "We basically just rehearsed the songs for a month straight: tweaking them, getting the structures right, getting the feel right and got it to the point where we had five days in the studio. We were able to track every song in at least three takes or under. And you know, there are mistakes. I think the bass gets unplugged on a song, and we just left it."

== Critical reception ==
Professional ratings
Aggregate scores
Source	Rating
Album of the Year	77/100
Review scores
Source	Rating
The Fire Note	4.5/5 stars
AllMusic	4/5
The Skinny	4/4 stars

Critics have generally liked the album. Aggregate reviewer Album of the Year has given the album a 77/100 based on critic reviews.

In a 4.5/5 headphone review, the Fire Note said "ZAM is an album that takes the punk, psychedelics, and the psychotic sock-hop vibe and recasts it as their own." The Skinny called the album "an expansion and a refinement on what has come prior; broader in its scope, maturer in its delivery, and braver in its exploration." In a 4-star review... AllMusic editors rated the album 4/5 stars.

Paste Magazine called the opening song the "album's peak".

== Track listing ==
All tracks are written by Frankie and the Witch Fingers.

No.	Title	Length
1.	"Dracula Drug"	8:55
2.	"Work"	4:12
3.	"Realization"	4:40
4.	"Pleasure"	3:52
5.	"ZAM"	8:27
6.	"Cobwebs"	4:22
7.	"Dark Sorcerer"	4:45
8.	"Purple Velvet"	4:44
9.	"I Am"	1:07
10.	"Underneath You"	9:29
11.	"Head Collector"	5:43
Total length:		60:16

== Personnel ==
Frankie and the Witch Fingers

- Dylan Sizemore – lead vocals, rhythm guitar
- Josh Menashe – lead guitar, backing vocals, synth
- Alex Bulli – bass
- Shaughnessy Starr – drums

Additional personnel

- Josh Menashe – engineer, mixing
- Nick Townsend – mastering
- Kevin Mills – engineer
- Zachary James – engineer
