= Vorța =

- Commune
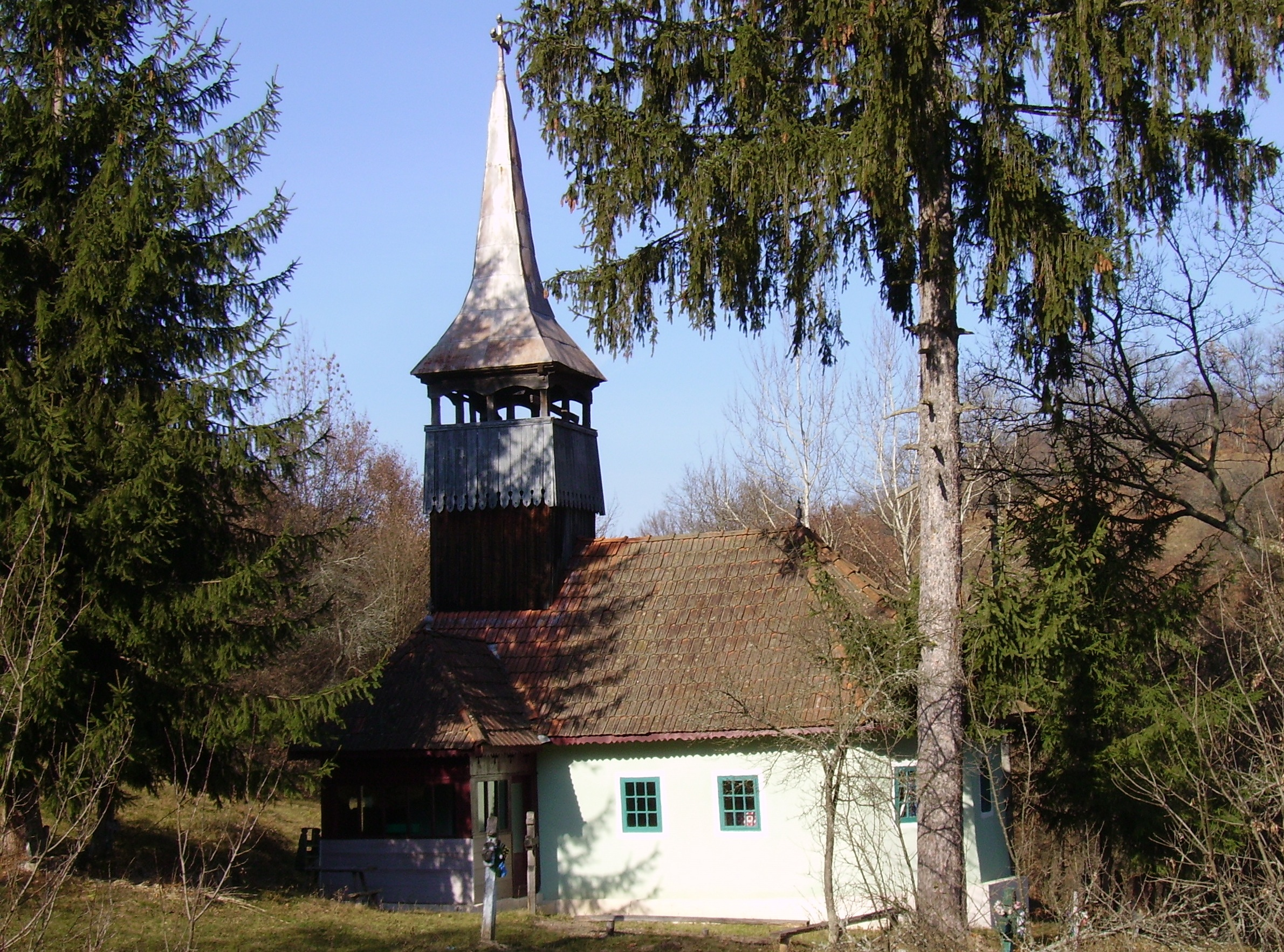
- Wooden church in Luncșoara

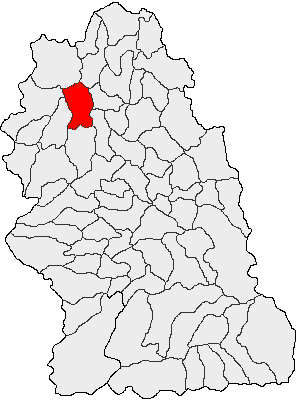
- Location in Hunedoara County

- Location in Romania
- Coordinates: 46°1′N 22°41′E
- Country: Romania
- County: Hunedoara

Government
  - Mayor (2024–2028): Flavius Eduard Benea (PSD)
- Area: 102.86 km^{2} (39.71 sq mi)
- Elevation: 250 m (820 ft)
- Population (2021-12-01): 748
  - Density: 7.27/km^{2} (18.8/sq mi)
- Time zone: UTC+02:00 (EET)
  - Summer (DST): UTC+03:00 (EEST)
- Postal code: 337540
- Area code: (+40) 02 54
- Vehicle reg.: HD
- Website: primariavorta.ro

Vorța (Hungarian: Vorca; German: Wartsdorf) is a commune in Hunedoara County, Transylvania, Romania. It is composed of seven villages: Certeju de Jos (Alsócsertés), Coaja (Kózsa), Dumești (Dumesd), Luncșoara (Lunksora), Valea Poienii (until 1960 Băgara; Füzesdbogara), Visca (Viszka), and Vorța.

The commune is located in the northwestern part of Hunedoara County, 34 km (21 mi) from the county seat, Deva. It lies in a hilly area at the foot of the Metaliferi Mountains, on the banks of the river Sârbi and its tributary, the river Dumești. Vorța village is traversed by the county road DJ706; the other six villages are mostly scattered settlements that can be reached on unpaved roads from the commune center.

Historical population
Year	Pop.	±%
1850	2,856	—
1910	4,169	+46.0%
2002	1,082	−74.0%
2011	876	−19.0%
2021	748	−14.6%
Source: Census data
