= DN7 =

Road in Romania

National Road 7
- Drumul Național 7

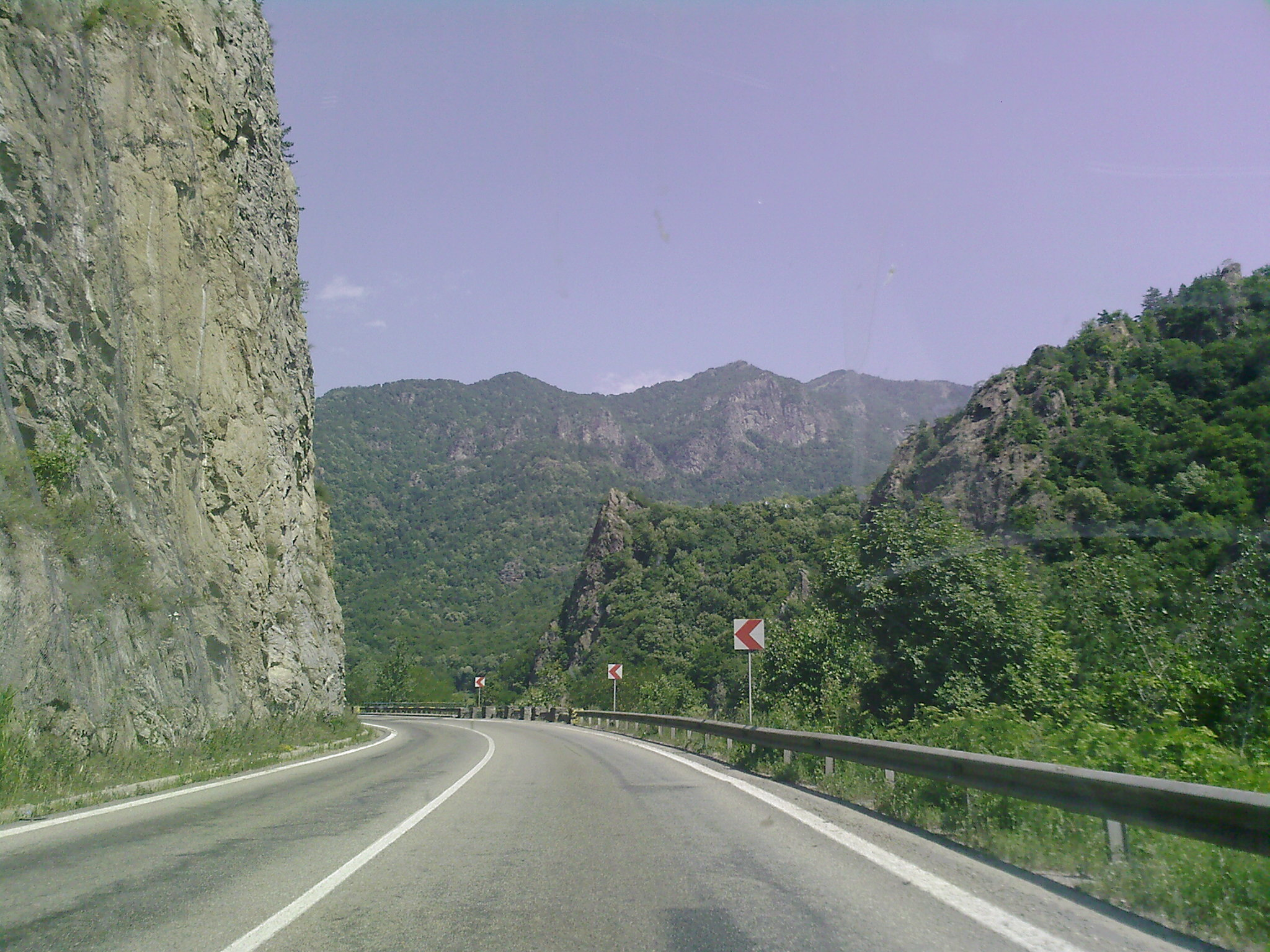

Route information
- Part of E68 / E81
- Maintained by Compania Națională de Autostrăzi și Drumuri Naționale din România
- Length: 525 km (326 mi)

Major junctions
- South end: Bucharest
- List: DN71 at Tărtășești; DN72 at Găești; DN73 at Pitești; A1 at Bascov; DN7C at Bascov; DN73C at Mălureni; DN64 at Râmnicu Vâlcea; DN7A at Brezoi; DN1 at Tălmaciu; DN67C at Sebeș; DN1 at Sebeș; DN66 at Simeria; DN68B at Deva; DN76 at Șoimuș; DN68A at Ilia; DN69 at Arad; DN79 at Arad
- West end: Nădlac (Hungarian border)

Location
- Country: Romania
- Counties: Ilfov, Dâmbovița, Argeș, Vâlcea, Sibiu, Alba, Hunedoara, Arad
- Major cities: Bucharest, Pitești, Râmnicu Vâlcea, Sibiu, Deva, Arad

Highway system
- Roads in Romania; Highways

DN7 (Romanian: Drumul Național 7) is a national road in Romania, which links Bucharest with the Banat region, in western Romania. It is further to the eastern European capitals Budapest and Belgrade via the border with Hungary at Nădlac. It is a high-traffic road and the preferred route for trucks. Near Râmnicu Vâlcea, the road crosses the Southern Carpathians along the Olt River, through the Valea Oltului touristic region.

Municipalities crossed by the road include Bucharest, Pitești, Râmnicu Vâlcea, Sibiu, Sebeș, Deva, and Arad, ending at the town of Nădlac. Between Tălmaciu and Sebeș, the national road and DN1 intersect.

The national road DN7 has two ramifications in Arad County. The first one is DN7B, which connects the national road to Turnu, where there is another border crossing with Hungary, whereas DN7G serves as the link between the road at Nădlac and the A1 motorway near the Nădlac II–Csanádpalota border crossing.

Most of the traffic formerly carried by the national road between Bucharest – Pitești and Sibiu – Nădlac now takes the A1 motorway, which will also carry most traffic between Pitești and Sibiu upon its completion.

== See also ==
- Transfăgărășan
