= Ilia, Hunedoara =

Ilia
- Commune
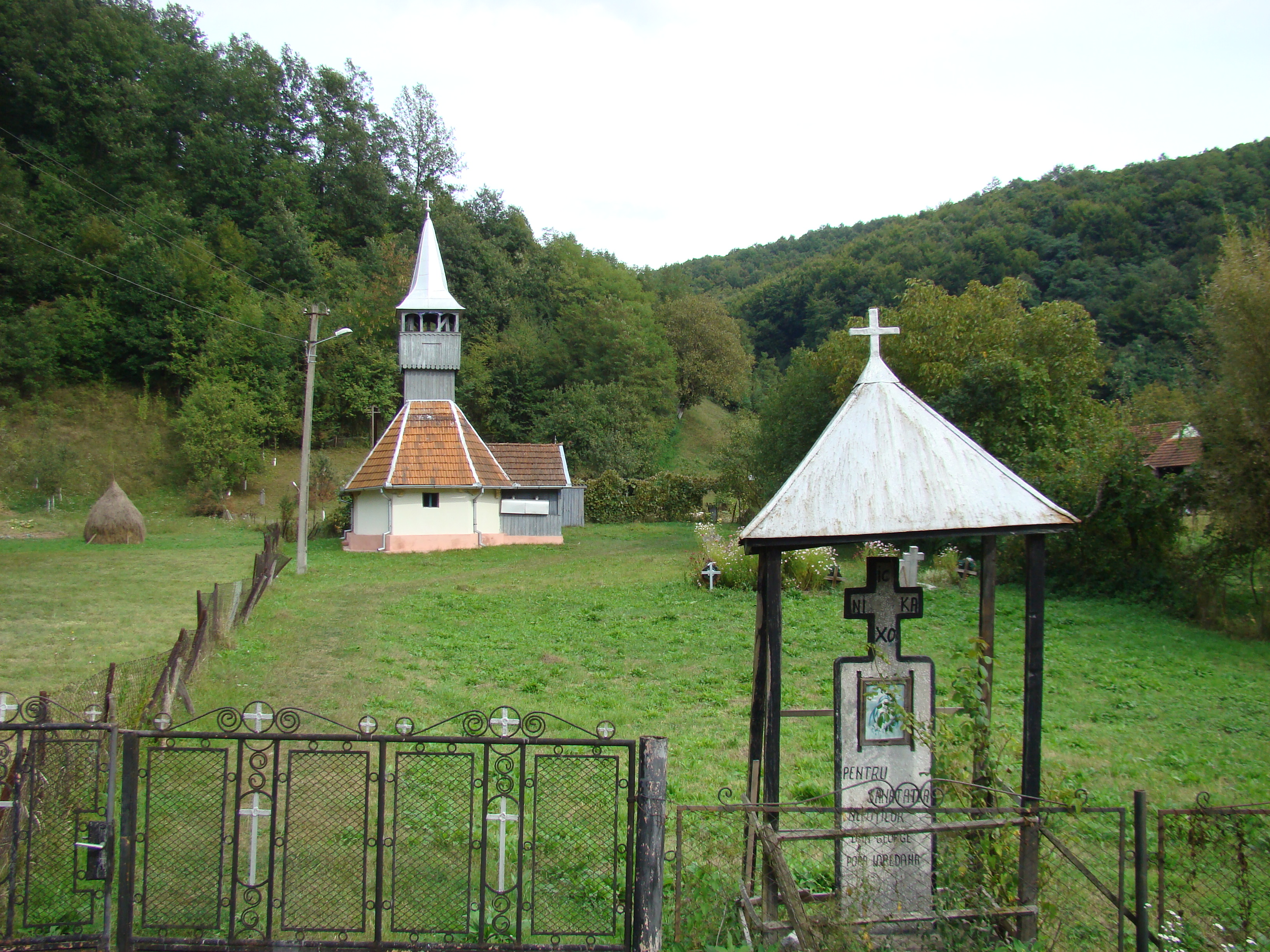
- Wooden church in Valea Lungă

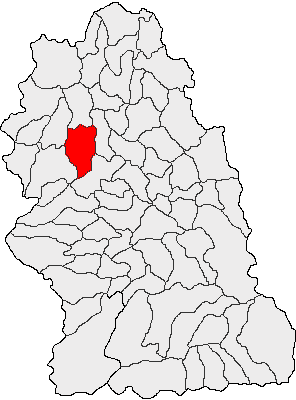
- Location in Hunedoara County

- Location in Romania
- Coordinates: 45°56′N 22°39′E
- Country: Romania
- County: Hunedoara

Government
  - Mayor (2020–2024): Gabriel Marius Omota (PNL)
- Area: 91.38 km^{2} (35.28 sq mi)
- Elevation: 185 m (607 ft)
- Population (2021-12-01): 3,144
  - Density: 34.41/km^{2} (89.11/sq mi)
- Time zone: UTC+02:00 (EET)
  - Summer (DST): UTC+03:00 (EEST)
- Postal code: 337270
- Area code: (+40) 02 54
- Vehicle reg.: HD
- Website: primariailia.ro

Ilia (Hungarian: Marosillye, German: Elienmarkt) is a commune in Hunedoara County, Romania. The commune lies in the historical province of Transylvania. It is composed of nine villages: Bacea (Bácsfalva), Bretea Mureșană (Marosbrettye), Brâznic (Briznik), Cuieș (Kulyes), Dumbrăvița (Dumbravica), Ilia, Săcămaș (Szakamás), Sârbi (Szirb), and Valea Lungă (Valealunga).

The commune is located in the central part of Hunedoara County, 26 km (16 mi) west of the county seat, Deva. It lies on the right bank of the Mureș River, southwest of the Metaliferi Mountains and north of the Poiana Ruscă Mountains.

The Ilia train station serves the CFR Main Line 200, running from Brașov towards Timișoara and the border with Hungary, as well as Line 212, connecting Ilia to Lugoj. The national road DN7 (part of E68) crosses the commune, meeting the A1 motorway just north of Ilia.

Historical population
| Year | Pop. | ±% |
|---|---|---|
| 1850 | 3,924 | — |
| 1900 | 5,394 | +37.5% |
| 1956 | 5,149 | −4.5% |
| 1992 | 4,198 | −18.5% |
| 2002 | 4,022 | −4.2% |
| 2011 | 3,662 | −9.0% |
| 2021 | 3,144 | −14.1% |
Source: Census data

== Notable people ==
- Gabriel Bethlen (1580 in Marosillye – 1629), Prince of Transylvania from 1613 to 1629.

== Gallery ==
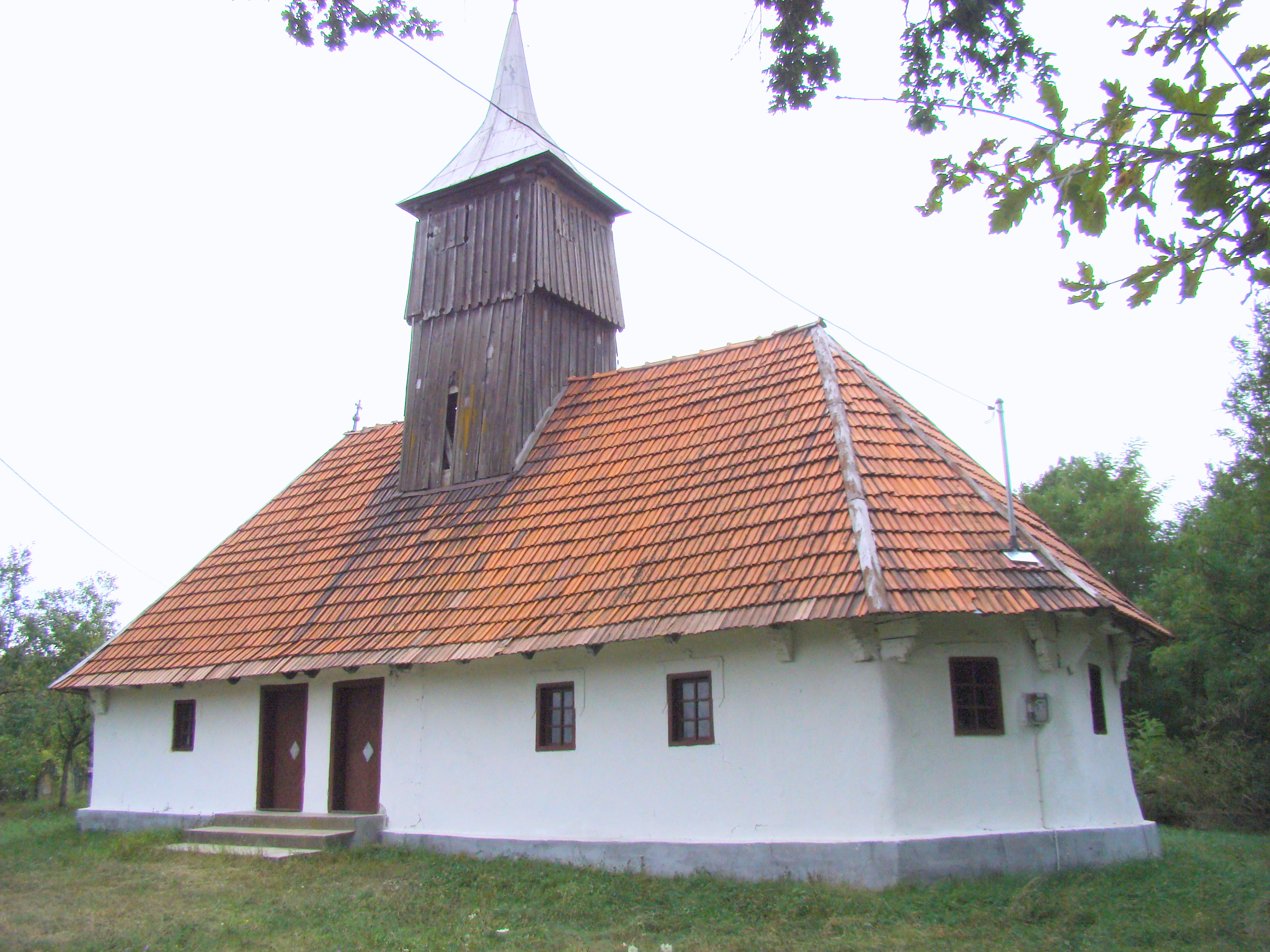
Wooden church in Bacea

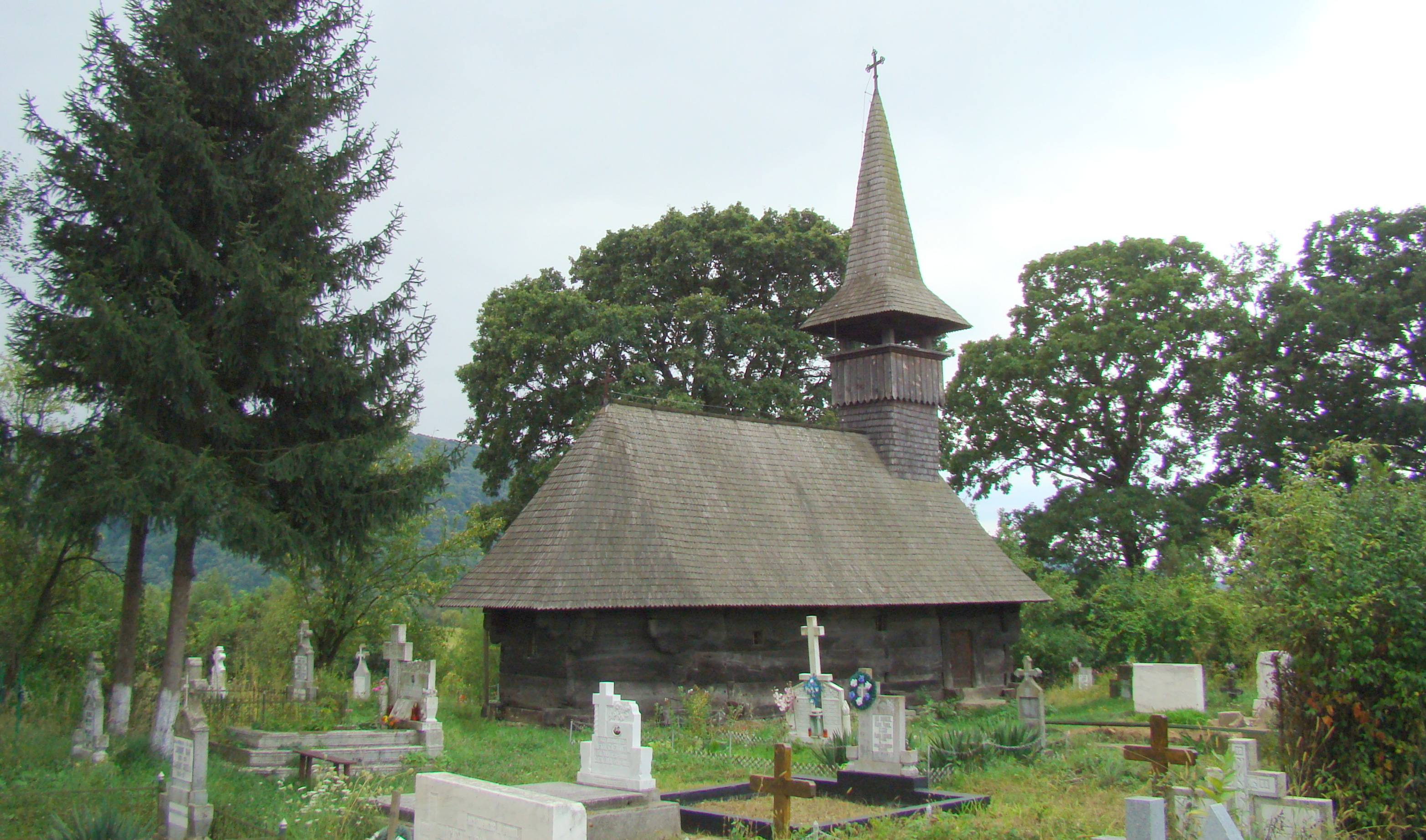
Saint Demetrius' wooden church in Bretea Mureșană

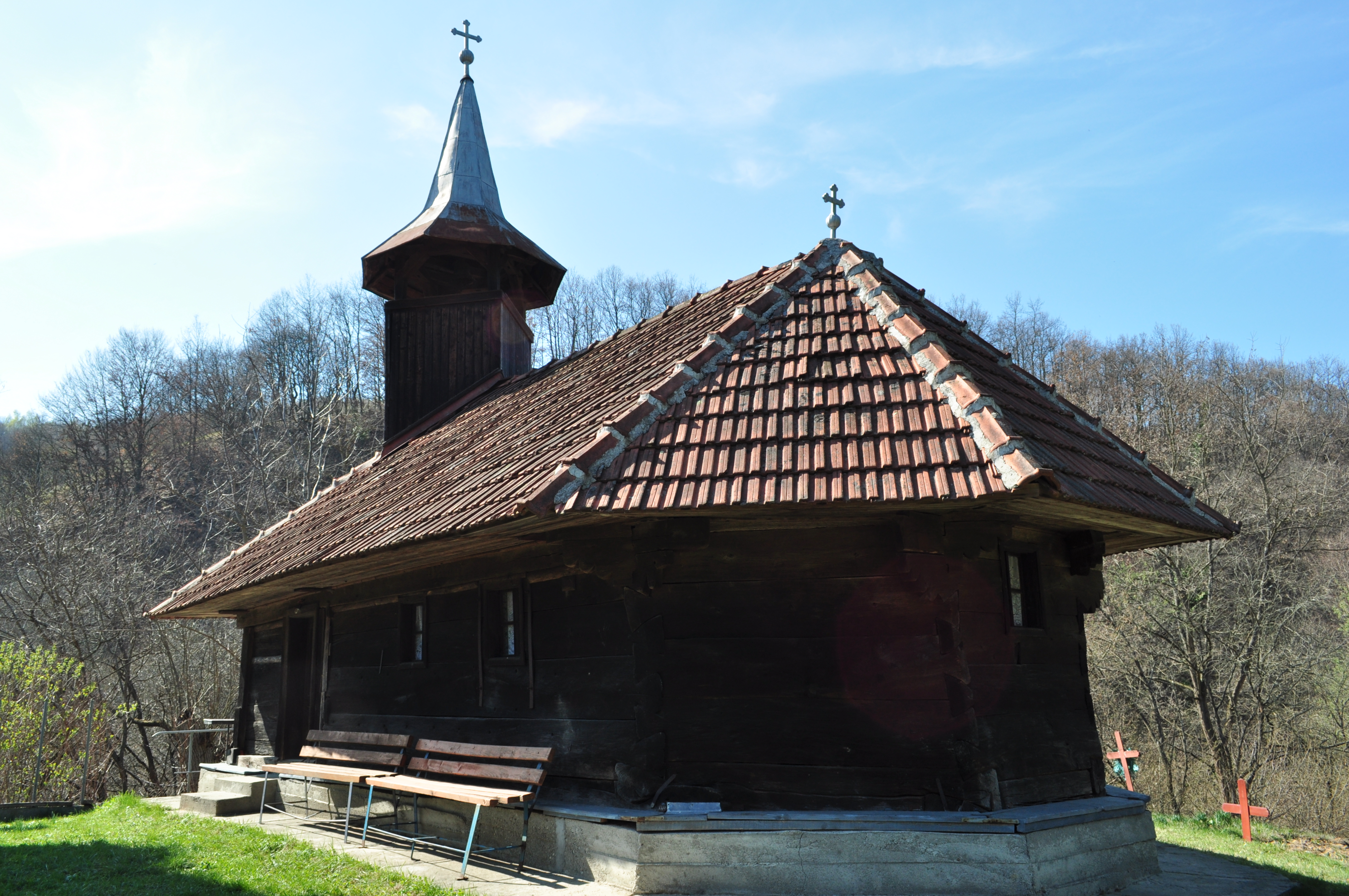
Saint Paraskeva's wooden church in Brâznic

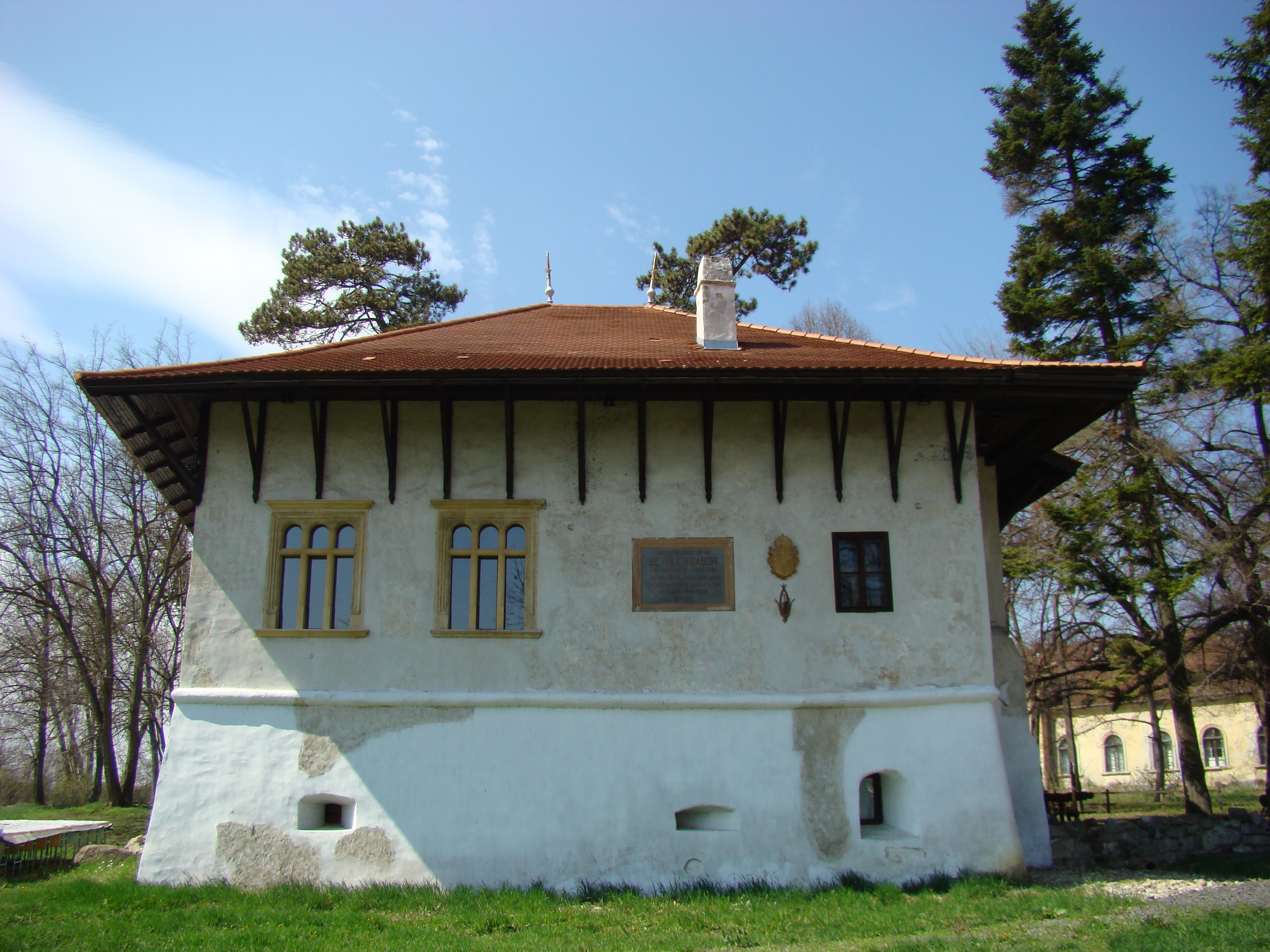
"Red Bastion" in Ilia, the Renaissance-style mansion built by Stephen Báthory in which Gabriel Bethlen was born in 1580

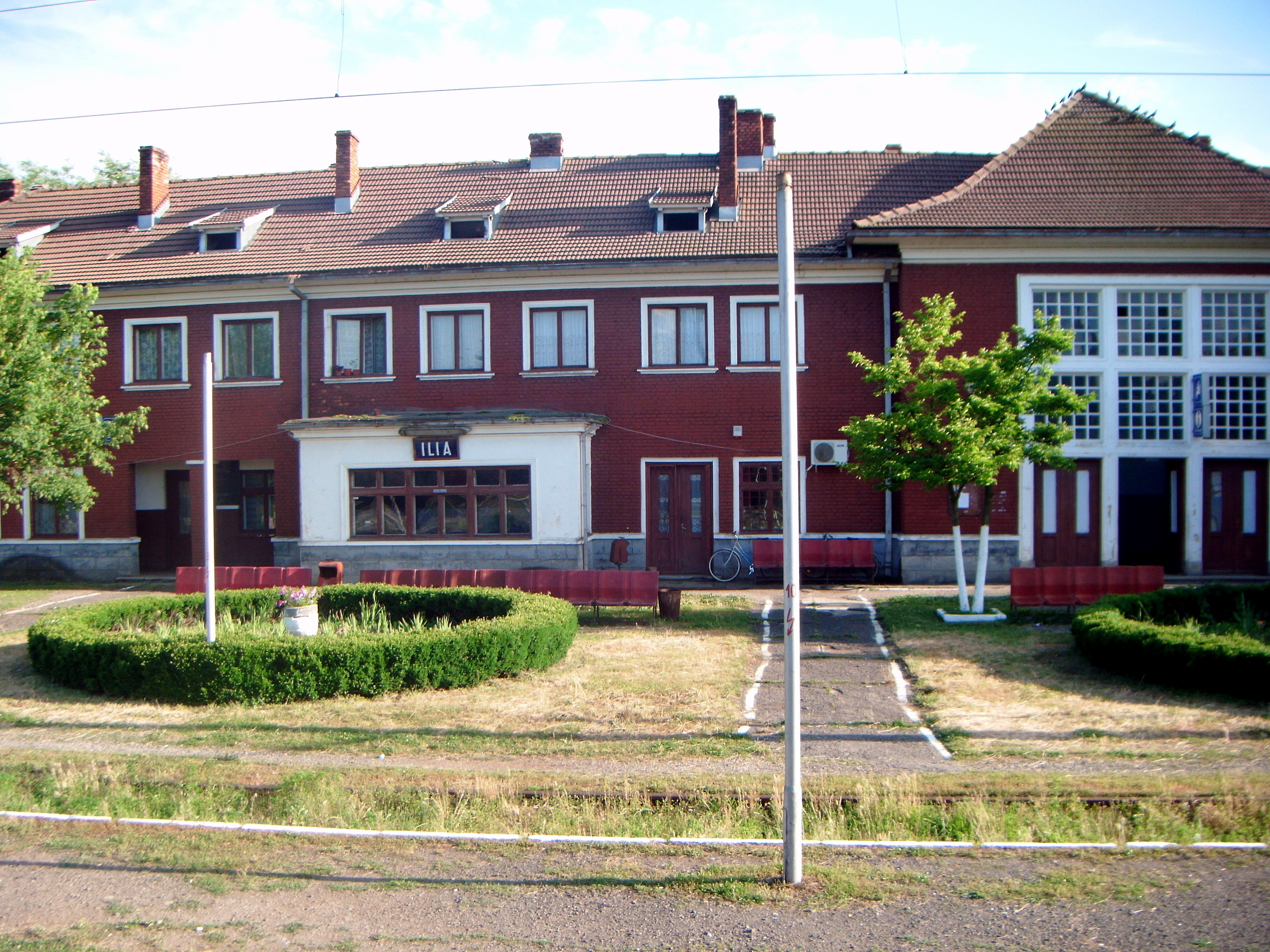
Ilia train station

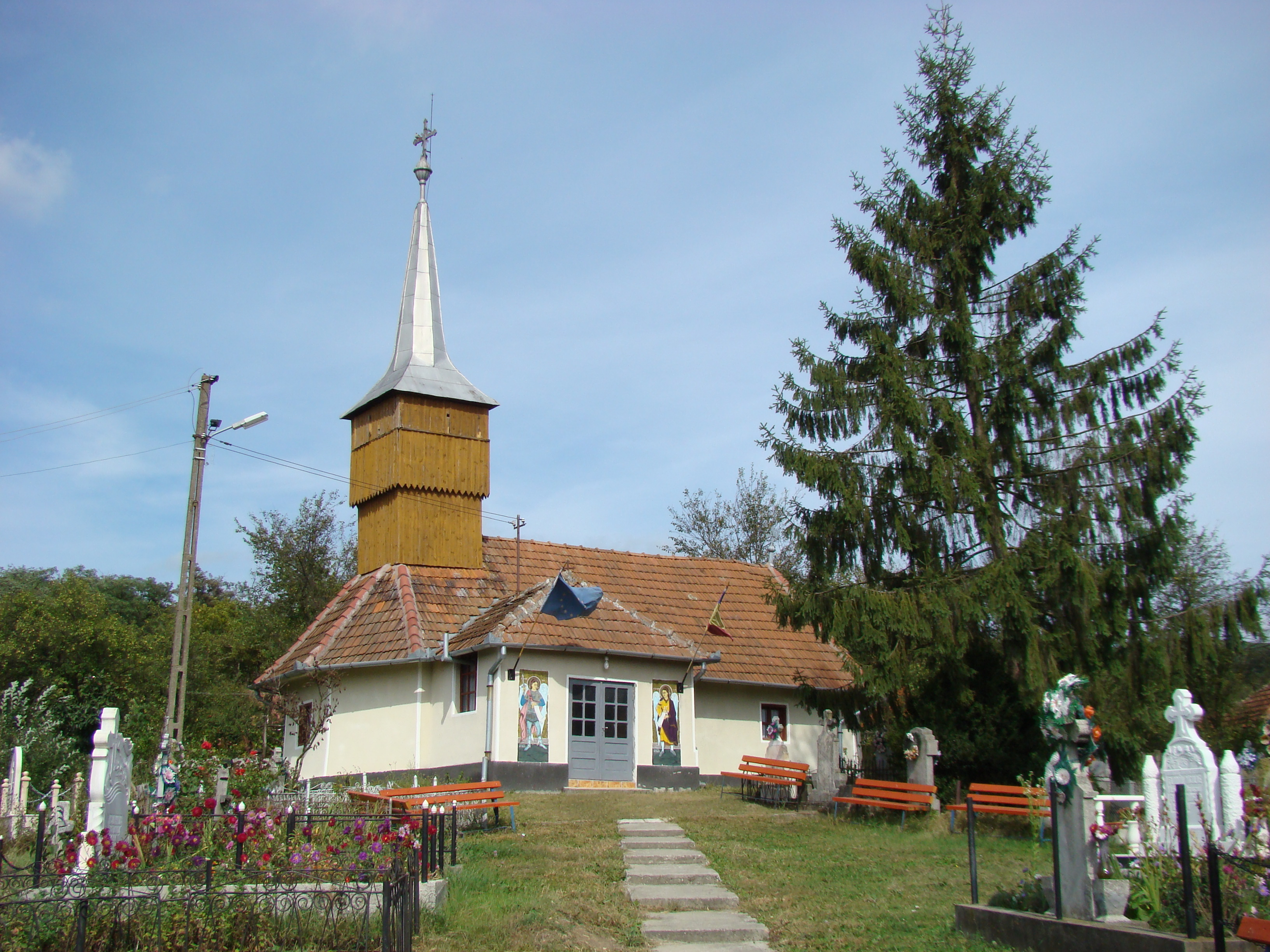
Wooden church in Sârbi

== See also ==
- Dacian fortress of Bretea Mureșană
