= List of Satu Mare districts =

Administrative Palace

The city of Satu Mare is divided into 12 districts:

- 14 Mai
- Carpați I
- Carpați II
- Centru Nou
- Cloșca
- Crișan
- Micro 17
- Horea
- Menumorut
- Sătmărel
- Soarelui
- Solidarității

== Sources ==
- "Destination: Romania / Satu Mare County – a brief history". Tribune Content Agency. 29 September 2014. ProQuest 1566090388.
- "Destination: Romania / Satu Mare County: the City of Satu Mare". Tribune Content Agency. 29 September 2014. ProQuest 1566090195.
- "Flash Lighting Services secures contract for Extension of public lighting in the parking lots in Micro 17, Carpathian and Carpathian II in Satu Mare municipality". Pivotal Sources. New Delhi: Disco Digital Media, Inc. 15 July 2022. ProQuest 2689932517.
- Smical, Irina; MiclăuȘ, Ioan (2025). "Monitoring of street noise pollution in the "14 Mai" residential neighborhood in Satu-Mare City, Satu-Mare County, Romania". Scientific Bulletin Series D: Mining, Mineral Processing, Non-Ferrous Metallurgy, Geology and Environmental Engineering. 39 (2): 31–40. doi:10.37193/SBSD.2025.2.04. ISSN 1582-0548. ProQuest 3343750420.
- Tátrai, Patrik (2011). "Ethnic residential segregation in three cities of Northwest Romania". Hungarian Geographical Bulletin. 60 (2): 189–216. eISSN 2064-5147. ISSN 2064-5031. ProQuest 2518824266.
