= Carpați =

Carpați may refer to:

- Carpathian Mountains from Romania
- Two residential districts in Satu Mare County, Romania:
  - Carpați I
  - Carpați II
- A gun
  - Pistol Carpați Md. 1974
- A cigarette brand
  - Carpați (cigarette)
- Trucks
  - SR-131 Carpați & SR-132 Carpați

== See also ==
- Karpaty
