= List of natives and inhabitants of Satu Mare =

List of natives and inhabitants of Satu Mare:

== B ==
- Antal Bánhidi (1903 – 1994), aviator
- László Bánhidi (1906 – 1984), actor
- János Barna (Budapest, November 15, 1880 – November 14, 1934, Budapest), translator, poet

== C ==
- Corneliu Chisu (born February 13, 1949), Romanian-Canadian politician

== D ==
- Gábor Darvas (1911–1985), composer
- Daniel David (born 23 November 1972), psychologist and academic
- András Domahidy (born February 23, 1920), novelist, living in Australia since 1950
- Jenő Dsida (May 17, 1907 – Cluj, June 7, 1938), poet, translator

== F ==
- Mircea Florian (born December 5, 1949), musician
- Miriam Fried (born September 9, 1946), Israeli classical violinist and pedagogue

== G ==
- Ernie Grunfeld (born 1955), American basketball player and executive

== H ==
- Ferenc Hoffmann (Stahlavy, January 6, 1873 – Budapest July 28, 1945), composer.

== I ==
- Iuliu Ilyés (born April 25, 1957), engineer and politician

== K ==
- Ernest Klein (July 26, 1899 – Ottawa February 4, 1983), linguist, author, and rabbi
- Victor Kord (born 1935), American painter and educator
- József Kürthy (July 14, 1881 – June 18, 1939), actor

== L ==
- Zsolt Láng (born October 17, 1958), politician
- Gyula Lengyel (1888–1941), politician

== M ==
- Simona Miculescu (born 4 July 1959), diplomat

== N ==
- Vince Nagy (March 4, 1886 – New York City, June 1, 1965), lawyer, politician, Minister of Internal Affairs during the First Hungarian Republic
- György Nyisztor (22 December 1869 – Budapest, 7 January 1956), politician, People's Commissar of Agriculture during the Hungarian Soviet Republic

== P ==
- Ioan Mircea Pașcu (born 17 February 1949), politician and Member of the European Parliament

== R ==
- Aharon Roth (Uzhhorod, 1894 − Jerusalem, 1947), Hasidic rabbi, founder of the Shomrei Emunim and Toldot Aharon Hasidic sects

== S ==
- Ovidiu Ioan Silaghi (born December 12, 1962), politician
- Sergiu Suciu (born 8 May 1990), footballer
- András Szántó (born May 25, 1946), graphician

== T ==
- Joel Teitelbaum (Sighet, Hungary (now Romania), January 18, 1887 − Kiryas Joel, USA, August 19, 1979): Hasidic rabbi, founder of the Satmar Hasidic sect

== W ==
- Peter Wertheimer (July 21, 1947 – January 5, 2020), musician
- Moshe Dovid Winternitz (1855–1944), Head of the Beth din Rabbinical Court in Satu Mare
