= Soarelui =

Soarelui may refer to one of two neighborhoods in Romania:

- Soarelui, Satu Mare
- Soarelui, Timișoara
