= Casco Schützhelme =

Casco Schutzhelme
- Type: Private
- Industry: protective gears
- Founded: 1989
- Headquarters: Bretnig-Hauswalde, Germany
- Products: helmets and goggles
- Revenue: €20 million (2008)
- Number of employees: 150 (2008)
- Website: www.casco-helme.de

Casco Schutzhelme, based in Bretnig-Hauswalde, Germany, is a protection headwear producing company from Germany which has one production-center in Satu Mare, Romania and a distribution-centre in Bretnig-Hauswalde. The Company is specialised in producing helmets and safety glassess. Amongst famous people who used the company's protective gear are Ole Einar Bjørndalen, Lars Bystøl, Jos Lansink and Jens Fiedler.
