= Winternitz =

Winternitz is a surname of Jewish origin. Notable people with the surname include:

- Adolfo Winternitz (1906–1993), Austrian-Peruvian Jewish painter
- Emanuel Winternitz (1898–1983) Austrian-American curator
- Jill Winternitz (born 1986/1987), American actress
- Moriz Winternitz (1863–1937), Austrian Jewish indologist
- Moshe Dovid Winternitz (1855–1944), Hungarian rabbi
- Pavel Winternitz (born 1936), Czech-Canadian mathematical physicist
- Roland Winters, born Roland Winternitz (1904–1989), American actor
- Wilhelm Winternitz (1834–1917), Austrian balneologist
