= Transurban S.A. =

- Company type: Public company
- Industry: Transport
- Founded: 2006
- Headquarters: Satu Mare, Romania
- Number of employees: 182 (2013)
- Website: transurbansatumare.ro

Transurban S.A. is the local public transport company of Satu Mare, Romania. The company runs an extensive 354.8 kilometres (220.5 mi) public transport network serving mainly the city but also two other communes Doba and Vetiș and the Sătmărel district. The company operates a fleet of 46 buses on 16 urban and 2 suburban lines. The bus fleet includes a number of 15 Irisbus Citelis manufactured by the French company Irisbus at its local production site located in Arad.
