= Karpati =

Karpati may refer to:

- Carpathian Mountains from Serbia
- Kárpáti, a Hungarian surname

== See also ==
- Karpaty (disambiguation)
- Karpathos
