= Reinisch =

Reinisch is a German surname. Notable people with the surname include:

- Leo Reinisch (1832–1919), Austrian linguist and Egyptologist
- Franz Reinisch (1903–1942), Austrian Roman Catholic priest
- June Reinisch (born 1943), American psychologist
- Rica Reinisch (born 1965), East German swimmer

== See also ==
- Reinitz
