= Informația Zilei =

Informaţia Zilei
- Type: Daily newspaper
- Format: Compact
- Owner(s): Solpress
- Founded: 1993
- Headquarters: Mircea cel Bătrân str., Nr. 15, Satu Mare
- Circulation: 13.920
- Website: informatia-zilei.ro

Informaţia Zilei (Daily Info) is a Romanian daily newspaper, issued by the Solpress company and focusing mainly on politics, public affairs, sports and economy. The first edition was printed in 1993.
