= Reinitz =

Reinitz is a surname of Ashkenazic and German origin, meaning either "queen", "counsel" or "lustful". Notable people with the surname include:

- Jacob Reinitz (1879–1934), Hungarian-born Jewish smuggler and murderer
- Maximilian Reinitz (1872–1935), Austrian painter

== See also ==
- Janet Braun-Reinitz (1938–2023), American muralist, painter and social activist
