= Satu Mare Chain Church =

Church in Satu Mare, Romania

Coordinates: 47°47′43″N 22°52′31″E

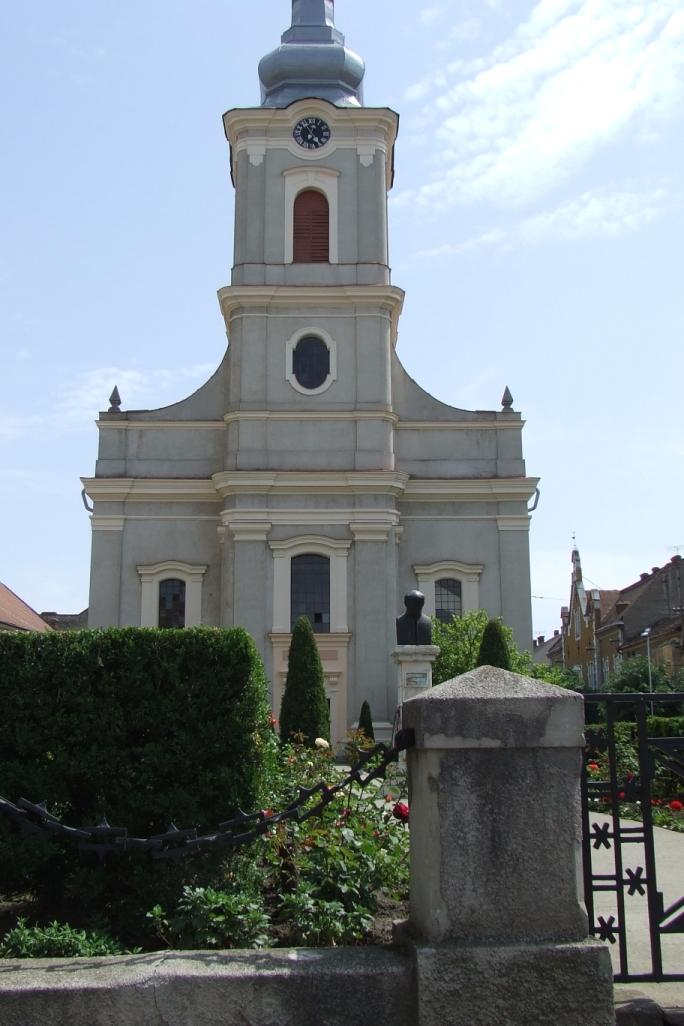
- Interactive map of the Satu Mare Chain Church area

General information
- Location: Satu Mare, Romania
- Construction started: 1793
- Completed: 1802

Design and construction
- Architect: Preinlich Sigismund

The Chains Church (Romanian: Biserica cu lanțuri; Hungarian: Láncos-templom), a Reformed church in Satu Mare, Romania, is one of the oldest churches in the city.

Located on Păcii Square, it was built based on the plans of Preinlich Sigismund, an engineer, between 1793 and 1802. The church has a valuable collection of plates, disks and glasses dating from 1657 to 1679, as well as the oldest bell in Satu Mare, dating to 1633. The church is surrounded by pillars connected by forged chains, hence the name The Chains Church.

The furniture inside the church was made between 1799 and 1807, from oak, by a master craftsman named Frits Iosif.
