= Firemen's Tower (Satu Mare) =

Building in Satu Mare, Romania

Turnul Pompierilor
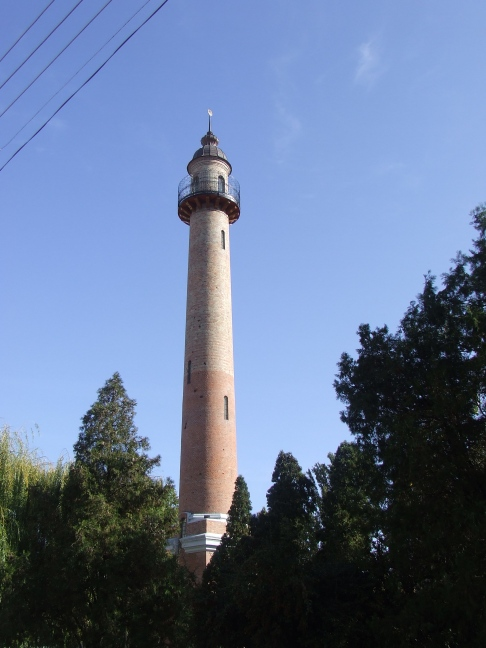
- Interactive map of the Turnul Pompierilor area

General information
- Status: Completed
- Location: Satu Mare, Romania
- Coordinates: 47.794373°N 22.87587°E
- Opening: 1904

Height
- Roof: 47 m (154 ft)

Firemen's Tower (Romanian: Turnul Pompierilor, Hungarian: Tűzoltótorony) is a 47 m high tower in Satu Mare, Romania built in 1904 at the recommendation of bishop Gyula Meszlényi. The architect of the tower was Ferencz Dittler and the builder Lajos Vajnay.

The tower was used, because of its height, as a fire spotter by the firemen. Today, the tower is a tourist attraction visited by around 100 visitors per day.
