= Karpaty =

Karpaty may refer to:

- the Carpathian Mountains
- FC Karpaty (disambiguation)
- SKA Karpaty Lviv
- Settled places:
  - Karpaty, Zakarpattia Oblast, Ukraine
  - Karpaty, Luhansk Oblast, Ukraine
  - Karpaty, Ulyanovsk Oblast, Russia
  - Karpaty, Kuyavian-Pomeranian Voivodeship, Poland

== See also ==
- Karpati (disambiguation)
- Karpathos
- Montes Carpatus
