= Satu Mare Synagogue =

Neolog synagogue in Satu Mare, Romania

- Romanian: Templul Mare din Satu Mare
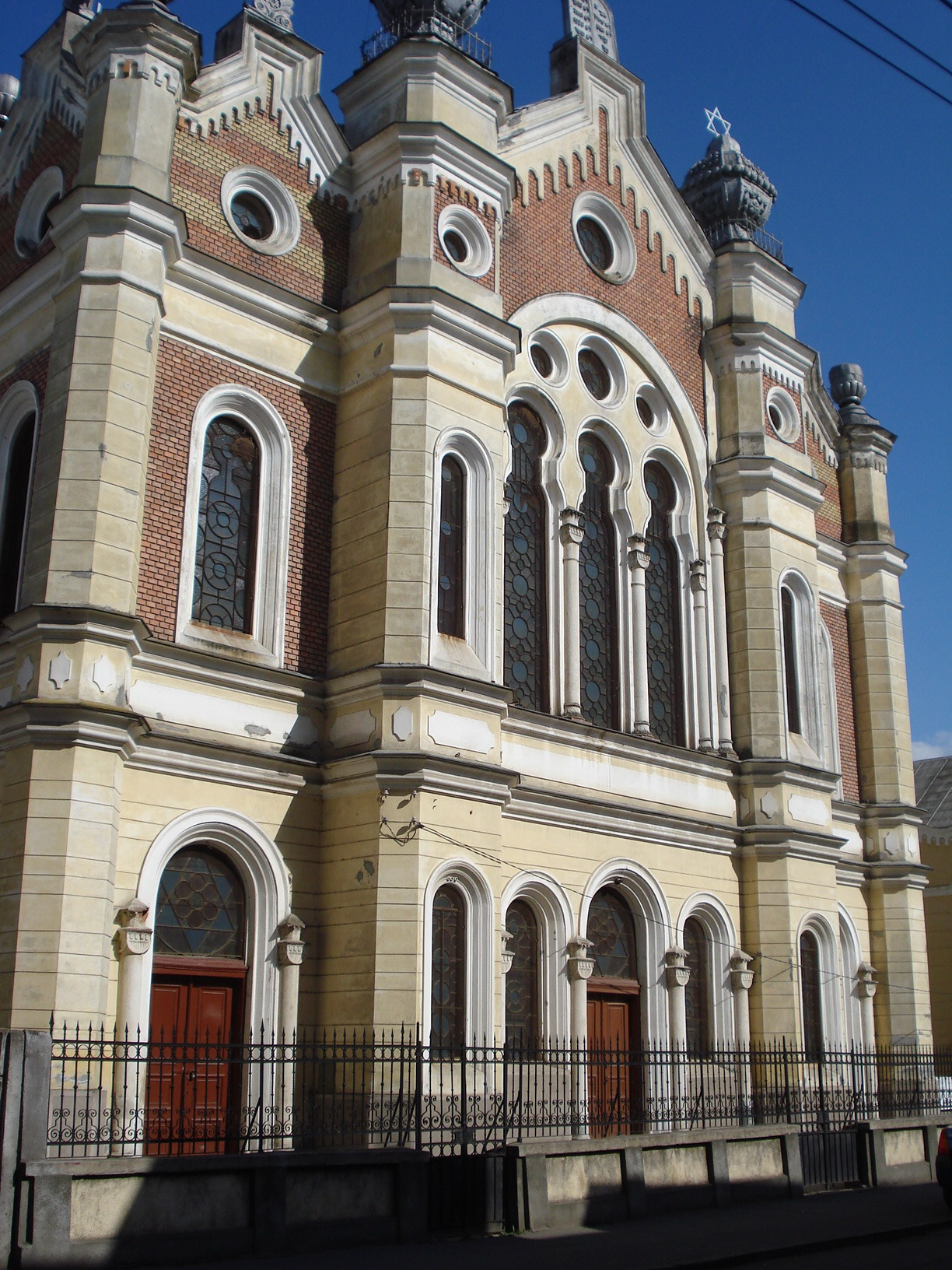
- The synagogue façade, in 2007

- Location of the synagogue in Satu Mare

Religion
- Affiliation: Neolog Judaism
- Rite: Nusach Ashkenaz
- Ecclesiastical or organizational status: Synagogue
- Status: Active

Location
- Location: 4 Decebal Street, Satu Mare, Transylvania
- Country: Romania
- Interactive map of Satu Mare Synagogue
- Coordinates: 47°47′27″N 22°52′28″E

Architecture
- Type: Synagogue architecture
- Style: Moorish Revival
- Completed: 1870
- Materials: Brick

Monument istoric
- Official name: Satu Mare: Ansamblul sinagogii / Sinagogă
- Type: Monumente de arhitectură
- Reference no.: SM-II-a-B-05207 / .01

The Satu Mare Synagogue (Romanian: Templul Mare din Satu Mare), also known as the Decebal Street Synagogue, is a Neolog Jewish congregation and synagogue, located at 4 Decebal Street, in Satu Mare, Transylvania, Romania.

The synagogue is included on the National Register of Historic Monuments in Romania.

Designed in the Moorish Revival style, the synagogue was completed in 1870. It has a tripartite façade, with the prayer house and the temple beside the facade. In 2004, a Holocaust memorial was dedicated in the synagogue's courtyard.

== See also ==
- History of the Jews in Romania
- List of synagogues in Romania
