= Dacia Hotel =

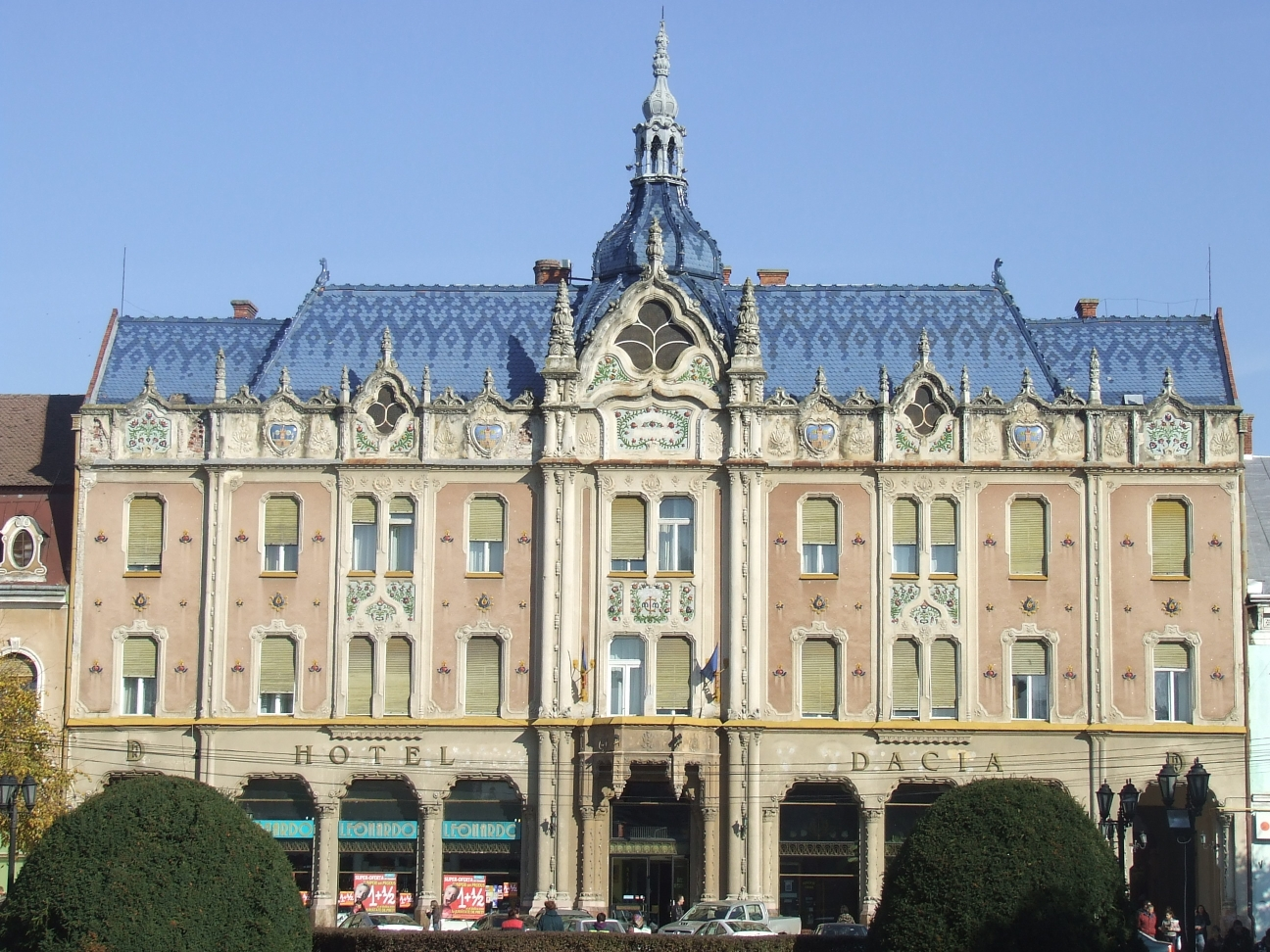
- Interactive map of the Dacia Hotel area

General information
- Status: Completed
- Location: Satu Mare, Romania
- Opening: 1902
- Owner: Tamás Leisztinger

Height
- Roof: 25 m (82 ft)

Technical details
- Floor count: 3

The former Dacia Hotel, originally Pannonia Hotel (in Hungarian: Pannónia Szálló) and future Indigo Hotel, is located in Satu Mare (in Hungarian: Szatmárnémeti), present-day Romania, at 8, Libertății Square. It was built at the beginning of the 20th century, on the site of the previous town hall. The façade is generously embellished with plant motifs made from enamelled ceramic.

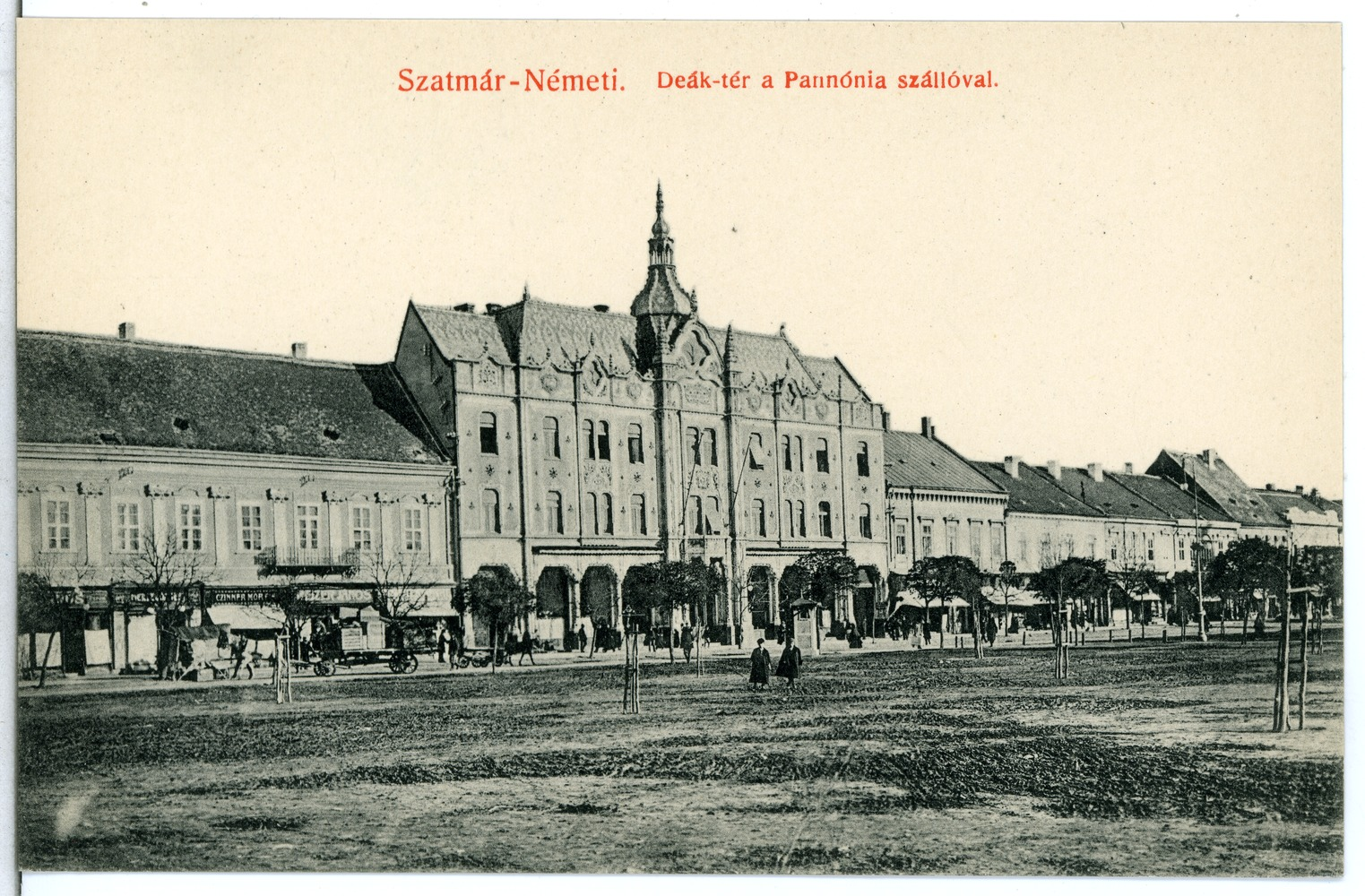
Pannonia Hotel at Deak Square (today Libertății Square) on a 1911 postcard

The building was completed in 1902 in Secession style (see Vienna Secession, related to Art Nouveau) with Indian influences, based on plans drawn by architects Zoltán Bálint (more here) and Lajos Frommer (more here), disciples of Hungary's primary Secession architect, Ödön Lechner. The Pannonia Hotel won a prize in 1903 in Vienna for its beauty.

== History ==
After the Union of Transylvania with Romania in the wake of World War I, the Hungary-related name of "Pannonia" was changed to the Romania-related "Dacia". Being the most beautiful hotel in the city, notables such as Liviu Rebreanu, Mihail Sadoveanu, Nicolae Iorga, and Octavian Goga stayed here.

The hotel was nationalised by Communist Romania after World War II.

In 1995, after the Romanian Revolution of 1989, the run-down Dacia Hotel was privatised. In 2007, it was bought by Romanian businessman Vasile Țânțaș for 1.7 million Euros. The 2008 financial crisis stopped the restoration project and the building was left to decay, which led to Țânțaș receiving a 6-month prison sentence, and in 2018 the property was purchased by Tamás Leisztinger, a Hungarian investor close to the Prime Minister of Hungary, Viktor Orbán. Leisztinger was planning to reopen the hotel under its original name, Pannonia. In 2020, the troubled building was indirectly acquired by the Hungarian Közép-európai Épített Örökség Megőrzési Alapítvány (KEÉÖMA; "Central European Built Heritage Preservation Foundation"), established by the Hungarian government and whose public purpose is of acquiring and preserving former Hungarian properties in the Carpathian Basin, an irredentist term used in Hungary to include territories lost after WWI, with the declared goal of "preserving Hungarian cultural heritage". In September 2023, a major renovation and modernisation project was started, promising to restore the dilapidated building in minute detail, including the colourful Zsolnay roof tiles. As of 2023, a reopening was envisaged for the year 2025 under the management of the Hungarian Hotel & More Group, as part of the international Hotel Indigo brand which is owned by InterContinental Hotels Group. Once inaugurated, it will be the first Indigo hotel in Romania. In 2025, while extensive restoration works are well advanced, they are predicted to be finished by the end of 2026. The future Indigo Hotel will boast 62 rooms and a spa.
