= Gazeta de Nord-Vest =

- Type: Daily newspaper
- Format: Compact
- Owner: Razvan Mircea Govor,
- Editor: Nord Vest TV Advertising
- Founded: 1990
- Headquarters: Petofi Sandor str., Nr. 4A, Satu Mare
- Website: gazetanord-vest.ro

Gazeta de Nord-Vest (North-West Gazette) is a Romanian daily newspaper focused mainly on politics, public affairs, sports and economy. The first edition was printed in 1990.
