= FC Karpaty =

FC Karpaty may refer to:

- FC Karpaty Lviv, Ukrainian football club
  - FC Karpaty-2 Lviv
  - FC Karpaty-3 Lviv
- FC Karpaty Halych, Ukrainian football club
- FC Karpaty Kolomyia, Ukrainian football club
- FC Karpaty Yaremche, Ukrainian football club
- FC Karpaty Mukacheve, Ukrainian football club
