= Carpați (cigarette) =

Discontinued Romanian cigarette brand

- An old Romanian pack of Carpați cigarettes, with a Romanian text warning at the bottom of the pack.
- Product type: Cigarette
- Produced by: Fabrica de Țigarete din Sfântu-Gheorghe (lit. 'Sfântu-Gheorghe Tobacco Factory'), a division of Galaxy Tobacco
- Country: Kingdom of Romania
- Introduced: 1931; 95 years ago
- Discontinued: March 2010; 16 years ago
- Markets: Kingdom of Romania, Socialist Republic of Romania, Romania

Carpați was a Romanian brand of cigarettes. It was owned manufactured by the Sfântu-Gheorghe Tobacco Factory, a subsidiary of Galaxy Tobacco. The brand is named after the Carpathian Mountains spanning Central and Eastern Europe.

== History ==
Carpați was launched in 1931 in the Kingdom of Romania, but production expanded significantly after the 1950s under the Communist regime, when this brand was produced in 6 factories (Timișoara, Sfântu Gheorghe, Târgu Jiu, Râmnicu Sărat, Iași and Bucharest). Each factory produced the cigarette with significant individual variations of the original recipe, giving birth to different preferences of Carpați smokers towards the producing factory. Throughout its production history, both filtered and unfiltered, king-size (85 mm) and short (70 mm) cigarettes were available under this brand, in either a soft or hard package, typically 20 cigarettes per pack. Furthermore, between 1950 and 1990, Carpați cigarettes were also available loose, typically sold by the dozen, in specialty tobacco stores. Only full strength cigarettes were ever produced, and the most popular model (and the only one produced until 2010) was the unfiltered, 70 mm variant in a soft, paper pack. Up until they discontinued the brand in 2010, only a few thousands packs are produced each year, and mainly sold as a nostalgia item. It was one of the cheapest cigarettes available on the market, becoming a favorite amongst students, factory workers and in the military, at one point in the 1970s accounting for more than 60% of the total sales in Romania.

However, ever since the introduction of foreign brands after the Romanian Revolution and subsequent privatization of the factory, market share of Carpați cigarettes dropped to a mere 10%, and they were only sold on the internal market in Romania.

The production of this brand was discontinued in March 2010, and the Sfântu-Gheorghe Tobacco Factory closed its doors on 21 December 2010, after 113 years of cigarette production.
