= Solidarității =

Solidarităţii is a residential district of Satu Mare in Romania.
