= András Domahidy =

Hungarian-Australian novelist

- Born: 23 February 1920; Satu Mare, Kingdom of Romania
- Died: 8 August 2012 (aged 92); Perth, Australia
- Citizenship: Hungarian-Australian
- Education: Budapest University (PhD)
- Writing career
- Notable works: Indian Summer (1969), Shadows and Women (1979)

András Kálmán Viktor Domahidy (23 February 1920 – 8 August 2012) was a contemporary Hungarian-Australian, novelist and librarian. His novels were written in Hungarian.

Born in Satu Mare, in northwestern Romania, András Domahidy completed a PhD in law at Budapest University and served in the Royal Hungarian Army towards the close of World War II. In 1950 he emigrated to Australia, settling in Perth and obtaining a BA at the University of Western Australia. Until his retirement in 1985 he was a senior librarian at the university.

Domahidy started writing in the 1950s and his novels Vénasszonyok nyara (Indian Summer, 1969) and Árnyak és asszonyok (Shadows and Women, 1979) were published in Europe. Shadows and Women has since been published in English translation in Australia.

== Bibliography ==
Novels

- Vénasszonyok nyara [Indian Summer] (Rome, 1969; Budapest, 1987)
- Árnyak és asszonyok (Bern, 1979; Budapest, 1985) [Shadows and Women Translated by Elizabeth Windsor (Perth: Aeolian, 1989) ISBN 1-875306-00-5]
