= 14 Mai, Satu Mare =

Coordinates: 47.790281°N 22.894117°E

14 Mai is a residential district of Satu Mare in Romania. It is named after the date of the devastating floods that affected the city in 1970.
