= Carpați I =

Carpaţi I is a residential district of Satu Mare in Romania. It is named after the Carpathian Mountains. It is at the exit of Satu Mare, one of the districts built after 1970 flood. The project was designed by architects led by Rupprecht Karoly. School district Octavian Goga (it received the name in 1997, on its 25th anniversary) was built at the time, both residential buildings and school being designed on Street Postavaru nr.3.

Neighbour districts:

- North: Residential district Micro 17
- East: -
- South: Residential district Carpați II
- West: Unio complex
