= Gábor Darvas =

Hungarian musician

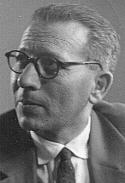
- Darvas in 1958
- Born: 18 January 1911; Szatmárnémeti (now Satu Mare), Austria-Hungary
- Died: 18 February 1985 (aged 74); Budapest, Hungary
- Occupation: Composer

Gábor Darvas (pronounced [ˈɡaːbor ˈdɒrvɒʃ]; until 1952 Gábor Steinberger; 18 January 1911 – 18 February 1985) was a Hungarian composer and musicologist. He was one of the first Hungarian composers to work in the field of electronic music. As a musicologist, his interest was primarily in music of the 15th and 16th centuries.

== Biography ==
He was born at Szatmárnémeti (Austria-Hungary) in 1911. His family moved to Budapest in 1918, where he finished his high school studies.

He studied piano from the age of nine, from 1926 until 1932 he attended the Academy of Music in Budapest as an instrumentalistsand later studied composition under Zoltán Kodály. His orchestral compositions of the thirties were performed in concerts and in the Hungarian Radio. In 1939 he left the country. During the World War II, he lived in Chile, working as a conductor and a musicologist. He was a direct assistant of Erich Kleiber, In 1948 he returned to Hungary, where he has continued his composer activity in 1951, commencing an active career as a composer, writing film scores as well as pieces using tape. He was musical expert of various cultural institutions until 1972. In addition to composing, he explored, orchestrated, published values of European music history, and wrote several musicological books.

He died in 1985 in Budapest.

== Compositions ==
- Improvisations symphoniques (1963) for piano and orchestra
- Sectio aurea (1964) for orchestra
- Medália (Medal) on a poem by Attila József (1965) for soprano, keyboard instruments, percussion and loudspeaker
- Rotation for 5 (1967) for vibraphone, marimba, guitarre, cimbalom and piano
- A torony (The tower) (1967) for voices and instruments
- Magánzárka (Solitary confinement) (1970) for percussion and tape
- Preludium (Prelude)(1970) for tape
- Passiózene (Passion music) (1974–78) for voices and tape
- Bánat (Grief) on a poem by Gábor Karinthy (1978) for baritone, orchestra and tape
- Reminiszcenciák (Reminiscences) (1979) for tape
- Poèmes électroniques (1982–83) for tape
- Fantázia (Phantasy) (1983) for piano and chamber ensemble
- Etudes symphoniques (1984) for orchestra

== Recording ==
- 1982 Gábor Darvas : Prelude - Medal - Solitary Confinement - Grief - Reminiscences – Hungaroton Classics SLPX 12365

== Books ==
- A szimfonikus zenekar (Zeneműkiadó Vállalat Budapest, 1958)
- A zenekari muzsika műhelytitkai (Zeneműkiadó Vállalat Budapest, 1960)
- Évezredek hangszerei (Zeneműkiadó Vállalat Budapest, 1961)
- Zenei ABC (Zeneműkiadó Vállalat Budapest, 1963)
- Bevezető a zene világába (1-5) (Zeneműkiadó Budapest, 1965)
- A zene anatómiája (Zeneműkiadó Budapest, 1974, 1975, 1985)
- Zenei minilexikon (Zeneműkiadó Budapest, 1974)
- A totem-zenétől a hegedűversenyig (Zeneműkiadó Budapest, 1977)
- Zenei zseblexikon (Zeneműkiadó Budapest, 1978, 1982, 1987)
- Zene Bachtól napjainkig (Zeneműkiadó Budapest, 1981)

== Awards ==
- Erkel Prize in 1955
