= Gotec Group =

- Company type: Private
- Industry: automotive
- Founded: 1978
- Headquarters: Wülfrath, Germany
- Products: automotive
- Revenue: €198 million (2007)
- Number of employees: 1,150 (2007)
- Website: www.gotec-group.com

Gotec Group based in Wülfrath, Germany, is an automotive corporation from Germany which has production and sales locations in 7 countries (Poland, Spain, Brazil, Turkey, United States, Germany and Romania).
