= Kárpáti =

Kárpáti is a surname of Hungarian origin. People with that name include:

- Béla Kárpáti (1929–2003) was a Hungarian football defender who played for Hungary in the 1954 and 1958 FIFA World Cups.
- Ferenc Kárpáti (1926–2013) was a Hungarian military officer and politician.
- Gábor Kárpáti (born 1978) is a Hungarian Triathlon
- György Kárpáti (born 1935) is a Hungarian former water polo player.
- János Kárpáti (1932–2020) was a Hungarian musicologist and librarian
- Károly Kárpáti (1906–1996) was a Jewish Hungarian Olympic wrestling champion.
- Levente Kárpáti (born 1961) is a Hungarian actor
- Ödön Kárpáti (1892–1918) was a Hungarian long-distance runner.
- Rebeka Kárpáti is a Hungarian titleholder who was crowned Miss Universe Hungary 2013.
- Rudolf Kárpáti (1920–1999) was a fencer from Hungary, who won six gold medals in sabre at four Olympic Games.
- Tamás Kárpáti (born 1949) is a Hungarian Postwar & Contemporary artist
