= Menumorut, Satu Mare =

Menumorut is a residential district of Satu Mare in Romania.
