= Bretnig-Hauswalde =

Former municipality in Saxony, Germany

- Ortsteil of Großröhrsdorf
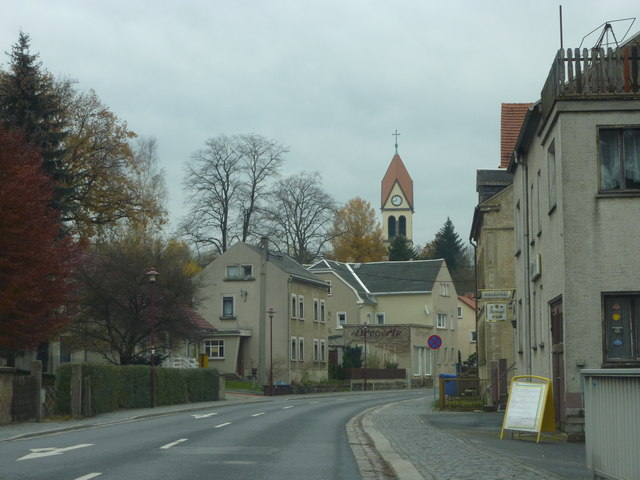

- Coat of arms
- Interactive map of Bretnig-Hauswalde
- Location within Germany Location within Saxony
- Coordinates: 51°9′N 14°5′E
- Country: Germany
- State: Saxony
- District: Bautzen
- Town: Großröhrsdorf
- Disbanded: 1 January 2017

Area
  - Total: 14.40 km^{2} (5.56 sq mi)

Population (2015-12-31)
  - Total: 2,914
  - Density: 202.4/km^{2} (524.1/sq mi)
- Time zone: UTC+01:00 (CET)
  - Summer (DST): UTC+02:00 (CEST)
- Postal codes: 01900
- Dialling codes: 035952
- Vehicle registration: BZ, BIW, HY, KM
- Website: www.bretnig-hauswalde.de

Bretnig-Hauswalde (German pronunciation: [ˈbʁɛtnɪç haʊsˈvaldə]) is a former municipality in the district of Bautzen, in Saxony, Germany. On 1 January 2017 Bretnig-Hauswalde was absorbed into Großröhrsdorf.
