= Centru Nou, Satu Mare =

Centru Nou (or Centrul Nou) (the New Centre) is a residential district of Satu Mare in Romania. It was built in the late 1970s and includes the Administrative Palace, one of the tallest buildings in Romania.

Centru Nou is the place where the administrative buildings are located, such as Local Council, County Council, and Town Hall in Administrative Palace.

Here takes place concerts of different kinds of music, festivals and in the night of the New Year, thousands of people gather here at night between 31 December - 1 January to celebrate together. Usually listening music, dancing, drinking, eating and watching the midnight fireworks. It hosts many types of shows, police exercise, fireman exercise, theatre and movies.

Centru Nou is mostly known for the banks in the area and stores. It also has many pubs, restaurants and fast-foods. It is an important economic part of the city.

== Casa de Cultura a Sindicatelor ==
Casa de Cultura a Sindicatelor is a building used for hosting inside shows, sometimes movies, XII school graduates and important political meetings.
