= Jacob Reinitz =

- יעקב רייניץ
- Born: September 11, 1879; Kántorjánosi, Austria-Hungary
- Died: March 19, 1934 (aged 54); Romania
- Cause of death: Hanging
- Known for: Murder of Jewish business partners
- Criminal charges: Murder
- Penalty: Hanging

Details
- Victims: Herman (Hersh) Gross; Shlomo Leibter; Jacob Leibovitch

Jacob Reinitz (September 11, 1879 – March 19, 1934) was a Jewish smuggler from Satu Mare who gained notoriety for murdering his Jewish business partners.

== Murders ==
Reinitz was a Chassidic Jew from Satu Mare who lured multiple business partners including his neighbor Herman Gross to the border with the promise of lucrative smuggling prospects along the Ukrainian-Czechoslovak border. At the border he would rob the victim of the monies brought purportedly for smuggling and murder them. Gross' wife reported the murder to the local police. She claimed that Reinitz came to their house one night and awakened her husband, urging him to come with him to the border with a large sum of cash. Reinitz claimed he had no idea what occurred to his partners. Upon searching Reinitz's attic they found some of Gross' belongings covered in blood. Gross' body was found in the forest, his head bludgeoned with a hammer. While imprisoned, Reinitz became the gabbay of the small synagogue in jail though his beard was shorn.

== Sentencing and death ==
Reinitz was sentenced to death by hanging. At the time of his sentencing he was the second Jew to be sentenced to death by hanging in the country.

== Informant ==
During World War I, Reinitz acted as an informant notifying authorities of Jewish deserters.
