= Administrative Palace, Satu Mare =

Building in Romania

Administrative Palace
- Palatul administrativ
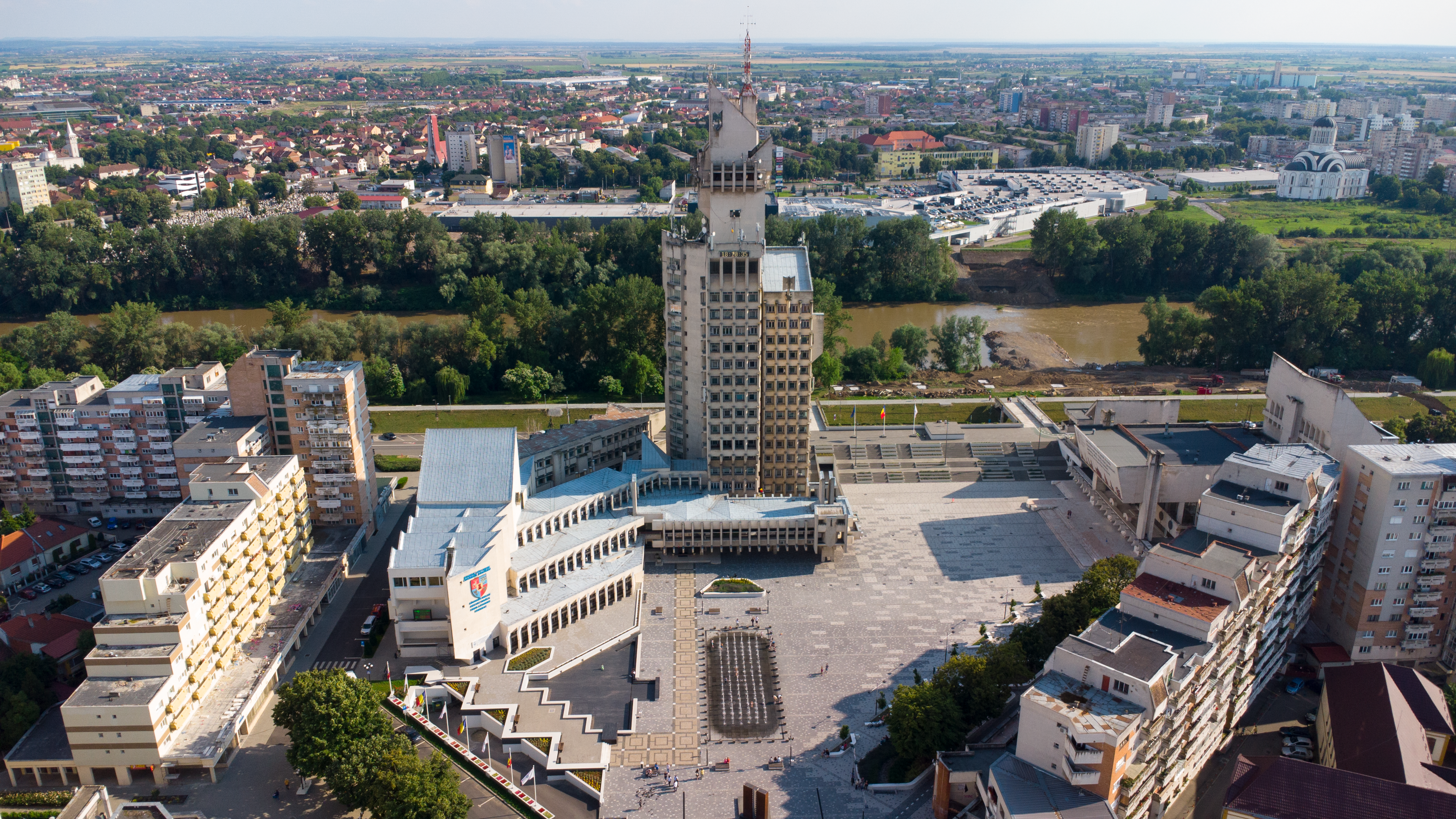
- The High-rise portion of the Administrative Palace
- Interactive map of the Administrative Palace area

General information
- Status: Completed
- Type: Office
- Location: Satu Mare, Romania
- Coordinates: 47°47′20″N 22°52′23″E
- Construction started: 1972
- Opening: 1984
- Owner: Satu Mare City Hall

Height
- Roof: 97 m (318 ft)

Technical details
- Floor count: 18
- Floor area: 12,000 m^{2} (130,000 sq ft)

Design and construction
- Architect: Nicolae Porumbescu

The Administrative Palace (Romanian: Palatul administrativ) is a building in Satu Mare, Romania. At 97 metres, it is the highest building in Transylvania and one of the highest in the country. It is an example of brutalist style architecture.

== Location ==
The building is located in the center of Satu Mare, on the south-eastern corner of October 25th Square. The structure is also immediately north of the Someș river which flows through the city, being only about 80 meters away from the water.

From the top of the building, almost the entire Satu Mare County is visible, as well as parts of Hungary.

== History ==
The history of the building starts in the 1960s, when Satu Mare experienced a period of infrastructure development under the communist regime. The Romanian Communist Party wanted to build a new city center with a building that would be a new landmark for the city. Thus, in 1972, construction of the building began, the main architect being Nicolae Porumbescu of Iaşi, assisted by Ludovic Gyüre of Satu Mare.

The building was completed in 1984; there were over 1,000 workers employed on the project.

The building has three smaller towers and one big main tower. The three small towers were meant to represent the three ethnic groups present in Satu Mare County: Romanians, Germans and Hungarians, while the main tower represented the bond between these three ethnic groups. However, later, with the communist government's growing focus on nationalistic sentiment, this symbolism of the building's design was gradually attenuated.

Today, the building houses several government institutions, including the county council, prefecture, city hall and culture office.

== See also ==
- Centru Nou, Satu Mare
- List of Brutalist structures
