= Dräxlmaier Group =

German automotive company

Dräxlmaier Group SE & Co. KG
- Type: SE & Co. KG
- Industry: Automotive supplier
- Founded: 1958
- Headquarters: Vilsbiburg, Germany
- Key people: Friedrich Dräxlmaier; Jan Reblin; Dr. Harald Straky; Arno Güllering; Torsten Kurz
- Revenue: EUR 5.0 billion euro (2025)
- Number of employees: 60,000 (2025)
- Website: www.draexlmaier.com

Dräxlmaier Group SE & Co. KG (stylized as: DRÄXLMAIER) is the parent company of the Dräxlmaier Group, a German automotive supplier headquartered in Vislbiburg, Lower Bavaria. Founded in 1958, the family-owned company develops and manufactures electrical and electronic components, wiring systems and interiors, as well as low- and high-voltage storage systems for motor vehicles. The company's customers include Audi, BMW, Cupra, Jaguar Land Rover, Maserati, Mercedes-Benz Group, Porsche, Volvo, Škoda, and Volkswagen as well as various American automotive manufacturers.

== History ==
=== 1958-1967 ===
In May 1958, Lisa and Fritz Dräxlmaier Sr. entered the growing automotive market. The production of 50,000 wiring harnesses for the Goggomobil manufactured by Glas in Dingolfing was the first order for the Lower Bavarian company. Shortly afterwards, the second product division was established: Dräxlmaier supplied the entire vehicle interior for the small car, which was built until 1969, including the instrument panel, door trim, seat covers and rear shelf.Due to the growth in orders, Dräxlmaier installed the first systems for welding door panels forming thermoplastic films for the production of instrument panels in 1960. As a result, the first company-owned factory hall was built in Vilsbiburg in 1964. BMW was acquired as a customer in 1966. The first order for BMW was to equip the 1600 GT.

=== 1968-1977 ===
The continuing increase in orders encouraged Dräxlmaier to expand its site in Vislbiburg in 1968. This led to the creation of its own mold-and-tool shop and the first computer system. In the same year, construction began on a new production and administration building. Audi and Volkswagen AG were supplied with products starting 1969 and 1971, respectively. International expansion began in 1974 with production in Tunisia. In the following years, further international locations were opened, including a production plant for wiring harnesses and interior components in Ontario, Canada (1976).

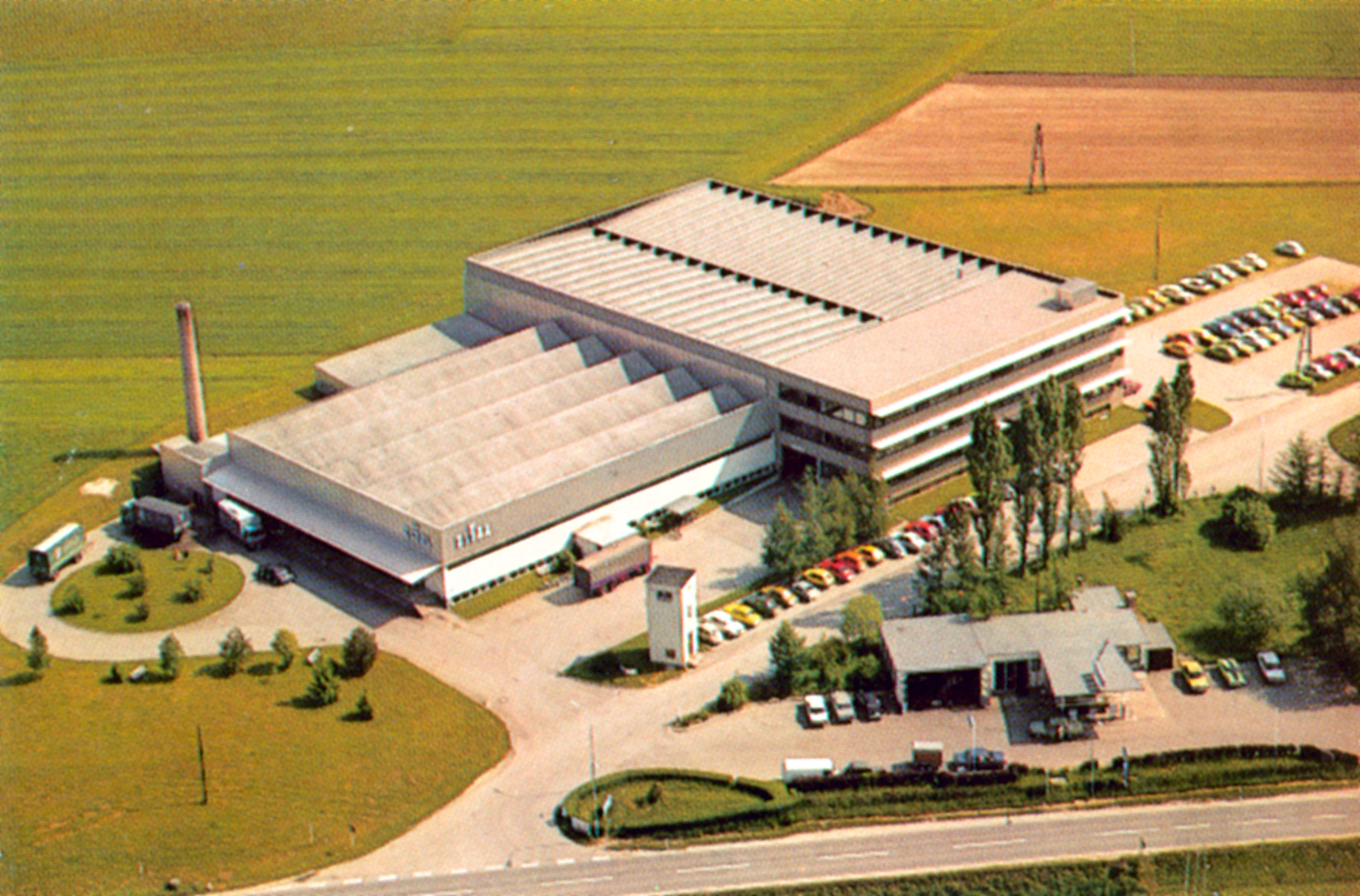
Production and administration building, Brückenstrasse, Vilsbiburg (1970)

=== 1978-1987 ===
The workforce grew to just under 2,000 employees during the 1980s. A production site was established in Braunau am Inn, Austria, (1978). In 1982, the company manufactured components for Daimler-Benz for the first time. In 1983, Dräxlmaier used a mainframe computer for the first time and converted 100 workstations to electronic data processing. The construction of the automated high-bay warehouse and the parts-picking warehouse in 1987 laid the foundation for supply chain management. Since then, the material flow and all essential JIT/JIS processes have been controlled from there.

=== 1988-1997 ===
In 1993, Dräxlmaier opened production sites in Czechia and Romania. With the contract to develop, manufacture and deliver the complete cockpit for the Mercedes-Benz CLK, the company took the step of becoming a system supplier in the interior segment in 1994. In 1996, the production network was expanded with new production sites in the USA and Mexico. The "Group of Companies Dräxlmaier " was renamed the "Dräxlmaier Group" in 1997. In November 1997, it purchased the subsidiary Holzindustrie Bruchsal GmbH from the then Daimler-Benz AG..

=== 1998-2007 ===
In 1998, the company moved into a new technology center in Vilsbiburg. In 1999, the Dräxlmaier Group became the first system supplier to produce a full leather interior for the Mercedes-Benz CL Coupé. This was followed in 2000 by the production of the entire interior for the BMW Z8. The company also developed and supplied the wiring harness for both models. In 2002, it developed, produced and supplied the complete wiring harness system and interior for the Maybach limousine. In addition to a second location in Landau an der Isar (Germany), a plant was established in Shenyang, China, in 2003. At the same time, Porsche and Jaguar Land Rover became part of the company´s customer base. Between 2005 and 2007, further locations were opened in South Africa (2005); Thailand, Spain and Mexico (2006); and Bălți in Moldova (2007).

=== 2008-2017 ===
In 2008, the Dräxlmaier Group introduced natural fiber composite material for vehicle interiors. The door trim developed for the BMW 7 Series consists of biocomposite material. With the production plant in Serbia, another location followed in 2008, initially employing 800 workers on three assembly lines. The company developed the interior and wiring system for the Porsche Panamera, which was launched in 2009. In 2011, Dräxlmaier developed the world´s first door trim with visible natural fiber. This was first installed in the BMW i3 in 2013. The company expanded its existing production facilities in Shenyang, China, in 2012. At the same time, the company built a full-scale production plant in Kavardaci, North Macedonia. In 2013 another location opened in Leipzig, Germany. In the same year, a new business area was developed with Dräxlmaier Aviation GmbH. Until 2017, the company developed and produced interiors for private and business aircraft.

In 2014, the company´s logistics network was expanded with the Zwickau location in Germany. Qestronic Advanced Technologies GmbH from Geisenhausen was integrated into the Dräxlmaier Group in 2015. The supplier opened a new production site for interior components in Langfang, China. A production site for interior components was opened in Livermore, California (USA).

=== 2018-present ===
In 2018, the Dräxlmaier Group entered into a research partnership with the Technical University of Munich in Garching. There, the company's developers work together with TUM professors on topics related to the automotive industry. The automotive supplier built its first highly automated battery production facility in Sachsenheim near Stuttgart.

On April 22, 2026, a partnership between Dräxlmaier and KNDS was announced. This partnership calls for Dräxlmaier to participate in the assembly of BOXER mission modules.

== Management ==
Management is the responsibility of the managing directors Jan Reblin (chairman), Dr. Harald Straky, Arno Güllering and Torsten Kurz. Friedrich Dräxlmaier is chairman of the board of directors.

== Business areas ==
As an automotive supplier, the Dräxlmaier Group manufactures wiring systems, central electrical and electronic components, interiors, and low- and high-voltage storage systems for electromobility.

- Interior systems: The Dräxlmaier Group manufactures instrument panels, center consoles and door panels for automobiles. It also produces door and cockpit modules that are adapted to the special equipment of the respective vehicle through system integration. In addition, the company manufactures RGB ambient lighting for vehicle interiors.
- Vehicle electrical systems: The product range includes all elements of the electrical system. The company is considered the inventor of the customer-specific wiring harness.
- E-mobility systems: Dräxlmaier develops and produces high- and low-voltage storage systems in the voltage range from 12
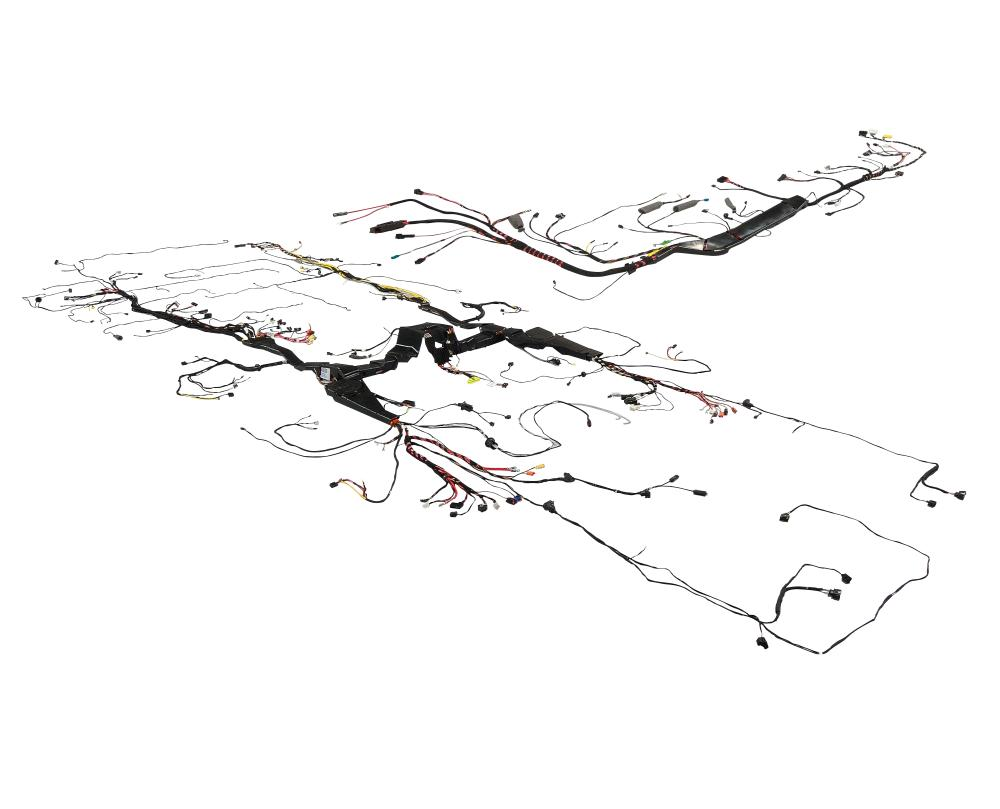
  A wiring tree developed by Dräxlmaier
  volts to 800 volts, as well as electrical and electronic HV components ranging from charging pins to cells. The company also manufactures high-voltage charging systems and battery wiring - either using rail technology or conventionally with aluminium round conductors. It operates several battery plants in Germany for the production of its high-voltage battery systems.

== Social commitment ==
Dräxlmaier is committed to supporting culture, sports, education, and social projects wherever the Group has locations. Supporting young talent and sustainability are at the heart of its social engagement. Educational projects include, among others, "Ferien in der Werkstatt", Vilsbiburg and a robotics lab at the University of Timișoara´s Hunedoara campus. In the cultural sphere, the company supports the Landshuter Kurzfilmfestival, the Spektakel Landshut, and an open-air cinema in Bălți. In sports, the Group is involved with the Rote Raben, EV Landshut, Baskets Vilsbiburg, and Spielvereinigung Landshut. Sustainability and environmental initiatives include World Cleanup Day in Duncan, the construction of check dams in Khao Yai Da, and a beautification project at the El Jem Amphitheater. Social projects include participation in Landshut läuft and support for an integration camp in San Luis Potosí.

== Awards ==
The company has received numerous awards as an employer. For example, in 2025, Dräxlmaier was certified as a "TOP Employer Germany" for the 17th consecutive year. In 2024, the subsidiary in China received the "TOP Employer China" award for the third consecutive year. In addition, Dräxlmaier Vietnam was recognized by HR Asia in the "Best Companies to Work for in Asia" category in both 2024 and 2026.

== Literature ==
Tobias Nickel: Dräxlmaier - We create character. E-Motion Verlag, Vilsbiburg 2019, ISBN 978-3-00-061732-4.
