= Sătmărel =

Neighbourhood in Satu Mare, Romania

Coordinates: 47°44′N 22°48′E

Sătmărel (Hungarian: Szatmárzsadány) is a residential district of Satu Mare in Romania. Legally a village administered by the city, it was a separate commune until the 1980s. It has a population of 1,136 Inhabitants
