= Soarelui, Satu Mare =

Romanian residential district

Soarelui is a residential district of Satu Mare in Romania.
