= Carpați II =

Carpaţi II is a residential district of Satu Mare in Romania. It is named after the Carpathian Mountains.

Neighbour districts:

- North: Residential district Carpati I
- East: -
- South: Exit of Satu Mare
- Vest: Unio complex
