= Moshe Dovid Winternitz =

Hungarian rabbi (1855–1944)

- Av Beth Din in Satu Mare
- Born: 1855; Szatmárnémeti, Kingdom of Hungary, Austrian Empire
- Died: 1944 (aged 88–89); Auschwitz-Birkenau, German-occupied Poland

Moshe Dovid Winternitz (1855–1944) was the Head of the Beth din Rabbinical Court in Satmar, Hungary (now Satu Mare, Romania). This position was second to the Rabbi of the city. He is considered to be one of the greatest scholars of his time. People from around the globe would send him Halachic queries.

In the summer of 1944, he was deported with many of the other Jews of Satmar to the Auschwitz Death camp, where he perished.
