= List of places in Satu Mare =

This is a list of the most important tourist sites in Satu Mare, Romania.

== Places of worship ==
- Chain Church
- SS. Michael and Gabriel
- Roman Catholic-Cathedral
- Kűltelki Reformed Church
- Greek-Catholic Cathedral
- Dormition of Virgin Mary Cathedral
- Orthodox Church
- Calvaria Roman Catholic Church
- Satu Mare Synagogue

== Historical buildings ==
- Firemen's Tower
- Dacia Hotel
- Astoria Hotel
- Episcopal Palace
- Railway Station
- County Library
- The North Theater
- County Museum
- Art Museum
- Creation Shop Paul Erdos
- Dinu Lipatti Phylharmonic
- Dana II Hotel
- Villa Bodi

== Statues and historical monuments ==
- Monument of the Romanian Soldier
- Capitoline Wolf Statue

== Bridges ==
- Decebal Bridge
- Golescu Bridge
- Iron Bridge
- Yellow Bridge

== Modern buildings ==
- Administrative Palace
- Aurora Hotel
- Traian Plaza
- Nisco City Center
- Coral Hotel
- Dana Hotel
- Dana Complex
- Select World Tower
