= Mihăileni, Harghita =

Mihăileni Csíkszentmihály
- Commune
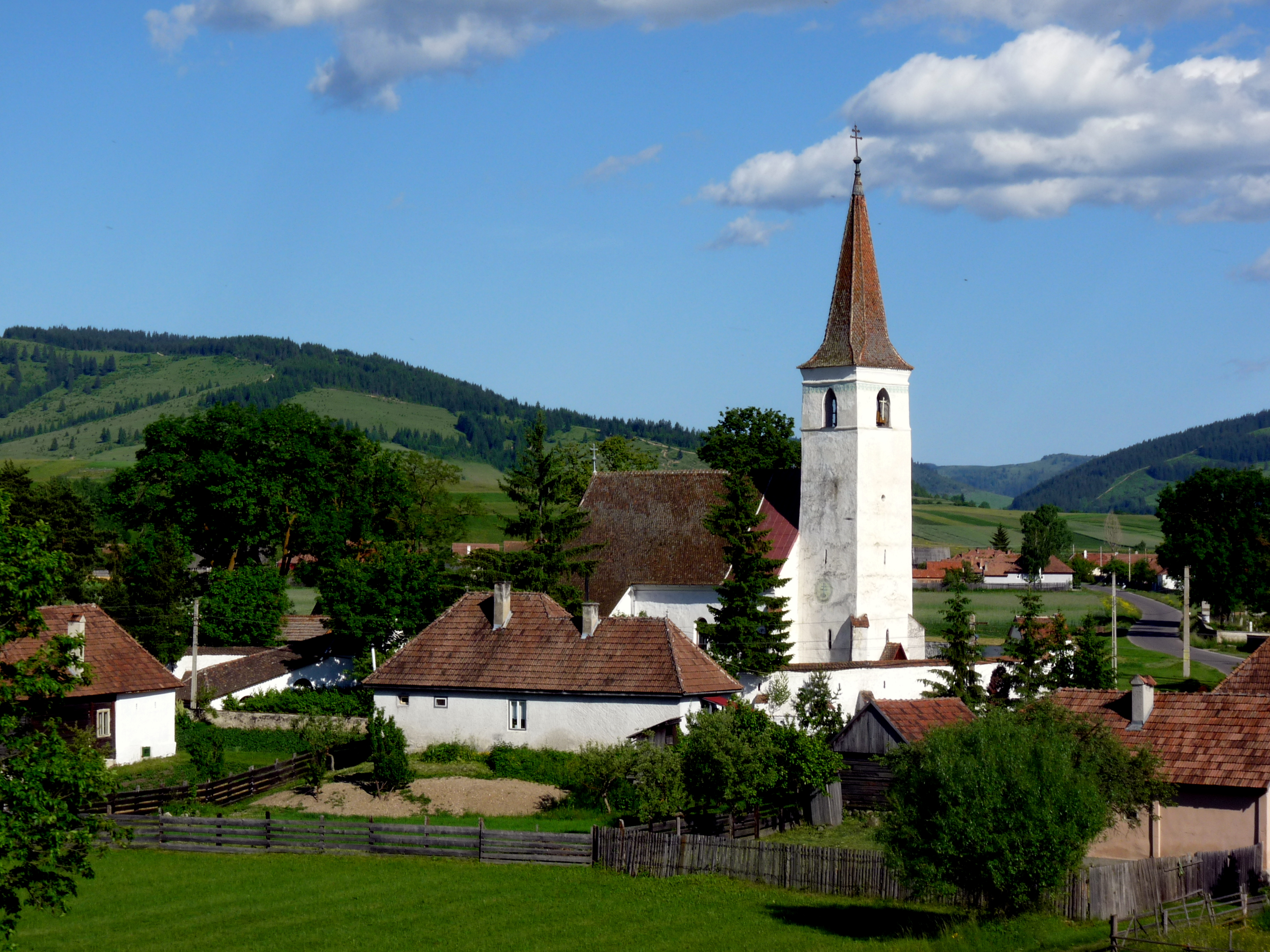
- Fortified church of Mihăileni

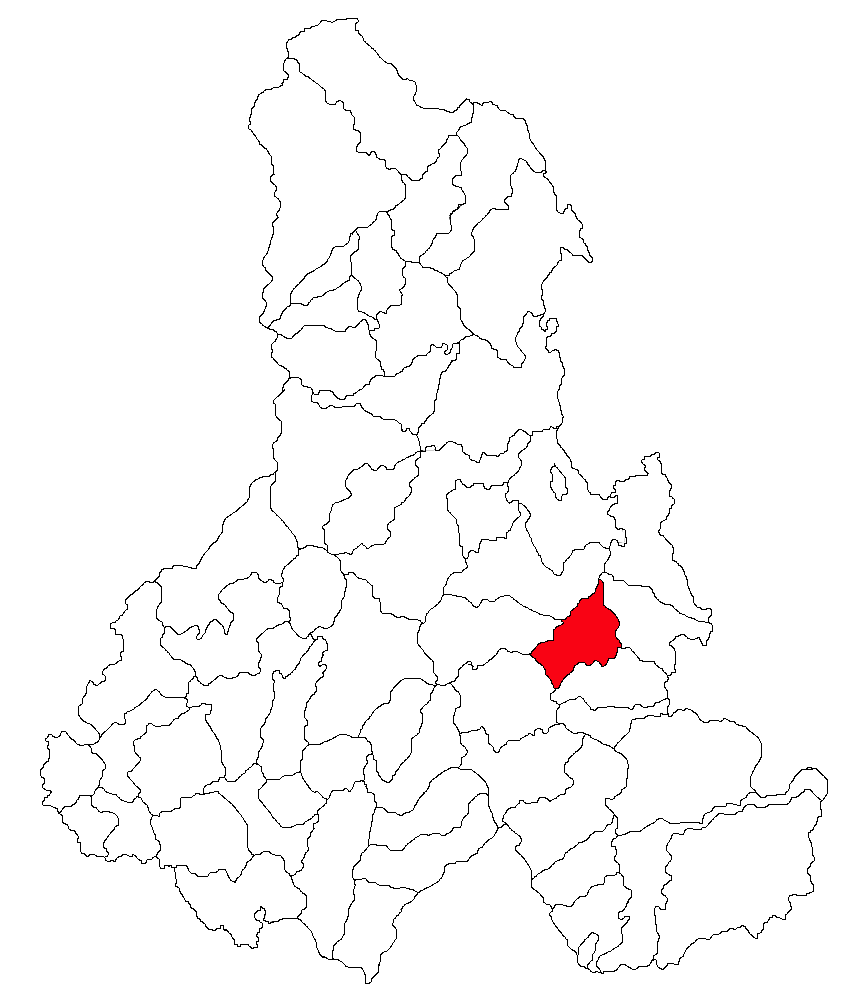
- Location in Harghita County

- Location in Romania
- Coordinates: 46°28′N 25°49′E
- Country: Romania
- County: Harghita

Government
  - Mayor (2020–2024): Lóránt Izsák-Székely (UDMR)
- Area: 83.64 km^{2} (32.29 sq mi)
- Elevation: 739 m (2,425 ft)
- Population (2021-12-01): 2,593
  - Density: 31.00/km^{2} (80.29/sq mi)
- Time zone: UTC+02:00 (EET)
  - Summer (DST): UTC+03:00 (EEST)
- Postal code: 537200
- Area code: +(40) 0266
- Vehicle reg.: HR
- Website: www.csikszentmihaly.ro

Mihăileni (Hungarian: Csíkszentmihály or colloquially Szentmihály, Hungarian pronunciation: [ˈtʃiːksɛnmihaːj], meaning "St. Michael of Csík") is a commune in Harghita County, Romania. The commune lies in the Székely Land, an ethno-cultural region in eastern Transylvania. It is composed of four villages: Livezi (Lóvész), Mihăileni, Nădejdea (Ajnád), and Văcărești (Vacsárcsi).

== Location ==
The commune is located in the east-central part of the county, 14 km (8.7 mi) north of the county seat, Miercurea Ciuc. The centre village is situated in Upper Ciuc, along the county road DJ124; this road branches off national road DN12A, which connects Miercurea Ciuc with Onești, Bacău County, crossing the Eastern Carpathians through the Ghimeș-Palanca Pass.

Mihăileni is situated in the foothills of the Ciuc Mountains, at an altitude of 739 m (2,425 ft), on the banks of the river Racul. The settlement was formed at the meeting point of this river and the Csorgó Stream springing from the Kőd Mountain. The Kőd Peak (845 m) rises to the northeast, the Kőcsonka Peak (886 m) to the north; the river Frumoasa crosses the border in the south. In the west it is bordered by the Pagan Mountain (1,195 m), Kőnyak, and the Livezi Peak. Several mineral water springs can be found here.

== History ==
Its name was first recorded in 1333 when a ’sacerdos de Sancto Michaele’ was mentioned in a papal tithe register. In 1539, it was mentioned as Zent Mijhal, in 1684 as Csik Szent Mihály. Its Hungarian name received its current form in 1913. Until, 1919, its Romanian names was Sânmihaiu, then it was changed to Cic-Sânmihaiu, and finally the current official name. The village suffered a lot in 1694 on occasion of the Tartar invasion, it was then that the neighboring village called Cibrefalva was completely devastated.

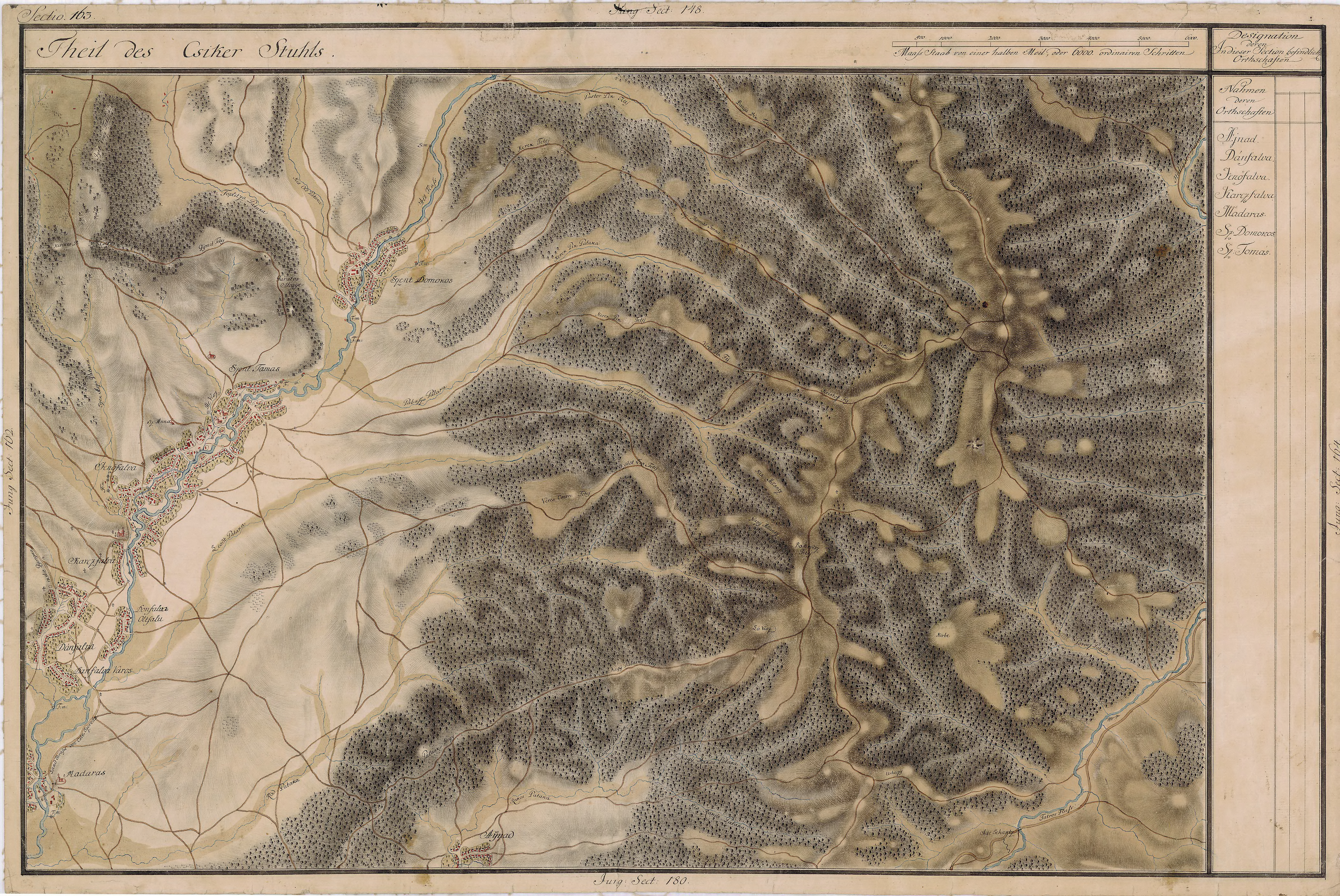
Aynad on the Josephinische Landaufnahme, 1769–1773

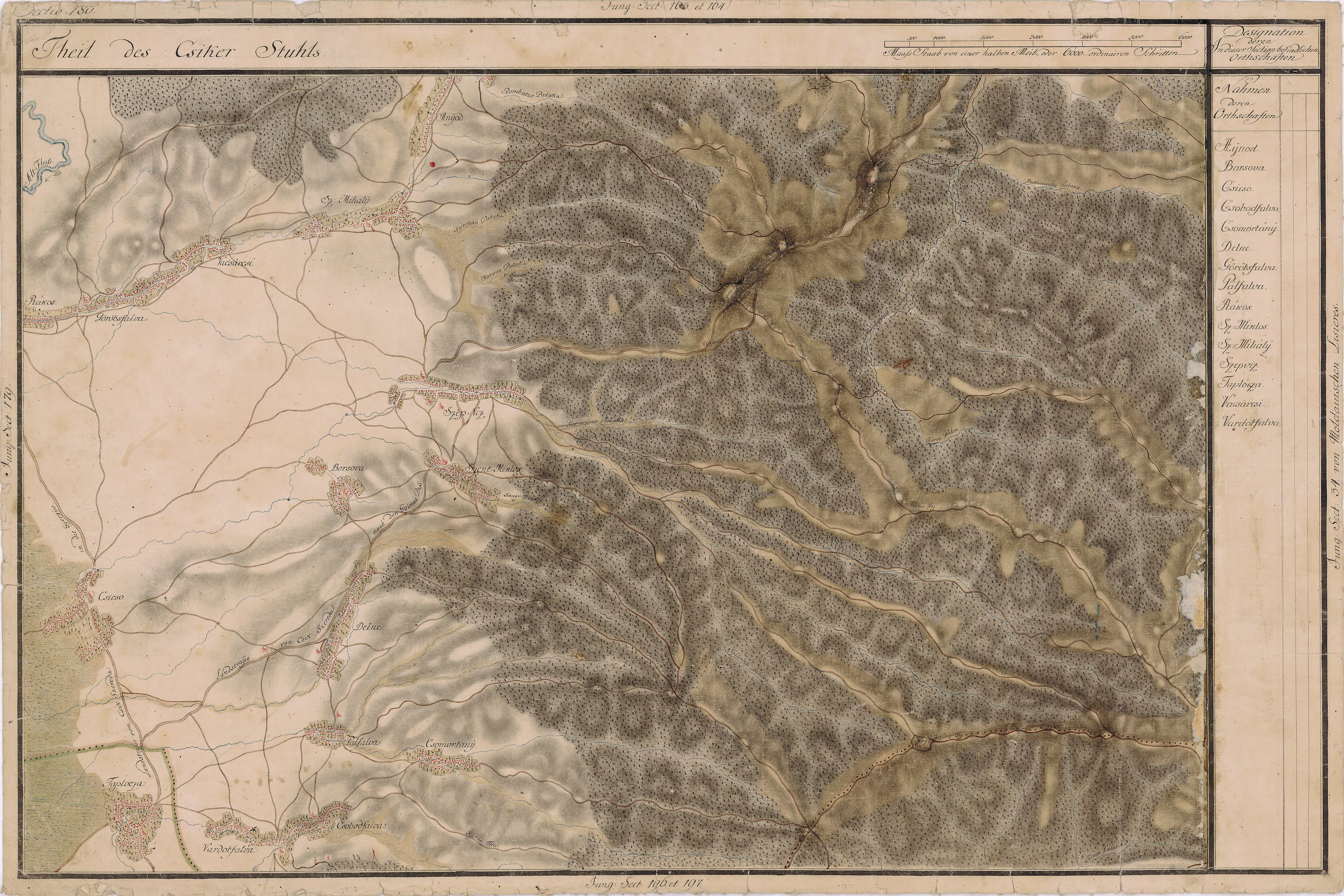
Anyad, Sz: Mihály and Vacsárcsi on the Josephinische Landaufnahme, 1769–1773

The component villages were historically part of the Székely Land area of Transylvania and belonged to Csíkszék district until the administrative reform of Transylvania in 1876, when they fell within Csík County in the Kingdom of Hungary. In the aftermath of World War I, the Union of Transylvania with Romania was declared in December 1918. At the start of the Hungarian–Romanian War of 1918–1919, the locality passed under Romanian administration. After the Treaty of Trianon of 1920, it became part of the Kingdom of Romania and fell within plasa Frumoasa of Ciuc County during the interwar period.

In 1940, the Second Vienna Award granted Northern Transylvania to Hungary. Towards the end of World War II, Romanian and Soviet armies entered the area in September 1944. The territory of Northern Transylvania remained under Soviet military administration until 9 March 1945, after which it became again part of Romania. In 1950, after Communist Romania was established, Mihăileni became part of the Ciuc Raion of Stalin Region. Between 1952 and 1960, the commune fell within the Magyar Autonomous Region, between 1960 and 1968 the Mureș-Magyar Autonomous Region. After the administrative reform of 1968, the region was abolished, and since then, the commune has been part of Harghita County.

== Demographics ==
Historical population
Year	Pop.	±%
1850	2,567	—
1930	3,457	+34.7%
1941	3,962	+14.6%
1977	3,271	−17.4%
2002	2,643	−19.2%
2011	2,644	+0.0%
2021	2,593	−1.9%
Source: Census data

The commune has an absolute Hungarian (Székely) majority, while the village of Livezi has an ethnic Romanian majority. According to the 2011 census, Mihăileni had a population of 2,644, of which 79.54% were Hungarians and 18.87% were Romanians. At the 2021 census, there were 2,593 inhabitants; of those, 77.21% were Hungarians, 13.88% Romanians, and 1.97% Roma.

== Landmarks ==
- The ruins of the Balaskó Castle are to be found on the Vártető, 6 km to the east of the village.
- The Roman Catholic fortified church was built between 1457 and 1467. It was set on fire by the Ottoman Turkish troops in 1661, then by the Tartar troops in 1694. The present church tower was built by Mihály Sándor in memory of his liberation from the Turkish captivity. The church was altered and expanded in 1819. In 1930, wall paintings from the 15th century were found. The wooden sculpture of St. Michael which used to stand on its altar, is now exhibited in the Museum of Miercurea Ciuc. It was thought to be from the time when Székely people were converted to Christianity.
- The Biális mansion was built in 1837 in a style characteristic for the mansions used by the Székely nobility,
- The Caracău Viaduct is 226 m (741 ft) long and 64 m (210 ft) high and is the longest of its kind in Transylvania. It was built in 1896 by the Hungarian State Railways (MÁV). The bridge was blown up both in World War I and World War II and it was finally rebuilt by the Romanian Railways Company (CFR) in 1946.

== Sports ==
It has a football club called Străduința Mihăileni (in Hungarian: Csíkszentmihályi Törekvés). Established in 1998, it has been playing in the Harghita district league since that time.

== Twinnings ==
The village is twinned with:

- Enese, Hungary
- Gabčíkovo, Slovakia
- St.Stefan, Austria
- Káva, Hungary
- Taksony, Hungary
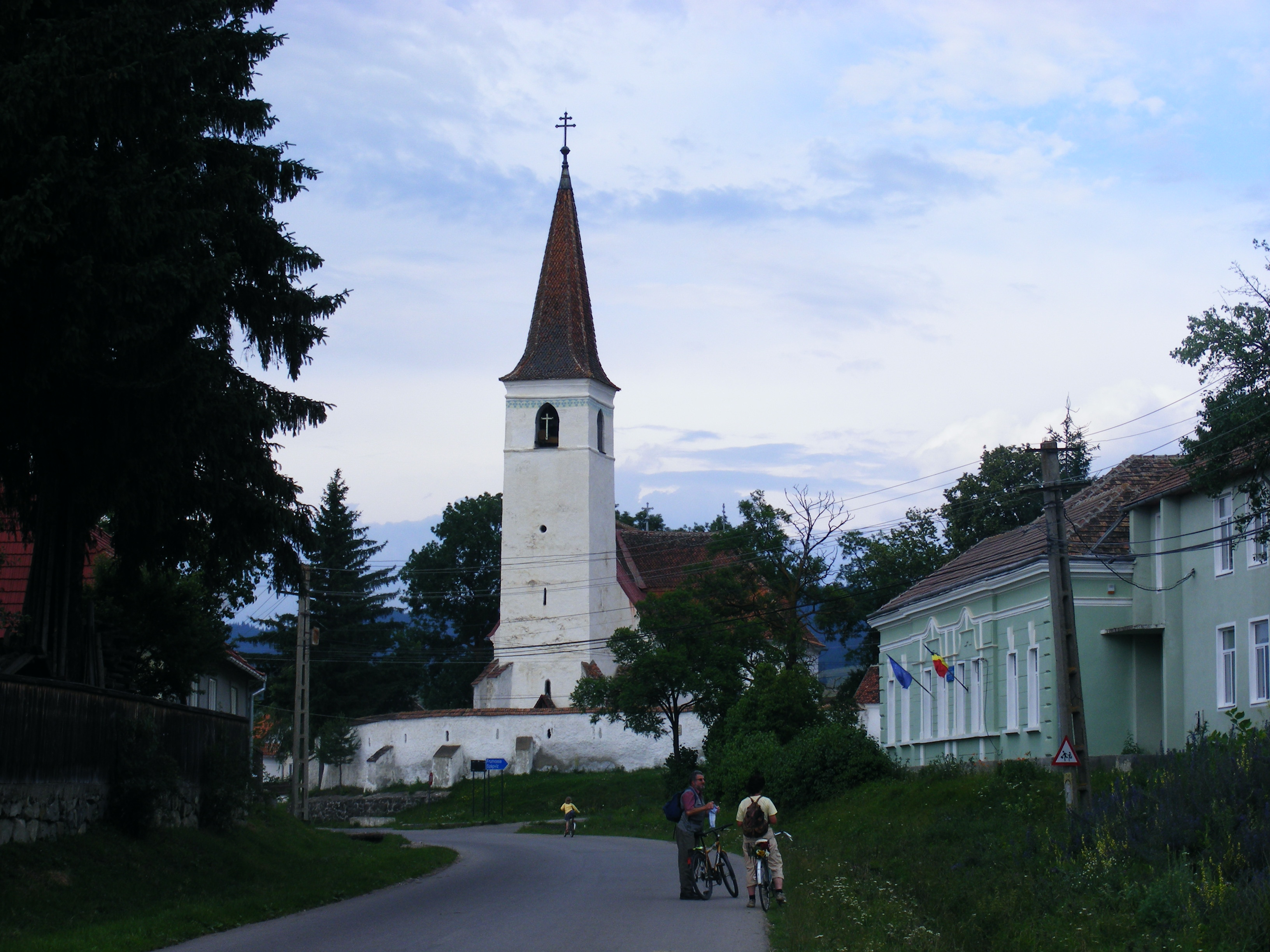
Roman Catholic church in Mihăileni

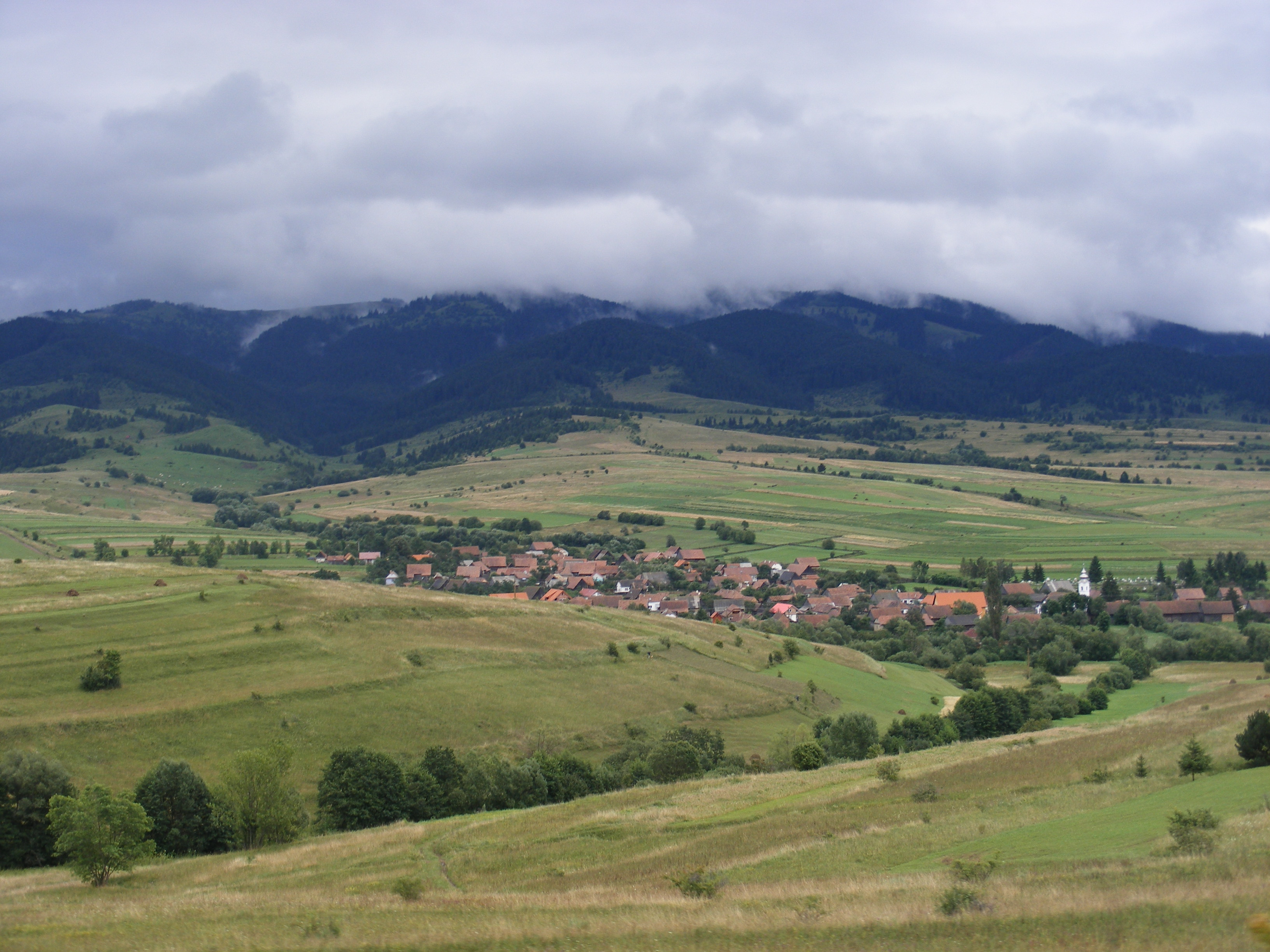
Nădejdea

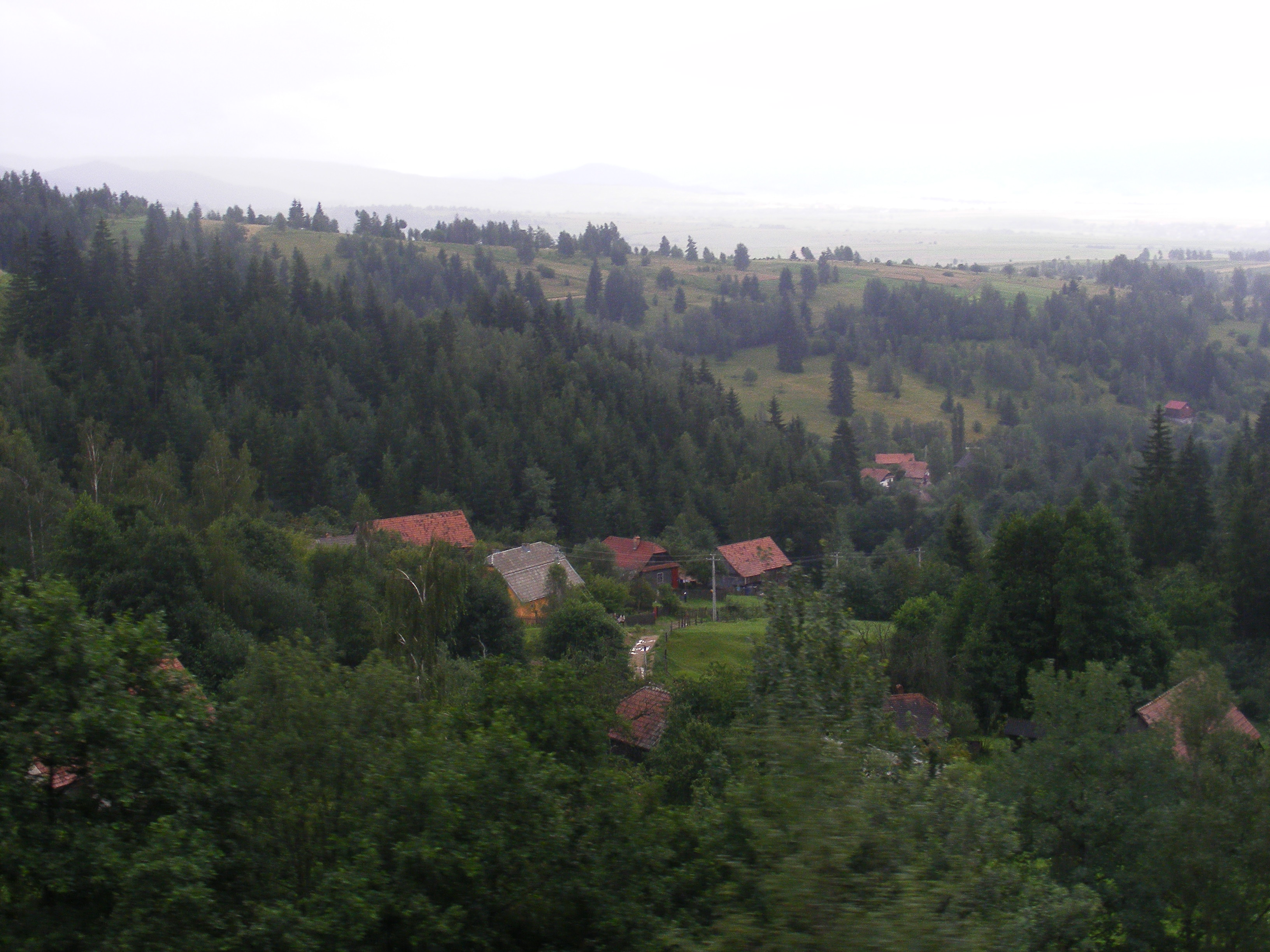
Houses in Livezi

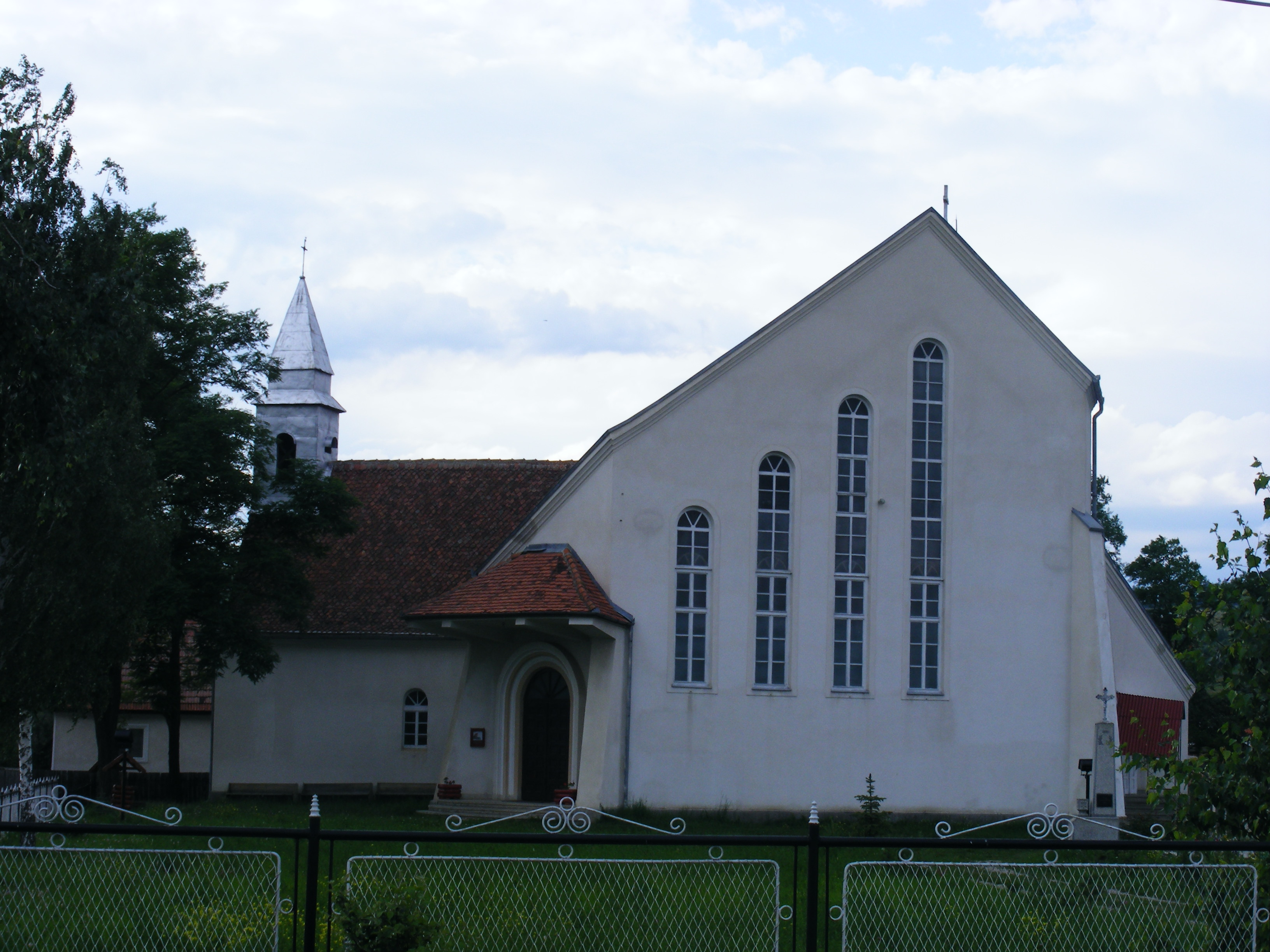
Romano-catholic church in Văcărești

== See also ==
- List of Székely settlements
