= Basarab Overpass =

Basarab Overpass Pasajul Basarab (in Romanian)
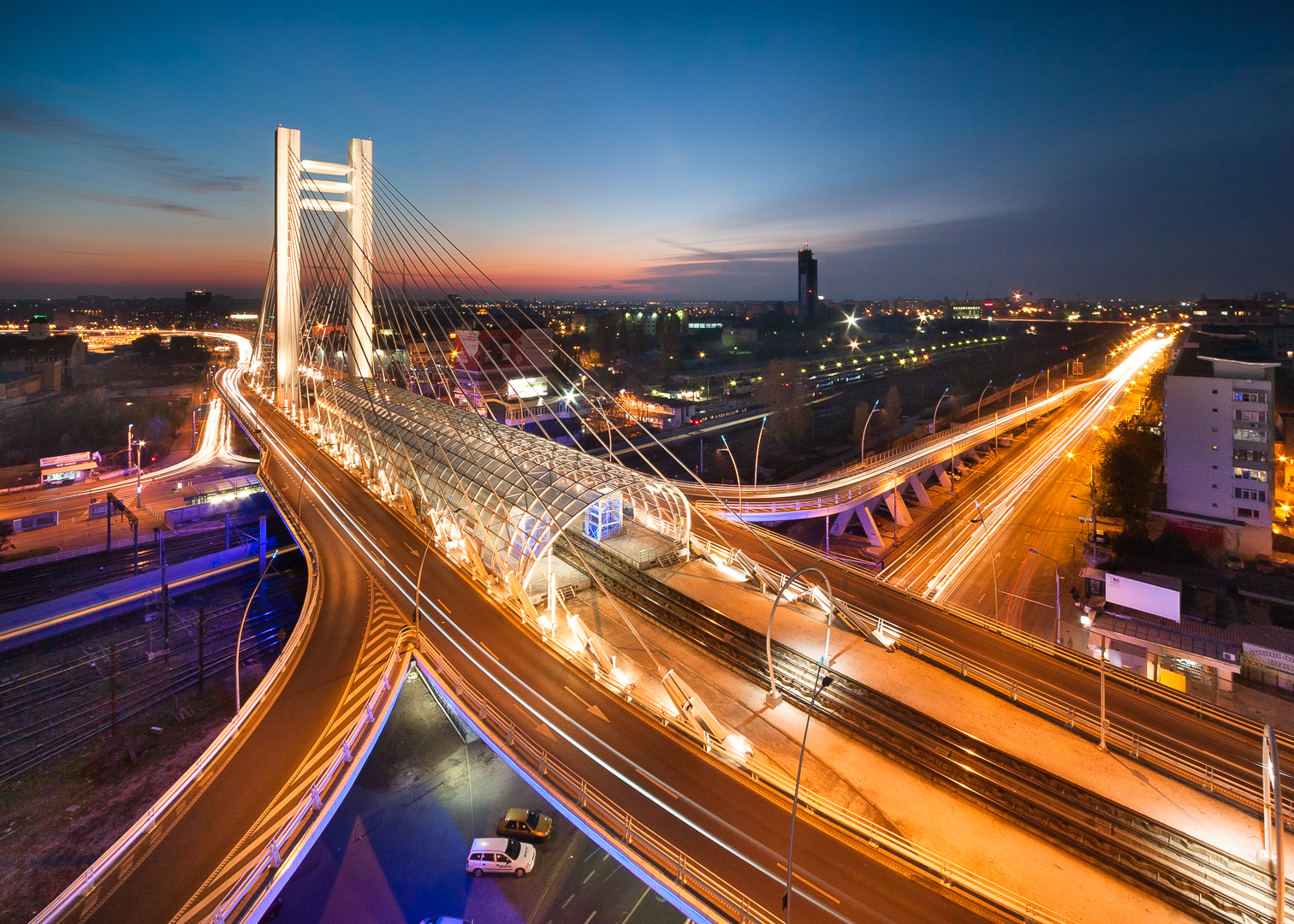
- Coordinates: 44.44945°N 26.06785°E
- Carries: Motor vehicles, pedestrians, trams
- Crosses: Dâmbovița River, Gara de Nord Rail tracks
- Locale: Bucharest, Romania
- Official name: Pasajul suprateran Basarab
- Website: pasajulbasarab.ro

Characteristics
- Design: Cable-stayed bridge
- Material: Concrete
- Total length: 1,920 metres (6,300 ft)
- Width: 43.3 metres (142 ft)

History
- Designer: Javier Manterola
- Constructed by: Astaldi SPA; FCC Contrucción SA
- Construction start: November 2006
- Construction end: August 2011
- Opened: 19 June 2011

Statistics
- Daily traffic: est. 50,000
- Toll: None

Location
- Interactive map of Basarab Overpass

The Basarab Overpass (Romanian: Pasajul Basarab) is a road overpass in Bucharest, Romania, connecting Nicolae Titulescu blvd. and Grozăvești Road, part of Bucharest's inner city ring. A design by engineer Javier Manterola, its construction was undertaken by FCC and Astaldi.

== History ==
Grozăvești Bridge

On 17 June 2011, the overpass was officially inaugurated, and was opened to traffic on 19 June. The project was completed in August 2011, when ramps and elevators for the tram stations were installed.

The bridge now accommodates the number 1 tram line, the only circular tram line in Bucharest that follows the inner traffic circle of the city.

== The Basarab Overpass in numbers ==
The Basarab Overpass has a length of 1.9 kilometres (1.2 mi) and is the widest cable stayed bridge in Europe, measuring a width of 44.5 metres (146 ft) (tram station, safety areas and two lanes for traffic in each direction) over the railways near the Gara de Nord train station (the average width measures almost 25 meters).

The two towers that sustain the 60 cables of the bridge have a height of about 84 metres (276 ft).

The overpass was opened in June 2011 at a cost of almost 255 million euros.

Every day, almost 50,000 vehicles cross the bridge.

== See also ==
- Tourism in Romania
- Seven Wonders of Romania
- List of bridges in Romania
