= Ostrovul Mare Bridge =

Bridge in Romania

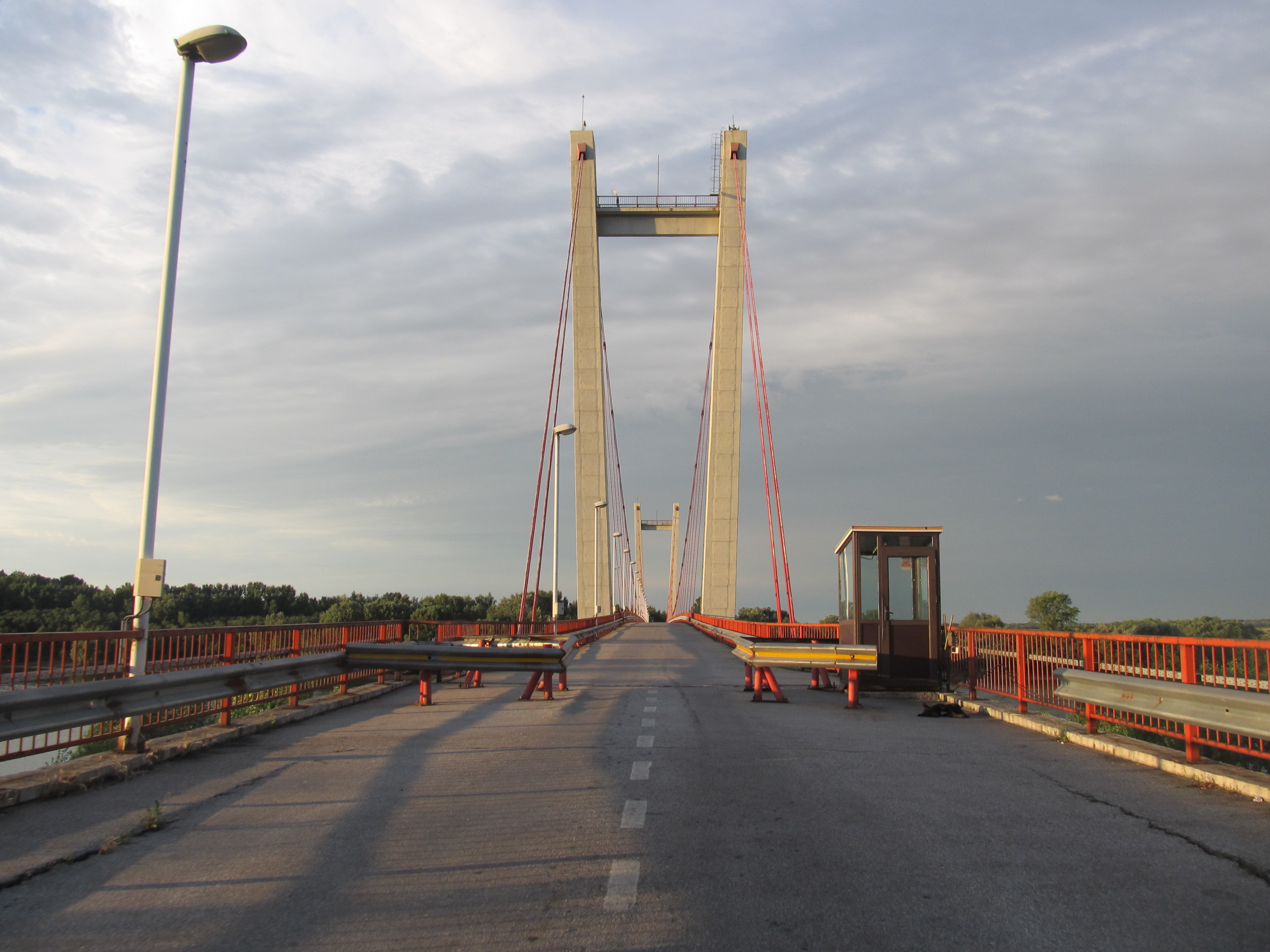
- Coordinates: 44°19′13″N 22°34′29″E
- Carries: DJ606G county road
- Crosses: Gogoșu branch of the Danube
- Locale: Between Balta Verde and Ostrovu Mare Island, Mehedinți County

Characteristics
- Design: Suspension bridge
- Total length: 360 m (1,180 ft)
- Width: 6 m (20 ft)
- Height: 54 m (177 ft) (towers)
- Longest span: 240 m (790 ft)

History
- Designer: IPTANA Bucharest
- Constructed by: Hidroconstrucția SA; Energomontaj SA
- Construction start: 1988
- Opened: 2003

The Ostrovul Mare Bridge is a bridge in Romania over the Gogoșu branch of the Danube. It is intended for complementary access to the Ostrovu Mare Island and the Iron Gate II Hydroelectric Power Station, respectively, at the local border crossing point between Romania and Serbia.

The bridge is 360 m (1,180 ft) in length with a main span of 240 m (790 ft), and is constructed as a suspension bridge.

== See also ==
- List of bridges in Romania
- List of international bridges
