= Racul =

- Location within Romania

Location
- Country: Romania
- Counties: Harghita County
- Villages: Livezi, Nădejdea, Mihăileni, Gârciu

Physical characteristics
- Mouth: Olt
  - coordinates: 46.4378°N 25.7547°E
- Length: 17 km (11 mi)
- Basin size: 126 km^{2} (49 sq mi)

Basin features
- Progression: Olt→ Danube→ Black Sea
- Tributaries
  - left: Frumoasa

The Racul is a left tributary of the river Olt in Romania. It discharges into the Olt in Siculeni. Its length is 17 km (11 mi) and its basin size 126 km^{2} (49 sq mi).
