= Decebal Bridge, Satu Mare =

Decebal Bridge Podul Decebal
- Coordinates: 47.786746°N 22.877952°E
- Carries: 4 lane road 2 pedestrian walkways
- Crosses: Someş River
- Locale: Satu Mare, Romania

Characteristics
- Design: Road bridge
- Total length: 630 m (2,070 ft)
- Width: 25 m (82 ft)
- Clearance below: 15 m (49 ft)

History
- Opened: 1988

Location
- Interactive map of Decebal Bridge

The Decebal Bridge (Romanian: Podul Decebal) crosses the lower Someş River to the central part of Satu Mare city, linking the residential districts of Soarelui and Centru Nou. It is named after the famous Dacian king Decebalus.

The main structure of the Decebal Bridge (without the additional access ramp located at one of the ends) is 443 m (1,453 ft) long, 25 m (82 ft) wide, and 20 m (66 ft) high.

== See also ==
- List of bridges in Romania
