= List of bridges in Romania =

This list of bridges in Romania lists bridges of particular historical, scenic, architectural or engineering interest. Road and railway bridges, viaducts, aqueducts and footbridges are included.

== Historical and architectural interest bridges ==
	Name	Romanian	Distinction	Length	Type	Carries Crosses	Opened	Location	Historical region Country	Ref.
1	Trajan's Bridge destroyed	Podul lui Traian		1,135 m (3,724 ft)	Masonry; Wooden truss arches, masonry piers	Danube	105	Drobeta-Turnu Severin–Kladovo; 44°37′08.3″N 22°40′03.1″E	Oltenia; Serbia	
2	Constantine's Bridge destroyed	Podul lui Constantin cel Mare	Considered the longest ancient river bridge	2,437 m (7,995 ft)	Masonry; Wooden truss arches, masonry piers	Danube	328	Corabia–Gigen; 43°45′48.4″N 24°27′25.2″E	Wallachia; Bulgaria	
3	Cănțălărești Medieval Bridge	Podul medieval din Cănțălărești	Historic monument		Masonry	Racovat	1636	Ștefan cel Mare	Moldavia	
4	Bridge of Lies	Podul Minciunilor	First cast iron bridge built in Romania; Historic monument	10 m (33 ft)	Arch; Cast iron deck arch	Footbridge	1860	Sibiu; 45°47′54.0″N 24°09′02.9″E	Transylvania	
5	Eiffel Bridge, Ungheni	Podul Eiffel	Designed by Gustave Eiffel		Truss	Prut	1887	Ungheni (Romania)–Ungheni (Moldova); 47°11′59.5″N 27°47′12.9″E	Moldavia; Republic of Moldova	
6	Iași Stone Bridge	Podul de piatră din Iași	Historic monument		Masonry; 3 segmental arches	Bahlui	19th century	Iași; 47°09′26.6″N 27°34′30.3″E	Moldavia	
7	Romanescu Parc Footbridge	Podul Suspendat			Suspension	Footbridge		Craiova; 44°18′00.5″N 23°48′37.5″E	Oltenia	
8	Sălăuța River Covered Bridge	Podul grăniceresc peste râul Sălauța	Historic monument		Covered bridge Wood	Sălăuța	1937	Coșbuc; 47°21′40.9″N 24°23′17.2″E	Transylvania	
9	Aciliu Viaduct	Viaductul Aciliu	Highest bridge in Romania; Height : 80 m (260 ft)	1,100 m (3,600 ft)	Beam bridge Composite steel/concrete deck	A1 motorway	2014	Apoldu de Jos–Săliște; 45°49′32.7″N 23°51′56.3″E	Transylvania	

== Major road and railway bridges ==
This table presents the structures with spans greater than 100 meters (non-exhaustive list).

	Name	Romanian	Span	Length	Type	Carries Crosses	Opened	Location	Historical region Country	Ref.
1	Brăila Bridge	Podul peste Dunăre de la Brăila	1,120 m (3,670 ft)	2,194 m (7,198 ft)	Suspension; Steel box girder deck, concrete pylons 489+1120+364	National road DN2S; Danube	2023	Brăila–Smârdan; 45°18′53.3″N 28°00′09.7″E	Muntenia; Dobruja	
2	Ostrovul Mare Bridge	Podul Ostrovu Mare	240 m (790 ft)	360 m (1,180 ft)	Suspension; Central span steel deck, side spans concrete deck, concrete pylons 60+240+60	County road DJ606G; Gogoșu branch (Danube)	1998	Gogoșu–Ostrovu Mare Island; 44°19′14.7″N 22°34′29.4″E	Oltenia	
3	Agigea New Bridge	Podul Nou Agigea	200 m (660 ft)	906 m (2,972 ft)	Cable-stayed; Steel box girder deck, concrete pylons 81+200+81	Road bridge Danube–Black Sea Canal	2013	Agigea; 44°05′59.5″N 28°38′04.8″E	Dobruja	
4	Transilvania Bridge Satu Mare	Podul Transilvania	195 m (640 ft)	644 m (2,113 ft)	Cable-stayed; Steel box girder deck, concrete pylons 100+195+100	Ștrandului Street; Someș	2025	Satu Mare; 47°47′04.7″N 22°53′17.8″E	Transylvania	
5	Arad New Bridge under construction	Podul Nou Arad	195 m (640 ft)	295 m (968 ft)	Cable-stayed; Steel box girder deck, concrete pylon 50+195+50	Road bridge Mureș (river)	2025	Arad; 46°09′34.5″N 21°17′56.7″E	Crișana	
6	King Carol I Bridge	Podul Anghel Saligny	190 m (620 ft)	1,662 m (5,453 ft)	Truss; Steel; 2x140+190+2x140	Railway bridge Danube	1895	Cernavodă–Fetești; 44°20′25.3″N 28°01′01.5″E	Dobruja; Muntenia	
7	Cernavodă Bridge	Podul Cernavodă	190 m (620 ft)	1,640 m (5,380 ft)	Truss; Steel; 140+190+140	A2 motorway European route E81; Căile Ferate Române Line 800; Danube	1987	Cernavodă–Fetești; 44°20′23.0″N 28°01′00.3″E	Dobruja; Muntenia	(Note: The given length is for the railway bridge, the road bridge has access viaduct on the west side and both have common part over the Danube.)
8	New Europe Bridge	Podul Noua Europă	180 m (590 ft)(x3)	1,391 m (4,564 ft)	Extradosed; Concrete box girder deck, 4 concrete pylons 124+3x180+124	National road DN56; European route E79; Railway bridge Danube	2013	Calafat–Vidin; 44°00′08.8″N 22°56′54.5″E	Oltenia; Bulgaria	(Note: The road part of the New Europe Bridge is 1,391 m (4,564 ft) long, the railway part is longer with its access viaducts measuring 1,791 m (5,876 ft).)
9	Saint Mary Bridge	Podul Sfânta Maria	172 m (564 ft)		Arch; Steel tied arch Bow-string bridge	County road DJ223; Danube–Black Sea Canal	2001	Cernavodă; 44°20′18.4″N 28°01′43.3″E	Dobruja	
10	Basarab Bridge	Podul Basarab	168 m (551 ft)	1,626 m (5,335 ft)	Cable-stayed; Composite steel/concrete deck, concrete pylon 168+75	Basarab Overpass; Bucharest's inner city ring Bucharest Tram; Bucharest North railway station	2011	Bucharest; 44°27′00.0″N 26°04′07.3″E	Muntenia	
11	Bridge over Siret under construction	Pod peste Siret	165 m (541 ft)	1,791 m (5,876 ft)	Cable-stayed; Steel box girder deck, concrete pylons 71+165+71	Viaduct bridge on the Galați–Brăila Expressway; Siret (river)	2025	Galați; 45°23′45.1″N 27°58′19.5″E	Moldavia; Muntenia	
12	Agigea Bridge	Podul Agigea	162 m (531 ft)	270 m (890 ft)	Cable-stayed; Composite steel/concrete deck, concrete pylon	National road DN39; European route E87; Danube–Black Sea Canal	1983	Agigea; 44°6′2.6″N 28°36′28.8″E	Dobruja	
13	Danube Bridge	Podul Prieteniei	160 m (520 ft)(x4)	2,223 m (7,293 ft)	Truss; Steel, 2 levels Vertical-lift bridge 2x160+86+2x160	National road DN5; European route E70; European route E85; Railway bridge Danube	1954	Giurgiu–Ruse; 43°53′16.5″N 26°00′24.1″E	Muntenia; Bulgaria	
14	Giurgeni–Vadu Oii Bridge	Podul Giurgeni-Vadul Oii	160 m (520 ft)(x3)	1,456 m (4,777 ft)	Box girder Steel; 120+3x160+120	National road DN2A; European route E60; Danube	1970	Giurgeni–Hârșova; 44°45′14.8″N 27°52′37.5″E	Muntenia; Dobruja	
15	Mureș A1 Bridge	Podul Mureș	150 m (490 ft)		Box girder Prestressed concrete	A1 motorway Mureș (river)	2011	Arad; 46°09′35.1″N 21°17′21.2″E	Crișana	
16	Borcea Bridge	Podul Borcea	140 m (460 ft)(x3)	970 m (3,180 ft)	Truss; Steel; 3x140	Railway bridge Borcea branch (Danube)	1895	Fetești; 44°22′48.5″N 27°51′18.9″E	Muntenia	
17	New Borcea Bridge	Nou podul Borcea	140 m (460 ft)(x3)	971 m (3,186 ft)	Truss; Steel; 3x140	A2 motorway European route E81; Căile Ferate Române Line 800; Borcea branch (Danube)	1987	Fetești; 44°22′50.9″N 27°51′20.0″E	Muntenia	
18	Medgidia Rail Bridge	Podul Feroviar Medgidia	135 m (443 ft)		Truss; Steel	Railway bridge Danube–Black Sea Canal	1983	Medgidia; 44°14′59.6″N 28°18′48.4″E	Dobruja	
19	Galați Bridge	Podul Galați	134 m (440 ft)	337 m (1,106 ft)	Box girder Prestressed concrete 67+134+67	National road DN22B; Siret (river)	1985	Galați; 45°24′05.3″N 28°00′54.9″E	Moldavia	
20	Medgidia Road Bridge	Podul Medgidia	131 m (430 ft)	669 m (2,195 ft)	Arch; Steel tied arch Bow-string bridge	County road DJ222; Danube–Black Sea Canal	1983	Medgidia; 44°15′02.5″N 28°15′42.5″E	Dobruja	
21	Grozăvești Bridge	Podul Grozăvești	122 m (400 ft)	1,626 m (5,335 ft)	Arch; Steel tied arch Bow-string bridge	Basarab Overpass; Bucharest's inner city ring Bucharest Tram; Dâmbovița (river)	2011	Bucharest; 44°26′35.0″N 26°03′38.1″E	Muntenia	
22	Golescu Bridge	Podul Golescu	120 m (390 ft)	520 m (1,710 ft)	Box girder Prestressed concrete	Road bridge Someș	1976	Satu Mare; 47°47′17.5″N 22°52′01.2″E	Transylvania	
23	Canal Siderca Bridge		120 m (390 ft)	855 m (2,805 ft)	Box girder Prestressed concrete 66+120+66	National road DN3B; Canal Siderca	1991	Călărași; 44°10′08.6″N 27°18′48.9″E	Muntenia	
24	Galați Bypass Bridge	Pasaj Centura Galați	120 m (390 ft)	530 m (1,740 ft)	Cable-stayed; Steel box girder deck, concrete pylon 2x120+35	Galați's inner city ring County road DJ251	2025	Galați; 45°27′00.5″N 28°00′45.0″E	Moldavia	
25	Basarabi Bridge	Podul Basarabi	104 m (341 ft)		Arch; Steel tied arch Bow-string bridge	National road DN3; Danube–Black Sea Canal	1983	Murfatlar; 44°10′12.0″N 28°24′29.9″E	Dobruja	
26	Caracău Viaduct	Viaductul Caracău	102 m (335 ft)	265 m (869 ft)	Arch; Concrete deck arch	Railway bridge	1946	Mihăileni, Harghita; 46°31′28.4″N 25°52′20.4″E	Transylvania	
27	New bridge over Dâmbovița	Noul pod peste Dâmbovița	100 m (330 ft)	170 m (560 ft)	Arch; Open-spandrel deck arch bridge 35+100+35	National road DN73; European route E574; Dâmbovița (river)	2023	Podu Dâmboviței; 45°24′15.0″N 25°12′06.0″E	Muntenia	

== Notes and references ==
- Notes
- Nicolas Janberg. "International Database for Civil and Structural Engineering". Structurae.com.
- Others references

== See also ==
- List of crossings of the Danube
- Transport in Romania
- Roads in Romania
- Highways in Romania
- Rail transport in Romania
- Geography of Romania
