= Golescu Bridge, Satu Mare =

Golescu Bridge Podul Golescu
- Coordinates: 47°47′17″N 22°52′01″E
- Carries: 4-lane road 2 pedestrian walkways
- Crosses: Someș River
- Locale: Satu Mare, Romania

Characteristics
- Design: Box girder bridge
- Total length: 520 m (1,710 ft)
- Width: 20 m (66 ft)
- Longest span: 120 m (390 ft)

History
- Opened: 10 November 1976

Location
- Interactive map of Golescu Bridge

The Golescu Bridge (Romanian: Podul Golescu) crosses the lower Someș River to the western part of Satu Mare city, linking the residential districts of Horea and Centru Nou. It is named after Nicolae Golescu, a Wallachian Romanian politician who served as the Prime Minister of Romania in 1860 and May–November 1868.

== See also ==
- List of bridges in Romania
