= Transilvania Bridge Satu Mare =

Transilvania Bridge Podul Transilvania
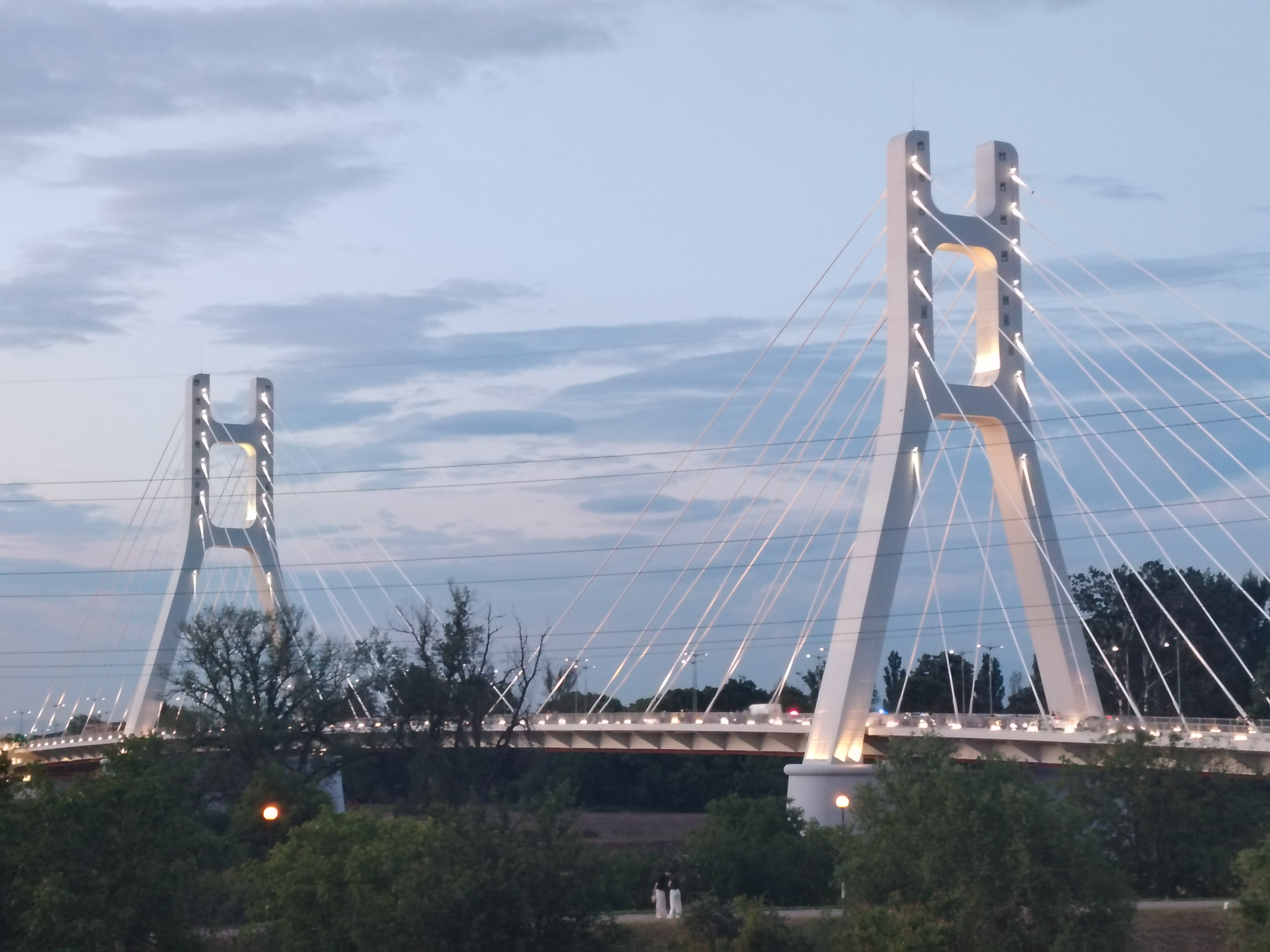
- Transilvania Bridge Satu Mare
- Coordinates: 47.784641°N 22.888182°E
- Carries: 4 lane road 2 pedestrian walkways 1 bike path
- Crosses: Someș River
- Locale: Satu Mare, Romania

Characteristics
- Design: Cable-stayed bridge modified fan design
- Material: Steel rope, post-tensioned concrete box girders, concrete pylons
- Total length: 644 m
- Width: 25 m
- Height: 73 m
- Longest span: 195 m

History
- Architect: Dan Sima, Mihai Predescu
- Designer: NV Construct Cluj-Napoca
- Contracted lead designer: Integrated Road Solutions Bucharest
- Constructed by: Strabag – ARL Cluj
- Opened: 30 May 2025

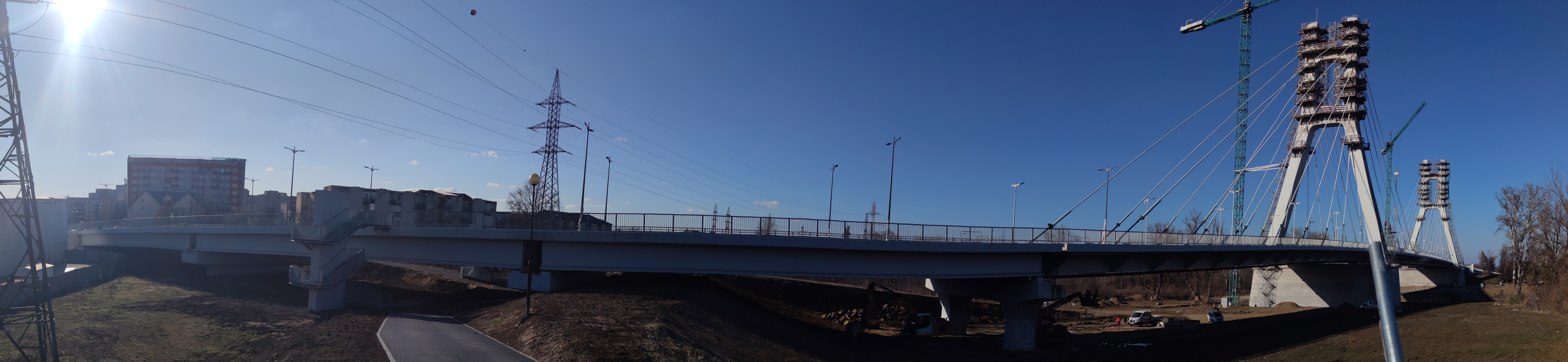
Panorama view of Transilvania bridge in Satu Mare

The Transilvania Bridge in Satu Mare, is a road, pedestrian, and cycling cable-stayed bridge over the Someș River, connecting Independenței Boulevard – Micro 17 neighborhood on the left bank and Henri Coandă Boulevard on the right bank, and overlapping Strandului Street. It is the largest infrastructure project of the city since the 1990s and one of the longest cable stayed bridge in Romania. Inaugurated on 30 May 2025, the bridge is a unique construction in north-western Romania.

== History ==
At the end of 2016 the technical project was tendered, and the contract was awarded to NV Construct Cluj. The cable stayed bridge was designed by subcontractor Integrated Road Solutions and the project was delivered in 2018.

In December 2017 the co-financing contract with the Ministry of Regional Development, Public Administration, and European Funds under PNDL2 was signed.

In 2017 the expropriations were carried out and paid for

In 2019 the execution tender was launched, which was awarded to the company Strabag. The construction work for the third bridge over the Someș River in Satu Mare began in 2020.

== Characteristics ==
According to the specialist report, the structure of the third bridge is supported by two pylons, through special steel cables arranged symmetrically in a modified fan design. The cable-stayed assembly, which supports the bridge, has a weight of 216 tons and consists of 56 cables. The cables will support a weight of 12,000 tons. It is a spectacular work that requires a lot of precision and can only be done by a few specialists. The operation will be carried out by the German company DYWIDAG, world leaders in the field. Upon completion, the bridge in Satu Mare will be, in terms of span, the third cable-stayed bridge in Romania. It is planned to have four traffic lanes, with two lanes in each direction, two sidewalks with pedestrian barriers, and a bicycle lane. For access from the embankments to the sidewalks of the bridge, four stairs are planned, with two [stairs on each embankment, and for the safety of pedestrian traffic, metal protective barriers will be installed on ramps, viaducts, and the bridge, as well as on the access stairs from the embankments. The bridge over the Someș River – located on Ștrandului Street is a historic investment for Satu Mare, and the Austrian constructor Strabag is mobilizing significant resources to ensure the completion deadline is met.

== Gallery ==
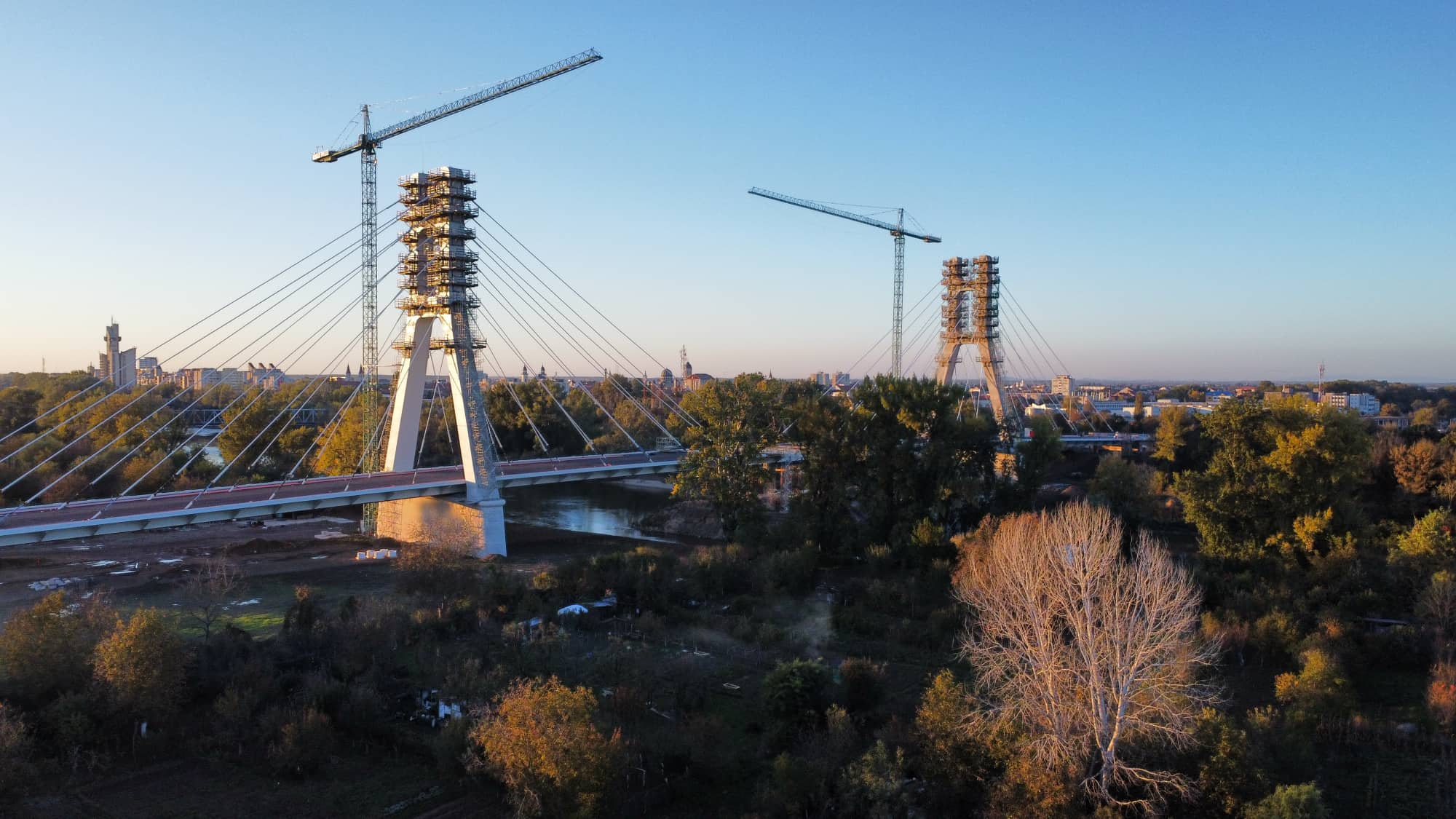
Transilvania bridge Satu Mare - view from Micro 17 neighborhood

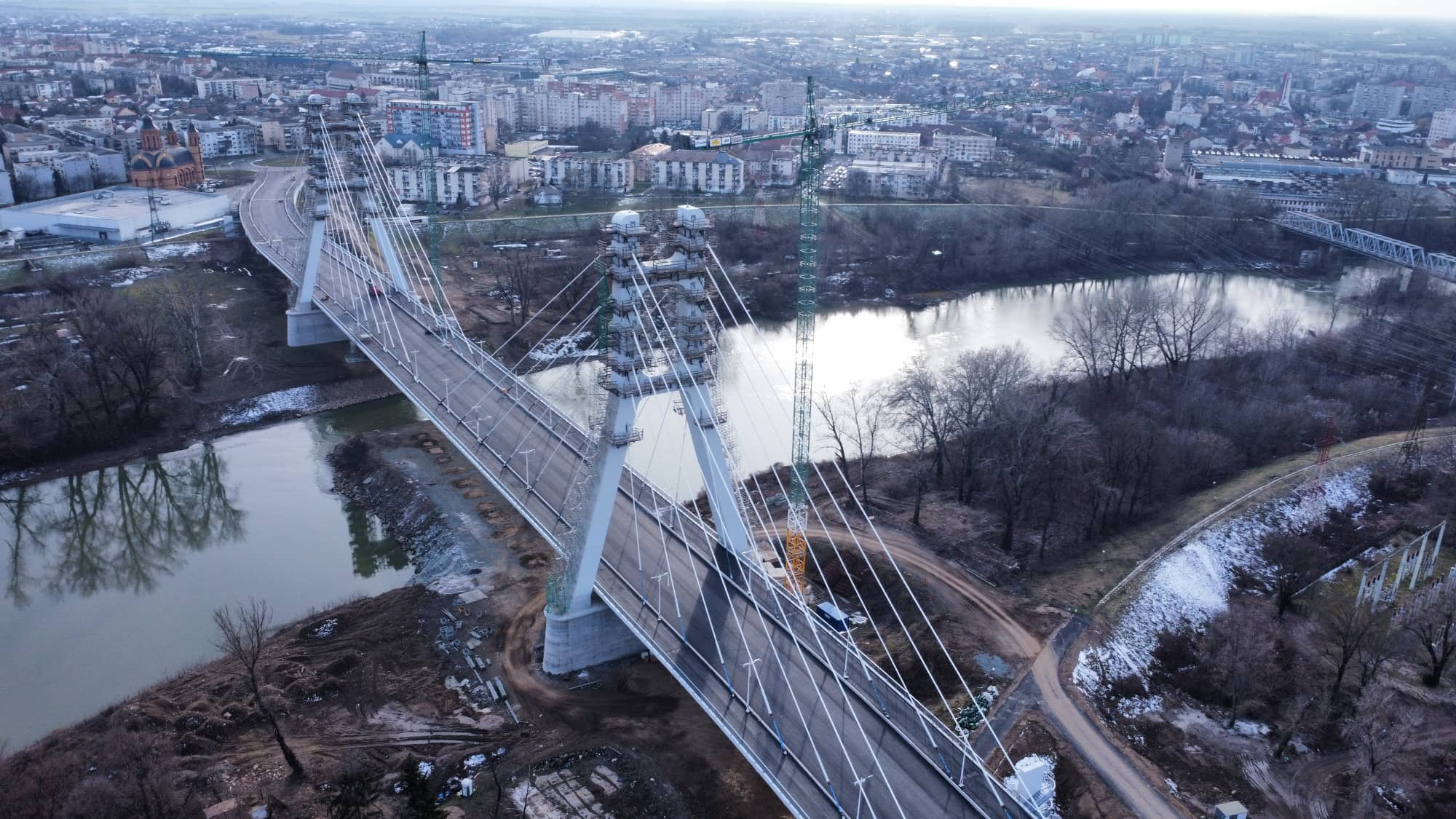
Transilvania bridge Satu Mare - view from Ștrandului street

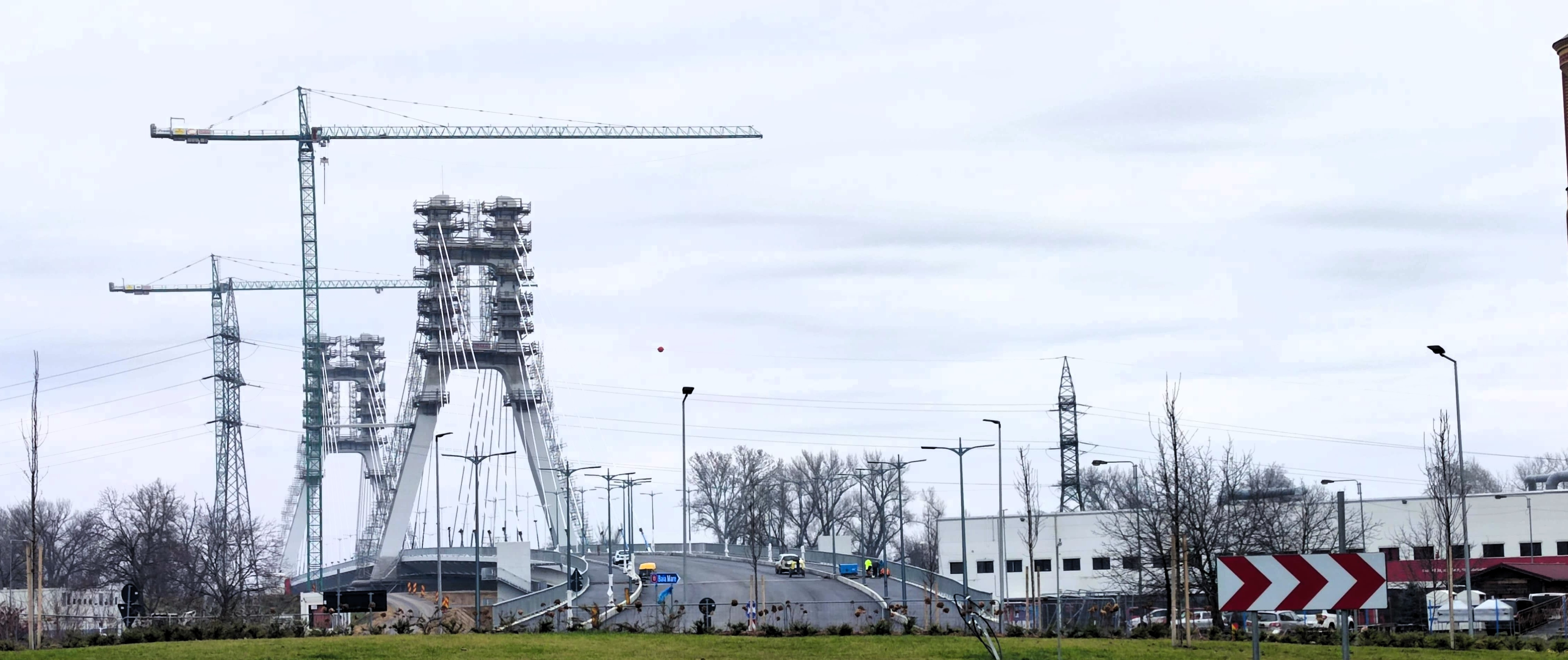
Transilvania bridge Satu Mare - view from the roundabout of Independenței boulevard

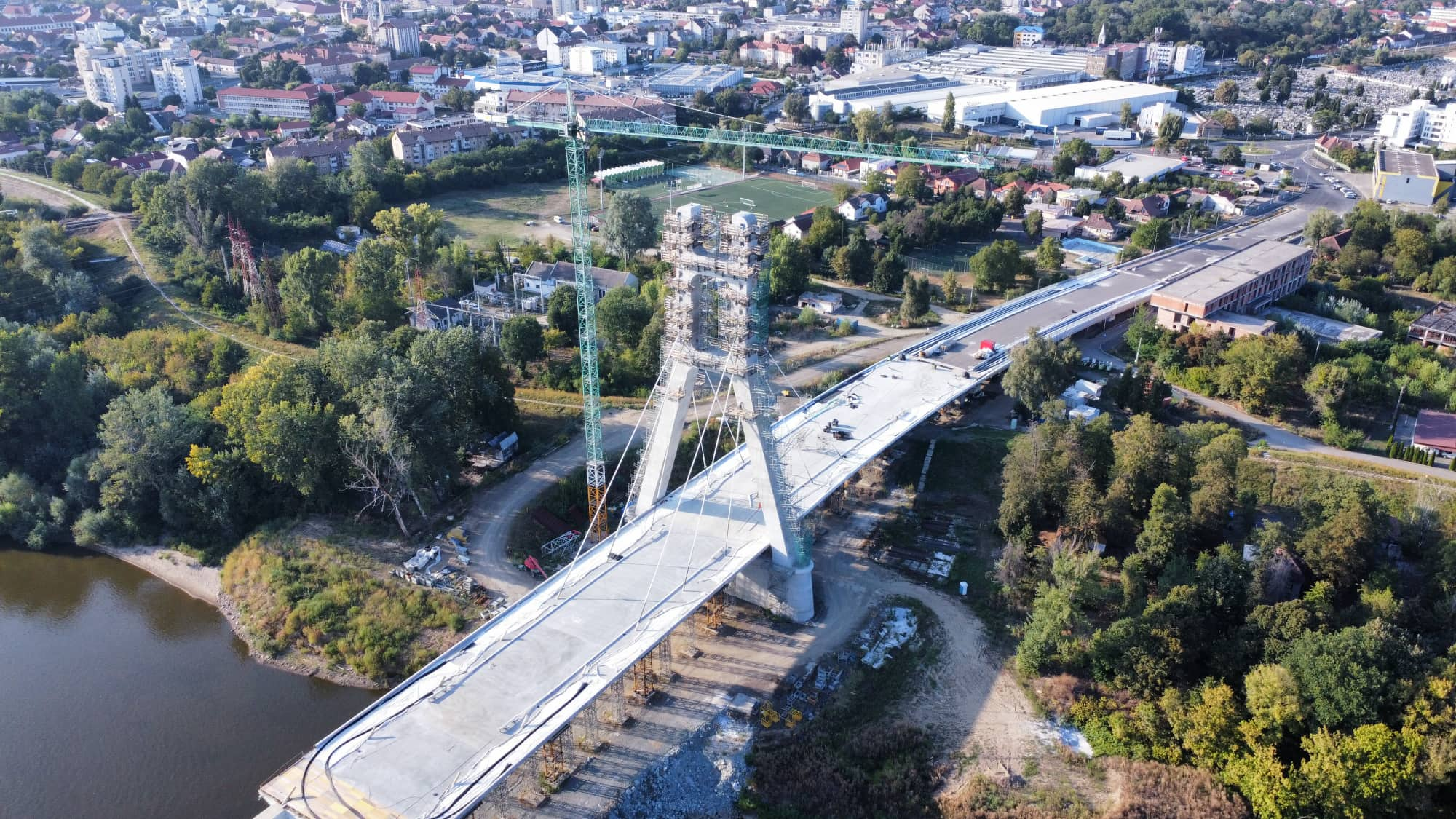
Transilvania bridge Satu Mare - view from Ștrandului street

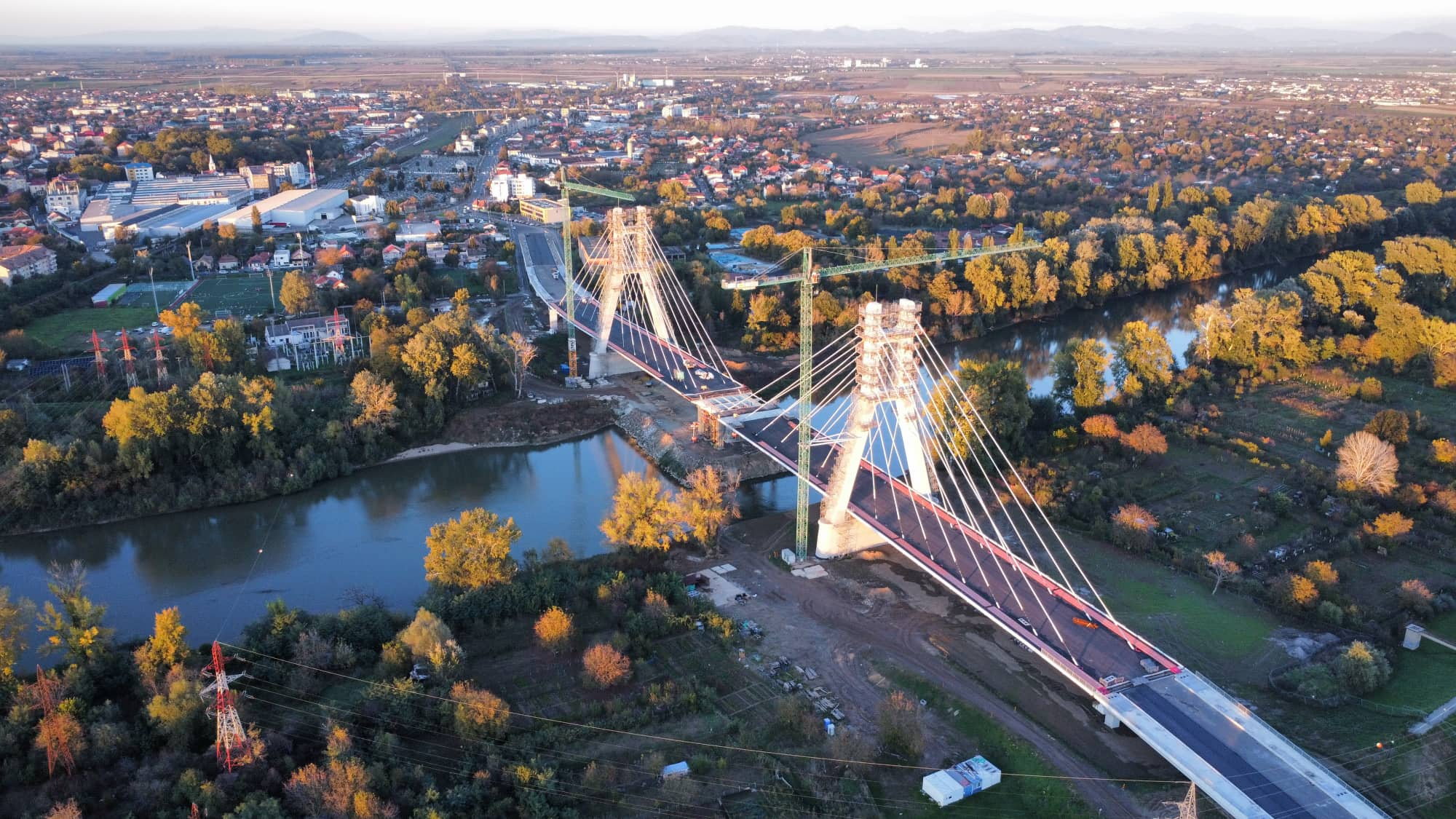
Transilvania bridge Satu Mare - view from Micro 17 neighborhood

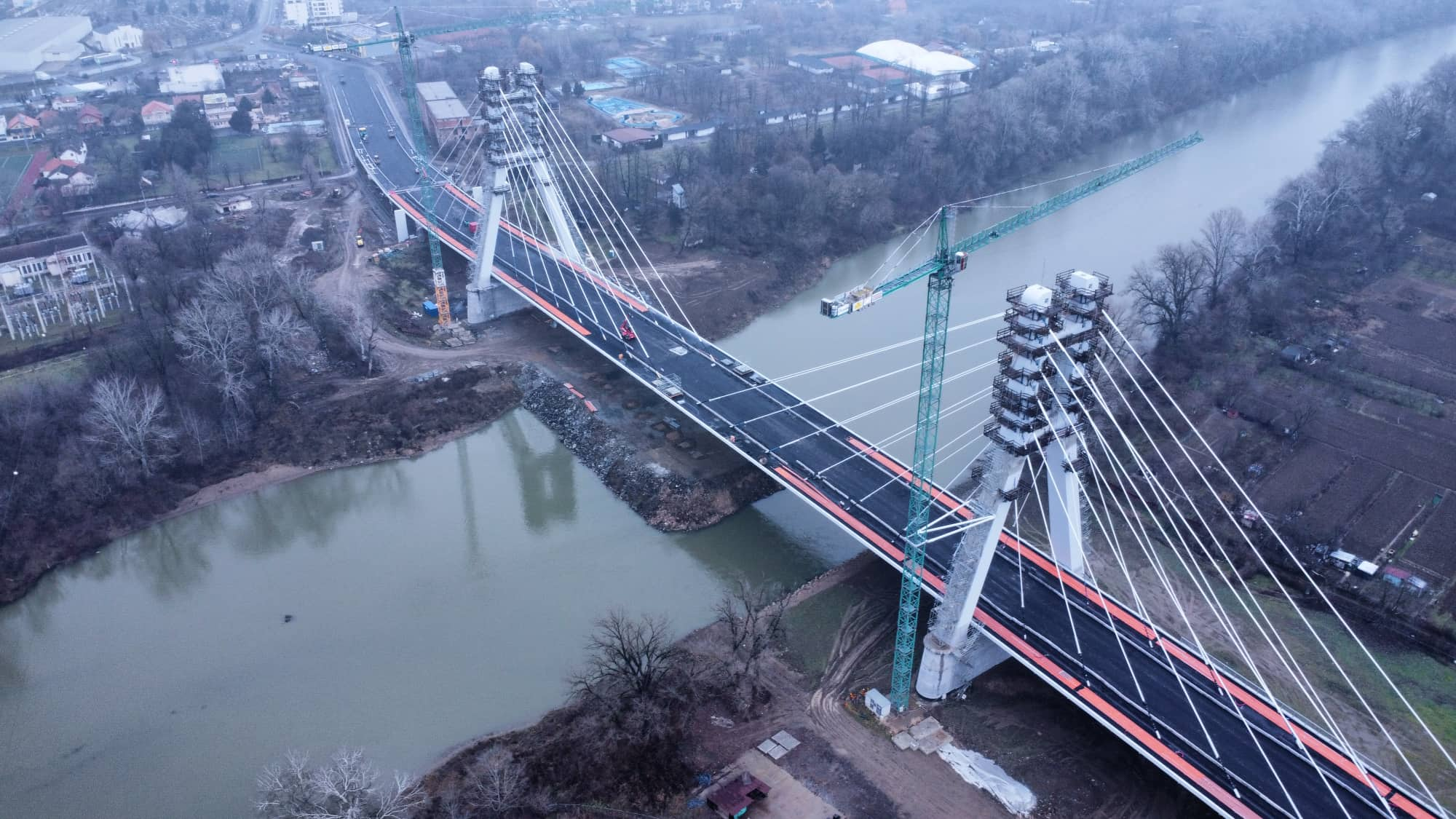
Transilvania bridge Satu Mare aerial view

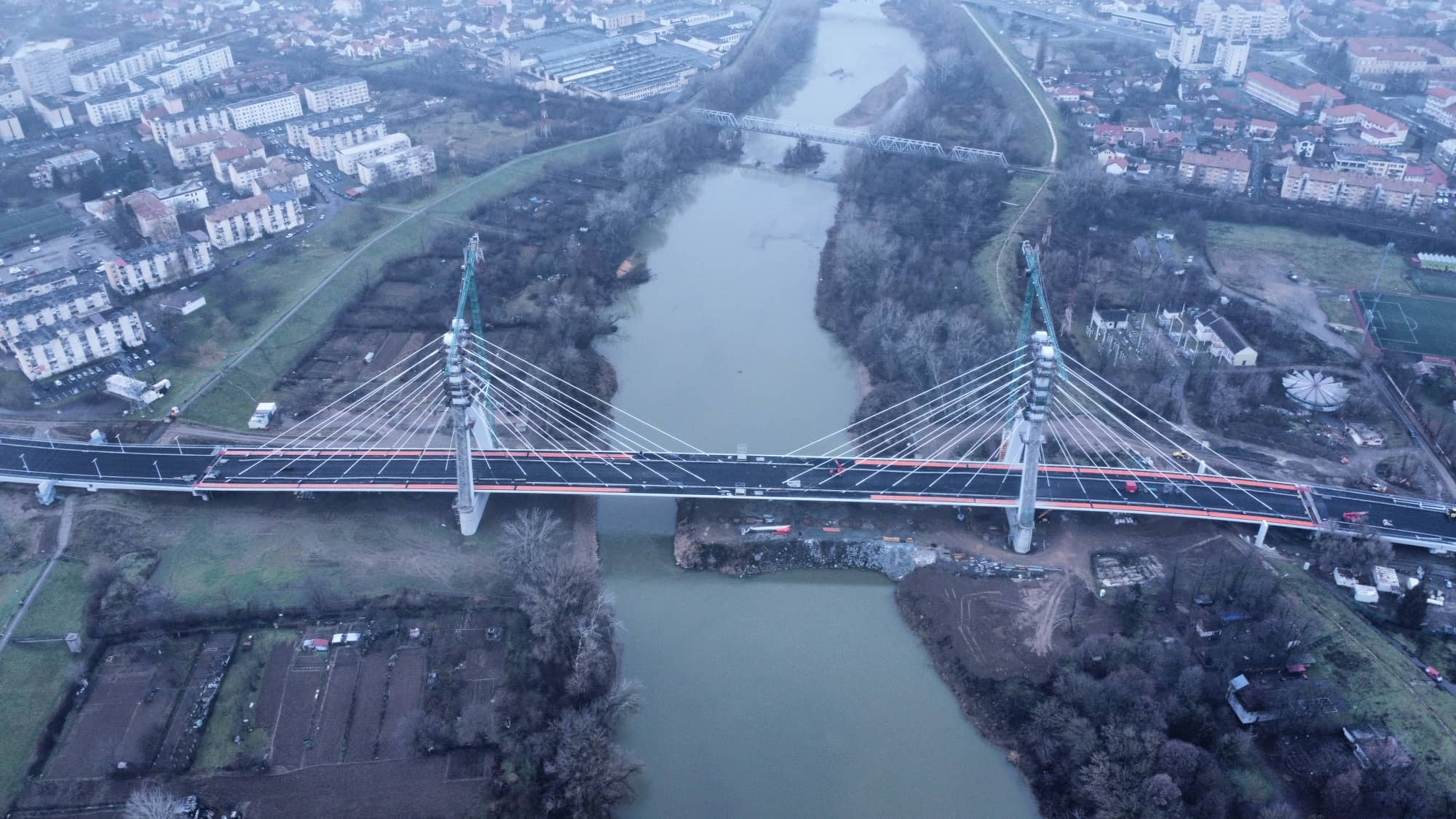
Transilvania bridge Satu Mare drone aerial view

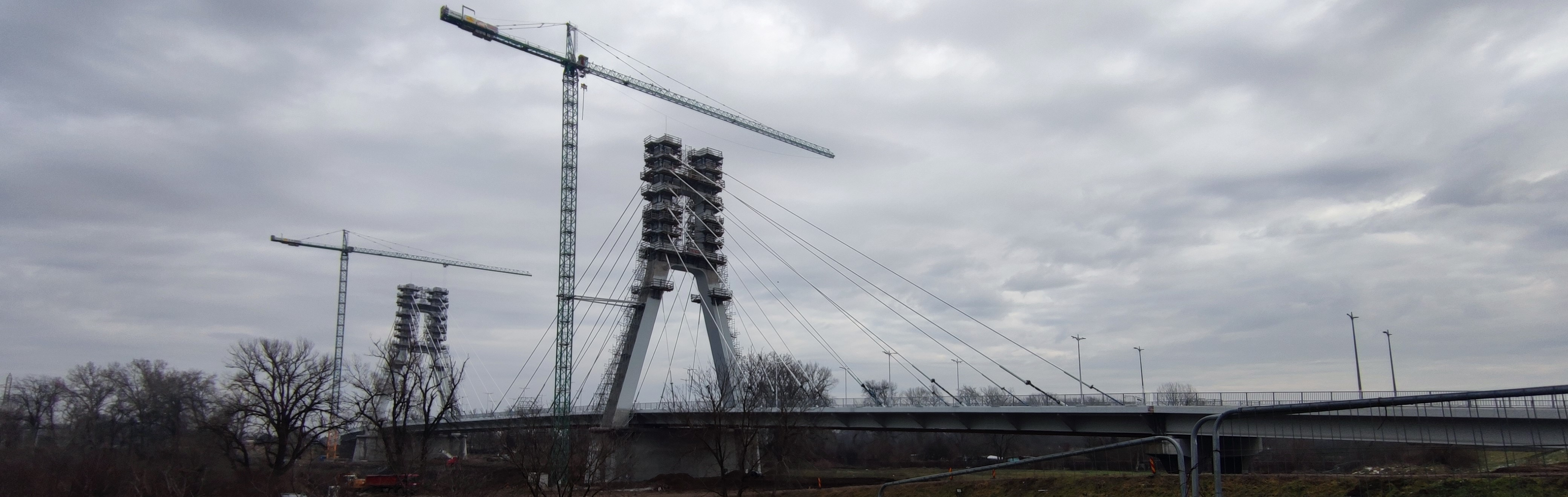
Transilvania bridge Satu Mare - view from left bank of Someș

== See also ==
- List of bridges in Romania
