= Horea, Satu Mare =

Coordinates: 47°41′04″N 22°14′08″E

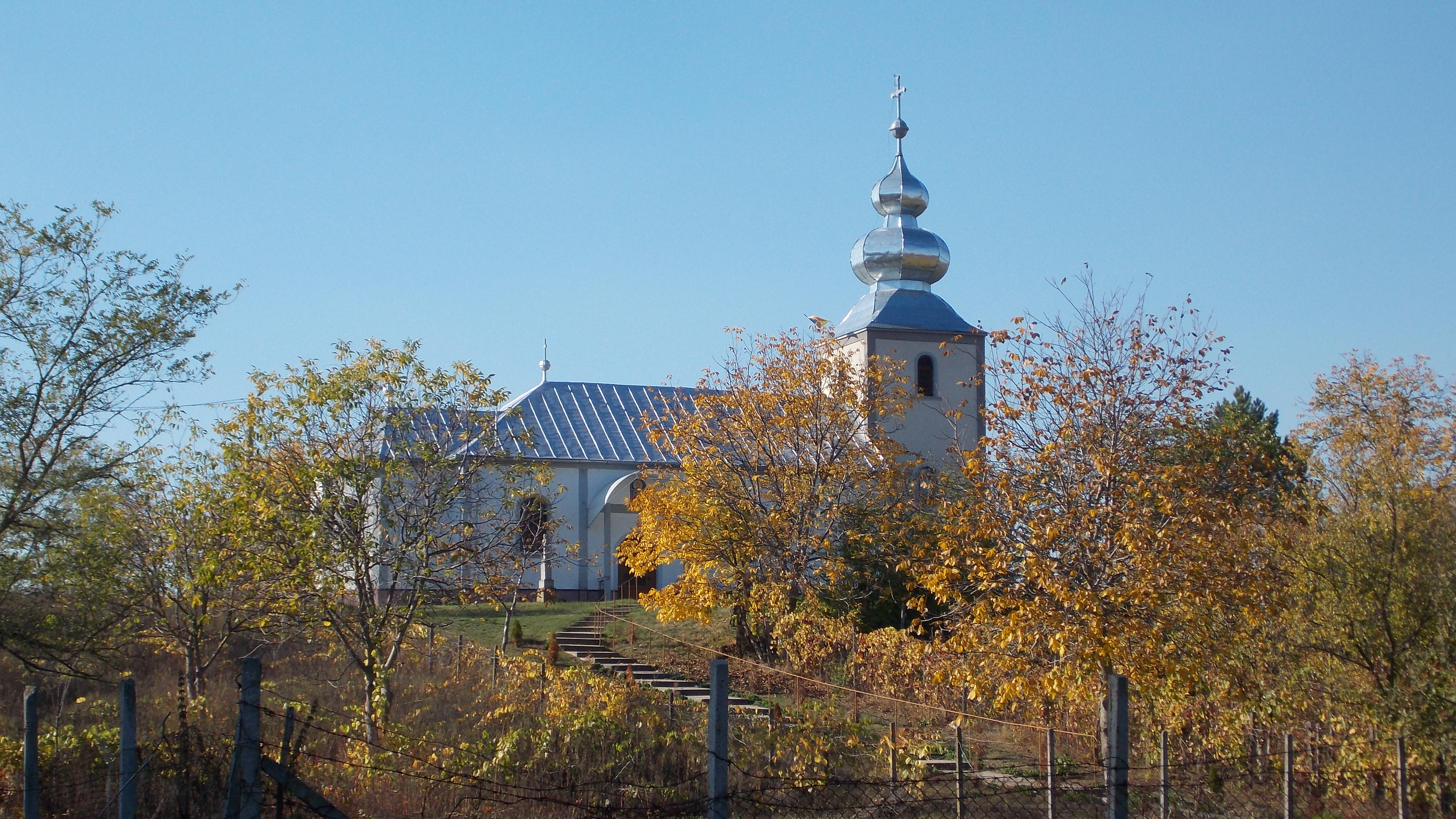
Horea SM orthodox church

Horea (also known as Micro 16) is a residential district of Satu Mare in Romania. It is named after the Romanian revolutionary Horea also known as Vasile Ursu Nicola.
