= SS. Michael and Gabriel Cathedral, Satu Mare =

Religious building in Satu Mare, Romania

Coordinates: 47.7923°N 22.8796°E

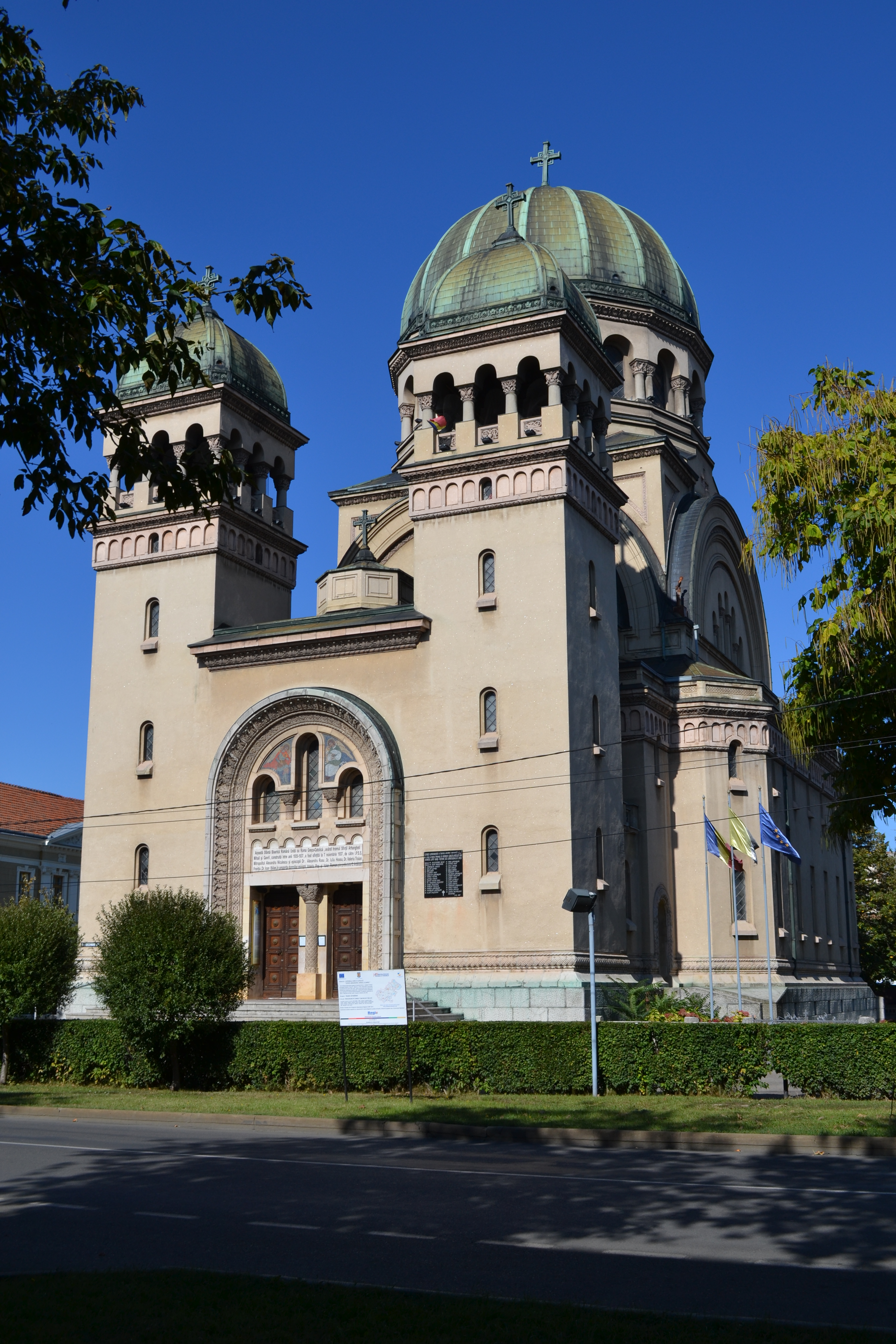
The cathedral in 2014

The SS. Michael and Gabriel Cathedral (Romanian: Catedrala Sfinţii Arhangheli Mihail şi Gavril) is a Greek-Catholic (from 1948 to 2006 Romanian Orthodox) religious building in Satu Mare, Romania, built between 1932 and 1937 in place of an older church which had been opened in 1803. The newer edifice was commissioned to architects Victor Smigelschi and Gheorghe P. Liteanu, and its style relates to the Neo-Brâncovenesc architecture of the period, featuring a pendentive dome with towers on either side of the narthex and a monumental portal at the entrance (outlined by an archvault decorated in cable moulding and acanthus).

The cathedral building is divided into three naves flanked by double columns, and its narthex features a balcony. The interior features murals by painters Schnell and the Profeta brothers, while the basement hosts a collection of old books, icons and other religious artifacts. The cathedral collection was set up in the 1980s, decades after the communist regime confiscated Greek-Catholic property and assigned it to the Orthodox Church. It hosts objects of special significance to Orthodox culture in Transylvania, including some 500 old Romanian-language books, over 40 Romanian Orthodox icons on wood or glass (including 17th-century pieces from Corund and Oar-Vetiş). Among the rare works of Romanian literature from the Early Modern period hosted by the SS. Michael and Gabriel Cathedral are a homily by Bishop Varlaam (Iaşi, 1693), the Kyriacodromion of Bălgrad (1699), and the writings of Anthim the Iberian. The cathedral has a height of 40 metres (131 ft).
