= Dana Complex =

General information
- Status: Completed
- Location: Satu Mare, Romania
- Construction started: 2008
- Opening: 2011
- Cost: US$ 30.000.000
- Owner: Zirmer Bud

Height
- Roof: 64 m (210 ft)

Technical details
- Floor count: 15
- Floor area: 42,000 m^{2} (450,000 sq ft)

Dana Complex is a building complex in Satu Mare, Romania. The structure has two separate buildings linked together by a skybridge. The smaller 7 story buildings has 500 parking spaces and offices and the larger 15 story tower of 64 metres (210 ft) to have a mall, a commercial area and 127 residential units.
