= Frumoasa (Olt) =

- Location within Romania

Location
- Country: Romania
- Counties: Harghita County
- Villages: Frumoasa

Physical characteristics
- Mouth: Racul
  - coordinates: 46.4552°N 25.7839°E
- Length: 20 km (12 mi)
- Basin size: 52 km^{2} (20 sq mi)

Basin features
- Progression: Racul→ Olt→ Danube→ Black Sea
- Tributaries
  - left: Solonca

The Frumoasa is a left tributary of the river Racul in Romania. It discharges into the Racul in Gârciu. The Frumoasa Dam is located on this river. Its length is 20 km (12 mi) and its basin size is 52 km^{2} (20 sq mi).
