= Caracău Viaduct =

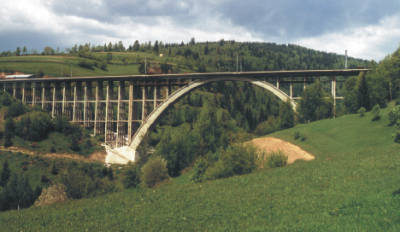
- Coordinates: 46°31′28″N 25°52′20″E
- Carries: railway track
- Locale: between Miercurea Ciuc and Ghimeș

Characteristics
- Total length: 264 m (866 ft)
- Height: 64 m (210 ft)

History
- Opened: October 18, 1897
- Rebuilt: September 14, 1946

The Caracău Viaduct (Romanian: Viaductul Caracău, Hungarian: Karakó völgyhid) is a viaduct in Romania, between the cities of Miercurea Ciuc and Ghimeș. The bridge was opened on October 18, 1897. It was one of the tallest viaducts of the Austro-Hungarian monarchy (64m), and was considered a masterpiece of Hungarian engineering.

In August 1916, during World War I, the main span of the bridge was completely destroyed by the retreating Austro-Hungarian troops, but it was rebuilt in 1917. The viaduct was demolished again in September 1944 by retreating German soldiers during World War II. The whole structure was reconstructed in 1946, with the bridge reopened on September 14, 1946.

The viaduct is 264 metres (866 feet) in length, with the main span of 101.76 m (333.9 ft) being constructed out of reinforced concrete. It stands at a height of 64 m (210 ft) above the valley it crosses.

== See also ==
- List of bridges in Romania
