= Select World Tower =

General information
- Status: Under construction
- Location: Satu Mare, Romania
- Construction started: 2007
- Opening: 2010
- Cost: US$13,000,000
- Owner: Select World

Height
- Roof: 40 m (130 ft)

Technical details
- Floor count: 8
- Floor area: 31,600 m^{2} (340,000 sq ft)

Select World Tower is a building complex located in Satu Mare, Romania. The structure is constructed in the shape of a vertical U, with two towers of 6 and 8 storeys linked together by a 2-storey smaller building. The six storey tower contains 4,300 square metres (46,285 sq ft) of office spaces and a multifunctional hall. The two storey building is an 11,000 square metres (118,403 sq ft) commercial center. The eight storey tower contains a four star hotel with 101 rooms and a surface area of 12,600 square metres (135,625 sq ft).
