= Calvaria Roman Catholic Church, Satu Mare =

Building in Satu Mare, Romania

Coordinates: 47.7903°N 22.8755°E

Satu Mare Calvaria Roman Catholic Church
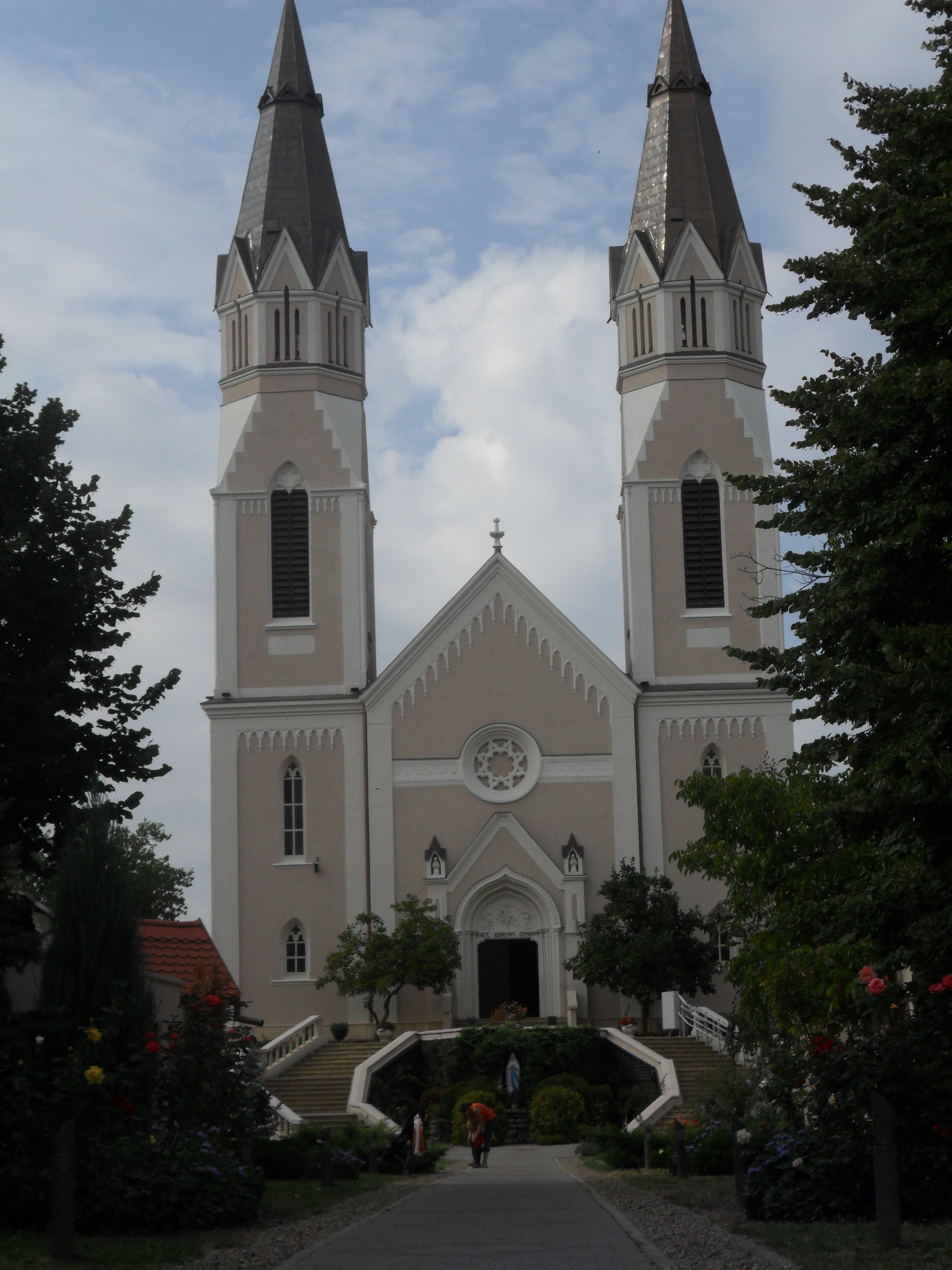
- Interactive map of the Satu Mare Calvaria Roman Catholic Church area

General information
- Location: Satu Mare, Romania
- Completed: 1884

The Calvaria Church (Romanian: Biserica Calvaria; Hungarian: Kálvária templom) is a Roman Catholic religious building in Satu Mare, Romania, and one of the oldest churches in the city. Located on Mihai Eminescu Street, it was originally built in 1844, and stands in place of the old fortress Castrum-Zothmar. Its original walls broke after the foundation caved over the sandy ground. The church was rebuilt from the ground up by the Weszelovszky brothers, in 1908–1909. The church has a height of 42 metres (138 ft).
